= 2025 in Canadian television =

This article lists notable events affecting Canadian television in 2025. Events listed include television show debuts, finales, cancellations, and channel launches, closures and rebrandings.

== Notable events ==
=== January ===
Date	Event	Source
1	Rogers Sports & Media's new agreement for Warner Bros. Discovery lifestyle and factual brands, announced in June 2024, takes effect. New versions of five WBD-licensed channel brands previously licensed to Bell Media or Corus Entertainment launched under Rogers ownership, with other affected brands available through Citytv+. Five Discovery-branded channels owned by Bell rebranded, two adopting new brands licensed from NBCUniversal, later Versant.	

=== February ===
Date	Event	Source
10	Sid Seixeiro and Meredith Shaw simultaneously depart as hosts of Citytv's Breakfast Television.	

=== March ===
Date	Event	Source
17	Dina Pugliese returns as host of Citytv's Breakfast Television after departing the program in 2023, alongside new co-host Tim Bolen.	

=== May ===
Date	Event	Source
13	Stingray Group announces the closure of its stations in Lloydminster, Alberta/Saskatchewan, CKSA-DT and CITL-DT, effective immediately, citing "challenging economic conditions."	

=== June ===
Date	Event	Source
3	Pattison Media announces the closure of Medicine Hat's CHAT-TV after 68 years due to decreasing support for local television and ongoing losses, making it impossible to continue TV operations in the city.	
4	Longtime CBC News Network morning anchor Heather Hiscox announces her retirement, effective November 6.	

=== July ===
Date	Event	Source
10	Corus Entertainment announces the closure of ABC Spark, Disney Jr., Disney XD, La Chaîne Disney, and Nickelodeon on September 1 due to financial pressure within Corus. On the day after this closure, Corus also announces that its animation studio Nelvana would suspend operations, with its current projects ending production.	

=== August ===
Date	Event	Source
25	WildBrain announces the closures of Family Channel, Family Jr., Télémagino, and WildBrainTV effective October 22, due to a decline of its carriage agreements with Bell and Rogers caused the networks to become economically unviable, and the cancellation of its proposed sale of a majority stake in the channels to IoM Media Ventures. WildBrain had originally acquired the networks from Astral Media in 2014, following their acquisition by Bell Media in 2013.	

=== September ===
Date	Event	Source
1	Following the shutdown of Nickelodeon in Canada, its programming are removed from sister channels YTV and Treehouse due to Corus' continued financial issues. Some series are moved to the Canadian version of Paramount+.	
12	The CRTC approves the acquisition of the Hollywood Suite pay television service by Anthem Sports & Entertainment.	

=== December ===
Date	Event	Source
18	WildBrain announces an agreement to eliminate its remaining debts by selling the plurality stake it holds in the American Peanuts franchise to Sony in a deal valued at US$457 million.	
22	Global Television Network accidentally uploads a version of a 60 Minutes episode containing the story pulled from the American broadcast titled "Inside CECOT" to its streaming services. It is then leaked to online websites afterwards.	

== Programs ==
=== Programs debuting in 2025 ===
Start date	Show	Channel	Source
January 6	Saint-Pierre	CBC Television	
January 7	North of North	CBC Television	
February 1	Sounds Black	History	
February 10	Novelette Is Trying	OUTtv	
February 14	Settle Down	OUTtv	
February 18	Hanomansing Tonight	CBC News Network	
February 24	Pamela's Cooking with Love	Flavour	
February 25	Small Achievable Goals	CBC Television	
April 21	Big Burger Battle	Flavour	
May 2	Drag Brunch Saved My Life	Crave	
May 15	Game Changers	AMI-tv	
May 16	Super Team Canada	Crave	
May 26	We Were Broncos	AMI-tv	
June 12	Revival	CTV Sci-Fi	
July 8	Pretty Blind	AMI-tv	
July 11	Underdog Inc.	AMI-tv	
August 21	Hey Halifax, Hello! Today!	TV1	
August 25	Coastal Carvings	APTN Lumi	
September 4	Beer Budget Reno	Home	
September 7	Building Baeumler	Home	
November 6	The Assembly	CBC Television	
November 10	Rentovation	Home	
November 28	Heated Rivalry	Crave	
N/A	Bad Trips	Crave	
N/A	Locals Welcome	CBC Television	
N/A	My Pet Ate What?	CTV Wild	
N/A	One Day We'll All Be Dead	Crave	
N/A	Queen of the Castle	CTV Life	
N/A	Shipwreck Kings	Discovery	
N/A	Sounds Black	History	
N/A	Yukon Rescue	History	

=== Programs ending in 2025 ===
End date	Show	Channel	First aired	Status	Source
February 27	Children Ruin Everything	CTV	2022	Ended	
June 27	The Agenda	TVO	2006	Ended	

=== Specials ===
Date	Show	Channel	Source
March 30	Juno Awards of 2025	CBC	
June 1	13th Canadian Screen Awards	CBC	
June 27	King Arthur's Night	AMI-tv	
October 8	Michelle Ross: Unknown Icon	Documentary	
September 13	2025 Canadian Country Music Association Awards	CTV	
November 16	112th Grey Cup	CTV, TSN	
December 7	27th Quebec Cinema Awards	Noovo	

== Networks and services ==
=== Network launches ===
Network	Type	Launch date	Notes
Discovery	Cable and satellite	January 1	New channels operated by Rogers Sports & Media, under brands previously used by different channels.
Food Network	Cable and satellite	January 1	New channels operated by Rogers Sports & Media, under brands previously used by different channels.
HGTV	Cable and satellite	January 1	New channels operated by Rogers Sports & Media, under brands previously used by different channels.
Investigation Discovery	Cable and satellite	January 1	New channels operated by Rogers Sports & Media, under brands previously used by different channels.
Magnolia Network	Cable and satellite	January 1	New channels operated by Rogers Sports & Media, under brands previously used by different channels.

=== Network rebrandings ===
Old network name	New network name	Type	Conversion date	Notes
Animal Planet	CTV Wild Channel	Cable/satellite	January 1	Bell Media channels relaunched due to previous programming and brand rights being acquired by Rogers.
Discovery Channel (original)	USA Network	Cable/satellite	January 1	Bell Media channels relaunched due to previous programming and brand rights being acquired by Rogers.
Discovery Science	CTV Nature Channel	Cable/satellite	January 1	Bell Media channels relaunched due to previous programming and brand rights being acquired by Rogers.
Discovery Velocity	CTV Speed Channel	Cable/satellite	January 1	Bell Media channels relaunched due to previous programming and brand rights being acquired by Rogers.
Investigation Discovery (original)	Oxygen True Crime	Cable/satellite	January 1	Bell Media channels relaunched due to previous programming and brand rights being acquired by Rogers.

=== Station closures ===
Market	Station	Affiliation	Closure date	Notes
Lloydminster, Alberta/Saskatchewan	CKSA-DT	Citytv	May 13	
Lloydminster, Alberta/Saskatchewan	CITL-DT	CTV	May 13	
Medicine Hat, Alberta	CHAT-TV	Citytv	June 3	

=== Network closures ===
Network	Type	Closure date	Notes
ABC Spark	Cable/satellite	September 1	
Disney Jr.	Cable/satellite	September 1	
Disney XD	Cable/satellite	September 1	
La Chaîne Disney	Cable/satellite	September 1	
Nickelodeon	Cable/satellite	September 1	
Family Channel	Cable/satellite	October 23	
Family Jr.	Cable/satellite	October 23	
Télémagino	Cable/satellite	October 23	
WildBrainTV	Cable/satellite	October 23	

== Deaths ==
Date	Name	Age	Notes	Sources
January 6	Dale Wilson	82	Voice actor for Ocean Productions and Nelvana	
April 10	Ted Kotcheff	94	Canadian-born Bulgarian director (On Camera, Family of Cops)	
June 3	Juliette Powell	54	Beauty pageant winner (Miss Canada 1989) and television news reporter and host (MusiquePlus, MuchMusic, CP24)	
September 1	Graham Greene	73	First Nations actor (9B, The Adventures of Dudley the Dragon, The Red Green Show)	
September 14	Beverly Thomson	61	Reporter/anchor (CFTO and CIII/Toronto, CTV News Channel) and host of CTV's Canada AM	
September 17	Riff Markowitz	86	Producer and host (The Hilarious House of Frightenstein, Party Game, The Wolfman Jack Show)	
November 1	Anna Sandor	76	Hungarian-born Canadian/American writer (series including King of Kensington, Hangin' In, and Seeing Things; television movies including Charlie Grant's War and The Marriage Bed)	
November 25	Colleen Jones	65	Champion curler and reporter/host for CBC News and CBC Sports	
December 25	Stu Phillips	92	Country singer (Music Place)	

== See also ==
- List of Canadian films of 2025
