= 2024 Canadian specialty television realignment =

In June 2024, Rogers Communications announced a licensing agreement with Warner Bros. Discovery (WBD), under which it holds the rights to the channel brands and programming of WBD's factual and lifestyle television networks (such as Discovery Channel, Investigation Discovery, Food Network, and HGTV among others). The agreement triggered a major re-alignment of Canadian specialty television, ending the long-term associations between the brands of WBD predecessors Discovery, Inc. and Scripps Networks Interactive with Bell Media and Corus Entertainment respectively.

Most of the changes associated with these agreements took place on and around January 1, 2025, including the rebranding of multiple specialty channels across both companies under new proprietary brands with revised programming lineups; Corus relaunched its Food Network and HGTV channels on December 30, 2024, as Flavour Network and Home Network respectively, and Bell rebranded most of its Discovery-branded channels under the CTV brand on January 1, 2025. An exception were Bell's Discovery Channel and Investigation Discovery channels, which relaunched as USA Network and Oxygen respectively under a licensing agreement with NBCUniversal. Corus would close multiple specialty channels due to the changes, including Cooking Channel, its iteration of Magnolia Network, and Oprah Winfrey Network.

Alongside the WBD deal, Rogers concurrently announced an agreement with NBCUniversal for the Canadian rights to Bravo, mostly replacing an existing relationship with the Corus-owned specialty channel Slice. The new channel launched in September 2024 as a replacement for OLN. Other closures unrelated to the WBD agreements also occurred at the end of 2024, including Bell shutting down its MTV channel, Rogers ending Canadian distribution of WWE Network due to its loss of rights to WWE content to Netflix, and Paramount Global withdrawing BET and CBS Sports Network from Canadian distribution.

The loss of its rights to WBD lifestyle content exacerbated financial issues being faced by Corus since the Shaw family's sale of former sister company Shaw Communications (for which it had financial synergies) to Rogers itself in 2023, resulting in various notable cuts across its properties in mid-2024. Corus also accused Rogers of abusing its market position in cable television since the merger in ways that it considered detrimental to its specialty channels, and of intending to displace Flavour and Home Network to different channel positions in favour of Rogers' Food Network and HGTV channels, under the false pretense the rebranded services were "new" channels.

== Background ==
=== Past licensing relationships ===
Discovery Channel in Canada was first established in 1994 by NetStar Communications, a company formed from the broadcasting assets of Labatt Brewing Company after its sale to Interbrew (due to restrictions on the foreign ownership of broadcasters). Due to its ownership of TSN, ESPN Inc. also held a stake in the company. A majority stake in NetStar was acquired in 2000 by CTV Inc., which was then acquired by Bell Canada Enterprises along with The Globe and Mail to form Bell Globemedia—the direct precursor to the current Bell Media. The subsidiary, now CTV Specialty Television, would launch other Discovery channel brands in Canada, including a Canadian version of Animal Planet in 2000, and then Discovery World, Investigation Discovery, and Discovery Science (Science Channel) in 2010 as part of an expanded licensing agreement with Discovery Communications.

Corus Entertainment's association with the former Scripps Networks brands dates back to a corporate precursor, Atlantis Communications, who launched a Canadian version of HGTV in partnership with Scripps in 1997. Atlantis would later merge with Alliance Communications, forming Alliance Atlantis. The company would go on to form Food Network Canada in 2000, replacing the original U.S. network on television providers. In 2007, Alliance Atlantis' television assets were sold to a consortium of Canwest and Goldman Sachs Alternatives known as CW Media. After Canwest filed for bankruptcy, the company's assets were acquired by Shaw Communications via the Shaw Media subsidiary. Shaw Media was subsumed by Corus in 2016; both companies had already been principally controlled by JR Shaw and his family, with Corus originally established as a spin-off from Shaw in 1999. Corus would launch other Scripps brands such as DIY Network (which would later be replaced, as in the U.S., by Magnolia Network) and Cooking Channel, and served as a Canadian launch partner for Discovery's streaming platform Discovery+.

Some of HGTV's Canadian content programs have been aired by HGTV U.S., with Love It or List It and Property Brothers in particular being among its top shows. In March 2024, according to ratings from Numeris, Corus stated that its channels accounted for 17 out of the top 20 non-sports programs on Canadian specialty television in January and February, including HGTV and Food Network programs such as Celebrity IOU, House Hunters, and Beat Bobby Flay.

=== Shaw acquisition by Rogers ===
On March 15, 2021, Rogers Communications announced a $26 billion offer to acquire Shaw, subject to regulatory and shareholder approval. The sale was completed on April 13, 2023. The CRTC began to classify Corus as an independent broadcaster as a result. In the months following the sale, Corus began to experience financial issues and declining revenue; on July 13, 2023, Corus announced that it would sell its Toon Boom animation software to the private equity firm TPG Inc. for $147.5 million to help pay down its debt. On October 27, 2023, Corus announced the suspension of its dividend and intention to redirect the use of free cash flow from dividends to debt repayment.

On May 13, 2024, the CRTC approved an "exceptional" request from Corus to reduce its mandatory expenditures into programs of national interest (PNI) from 8.5% to 5% of revenue, in order to help offset its loss of Shaw community television expenditures for local news in metropolitan markets (which was reallocated from Corus's Global stations to Rogers' Citytv stations as a result of the acquisition).

== Rogers agreements with Warner Bros. Discovery and NBCUniversal ==
On June 6, 2024, Corus disclosed that Warner Bros. Discovery (WBD) had declined to renew some of its brand licensing and programming agreements with the company, which were set to expire at the end of the year. Without revealing specific details, Corus CEO Doug Murphy alluded to the presence of "inequitable structural relationships in the Canadian media and telecom industries, particularly affecting independent broadcasters like Corus".

On June 10, 2024, Rogers Sports & Media announced an exclusive licensing agreement with WBD, under which the rights to all WBD lifestyle and factual brands would move to Rogers platforms beginning in 2025, including Animal Planet, Discovery Channel, Food Network, HGTV, Investigation Discovery (ID), Magnolia Network, Motor Trend, the Oprah Winfrey Network (OWN), and Science Channel. Content would be distributed via new and existing Rogers platforms, including its television networks and Citytv+; on January 1, 2025, Rogers relaunched Discovery, Food Network, HGTV, ID, and Magnolia Network as new linear discretionary services. Content from Animal Planet, Cooking Channel, Motor Trend, OWN, and Science Channel will stream on Citytv+.

All five channels have initially operated as exempted discretionary services, allowing them to launch without formal approval from the CRTC provided that Rogers submits license applications after they exceed 200,000 subscribers. Rogers formally filed applications for discretionary service licenses in June 2025.

Alongside the WBD deal, Rogers also announced an agreement with NBCUniversal to acquire the Canadian rights to Bravo and its original programming, which had historically been carried by Corus channel Slice. The new channel launched on September 1, 2024, using the former channel allotments and license of OLN.

== Programming changes ==
Due to the end of the licensing agreements, both Bell Media and Corus Entertainment announced plans to rebrand and/or relaunch their WBD-licensed channels under new brands, while preserving existing programming scopes and Canadian productions:

=== Corus ===
Corus stated that most of its WBD-licensed networks would continue to operate under new brands and an "alternate foreign program supply". Corus did not rule out the possibility of networks being shut down outright instead. The Canadian version of Oprah Winfrey Network shut down on September 1, 2024. Programming changes at Corus networks began in the 2024–25 television season, with Slice widening its format to include true crime programming, and acquiring new reality and comedy programs (including additional We TV programs and Comedy Central's The Daily Show; the latter having formerly aired on CTV Comedy Channel until 2023, following Trevor Noah's 2022 departure and the aftermath of the 2023 WGA strike).

On September 18, 2024, Corus announced the rebranding of HGTV and Food Network as Home Network and Flavour Network, respectively, on December 30, 2024; the two networks would be built around new and existing Corus original productions, as well as new U.S. and international acquisitions (including content from Fifth Season/The Roku Channel, and Studio Ramsay Global). Corus co-CEO Troy Reeb stated that the rebranding was an opportunity to widen the networks' programming to be "younger", "fresher", and no longer bound by the limitations of the existing licensed brands. In December 2024, Corus announced a further acquisition of entertainment and lifestyle content from ITV Studios for Flavour, Home, and Slice.

Beginning in November, multiple television providers stated that the Corus-owned iterations of Cooking Channel and Magnolia Network would be closed on December 31. This was confirmed directly by Corus, via the channels' websites, in early December.

=== Bell ===
Bell Media announced its plans for its WBD-licensed networks on October 17, 2024: the company announced new licensing agreements with NBCUniversal to introduce the Oxygen and USA Network brands to Canada, which replaced ID and Discovery respectively on January 1, 2025. Oxygen saw no major changes in programming scope over ID as it is also focused on true crime, but Discovery's rebranding as USA Network formally broadened the channel's scope to include more entertainment programming outside of science and technology. The remaining channels were brought under CTV branding similar to Bell Media's other thematic specialty channels, with Animal Planet, Discovery Science, and Discovery Velocity relaunched as CTV Wild, Nature, and Speed Channel respectively. All five channels retained their existing Canadian programming.

In an unrelated move, Bell Media announced that MTV would also close on December 31, 2024, citing "changing audiences".

=== Other companies ===
The realignment coincided with other changes not directly related to the Rogers/WBD deal:

- WWE Network (which was distributed in Canada by Rogers as part of Sportsnet's rights to WWE professional wrestling programming) ceased operations in Canada at the end of 2024 due to a new licensing agreement with Netflix, which gives it rights to all WWE weekly programming, live events, and archive content outside of the United States, and exclusive rights to WWE Raw in the United States and internationally. To supplant WWE programming on Sportsnet 360, Rogers would announce a deal with the competing promotion TNA (owned by Canadian broadcaster Anthem Sports & Entertainment) to air its weekly series TNA Impact! and other library programming beginning in January 2025.
- Several television providers indicated that Paramount Global would be withdrawing BET and CBS Sports Network from Canadian distribution on December 31, 2024.

== Channel distribution changes ==
Corus' Reeb indicated his company would be "asserting the rights of these channels to continue to be on the air, on cable, on satellite, in the position they've always been," such as Home Network retaining the channel numbers currently held by Corus' HGTV Canada.

However, in early December 2024, Rogers' cable service division acknowledged to the CRTC that it intended to relocate Home and Flavour to new three-digit channel numbers when they rebrand on December 30, arguing that their customers expect to find HGTV and Food Network programming at the channels currently occupied by those brands, and that Home and Flavour are "new services". Rogers had previously made moves towards removing Slice, Home, and Flavour entirely, but such a move is currently barred under the CRTC's standstill policy, as discussed below.

In November and December 2024, some third-party providers began to release details about how they would handle the realignments:

- Cogeco, which operates in parts of Ontario and Quebec, as well as SaskTel and Access Communications in Saskatchewan and Tbaytel in Thunder Bay, all indicated they would maintain the continuing Corus and Bell channels under their new brands. To date, none of these companies have announced plans to carry the new Rogers channels.
- Rural Ontario cable provider Hay Communications initially indicated plans to maintain the existing channel brands at their current positions, such as Rogers' Discovery Channel taking the Hay channel number of Bell's version. It later clarified that while it intends to launch the new Rogers channels, it may not be able to reach an agreement in time for their launch, and that it too would maintain the rebranded Bell and Corus channels in their existing positions.
- On December 1, Telus announced that its Optik TV service would continue to carry the rebranded Flavour Network and Home Network, but initially said it would drop Bell's rebranding channels on January 1. Telus also did not announce plans to carry the replacement Rogers channels. On December 31, Telus updated its notice, saying it would carry the rebranded Bell-operated channels. In March 2025, Telus reached an agreement to carry the new Rogers channels and Bravo.

Traditional TV subscribers whose providers are not carrying all the affected channels, as well as viewers without a traditional TV provider, will have other ways to access the channels' content, at additional cost:

- Corus has said that Home Network, Flavour Network, and their associated content will continue to be available through its direct-to-consumer streaming package StackTV via Amazon Prime Video.
- Rogers has indicated that all WBD lifestyle brands and Bravo will be available to stream on its direct-to-consumer streaming package Citytv+ via Amazon Prime Video.
- Bell does not offer a similar direct-to-consumer service with the affected linear channels it owns, but has said much of the content from USA, Oxygen, and the other rebranded channels will be available through its direct-to-consumer streaming service Crave.

== Regulatory complaints and litigation ==
=== Bell Media complaints with Rogers and WBD ===
On June 19, 2024, Bell Media filed a request for an injunction against both Rogers and WBD, seeking to delay the implementation of the agreement. Bell asserted that its original contract with Discovery gave it rights to a two-year "window to adjust" in the event it were not renewed, preventing the company from supplying programming to a competitor for two years. A Rogers spokesperson stated that the filing was "without merit", and accused Bell of seeking to "block Canadians from seeing these Discovery channels for two years – stopping anyone in Canada from distributing them and stopping anyone in Canada from watching them."

On August 28, 2024, Bell filed that it was no longer seeking injunctive relief against Rogers, and would focus upon WBD's alleged violations of non-compete clauses and its right of first negotiation. Bell stated that it had been "[misled] into believing that its exclusive right of first negotiation had been respected", and that it had attempted to begin negotiations to renew with WBD in late-2023, but that the company had made "repeated conflicting representations about their intentions on several issues".

On October 8, 2024, Bell announced that it had reached a settlement with WBD. Under the agreement, Bell renewed its Canadian rights to HBO and Max original programming for Crave, and also entered into pacts to develop new international co-productions, and distribute Bell Media original productions via WBD platforms internationally.

In July 2025, Bell and Rogers announced a renewed carriage agreement for each other's specialty channels, ensuring the availability of Rogers' new channels on Bell-owned television platforms.

=== Corus complaints against Rogers ===
In retaliation for the agreement, Corus filed a complaint against Rogers with the Canadian Radio-television and Telecommunications Commission (CRTC) in August 2024, accusing the company of abusing a dominant position in the Canadian telecom market since its acquisition of Shaw. In particular, Corus accused Rogers of showing an undue preference towards the foreign streaming service Disney+—for which Rogers provides Canadian advertising sales—that was harmful to its own Disney Branded Television-licensed networks (such as Disney Channel). These included prominent placements for the Disney+ app near the channels in the Ignite TV electronic program guide, and promotional offers bundling the ad-supported tier of Disney+ with Ignite TV service for no additional charge. Corus stated that these tactics were "clearly part of a larger, predatory strategy to 'cut out the middle company,' which affects all Canadian independent programming services", and believed that the CRTC had been lax in enforcing conditions of the sale relating to Rogers' dealings with independent broadcasters. Rogers challenged the complaint as "baseless", arguing that Corus had failed to adapt its "broken business model" to cord-cutting (especially in the children's television market), and was "trying to force service providers to carry and our customers to pay for channels they no longer want to watch".

The Gazette media writer Steve Faguy noted that the original launches of Corus' Disney-branded networks in 2015 had occurred under nearly identical circumstances to Rogers' WBD deal, as Corus had acquired the Disney Channel library rights formerly held by DHX Media (now WildBrain)'s Family Channel, Disney Junior, and Disney XD—resulting in Corus establishing its own Disney Channel, Disney Junior, and Disney XD channels under new licenses, and DHX's Disney Junior and XD channels being rebranded as spin-offs from Family.

Following receipt of notice from Rogers' cable division in late October that it intends to relocate Flavour and Home Network on December 30, replacing their current positions with Rogers' new Food Network and HGTV channels, Corus filed a separate complaint in November about the relocations. Corus also found fault with an advisory sent by Rogers to third-party providers asking them not to refer to Corus' relaunches as "rebrands" in order to "avoid any potential legal claims". The CRTC directed Rogers not to move the Corus channels, with Rogers announcing an appeal of that finding in December 2024.

=== Corus litigation with Rogers ===
In November 2024, filings in the Ontario Superior Court revealed that Rogers has also been in a carriage dispute with Corus, and has sought to drop a number of Corus channels (including Food Network, HGTV, Slice, and YTV among others) that they deemed to be underperforming and no longer viable under present market conditions. The CRTC has considered negotiations for Corus networks on its cable systems in Eastern Canada (Rogers' systems in Western Canada are covered by a different agreement inherited from Shaw) to be at a standstill. Under the CRTC Wholesale Code, specialty channels cannot be pulled from television providers if negotiations are at a standstill, with the provider allowed to continue carrying the channel under existing terms.

In August 2024, Corus sought an injunction against Rogers for planning to drop Slice from new packages on its Eastern Canada systems in September 2024; Rogers considered the channel deprecated and redundant to its new Bravo channel, as Bravo programming was determined by Rogers to have been the network's main draw. Corus believed that the decision violated Rogers' carriage agreement, and the CRTC standstill. In November 2024, the Ontario Superior Court ruled that Rogers did not violate the carriage agreement, as the contractual provision allowing Rogers to freely "create" packages and bundles including Corus networks did not necessarily prohibit it from modifying the packages afterward (the Western Canada contracts originally made with Shaw do contain a provision requiring a 120-day notice before a package is modified, and also requires a package to be discontinued if a Corus channel is removed from it). The Court did not rule on the CRTC matter, as it is not within its jurisdiction.

== Aftermath ==
The announcement caused Corus's share price to fall significantly. On June 17, 2024, Corus CEO Doug Murphy retired after 21 years with the company, with CFO John Gossling and executive vice president of networks and content Troy Reeb succeeding him as co-chairmen. On July 15, citing the "challenging advertising environment", Gossling stated during Corus's third-quarter earnings report that the company planned to cut 300 more positions by the end of August (a total of 800 since September 2022) and "aggressively" cut costs.

Corus continued to cut staff in its television and radio businesses over the following months, including layoffs in the Global News division (including the end of local news production at CHBC-DT in Kelowna, replaced with newscasts produced at Vancouver sister station CHAN-DT with contributions from local reporters), layoffs at its Kingston, Ontario radio and television stations, and the closure of AM stations CHQT Edmonton, CKGO Vancouver, and CHML Hamilton. The on-air announcement of CHML's closure cited "years of financial loss" and "the shift of advertising revenues to unregulated foreign platforms". On July 17, Corus-owned Nelvana suspended its development of new projects through the end of 2024, after the departure of its vice president Athena Georgaklis.

In September 2024, The Globe and Mail reported that rival conglomerate Quebecor (which had acquired Freedom Mobile from Shaw as a condition of the Rogers–Shaw purchase) had made offers to acquire Corus, and was seeking to have the company's debt written down by 60% to ease a potential acquisition. Company representatives had met with Corus executive Heather Shaw earlier in 2024.

In late January 2025, TV critic Bill Brioux, citing Numeris data sent to him by Corus, reported that Home and Flavour retained significantly larger audiences in the 25–54 demographic during the first two weeks of January compared to the new Rogers versions of HGTV and Food Network.

On September 1, 2025, Corus closed its specialty networks La Chaîne Disney, Disney XD, Disney Jr., ABC Spark and Nickelodeon, following a "comprehensive review" of its operations to "[meet] the evolving needs of our audiences and distribution partners"..

== See also ==
- 2007 Canadian broadcast television realignment
- 2024 in Canadian television
- 2025 in Canadian television
