= Fear Thy Neighbor =

- Genre: True crime; Documentary
- Developed by: James Farr
- Directed by: David Tebby
- Starring: Rich Trelford
- Composer: Simon Poole
- Countries of origin: United States; Canada
- Original language: English
- No. of seasons: 9
- No. of episodes: 91

Production
- Executive producers: Kate Harrison Karman; David W.Brady; Matthew Bodi; Jeffrey Hirschfield
- Producers: Armen Kazazian; Patrick Cameron
- Editors: Enzo Anile; Sharon Zupancic; John Watson; Barry Mcmann
- Running time: 42 minutes
- Production companies: Cream Productions; Investigation Discovery; Bell Media; Fremantle

Original release
- Network: Investigation Discovery (United States); Oxygen (English Canada); Investigation (French Canada)
- Release: April 14, 2014 – November 20, 2024

Fear Thy Neighbor is a true crime documentary television series which premiered on April 14, 2014 on the Investigation Discovery channel. The narrator for the series is voice actress Tish Iceton.

== Synopsis ==
The show focuses on various feuds between neighbors in the US and Canada, typically starting over often minor issues (dog bites, noise complaints, property disputes) which escalate into violence and (in most episodes) the death of one of the neighbors involved.

== Production ==
The series is an international co-production between the Canadian factual production company Cream Productions, the American cable television network Investigation Discovery, its Canadian version (later relaunched as Oxygen) and the French-language Canadian documentary television channel Canal D (later replaced by its crime-focused spinoff Canal D/Investigation, later known as Investigation, starting with season 3), with Bell Media, as the owner of Canal D, Investigation and Investigation Discovery Canada, producing the series for Investigation Discovery Canada and Investigation (previously for Canal D) as the parent company of both these channels via their original programming production unit.

On December 31, 2020, Investigation Discovery premiered a spinoff series, Fear Thy Roommate, in which people are threatened or killed by their roommates in college dorms, apartments, etc. Season 7 of the main series began on May 7, 2021, with the episode "I’m Not Moving". Season 8 begins on June 13, 2022, with the episode "Blizzard Of Blood." On October 10. 2022, the series aired its first two-hour episode, "Inferno Of Hate", which was the season 8 finale. Season 9 began on October 16, 2023 with the episodes "The Secret Wife" and "Bullets In The Snow."

Season 10 began on June 26. 2024, with the episode "Hillbilly Holler."

Season 11 begins on October 23, 2024 with the episode "The Mayor."

== Episodes ==
Season	Episodes	Originally released		
Season	Episodes	First released	Last released	Network
1	6	April 14, 2014	May 19, 2014	Investigation Discovery
2	13	April 13, 2015	July 13, 2015	Investigation Discovery
3	10	March 30, 2016	June 7, 2016	Investigation Discovery
4	10	April 6, 2017	June 8, 2017	Investigation Discovery
5	10	June 2, 2018	August 4, 2018	Investigation Discovery
6	10	August 1, 2019	November 2, 2019	Investigation Discovery
7	13	May 7, 2021	July 30, 2021	Investigation Discovery and Discovery+
8	13	June 13, 2022	October 10, 2022	Investigation Discovery and Discovery+
9	6	October 16, 2023	November 13, 2023	Investigation Discovery and Discovery+

=== Season 1 (2014) ===
No. overall	No. in season	Title	Original release date
1	1	"Lies Lawns Murder"	April 14, 2014
In Lenoir, North Carolina, a friendly relationship between a retired Vietnam veteran and a young couple with two children living next door gradually degenerates when the older man's dog bites the children. After arguments over doctor and hospital bills, a feud begins, leading to the killing of the dog. But the dog is not the only one to be killed...
2	2	"Red Picket Fences"	April 21, 2014
In a quiet town in Maine, two very different families with young children attempt to be friendly. But as time goes on, conflicts ensue and escalate and the two families become enemies. As a result, one set of parents are killed.
3	3	"Final Notice"	April 28, 2014
Los Angeles Police Officer Irsie Henry, his wife Sharon, and son move into a nice neighborhood in Altadena, California. The officer winds up causing havoc over his prejudice against interracial marriages and ultimately loses his job. Bitter and angry, he makes their lives hell, not only for his next door neighbors, John and Melaine Hamilton, but also for most families on the block.
4	4	"There's No Place Like Hell"	May 5, 2014
Neighboring Omaha, Nebraska families attempt to be friendly, but everyday stresses cause tension between the two families. The relationship between the two families deteriorates until they become each other's worst enemies and the mutual hostility between them ultimately leads to an arson attack.
5	5	"Home Is Where The Hearse Is"	May 12, 2014
Two families in a Cuban neighborhood in the western outskirts of Miami become enemies. One family consists of an older man and his family which is trying to live in peace and quiet, while their younger neighbors tend to be loud. The neighbors clash numerous times, but the clashes do not end until one neighbor is killed by the other.
6	6	"Welcome to Murder Street"	May 19, 2014
An elite northern California Lakeside Community is rocked to its core when two well-to-do gentlemen go to war over an 18-inch property line discrepancy. One neighbor takes the dispute to a new level when he hires a hitman to permanently solve the problem.

=== Season 2 (2015) ===
No. overall	No. in season	Title	Original release date
7	1	"Kill Thy Neighbor"	April 13, 2015
In Lauderdale Lakes, Florida, a single man moves into his dream home which is beside the home of a single woman who is looking to start a romantic relationship with him. When he rejects her, bitter animosity ensues, followed by mutual sabotage and, eventually gunfire.
8	2	"Lake Of Madness"	April 20, 2015
A family moves into a Minnesota lake house, but their older neighbor next door disputes their rights to lake access and the neighbours argue over property lines. Numerous heated debates between the neighbors eventually lead to murder.
9	3	"Driveway Of Death"	April 27, 2015
In Carmel Canyon, California, wealthy neighbors get into disputes over a variety of issues from shared roads and bridges to the upkeep of their respective properties. Anger boils over and the ongoing feud is resolved with fatal gunfire.
10	4	"Good Fences Make Dead Neighbors"	May 4, 2015
Instead of the new start he was hoping for, a man's move to Canyon Country, Santa Clarita, California, finds him caught in a strange and increasingly acrimonious eight-year feud with his neighbor, until it finally ends with blasts from a shotgun.
11	5	"There Bleeds the Neighborhood"	May 11, 2015
Two families in Elyria, Ohio live beside each other in friendship and peace for decades. But eventually, their friendship turns into acrimony, mutual accusations and ultimately leads to a shocking and bloody shoot out.
12	6	"Death by Neighbor"	May 18, 2015
A family living in Florida becomes deathly ill after ingesting a rare poison and police believe that the family's next door neighbors could be to blame.
13	7	"Home Bloody Home"	May 25, 2015
The town of Toulon, Illinois, is a tight knit community - except for the local bully who everyone avoids. But when his new neighbors stand up to him after his dog bites their son, he harbors a decade long grudge that ultimately explodes in a violent frenzy.
14	8	"Kill-De-Sac"	June 1, 2015
When a freewheeling family moves from California to the conservative enclave of Leesburg, Virginia, they get on the wrong side of one of their neighbors, and the conflict escalates until bullets fly and blood flows in the street.
15	9	"My House, My Revenge"	June 15, 2015
A couple moves to a tranquil California beach town and befriends their new neighbors - that is until one of the wives descends into drugs and madness, terrorizing the other.
16	10	"Next Door to Crazy"	June 22, 2015
A teacher and her son start fresh in Las Vegas, but they immediately become the targets of harassment and escalating intimidation by the woman next door. Her anger knows no limits, and they fear how far she will go.
17	11	"Homeowner Hell"	June 29, 2015
A couple settles in Josephine County, Oregon, where they discover that their new neighbor has a deadly past. As tensions rise and tempers flare, blood will be spilled...
18	12	"Landlord, Death Lord"	July 6, 2015
A young couple moves into a Vancouver, Washington housing development with strict codes of community conduct. But someone forgot to tell their neighbor what the rules are, and he will go to extreme lengths in order to resist them.
19	13	"Fatal Family Feud"	July 13, 2015
Two families settle next to each other in peaceful Euclid, Ohio and anticipate a friendly relationship. But when one family's daughter rejects the crush of the other family's son, tensions build up and ultimately lead to murder.

=== Season 3 (2016) ===
No. overall	No. in season	Title	Original release date
20	1	"Nail in the Coffin"	March 30, 2016
A feud between neighbors in Tamarac, Florida, erupts into violence on Halloween.
21	2	"Hell Hounds"	April 6, 2016
A young family moves in next door to an animal lover in Dayton, Ohio. Tensions immediately build, leading to a violent confrontation.
22	3	"Neighborhood Madhouse"	April 13, 2016
A young family moves to Longboat Key, Florida for peace and quiet, but when their psychologist neighbor discovers that the father might actually be a violent criminal, she vows to protect herself - with tragic consequences.
23	4	"Tunnel of Hate"	April 20, 2016
Two new homeowners work to restore their neighboring, derelict homes in Pittsburgh, but one of the renovations falls seriously behind and ultimately leads to murder.
24	5	"House of the Rising Gun"	April 27, 2016
A single mom and her four children find an ideal home in New Orleans. But when a robbery at a neighbor's house results in paranoia, blood is shed.
25	6	"Burn Neighbor, Burn"	May 4, 2016
Siblings in neighboring houses in Alden, New York feud after their prodigal brother returns home.
26	7	"Daddy's Got a Gun"	May 11, 2016
After his daughter accuses a neighbor of molesting her, Barnegat Township, New Jersey police officer Edward Lutes descends into paranoia and bizarre behavior, which erupts on one tragic Spring day.
27	8	"Nightmare Next Door"	May 18, 2016
In New Brighton, Minnesota, a dispute begins when a man catches Lyme disease he claims are from the deer which are being fed by his neighbor. The feud escalates as their families join in, and it only ends after shots are fired.
28	9	"Bonfire of Blood"	May 25, 2016
A dispute over access to a road causes tension between two Lompico, California neighbors. The men's feud leads to property damage, a backhoe attack, and ultimately, murder.
29	10	"Night of the Machete"	June 7, 2016
Two young couples in an Idaho apartment building cope with a difficult neighbor who dislikes one couple's music and the other couple's dog. Tensions eventually lead to a violent rampage.

=== Season 4 (2017) ===
No. overall	No. in season	Title	Original release date
30	1	"Lust to Dust"	April 7, 2017
After the death of her husband, a middle-aged Waterloo, South Carolina woman becomes an obsession for her overly flirtatious neighbor. When her brother moves in to offer protection, it isn't long before a deadly confrontation ensues.
31	2	"Desperate Times, Deadly Measures"	April 13, 2017
An Appalachian couple is happy when their old neighbors return home after disappearing for a decade. But people can change a lot in ten years - and not necessarily for the better.
32	3	"Hysteria Lane"	April 20, 2017
Grieving the loss of their son, a Brandywine, Maryland couple is thrilled when a family with two boys moves in across the street. But when the relationship sours, tensions build up and bullets fly.
33	4	"Feud on the Frontier"	April 27, 2017
When one neighbor's dog scares the daughter and grandson of the other in Wasilla, Alaska, an all-out war begins - one which someone will not survive.
34	5	"Pack Mentality"	May 4, 2017
A single mother gets along with her handyman neighbor, until her new boyfriend adopts more than 50 dogs. As accusations turn to threats, increasing anger ultimately leads to a bloody conclusion.
35	6	"Neighbors on a Dead End"	May 11, 2017
A disabled fireman polices his neighbors in Huffman, Texas, punishing them for violations ranging from loud music to off-leash dogs. Tensions boil over at a birthday party, where shots are fired and blood is spilled.
36	7	"Bang Goes the Neighborhood"	May 18, 2017
After moving to the countryside town of Luttrell, Tennessee, a couple clashes with the gun shop owners across the street; mutual video cameras record threats, fights and growing hostilities leading to shots fired and blood spilled.
37	8	"Monkey in the Middle"	May 25, 2017
A man finds himself living between hostile neighbors on both sides, including a former U.S. marine with posttraumatic stress disorder; the neighbors' campaign of intimidation ramps up to the point of no return and ends with a deadly confrontation.
38	9	"Mountain of Madness"	June 1, 2017
A wealthy executive causes conflict after forbidding his neighbors access to his extensive lands; one local handyman fights to keep the roads and trails open for all, a struggle that ends when one man lies dead.
39	10	"Boiling Point"	June 8, 2017
Two women in neighboring apartments in Harrisburg become fast friends before becoming sworn enemies; the women enlists their sisters as reinforcements in a war that escalates and ends in horrifically shocking violence.

=== Season 5 (2018) ===
No. overall	No. in season	Title	Original release date
40	1	"Desperate Houseknives"	June 2, 2018
Two families with several children between them in Pegram, Tennessee get along famously until one of the mothers starts to dictate to the other how she should be raising her rambunctious kids. Battle lines are drawn, violence flares, and blood runs in the street.
41	2	"Deadly Duplex"	June 9, 2018
After an early retirement, a man buys a duplex in Marion, Montana and rents half of it out to a troubled family. With the help of his gun, he sends the abusive husband packing, and becomes smitten with the wife left behind - all of which turns deadly.
42	3	"Head in the Oven"	June 16, 2018
Two neighboring North Canton, Ohio bachelors start out friendly; harmless banter turns into threats which eventually ignite an escalating war; the violence ends with a murder which is so shocking and almost beyond belief.
43	4	"Cock-a-Doodle-Dead"	June 23, 2018
Cleveland Homeowner Irving Galarza hopes the renters who move into the house beside him will be better behaved than the previous tenants were. When he determines that they're not, the stage is set for a bloody conflict and a shocking act of violence that threatens to claim many lives.
44	5	"Roadkill"	June 30, 2018
A single Phelan, California woman and her daughter are pleased when a single man and his two daughters move in next door; they become fast friends until molestation charges result in anger, accusations and multiple bloody deaths.
45	6	"Mistress Of Death"	July 7, 2018
Two women have lived next door to each other in Burnet, Texas since childhood; then, one woman's ex-husband begins seeing the other woman, leading to a conflict; when property disputes are mixed in, the result is a shocking act of violence that engulfs them all.
46	7	"This Bullet's For You"	July 14, 2018
Realizing a long-held dream, a Michigan couple relocates to Clearwater, Florida, then their lives in the sun are destroyed after they get into a fatal conflict with their neighbor.
47	8	"The War Next Door"	July 21, 2018
A family likes everything about its new Garden Grove, California home except the mockingbirds that perch and squawk in the backyard lemon tree; the family seeks to scare them off, igniting a feud with its neighbors that spins out of control until someone lies dead.
48	9	"Dead Men Tell No Tales"	July 28, 2018
A Louisville, Kentucky man who is meticulous about his lawn bickers with a new neighbor who doesn't have the same priorities; the feud between the two men escalates, ultimately ending in an episode of shocking violence.
49	10	"Family Values"	August 4, 2018
Living in her family home in Colorado, a woman befriends her new neighbors, only to be plunged into a nightmare of threats, violence and betrayal; after her brother steps up to protect her, blood will be spilled and lives will be shattered forever.

=== Season 6 (2019) ===
No. overall	No. in season	Title	Original release date
50	1	"A Killer View"	August 1, 2019
A young family builds their dream home in the Kentucky Hills community of Grayson, Kentucky, but their slice of heaven turns into a hellish experience for the quiet couple living next door; a dispute over a shared road leads to fireworks, fury and cold-blooded murder.
51	2	"Games of Homes"	August 8, 2019
New neighbors disrupt the relative harmony that has existed between residents of Crockery Township, Michigan for years; alliances change and terror reigns until a winter storm puts a bloody end to the feud.
52	3	"House of Shards"	August 15, 2019
In Lovelady, Texas, a childish joke between neighbor kids turns into an all-out war when the adults get involved, and, for some, the laughter will end forever.
53	4	"Deadly Turn"	September 21, 2019
A couple escapes the dangers of the big city and moves to the country; however, they begin to suspect their new neighbors are involved in the drug trade, leading to a bloody conflict with children caught in the crossfire.
54	5	"Fireworks on Fury Lane"	September 28, 2019
A firefighter moves into a family-friendly neighborhood with his wife and child, but the rambunctious teenagers living next door drive him over the edge.
55	6	"Not in My Yard"	October 5, 2019
A rash of break-ins shatters the peace in a tight-knit community of Bedford Heights, Ohio; when residents take sides, good friends turn into deadly enemies.
56	7	"Screaming Oaks"	October 12, 2019
A U.S. Army veteran living in Titusville, Florida goes out of his way to make his neighbors feel welcome, but when a child's birthday gift goes missing, it takes only 37 days for the friendships to end in a killing spree.
57	8	"Rural Madness"	October 19, 2019
Differences over how to enjoy life in a rural neighborhood of Mann Court in Cleveland County, North Carolina quickly escalate into a feud that comes to a bloody end on the road where it began.
58	9	"Mailbox Madness"	October 26, 2019
Granite Falls, Washington neighbors take sides after someone decides to build a dream home on their quiet street; longtime friends turn into hardcore enemies, and death is right around the corner.
59	10	"Boom Town"	November 2, 2019
In a tight-knit, working class neighborhood in Flint, Michigan, a new family commits a slight against a community member causing all of their neighbors to turn against them and leading to an explosive conclusion.

=== Season 7 (2021) ===
No. overall	No. in season	Title	Original release date
60	1	"Hell in Hawaii"	May 7, 2021
A handyman, living rent-free in the Diamond Head home of a generous friend, grows increasingly paranoid about his neighbors; filming them constantly and fighting with them incessantly until conflict escalates out of control and culminates in explosive violence.
61	2	"I'm Not Moving"	May 14, 2021
A man returns from a work stint out of state to find that his neighbor has taken over his property to run a chop shop, resulting in an intractable feud that engulfs two families and doesn’t end until one of the combatants lies dead.
62	3	"Backyard Blood"	May 21, 2021
A man’s dream comes true when he buys his parents' house in Ridley Township, Pennsylvania and moves his family into it, only to discover that his neighbor on the other side of the fence holds a decades long grudge against him that won’t be resolved until one of them lies dead.
63	4	"Bloodland"	May 28, 2021
A young family buys a rural piece of paradise, but the gate on their land that prevents neighbors from accessing their property becomes an angry, and ultimately fatal, bone of contention.
64	5	"The Enemy Upstairs"	June 4, 2021
When a new tenant in a Harlem apartment building has his advances toward his upstairs neighbor rebuffed, his anger sets off a chain of accusations, threats and fights that culminate in bloodshed and shocking tragedy.
65	6	"Old Friends, Bad Neighbors"	June 11, 2021
What starts as an idyllic relationship between neighboring best friends and business partners in Wake Forest, North Carolina takes a wrong turn and ends up in threats, restraining orders, litigation and a triple homicide.
66	7	"What's Mine Is Mine"	June 18, 2021
A couple moves into their dream home on the same street where they’ve lived for years, only to find themselves engulfed in a wrenching conflict with their neighbor who believes he’s the rightful owner of their property.
67	8	"Bloodshed on Beattie Street"	June 25, 2021
A former police chief who owns most of the homes on his street gets into constant conflict with a young renter who doesn't respect his authority. The war between them intensifies until blood flows down the street of their cul-de-sac.
68	9	"Sour Grapes"	July 2, 2021
Two women with a shared wall between their townhouses in Fresno, California become increasingly volatile with each other as their once friendly relationship disintegrates. Food fights, physical altercations, and mutual vandalism will finally come to a bloody climax.
69	10	"Fence Face Off"	July 9, 2021
The decision to build a fence after problems with dogs off the leash leads to bigger problems.
70	11	"Philly Fallout"	July 16, 2021
The building of a backyard shed destroys a years-long close relationship between two neighbors and ignites a vicious conflict that sees property destroyed, pets killed, and finally, two people shot to death in cold blood.
71	12	"Law and Disorder"	July 23, 2021
A former cop moves into a close-knit neighborhood in Stevensville, Maryland. Conflict soon arises with the whole community over dogs, noise, and other disturbances that keep piling on and ratcheting up until a boiling point is reached, guns are drawn, and blood is spilled.
72	13	"Sin City Shootout"	July 30, 2021
On a quiet cul de sac, a contractor helps his neighbor rent the home beside him, unwittingly trapping himself between an increasingly unhinged presence on one side and the man's hostile parents on the other. It's a conflict that will end in bloodshed.

=== Season 8 (2022) ===
No. overall	No. in season	Title	Original release date
73	1	"Blizzard Of Blood"	June 13, 2022
A single woman and her two young sons believe they have found an ideal new apartment in Biddeford, Maine, but their overbearing landlord and neighbor soon turns their idyllic situation into a living hell of arguments and intimidation that finally ends in bloodshed.
74	2	"Appalachian Vendetta"	June 20, 2022
Once-friendly neighbors on a mountain road in Clendenin, West Virginia become sworn enemies after one family calls police about a theft -- violating the unspoken tradition of leaving authorities out of disputes; years of conflict finally culminate with shots fired.
75	3	"The Next Door War"	June 27, 2022
An army veteran delivers a parcel to his neighbour that lands in his mailbox mistakenly. Instead of receiving gratitude, he ignites a war between the two military men that spirals out of control until the feud finally ends in a hail of bullets.
76	4	"Unwelcome to the Neighborhood"	June 27, 2022
The unofficial mayor of an idyllic suburban street in West Goshen Township locks horns with the new neighbour who shows no respect for local values; disagreements escalate to arguments, threats, and property damage, ending in brutal violence that shatters two families.
77	5	"Other People's Property"	July 25, 2022
The mountain road between them fails to keep two long-time neighbours from tormenting each other; seemingly small events bring their decades-long hostility to a bloody boil, and property lines become battle lines in a fight to the death.
78	6	"A Clockwork Killing"	August 1, 2022
An apartment-dwelling family finds their peace and quiet shattered when a loud neighbor moves into the unit directly overhead; the conflict engulfs both sides resulting in flying fists, drawn weapons, and a man left bleeding out in the hallway.
79	7	"A Ticking Time Bomb"	August 15, 2022
A long-time resident of a suburban street in Woodlawn, Maryland descends into a morass of delusion, anger and paranoia that turns him against innocent neighbours; he eventually becomes wholly unhinged and unleashes his violent wrath upon his small Baltimore community.
80	8	"Gone to the Dogs"	August 22, 2022
A retired couple in Port St. Lucie, Florida pleases a family with young children when they move in next door. Then the new neighbours' dog attacks the children's mother, setting off a vicious conflict that ends in two shocking murders.
81	9	"Blood on the Lawn"	September 12, 2022
A five-year relationship between neighbours in Minneapolis falls apart when one borrows the other's lawnmower and supposedly returns it broken. Camaraderie morphs into rage, threats, and physical violence until, finally, a bloody murder devastates the community.
82	10	"The Filth and the Fury"	September 19, 2022
A retired couple's golden years shatter when a troubled army veteran moves in next door and makes their lives hell with his appalling behaviour; they declare war, fighting vicious battles until one of these neighbours turns up dead.
83	11	"Under Surveillance"	September 26, 2022
A man returns to his hometown of Dalraida, a suburb of Montgomery, Alabama, after years away. He receives a warm welcome from the residents until the noise from a new neighbour's puppies turns him into a vengeful menace who goes to war with the entire community -- none of whom may survive.
84	12	"Hell Bent"	October 3, 2022
A brutal sharp-instrument stabbing attack in an alley in East Vancouver, Vancouver, BC, left Ronald William March from Burnaby, BC dead in August 2012. The Vancouver Police Department found the man who was the most likely suspect, Lance Wraye Standberg, age 47, due to the history of altercations between the two men. March had actually moved to a new apartment to get away from previous assaults by Standberg, but Standberg stalked and killed him. In the end, Standberg was sentenced to life in prison with the possibility of parole after 25 years.
85	13	"Inferno of Hate"	October 10, 2022
A lifelong resident of his neighborhood in Akron, Ohio despairs when he sees it descend into vice and criminality. Vowing to restore it to an oasis of clean living, he turns his fiery wrath on all those he deems responsible with horrifically tragic results. Note: This is the first two-hour special in the series.

=== Season 9 (2023/2024) ===
No. overall	No. in season	Title	Original release date
86	1	"The Secret Wife"	October 16, 2023
The residents of Spring, Texas are shocked when a neighbor's captive wife escapes custody with her child, aided by another family. Sparks fly as families square off, culminating in murder.
87	2	"Bullets in the Snow"	October 16, 2023
After years of a married couple ruling their street in Plains Township, Pennsylvania, a new neighbor who doesn't abide by them moves in; years of tension fester between the two parties until one is pushed over the edge, resulting in a shocking double-execution.
88	3	"Vendetta in Vegas"	October 23, 2023
A Baptist pastor moves in next-door to a free-spirited older woman in suburban Las Vegas, leading to years of back and forth accusations of dog theft, intimidation and drug use; once the agitation reaches biblical proportions, violent retribution is wrought.
89	4	"Commanded to Kill"	October 30, 2023
A mentally ill young Ontarian's paranoia leads him to plot against his innocent Hamilton, Ontario neighbors. Over months his mental state declines until he commits a late night shooting that impacts the whole neighborhood.
90	5	"Full Frontal Attack"	November 6, 2023
A family lends a friend a place to stay but kicks her out after a blowup; instead of moving away, she buys a house across the street, kicking off a years long dispute ending in a hail of bullets, blood, death, and a community in shock.
91	6	"Bones of Contention"	November 13, 2023
Two Deltona, Florida neighbors who are down on their luck bond over their struggle; when one buries the other in debt with a hustle gone wrong, things fall apart, but their co-dependence keeps them entwined until an act of revenge.
