= 9 Channel Nine Court =

Bell Media/CTV studio complex in Toronto

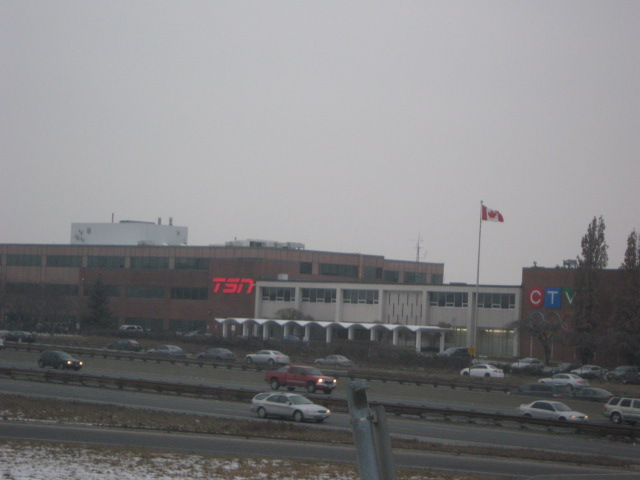
- 9 Channel Nine Court as seen from Ontario Highway 401
- Alternative names: 9 Dave Devall Way; CTV Toronto Studios; CFTO-TV Studios; Bell Media Agincourt

General information
- Location: 9 Channel Nine Court; Toronto, Ontario; M1S 4B5
- Coordinates: 43°46′58″N 79°15′26″W
- Current tenants: CTV Television Network; CFTO-DT; CTV News Channel; TSN; USA Network; CP24
- Owner: Bell Media

9 Channel Nine Court (alternatively known as the CTV Toronto Studios, CFTO-TV Studios, Glen Warren Studios or Bell Media Agincourt and temporarily known as 9 Dave Devall Way) is an office and studio complex owned by Bell Media (formerly CTVglobemedia) in the Agincourt neighbourhood of Scarborough, Toronto, Ontario, Canada. The civic address of the complex refers to the over-the-air channel on which CFTO-TV, the building's original tenant, broadcast. It is located at the northwest corner of the intersection of Highway 401 and McCowan Road near the Scarborough City Centre.

== History ==
CTV Television Network started using the studio for CTV News's local Toronto broadcasts in the mid-1960s; its head offices were located in Downtown Toronto. Original programming included the children's show The Professor's Hideaway. The 80 hectares (200 acres) land for the facility was once part of the property of settler George Scott (1795-1865). It was the Scott's farm from 1829 to 1943, and remained farmland until the suburbinzation of Metropolitan Toronto in the 1950s and the establishment of the Scarborough City Centre made the land attractive to locate a large scale television facility, freed from the limitations of space of its Downtown offices.

The station was acquired by CFTO's parent, Baton Broadcasting, in 1997. It is now home to CTV, its flagship station CFTO-DT (CTV Toronto), and The Sports Network (TSN). It was previously the headquarters of CTVglobemedia and its predecessors until it was relocated to 299 Queen Street West in 2008 when it became Bell Media.

Many scenes in the 1976 film Network were filmed within the studios and control facilities of 9 Channel 9 Court. This includes the famous scene where Howard Beale (portrayed by Peter Finch) proclaimed "I'm as mad as hell, and I'm not going to take this anymore!"

== Operations ==
In addition to CTV and CFTO, channels based at the Agincourt complex include:

- CP24 - located in the space overlooking the CTV newsroom and set.
- CTV News Channel
- CTV Specialty Television's assets:
  - CTV Nature Channel
  - CTV Speed Channel
  - CTV Wild Channel
  - TSN
  - USA Network

The complex also houses the master control facilities for several other CTV stations in Eastern and Central Canada, specifically:

- CJOH-DT Ottawa
- CKCO-DT Kitchener
- CFCF-DT Montreal
- CKY-DT Winnipeg
- CTV Northern Ontario

CTV 2 had its master control facilities moved here in 2011, housing the following stations:

- CKVR-DT Barrie
  - CKVP-DT Pelham
- CFPL-DT London
- CHWI-DT Wheatley/Windsor
- CHRO-DT Pembroke/Ottawa
- CTV 2 Atlantic
- CTV 2 Alberta

In addition the building also serves as the home for the technical operations of Bell Media's all-sports radio station in Toronto CHUM which launched on April 13, 2011.

== TSN, Sportsnet, and the "parking lot" ==
From 2001 until early 2008, both TSN and its main competitor Rogers Sportsnet were based at the Agincourt complex. Sportsnet, originally controlled by CTV before the latter's acquisition of TSN in 2000, had been based there since its launch in 1998, but did not move out immediately after TSN moved in.

Hence, when on-air hosts, such as Darren Dreger, moved from one channel to the other, it was referred to as "crossing the parking lot" or, less commonly, "crossing the street". Some at Sportsnet had complained about feeling like "poor country cousins" to CTV and TSN at Agincourt.

This peculiarity had been made light of by a couple of notable hosts on Rogers Sportsnet. Bob McCown, a radio host on Rogers-owned CJCL, had constantly commented on his show Prime Time Sports (a simulcast of his radio show on The Fan 590) that Sportsnet executives throw bottles across the street at the TSN studios. In addition, Sportsnet Connected anchor Sean McCormick had openly stated on-air that he drives to work with his wife, Jennifer Hedger, who anchors SportsCentre on TSN.

This arrangement ended on April 30, 2008, when Rogers Sportsnet moved broadcast operations from the Agincourt complex to a new studio in the Rogers Building, a cluster of buildings in the Mount Pleasant-Jarvis Street area of downtown Toronto.

== Other Bell Media facilities in Toronto ==
Alongside 9 Channel Nine Court, several other Bell Media properties are operated from other facilities in the Toronto area:

- Several other Bell Media television channels, including some of which that were acquired from CHUM Limited– such as Much, CTV Comedy Channel, CTV Drama Channel, CTV Life Channel, BNN Bloomberg, CTV Sci-Fi Channel, E! and Oxygen True Crime are operated from 299 Queen Street West, formerly known as the "CHUM-City Building". This location also serves as the current home of CTV's entertainment news program etalk, the corporate head office of Bell Media and the CFTO/CP24 Downtown Toronto news bureau.
- Studios for Bell Media's radio stations including CHUM (AM), CHUM-FM, CFRB and CKFM-FM are currently located at 250 Richmond Street West at Richmond and Duncan streets which is adjacent to 299 Queen Street West. There is a bridge walkway that currently joins these two buildings together.
