= Telegram Corporation =

Canadian media company

Telegram Corporation was a Canadian media company created under a joint venture between John W. H. Bassett's Toronto Telegram newspaper and businessman John David Eaton (a member of the prominent Eaton family), as one of three co-owners of CFTO-TV in 1960. When the Toronto Telegram was shut down in 1971, the company was renamed Baton Broadcasting Incorporated (after the Bassett and Eaton families).

Baton Broadcasting was renamed once again to Baton Broadcast System (BBS) in 1994. The Eatons sold their media stake in 1998, and the Bassetts retained sole control of BBS. By then, Baton had acquired controlling interest in CTV, of which CFTO was the flagship. It changed its name to CTV Inc. later in 1998.
