= MediaTelevision =

Media Television is a Canadian television newsmagazine series created by Moses Znaimer, which aired weekly on Citytv and NewNet from 1991 to 2004. It was also syndicated internationally, airing in over 100 countries around the world at some point during its run.

The show, subtitled "The Modern Art and Science of Persuasion", offered a behind the scenes examination of the worlds of media, marketing, technology, the internet, print, radio, and television.

It was one of the first syndicated programs to employ a videographer whose role was as camera, interviewer, and host all rolled into one. Media Television's primary contribution was its unique examination of worldwide advertising in an intelligent manner.
