= Investigation Discovery (Canada) =

- Country: Canada
- Broadcast area: Nationwide

Programming
- Language: English

Ownership
- Owner: Rogers Sports & Media (branding licensed from Skydance)
- Sister channels: Discovery Channel; Food Network; HGTV; Magnolia Network

History
- Launched: January 1, 2025; 22 months ago

Links
- Website: Investigation Discovery

Investigation Discovery (ID) is a Canadian discretionary service owned by the Toronto-based Rogers Sports & Media. It is based on the U.S. cable network of the same name, and focuses on true crime programming.

== History ==
Investigation Discovery is one of five specialty networks that were relaunched by Rogers on January 1, 2025, after the June 2024 announcement that it had acquired the rights to Warner Bros. Discovery (WBD) factual and lifestyle brands. The channel succeeds an iteration of ID that was majority-owned by Bell Media, which concurrently relaunched as a Canadian version of ID competitor Oxygen through a partnership with NBCUniversal.
