= CTV Speed Channel =

Canadian specialty TV channel

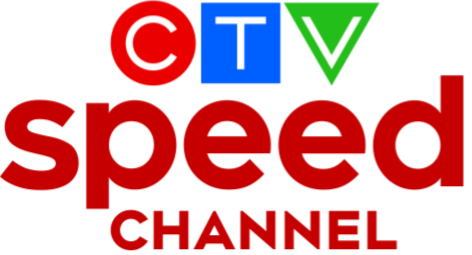
- Country: Canada
- Broadcast area: National
- Headquarters: 9 Channel Nine Court, Scarborough, Toronto, Ontario

Programming
- Picture format: 1080i (HDTV)

Ownership
- Owner: CTV Specialty Television (Bell Media) (953285 Canada Inc.)
- Sister channels: CTV; CTV2; CTV Comedy Channel; CTV Drama Channel; CTV Life Channel; CTV Nature Channel; CTV Sci-Fi Channel; CTV Wild Channel; Oxygen; USA Network

History
- Launched: December 19, 2005; 20 years ago
- Former names: Discovery HD Theatre (2005–2009); Discovery HD (2009–2010); Discovery World HD (2010–2012); Discovery World (2012–2015); Discovery Velocity (2015–2025)

Links
- Website: CTV Speed Channel

CTV Speed Channel is a Canadian discretionary specialty channel owned by CTV Specialty Television, a joint venture between Bell Media and ESPN, LLC. It broadcasts factual and reality-style series related to the automotive industry and transportation, as well as occasional live motorsports events.

This channel was founded on December 19, 2005 as Discovery HD Theatre (a Canadian spelling of HD Theater) by Bell Globemedia and Discovery Communications. Two years after the U.S. counterpart was rebranded to HD Theater, it was renamed to Discovery HD in 2009. It did not immediately follow its U.S. counterpart's rebrand to Velocity (now Discovery Turbo) in 2011, and instead rebranded as Discovery World HD in 2010 (shortened to simply Discovery World in 2012). In 2015, the channel rebranded as Discovery Velocity, shifting primarily to programming related to automobiles and transport.

In January 2025, the channel was rebranded as CTV Speed Channel, due to Bell losing its rights to Warner Bros. Discovery factual brands and related programming to Rogers Sports & Media. Rogers does not plan to launch a new linear channel for Motor Trend, with its programming to instead be distributed via digital platforms.

== History ==
Beginning in August 2003, CTV had operated a channel known as Discovery Channel HD, which served as a high-definition simulcast of the main Discovery Channel lineup, where applicable. In August 2005, the Canadian Radio-television and Telecommunications Commission (CRTC) approved an application for a new category 2 digital service, Discovery HD Theatre (based on the U.S. channel of the same name), covering many of the same genres as Discovery Channel, but with a separate lineup consisting exclusively of high definition programming. Discovery HD Theatre replaced Discovery Channel HD on December 19, 2005. While maintaining the same format, the channel was renamed Discovery HD in 2009.

In June 2010, CTVglobemedia announced that it would launch three new Discovery-branded channels in Canada, among them included a re-branding of Discovery HD as Discovery World HD (later renamed Discovery World in 2012) on August 2, 2010, with a new lineup aiming to "showcase a beautiful and brilliant portrait of our world in vivid high definition". Discovery Channel relaunched its HD simulcast in June 2011.

In January 2015, Bell Media announced that Discovery World would be re-branded as Discovery Velocity on February 12, 2015. It was a Canadian version of the U.S. channel Velocity—which was the current format of the network's original U.S. counterpart. With the re-branding, the network increased its focus on automotive-oriented series, although selected non-automotive programs from Discovery World were carried over.

On June 10, 2024, Rogers Sports & Media announced it had reached an agreement with Warner Bros. Discovery (WBD) for Canadian rights to its lifestyle brands beginning in January 2025, which were subsequently confirmed to include Discovery Velocity / Motor Trend. This led to a lawsuit by Bell, which claimed the move would violate previous non-compete clauses with WBD; the matter was settled out of court in October. Rogers announced that Motor Trend content would move to its on-demand and streaming platforms including Citytv+, rather than a new linear channel (In December 2024, Hearst Communications acquired Motor Trend Group and most of its assets from Warner Bros. Discovery, and the channel was rebranded as Discovery Turbo in January 2026).

On October 17, 2024, Bell Media announced the channel would rebrand as CTV Speed Channel on January 1, 2025, and would continue to feature programming "for automotive and thrill-seeking enthusiasts". At some point after the rebranding, WBD divested its stakes in the channel, making CTV Specialty Television the sole owner.

== Programming ==
The channel primarily broadcasts programming related to vehicles and transportation, including reality and documentary-style programming. It also carries motorsports programming.

Since the rebranding as CTV Speed Channel, the channel has sublicensed content from sister network TSN, including rights to selected NASCAR events as overflow for TSN and USA Network (particularly the Craftsman Truck Series), as well as rights to Mecum Auctions sublicensed from ESPN (which itself replaced Motor Trend as broadcaster of the events in 2025 under a new contract).

== See also ==
- Discovery Turbo
- Discovery HD (International)
