= CTV Comedy Channel =

Canadian comedy TV channel

- Country: Canada
- Broadcast area: National
- Headquarters: 9 Channel Nine Court, Scarborough, Ontario

Programming
- Picture format: 1080i HDTV (downscaled to letterboxed 480i for the SDTV feed)
- Timeshift service: CTV Comedy Channel East; CTV Comedy Channel West

Ownership
- Owner: BCE Inc.
- Parent: Bell Media
- Sister channels: CTV; CTV2; CTV News Channel; CTV Drama Channel; CTV Life Channel; CTV Nature Channel; CTV Sci-Fi Channel; CTV Speed Channel; CTV Wild Channel; Much; Oxygen; USA Network

History
- Launched: October 17, 1997; 29 years ago
- Former names: The Comedy Network (1997–2019)

Links
- Website: www.ctv.ca/comedy

CTV Comedy Channel (often shortened to Comedy) is a Canadian English-language discretionary specialty channel owned by BCE Inc. subsidiary Bell Media which focuses primarily on comedy programming and operates two time-shifted feeds, running on Eastern and Pacific Time Zone schedules.

The channel first launched on October 17, 1997, as The Comedy Network by a consortium of Baton Broadcasting, Shaw Communications, Astral Media (Note: which would later be acquired by this channel's current ownership) and Les Films Rozon. Through various acquisitions over the years, the network is solely owned by Bell since 2001.

CTV Comedy Channel originally sourced most of its programming from the U.S.-based cable network Comedy Central. In the years since the channel's inception, and with the eventual shuttering of its sister channel in 2019, the network would move some of its programming from the latter to sister channel Much before rebranding to its current name on September 12, 2019.

== History ==
First channel logo, used from 1997 to 2011. Shown here is the 3D version from 2005 to 2011.

In September 1996, 1155636 Ontario Inc. (a company majority controlled by Baton Broadcasting, with the remaining interests held by Shaw Cable and Astral Broadcasting.) was granted a television broadcasting license by the Canadian Radio-television and Telecommunications Commission (CRTC). The channel launched on October 17, 1997 as The Comedy Network, and used the slogan "Time well wasted", a parody of the slogan of U.S. channel A&E's at the time, "Time well spent".

Through various acquisitions over the years, Shaw, Astral and Les Films Rozon sold their interest in the service to Baton, which became Bell Globemedia in 2001, and renamed CTVglobemedia in 2007. BCE gained control of The Comedy Network on April 1, 2011, through its takeover of CTVglobemedia, in effective changing the company's name to Bell Media.

Second and final logo, used from 2011 to 2019.

Over the years, the channel has gone through multiple rebrands; from 2000 to 2005, the logo was given a "crudely drawn" look; the logo's colors were removed, leaving the logo black (although the logo's colors were still seen on the channel's website). In 2005, the channel's logo was changed from 2D to 3D; the logo's colors were brought back. On November 1, 2011, The Comedy Network was relaunched with a new look, consisting a new simplified logo and revamped on-air presentation. Their longtime slogan was also retired on this date.

On July 12, 2012, The Comedy Network launched a high-definition simulcast feed available through all major TV providers.

In August 2013, the CRTC denied an amendment to The Comedy Network's license, which would have reduced the amount of Canadian-produced content the network would have been required to air monthly, increase the amount of animated programming it could air from 10% of its lineup per day to 20% per month, and allow it to air films that were not Canadian-made. Bell argued that the network was at a disadvantage against BiteTV and Teletoon, because Comedy was unable to give its animated acquisitions a larger amount of exposure (such as marathons) due to the restriction. The CRTC rejected its arguments in response to complaints by the two networks cited and other unions, due to their differing natures of service and because Bell's proposed changes were intended primarily to decrease the amount of Canadian content it airs in favour of more U.S.-originated programming. By September 2013, The Comedy Network had moved a number of acquired Comedy Central programs to its sister channel Much.

In the 2017–18 season, The Comedy Network changed its primetime programming strategy to emphasize reruns of hit sitcoms such as Friends and Seinfeld, aiming to provide lead-ins with wider demographic appeal (including female viewers) for its first-run programs later in the night.

On June 7, 2018, during the CTV upfronts, it was announced that The Comedy Network would eventually rebrand as "CTV Comedy", as part of a realignment of several Bell Media channels under the CTV name. On June 8, 2019, it was revealed The Comedy Network would relaunch as CTV Comedy Channel on September 12, 2019.

== Programming ==
CTV Comedy Channel primarily airs sitcoms and stand-up comedy programming (including anthologies and specials), with much of the latter coming from the channel's association with the Montreal-based Just for Laughs comedy festival. The network also produces its own original programming, with several series (such as Puppets Who Kill, Odd Job Jack and Kevin Spencer) developing cult followings and loyal fan-bases. Puppets Who Kill, Comedy Now!, The Gavin Crawford Show, and several other Comedy original series have gone on to win Canadian Comedy Awards, including CTV's Corner Gas, which has also won six Gemini Award wins, seven Leo Award wins, and an International Emmy nomination. The channel subsequently produced a continuation of Corner Gas as an adult animation series, Corner Gas Animated.

The network has historically had a relationship with Skydance-owned Comedy Central in the U.S. In June 2007, Comedy's parent company (then known as CTVglobemedia) announced a deal for exclusive Canadian rights to the entire Comedy Central library of past and present programs on all electronic platforms, under a multi-year agreement with Viacom. For several years, Canadians attempting to visit Comedy Central websites were redirected to the Comedy Network's website. Conversely, American IP addresses trying to link to the Comedy Network page were redirected to Comedy Central's page.

In 2025 the relationship with Paramount ended and the channel now exclusively runs reruns of network television sitcoms, with no new or original programming.

== Related services ==
Alternative Comedy Network logo, mostly used on print ads

=== Comedy Gold ===
On August 2, 2010, TV Land Canada was rebranded as Comedy Gold, turning the channel into an offshoot of The Comedy Network. Comedy Gold originally focused primarily on sitcoms from the 1970s, 1980s, and 1990s. On July 24, 2019, a representative of Bell Support revealed that Comedy Gold would be shutting down anywhere between August 30 and September 1; it did so on the latter date. Prior to Comedy Gold's shuttering, on August 28, 2019, Wow Unlimited Media revealed that they would have completed their acquisition of Comedy Gold's broadcast license on August 30, 2019.

=== Comedy Go ===
As part of Bell Media's suite of Go apps for all its main channels, the Comedy Network launched its own app on April 15, 2014. As part of the launch, the video section on the Comedy Network website was renamed after the app.

Although the channel renamed to CTV Comedy Channel on September 12, 2019, the Comedy Go name was still used until Comedy Go was subsumed into the main CTV app in July 2020.
