= Investigation (TV channel) =

Canadian specialty TV channel

- Country: Canada
- Broadcast area: Nationwide
- Headquarters: Montreal, Quebec

Programming
- Language: French
- Picture format: 480i (SDTV); 1080i (HDTV)

Ownership
- Owner: (CTV Specialty Television Inc. (80%)) (Bell Media (56%) and ESPN Inc. (24%))
- Sister channels: Noovo; Canal D Oxygen; Z Canal Vie

History
- Launched: December 12, 2013
- Former names: Canal D/Investigation (2013–2016)

Links
- Website: Investigation (in French)

Investigation (formerly Canal D/Investigation) is a Canadian French-language specialty channel. Owned by Bell Media, it primarily broadcasts true crime programming. It originally launched on December 12, 2013.

== History ==
On August 10, 2011, Astral Media was granted approval by the Canadian Radio-television and Telecommunications Commission (CRTC) to launch "INVESTIGATION", described as "a national, specialty Category B service operating in the French language, devoted to exploring justice and forensic science: legal and police investigations, fraud and swindling, espionage, major trials, procedures, legal firms, coroners, forensic pathology, etc. Intended mainly for adult viewers, INVESTIGATION proposes to air magazines, documentaries, dramas and reality television shows related to justice and forensic science."

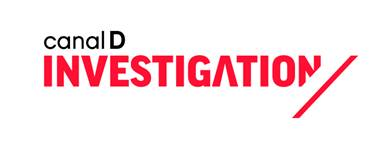
Logo used for the entire duration of the channel under the name Canal D/Investigation

Amid an acquisition deal, which would see Bell Media acquire Astral for $3.38 billion, Astral announced in October that it would launch the channel by the end of 2012. Only days later, the Bell/Astral deal was denied by the CRTC.

After a second and successful attempt at acquiring Astral on July 5, 2013, Bell Media announced in November 2013 that it would launch the channel on December 12, 2013, indicating it would be called Investigation, However, prior to the channel's launch, on December 5, when announcing programming titles the channel would air at launch, Bell Media indicated the channel would be renamed Canal D/Investigation, co-branding it with Canal D. The channel was renamed Investigation in 2016.
