= Discovery Channel (Canada) =

Canadian cable television channel

- Country: Canada
- Broadcast area: Nationwide
- Headquarters: Rogers Building, Toronto, Ontario

Programming
- Language: English
- Picture format: 1080i HDTV (downscaled to letterboxed 480i for the SDTV feed)

Ownership
- Owner: Rogers Sports & Media (branding licensed from Skydance)
- Sister channels: Citytv; Omni Television; Sportsnet; HGTV; Investigation Discovery

History
- Launched: January 1, 2025; 22 months ago

Links
- Website: Discovery Channel Canada

Discovery Channel is a Canadian exempt discretionary service owned by Rogers Sports & Media. Based on the U.S. cable network of the same name, the channel focuses primarily on programming related to nature, science, and technology.

== History ==
Discovery is one of five specialty networks that were relaunched by Rogers on January 1, 2025, after the June 2024 announcement that it had acquired the rights to Warner Bros. Discovery (WBD) factual and lifestyle brands. The channel succeeds a previous iteration of Discovery Channel that was majority-owned by Bell Media; this channel rebranded as USA Network on January 1, transitioning to a general entertainment format that maintains some of the network's previous factual programming.

== Programming ==
In May 2026, Rogers announced that it had ordered Deadliest Catch: Northern Edge, a spin-off of Deadliest Catch following a fleet of snow crab fishers in the North Atlantic off the coast of Newfoundland and Nova Scotia.
