= CTV Wild Channel =

Canadian specialty television channel

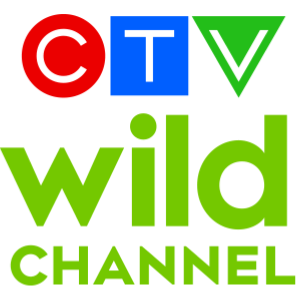
- Country: Canada
- Broadcast area: National
- Headquarters: 9 Channel Nine Court, Scarborough, Ontario

Programming
- Picture format: 1080i (HDTV) (2011–present); 480i (SDTV) (2001–present)

Ownership
- Owner: CTV Wild Canada Company (CTV Specialty Television)
- Sister channels: CTV; CTV 2 CTV Comedy Channel; CTV Drama Channel; CTV Life Channel; CTV Nature Channel; CTV News Channel; CTV Sci-Fi Channel; CTV Speed Channel; Oxygen; USA Network

History
- Launched: September 7, 2001; 24 years ago
- Former names: Animal Planet (2001–2024)

Links
- Website: CTV Wild

CTV Wild Channel is a Canadian English language discretionary specialty channel owned by CTV Wild Canada Company, a subsidiary of CTV Specialty Television. The channel primarily broadcasts factual series and documentaries relating to animals.

The network was originally established in 2001 as a Canadian version of the U.S. cable network Animal Planet, expanding upon CTV's existing relationship with Discovery Communications for Discovery Channel; and the channel upon its launch was operated by the Animal Planet Company, a joint venture of CTV Speciality Television, Discovery Communications and BBC Studios.

In January 2025, the channel was rebranded as CTV Wild Channel, due to Bell losing its rights to Warner Bros. Discovery factual brands and related programming to Rogers Sports & Media. Rogers does not plan to launch a new linear channel for Animal Planet, with its programming to instead be distributed via digital platforms.

== History ==
In November 2000, CTV Inc. was granted approval by the Canadian Radio-television and Telecommunications Commission (CRTC) to launch Animal Planet, a service described as being "broadly based on family entertainment that will combine high-quality Canadian programming and attractive series and documentaries from the U.S. counterpart, in the United States.

The channel was launched under its current ownership structure (with the exception of Bell Media, wherein Bell Globemedia, later renamed CTVglobemedia, owned its shares at the time) on September 7, 2001.

On June 30, 2008, Animal Planet unveiled a new on-air appearance, including a new logo and graphics, to align itself with the American service which had updated its appearance earlier that year.

Ownership changed once again when BCE (a minority shareholder in CTVglobemedia) acquired 100% interest in CTVglobemedia and was renamed to Bell Media on April 1, 2011.

On June 10, 2024, Rogers Sports & Media announced it had reached an agreement with Warner Bros. Discovery (WBD) for Canadian rights to its lifestyle brands beginning in January 2025, which were subsequently confirmed to include Animal Planet. This led to a lawsuit by Bell, which claimed the move would violate previous non-compete clauses with WBD; the matter was settled out of court in October. Rogers announced that Animal Planet content would move to its on-demand and streaming platforms including Citytv+, rather than a new linear channel. On October 17, 2024, Bell Media announced the channel would rebrand as CTV Wild Channel on January 1, 2025. The channel will carry over certain Canadian series previously commissioned by Bell for Animal Planet Canada, as well as other animal-related content from third-party distributors.

At some point after the rebranding, WBD and BBC divested its stakes in the channel, making a sole owner.

== Animal Planet HD ==
On June 17, 2011, Bell Media announced that it would launch Animal Planet HD, a high definition (HD) simulcast of the standard definition feed, by the end of 2011. The channel launched on December 15, 2011, initially on Bell Fibe TV and Shaw Cable and launched at a later date on Telus TV. About six years later, Shaw Direct added it and 5 other HD channels (Business News Network, Cooking Channel, Crime & Investigation, OWN, and Travel + Escape) to the channel listing on September 21, 2017.

== Logos ==
2008-2020

2020–2025

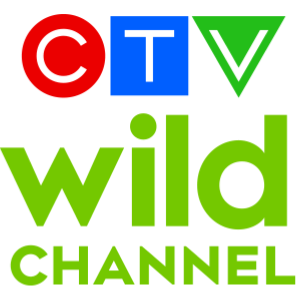
2025–present
