= CTV Nature Channel =

Canadian English language specialty channel

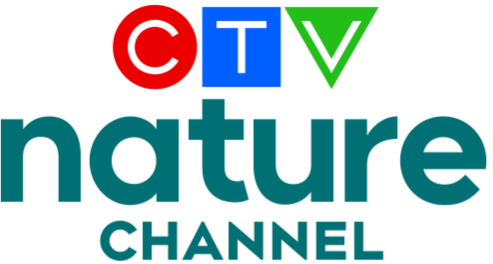
- Country: Canada
- Broadcast area: National
- Headquarters: 9 Channel Nine Court, Scarborough, Ontario, Canada

Programming
- Picture format: 1080i HDTV (downscaled to letterboxed 480i for the SDTV feed)

Ownership
- Owner: CTV Specialty Television; (CTV Nature Canada Company)
- Sister channels: CTV; CTV 2 CTV Comedy Channel; CTV Drama Channel; CTV Life Channel; CTV Sci-Fi Channel; CTV Speed Channel; CTV Wild Channel; Oxygen; USA Network

History
- Launched: August 15, 2001; 24 years ago
- Former names: Discovery Civilization Channel (2001–2010); Discovery Science (2010–2025)

Links
- Website: CTV Nature

CTV Nature Channel is a Canadian discretionary specialty channel owned by CTV Specialty Television, a joint venture between Bell Media and ESPN, LLC via license CTV Nature Canada Company. It broadcasts factual and reality-style series related to science, nature, and history.

The network was originally launched on August 15, 2001 as Discovery Civilization Channel, a digital cable spin-off from Discovery Channel based on the U.S. network of the same name (now Investigation Discovery), focusing on programming related to history and international culture. On September 27, 2010, the channel relaunched as Discovery Science, becoming a Canadian version of Science Channel.

On January 1, 2025, the channel relaunched as CTV Nature Channel, due to Bell losing the rights to Warner Bros. Discovery factual and lifestyle brands to Rogers Sports & Media (who will primarily distribute Science Channel programming through its streaming and on-demand platforms, foregoing a new specialty channel).

== History ==
CTV Nature Channel was licensed by the Canadian Radio-television and Telecommunications Commission (CRTC) on December 14, 2000 as Discovery Civilization Channel Canada. The application was granted to CTV Inc., and was later transferred to its subsidiary, CTV Specialty Television Inc., in which ESPN owns a 20% interest. The channel was originally described in regulatory documents as "a national English-language Category 2 specialty television service dedicated to bringing the diverse people and cultures of the world to Canadian viewers. The service will be dedicated to exploring and understanding the roots of human development and learning from other cultures and traditions."

The channel was launched on August 15, 2001 as Discovery Civilization Channel, with programming devoted to human civilization and history. The channel was intended to be a Canadian version of a U.S. channel of the same name, which was later reformatted and renamed as Discovery Times, and later became Investigation Discovery (a brand which would later launch in Canada via a rebranding of CourtTV Canada).

Previous logo until 2021.

On June 4, 2010 CTVglobemedia announced that Discovery Civilization Channel would be rebranded as Discovery Science on September 27, 2010, serving as a Canadian version of the U.S. network Science Channel.

On June 10, 2024, Rogers Sports & Media announced it had reached an agreement with Warner Bros. Discovery (WBD) for Canadian rights to its lifestyle brands beginning in January 2025, which were subsequently confirmed to include Discovery Science. This led to a lawsuit by Bell, which claimed the move would violate previous non-compete clauses with WBD; the matter was settled out of court in October. Rogers announced that Science Channel content would move to its on-demand and streaming platforms including Citytv+, rather than a new linear channel.

Discovery Science logo from 2021 until January 1, 2025.

On October 17, 2024, Bell Media announced the channel would rebrand as CTV Nature Channel on January 1, 2025. CTV Nature will take over much of Discovery's previous mandate within the Bell Media portfolio as it transitions to a general entertainment format under the USA Network brand, repurposing certain Canadian factual series previously commissioned by Bell, as well as other content related to science, nature, and history from third-party distributors.

At some point after the rebranding, WBD divested its stakes in the channel, making a sole owner.

== HD feed ==
On June 17, 2011 Bell Media announced that it would launch Discovery Science HD, a high definition (HD) simulcast of the standard definition feed, by the end of 2011. The channel was launched on December 15, 2011 on Bell Fibe TV and on September 11, 2012 on Telus Optik TV. Shaw Direct began using it on August 8, 2018.

== International distribution ==
- Jamaica – distributed on Flow Cable systems.
- Bahamas – distributed on Cable Bahamas systems.
- Trinidad and Tobago – distributed on Flow Cable systems.
- Brazil – distributed on NET systems.
- Chile – distributed on VTR Digital Cable systems.
- Mexico – distributed on Cablevision
