= Oxygen (Canadian TV channel) =

Canadian discretionary service

- Country: Canada
- Broadcast area: Nationwide
- Headquarters: 299 Queen Street West, Toronto, Ontario

Programming
- Language: English
- Picture format: 1080i (HDTV); 480i (SDTV)

Ownership
- Owner: Bell Media (Note: Branding licensed from Versant.)
- Sister channels: CTV; CTV 2 CTV 2 Alberta; CTV Comedy Channel; CTV Drama Channel; CTV Life Channel; CTV Nature Channel; CTV Sci-Fi Channel; CTV Speed Channel; CTV Wild Channel; USA Network; CLT (2001–2010); Canal D (French language); Investigation (French language)

History
- Launched: September 7, 2001; 25 years ago
- Replaced: Court TV (American feed)
- Former names: Court TV Canada (2001–2010); Investigation Discovery (2010–2025)

Links
- Website: Oxygen

Oxygen (branded as Oxygen True Crime) is a Canadian discretionary service owned by Bell Media. Based on the American cable network of the same name, the channel focuses on true crime programming, including original productions and imports from its American counterpart.

The channel was launched on September 7, 2001, as a Canadian version of Court TV, by Learning and Skills Television of Alberta Ltd., which was then owned by CHUM Limited, although the American Court TV channel became available in Canada through cable and satellite providers as a foreign channel approved by the Canadian Radio-television and Telecommunications Commission in 1997. CHUM was acquired by CTVglobemedia in 2007.

Two years after its American counterpart was relaunched as TruTV, Court TV was relaunched as Investigation Discovery on August 30, 2010, as part of a licensing arrangement between CTVglobemedia and Discovery Communications. On January 1, 2025, after Bell lost its rights to Warner Bros. Discovery factual and lifestyle brands to Rogers Sports & Media, the channel relaunched as Oxygen as part of a licensing agreement with NBCUniversal, maintaining its true crime format. Rogers concurrently launched a new iteration of ID the same day.

== History ==
=== As CourtTV Canada ===
In November 2000, Learning and Skills Television of Alberta, a company majority owned by CHUM Limited with a 60% ownership and owners of Access, was granted permission by the Canadian Radio-television and Telecommunications Commission (CRTC) to launch a television channel called "The Law & Order Channel", described as "a national English-language Category 2 specialty television service that will feature entertainment programming about police, law, the courts, emergency and medical response teams, disaster and relief operations featuring people and organizations that uphold law and order in our society."

The channel was launched on September 7, 2001 as Court TV Canada. The channel replaced the American Court TV service, which was available on many television service providers throughout Canada as an eligible foreign service from 1997.

Court TV Canada logo from 2005 to August 29, 2010.

On February 15, 2005, CHUM completed the purchase of the remaining interest in LSTA, bringing its ownership to 100%. A year later, in July 2006, Bell Globemedia (later renamed CTVglobemedia) announced that it would purchase CHUM for an estimated CAD$1.7 billion, included in the sale was LSTA and its interest in CourtTV Canada. The sale and was approved by the CRTC in June 2007, and the transaction was completed on June 22, 2007. In 2008, LSTA (then known as Access Media Group) was wound up into CTV Limited (the renamed CHUM Limited).

=== As Investigation Discovery ===
Former logo as the original home of Investigation Discovery, used until 2025.

The original CourtTV was relaunched as TruTV in 2008, though the Canadian version continued to use the CourtTV branding. On August 30, 2010, CTV announced a new licensing agreement with Discovery Communications, under which Court TV Canada would be rebranded as a Canadian version of Discovery's true crime brand Investigation Discovery. It is the only Discovery-branded channel operated by Bell Media that neither Discovery, nor ESPN Inc. (via CTV Specialty Television, Inc.), holds an ownership stake in.

On September 10, 2010, Bell Canada (a minority shareholder in CTVglobemedia) announced that it planned to acquire 100% interest in CTVglobemedia for a total debt and equity transaction cost of CAD$3.2 billion. The deal was approved by the CRTC on March 7, 2011, and was finalized on April 1 of that year, on which CTVglobemedia was rebranded Bell Media.

On June 17, 2011, Bell Media announced plans to launch a high definition simulcast feed of Investigation Discovery, titled Investigation Discovery HD, by the end of the year. The HD feed was launched on December 15, 2011 on Bell Fibe TV and later on Telus Optik TV; The HD feed later began to be carried on Bell Satellite TV on December 13, 2012, then Bell Aliant and NorthernTel in the mid-2010s. The HD feed was added to Shaw Direct's lineup on October 16, 2018. It is yet to be launched on Shaw Cable and some smaller providers.

=== As Oxygen ===
In June 2024, Rogers Sports & Media announced that it had acquired the rights to all Warner Bros. Discovery lifestyle and factual television brands in Canada beginning January 1, 2025. Rogers stated that it would concurrently launch a new Investigation Discovery linear channel on that date.

On October 17, 2024, Bell Media announced a licensing agreement with NBCUniversal to relaunch two of its former Discovery-branded channels, with ID becoming a Canadian version of NBCU's true crime brand Oxygen on January 1, 2025. The relaunched channel retained its existing Canadian original programming, but with Oxygen library programs replacing those acquired from Investigation Discovery.

Oxygen marked Bell's third active channel partnership with NBCUniversal, following the relaunch of Star! as E! in 2010, and the concurrent relaunch of Discovery Channel as USA Network in 2025; Comcast and Bell Media's predecessors were also co-owners of OLN from 1997 to 2008.

== Programming ==
The channel primarily airs true crime programming sourced from its American parent network (such as Dateline, The Real Murders of..., and Snapped). It has also commissioned several original Canadian productions, such as Fear Thy Neighbor (a co-production with French-language sister network Investigation and the American Investigation Discovery) and Forensic Factor.

== See also ==
- Crime & Investigation (Canadian TV channel), a similar service owned by Corus Entertainment
