= Bell Media =

Canadian media company

Bell Media Inc.

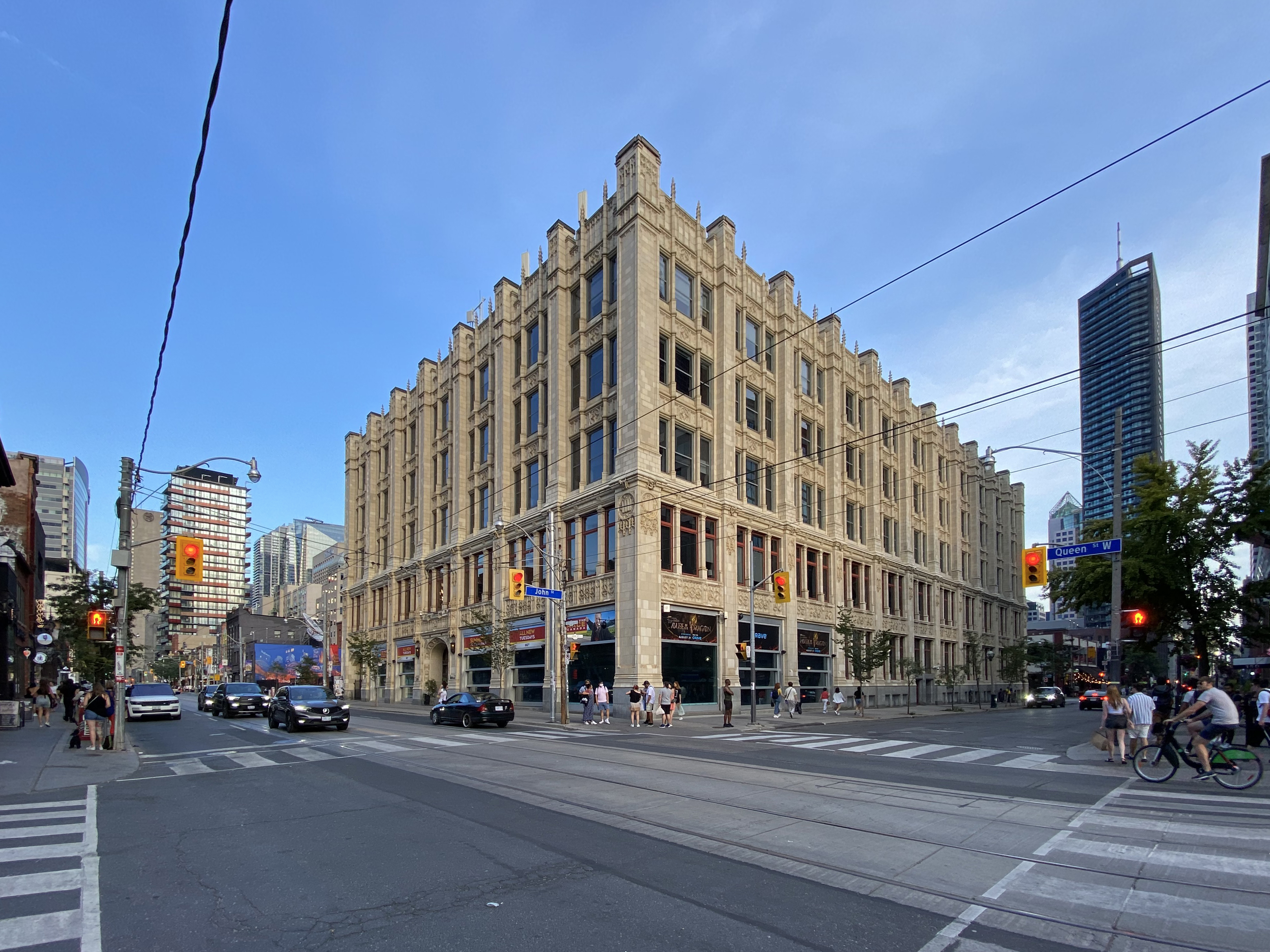
- 299 Queen Street West, the former headquarters of CHUM Limited, serves as the headquarters of Bell Media, in 2022.
- Formerly: CHUM Limited (1945–June 22, 2007); Telegram Corp. (1960–1971); Baton Broadcasting (1971–1998); CTV Inc. (1998–2001); CTV Productions (1998–2011); Bell Globemedia Inc. (2001–December 31, 2006); CTVglobemedia Inc. (January 1, 2007–March 31, 2011)
- Type: Subsidiary
- Industry: Mass media
- Founded: 1960; 66 years ago (Telegram Corporation); 2001; 25 years ago (Bell Globemedia Inc.); January 1, 2007; 19 years ago (CTV globemedia); April 1, 2011; 15 years ago (Bell Media Inc.)
- Headquarters: 299 Queen Street West, Toronto, Ontario, Canada
- Area served: Canada
- Key people: Sean Cohan (president); Stewart Johnston (SVP, Sales and Sports); Karine Moses (SVP, Content Development and News); Jerrell Jimerson (SVP, Product & Experience)
- Number of employees: 5,000+
- Parent: BCE Inc.
- Divisions: Bell Media Radio
- Subsidiaries: CTV Specialty Television (joint venture with ESPN Inc.)
- Website: www.bellmedia.ca

Bell Media Inc. (French: Bell Média inc.) is a Canadian media conglomerate that is the mass media subsidiary of BCE Inc. (formerly known as Bell Canada Enterprises, the owner of telecommunications company Bell Canada). Its operations include national television broadcasting and production (including the CTV and CTV 2 television networks), radio broadcasting (through iHeartRadio Canada), digital media (including Crave) and Internet properties (including the now-defunct Sympatico portal).

Bell Media is the successor-in-interest to Baton Broadcasting (later CTV Inc.), one of Canada's first private-sector television broadcasters. Although the company was founded in 1960 as Telegram Corporation, the current enterprise traces its origins to the establishment of Bell Globemedia Inc. in 2001 by BCE and the Thomson family, combining CTV Inc. (which BCE had acquired in 2000) and the operations of the Thomson family's newspaper, The Globe and Mail. BCE sold the majority of its interest in 2006 (after which the company was renamed CTVglobemedia Inc. in 2007), but in 2011, BCE acquired the entire company (excluding The Globe and Mail) and changed the name to Bell Media Inc.

== Origins ==
=== Baton Broadcasting ===
For all practical purposes, Bell Media is the successor to Baton Broadcasting Incorporated (/ˈbeɪtɒn/ BAY-ton), which by the late 1990s had become one of Canada's largest broadcasters.

Formed in 1960 as Baton Aldred Rogers Broadcasting Ltd., the company was originally created to establish Toronto's first private television station, CFTO-TV. The name of this company derived from its initial investors, including the Bassett and Eaton families (Baton), and Aldred-Rogers Broadcasting (owned by broadcaster Joel Aldred and Ted Rogers); Foster Hewitt was also an initial investor, but in a much smaller role. Aldred sold his shares in 1961, followed by Rogers by 1970, thereby relieving their names from the company title. With the Bassett and Eaton families firmly in control, the company went public in the early 1970s.

CFTO was one of the charter affiliates of CTV when that network formed in 1961, becoming the network's flagship. In 1966, Baton became a part-owner in the network when it was reorganized as a station-owned cooperative. The Board of Broadcast Governors was initially skeptical about the proposal to turn CTV into a cooperative. Since CFTO was by far the largest and richest station in the network, the BBG feared Baton would take advantage of this to dominate the network. However, it approved the deal after Baton and the other owners included a provision in the cooperative's bylaws stipulating that the eight station owners would each have a single vote regardless of audience share. Additionally, if one owner ever bought another station, the acquired station's shares would be redistributed among the remaining owners so that each owner would still have one vote out of eight.

In 1972, Baton began purchasing other CTV affiliates, starting with CFQC-TV in Saskatoon. This did not, however, give Baton a substantially higher investment in CTV, since its shares were redistributed among the other owners. As a result, Baton still had only one vote out of eight.

In 1987, Baton began a concerted effort to take over CTV. It started this drive with a further expansion into Saskatchewan, purchasing CKCK-TV in Regina, Yorkton twinstick CKOS-TV/CICC-TV, and CBC affiliate CKBI-TV Prince Albert. A twinstick CTV affiliate was soon launched in Prince Albert, CIPA-TV.

In the late 1980s, Baton applied for a high-power station in Ottawa on channel 60. The licence was approved by the Canadian Radio-television and Telecommunications Commission (CRTC), appealed to federal cabinet by rival broadcasters, and ultimately sent back to the CRTC for review. However the license was surrendered when Baton was instead able to acquire the local CTV affiliate, CJOH-TV, from Allan Slaight's Standard Broadcasting.

In 1990, Baton purchased the MCTV system of twinstick operations in Pembroke, North Bay, Sudbury, Timmins, and the Huron Broadcasting twinstick in Sault Ste. Marie. In 1993, Baton purchased CFPL-TV in London, CKNX-TV in Wingham and received a license for a new independent station, CHWI-TV, in Windsor.

In 1991, the company launched Ontario Network Television, a secondary affiliation carried by Baton's CTV and independent stations in Ontario. This was expanded in 1994 into the Baton Broadcast System (BBS), which included Baton's Saskatchewan stations. BBS was meant as a backup in case Baton's ongoing acquisitions did not translate into control of CTV itself. A year earlier, CTV had been recently restructured into a corporation, with each owner holding a 14.3% stake in the network. However, any future acquisitions by Baton would come with all of that affiliate's CTV shares. It was around this time that former CBC executive Ivan Fecan joined the company.

=== Baton-Electrohome alliance and CTV Inc. (1996–2000) ===
In 1996, the CRTC approved two major deals involving Baton. First was the acquisition of CFCN-TV in Calgary from Rogers Communications, which had recently purchased Maclean Hunter. Second, Baton and Electrohome—owner of CKCO-TV in Kitchener and CFRN-TV in Edmonton—formed an alliance, under which the companies would share ownership of CFCN; Baton's stations in Saskatchewan and its independent stations in southwestern Ontario; and Electrohome's CKCO. The deals doubled Baton's own interest in CTV to 28.6%. However, as part of the deal, Baton took control of Electrohome's CTV vote, allowing it to command 42.9% of CTV's shares.

In January 1997, Baton-Electrohome's "Vancouver Television" proposal emerged as the CRTC's choice for the new independent station in Vancouver, beating out four other competitors. The new station, CIVT-TV, would compete directly with Western International Communications's two CTV affiliates in the market when it was launched that fall.

On February 25, 1997, the Baton-Electrohome alliance and CHUM Limited announced that several stations would be swapped between them. Baton-Electrohome would acquire CHUM's Atlantic Television System (ATV), consisting of four CTV affiliates in the Maritimes, the Atlantic Satellite Network (ASN), and a further 14.3% in CTV. CHUM would receive Baton's independent stations in southwestern Ontario, as well as CHRO-TV in Pembroke, which had recently disaffiliated from CTV. The Baton-Electrohome alliance now held 57.2% of CTV.

Shortly thereafter, Electrohome announced it would sell its broadcasting assets—including CFRN, its interest in the alliance, and its CTV shares—to Baton in exchange for cash and shares in Baton. These two deals were approved by the CRTC in August. Baton now held controlling interest in CTV, triggering a put option that allowed the other owners to sell their stakes in the network while still keeping their stations. Accordingly, Baton acquired the remaining CTV shares from WIC and Moffat Communications (Newfoundland Broadcasting, owner of CJON-TV, had effectively relinquished its vote when CTV became a corporation) that fall.

The BBS television system was merged into CTV, with the company itself being renamed CTV Inc. the following year. The Eatons' remaining shares, representing 41% of Baton (estimated at CA$450 million), were sold off to the general public in early 1998. By the end of 2001, nearly all CTV stations were consolidated under network ownership (including one replacement).

In 1999, CTV Inc. acquired NetStar Communications, a company that was spun out from the broadcasting division of the Labatt Brewing Company after its acquisition by Interbrew in 1995. The sale was approved by the CRTC March 24, 2000, but CTV had to divest either Netstar's TSN or their own Sportsnet; they chose to sell the latter to Rogers.

=== Bell Globemedia (2000–2006) ===
At the beginning of the 2000s, Bell Canada Enterprises (BCE) acquired CTV Inc. (including the NetStar assets) and bought The Globe and Mail, folding the two into a new media venture, Bell Globemedia Inc (BGM).

This venture was masterminded by former Bell Canada chief executive Jean Monty, largely as a response to Canwest's purchase of the Southam newspaper chain as well as the trend of media convergence, particularly the AOL-Time Warner merger. Monty believed that to survive in a changing technological landscape, and in particular to drive subscriptions to satellite television provider Bell ExpressVu and internet service provider Bell Sympatico, BCE had to have control over content.

The transaction was structured as follows. In 2000, BCE acquired CTV Inc. in an all-cash transaction valued at CA$2.3 billion. Soon after, Monty arranged to have Thomson Corporation transfer control of The Globe and Mail, the Toronto-based national newspaper, to BCE in exchange for a significant interest (20%) in the merged CTV/Globe entity. The Thomson family's holding company (The Woodbridge Company Limited) invested in the company directly to obtain an additional 9.9% interest, and it later bought Thomson Corporation's interest.

The resulting company (Bell Globemedia) consisted of CTV, The Globe and Mail, and the Internet portal then known as Sympatico-Lycos (Lycos was later replaced by MSN). Fecan was named the combined firm's president and CEO (a role he remained in for the duration of the BGM/CTVglobemedia era). After Monty resigned and was replaced by Michael Sabia in 2002, it became clear that Monty's vision was not producing anything near the desired results, notwithstanding the good results for the individual units, particularly the CTV network.

The following years provided a few cosmetic changes in BGM's assets. In 2001, CTV acquired CKY-TV in Winnipeg and CFCF-TV in Montreal, and moved the CTV affiliation in British Columbia to CIVT, replacing two affiliates that had been purchased by Canwest. That fall also brought the launch of the first digital specialty channels, including several owned by CTV.

The company acquired partial ownership in TQS in 2002, the Sympatico portal was sold back to Bell Canada, while a further investment from the Thomsons (whose ownership increased to 31.5%) funded the acquisition of 15% of Maple Leaf Sports & Entertainment. However, beginning in 2003, BCE management began to refer to BGM as a non-core asset; as a result, much attention was given to the likely sale of the company, and potentially a breakup into several different pieces.

On December 2, 2005, Bell Canada Enterprises (BCE) announced that it would sell an 8.5% interest to The Woodbridge Company Limited (increasing their total ownership to 40%), a 20% interest to Torstar, and a 20% interest to the Ontario Teachers' Pension Plan. BCE retained 20% of the group—a condition that ensured that Bell Satellite TV, Sympatico, and other Bell units continued to have access to Bell Globemedia (BGM) content. The transaction closed on August 30, 2006.

This deal put to rest any rumors about a possible breakup of the company. However, Torstar's involvement led to additional media concentration concerns, mainly from media unions. Torstar insisted it was committed to maintaining the editorial independence of the Globe and its own Toronto Star, and ultimately there were no major regulatory hurdles due to this.

On July 12, 2006, BGM announced a friendly bid to take over CHUM Limited for an estimated $1.7 billion. The acquisition would bring the secondary broadcast system (Citytv), other stations including CablePulse24, MuchMusic, Star!, Bravo!, and Space, and all of CHUM's radio stations, into the BGM fold. BGM originally announced that CHUM's A-Channel stations, Access, CKX-TV, MusiquePlus, MusiMax, Canadian Learning Television, SexTV: The Channel and BGM's own OLN would not be retained. On September 7, 2006, in order to pay for the CHUM acquisition, BGM sold additional shares to its existing shareholders. BCE did not participate in the refinancing; the net effect was an increase in Teachers' ownership to 25%, while BCE's interest was reduced to 15%.

=== CTVglobemedia (2007–11) ===
The logo for CTVglobemedia since January 1, 2007.

As a result of BCE's reduced ownership in the company, Bell Globemedia was renamed CTVglobemedia Inc. on January 1, 2007.

In April of that year, Rogers Communications announced a tentative deal to purchase A-Channel, CKX-TV, Access Alberta, Canadian Learning Television, and Cooking Channel from CTVglobemedia, if its purchase of CHUM was approved. Astral Media made a similar deal for CHUM's 50% interest in MusiMax and MusiquePlus.

That June, the CRTC approved the CHUM takeover, on condition that CTV sell off the Citytv stations, because of the CTV network's owned-and-operated station stations serving the very same cities. CTV ultimately chose to keep the A-Channel stations along with the rest of CHUM Ltd. assets it had previously said it would sell, except for MusiquePlus/MusiMax. Rogers Communications was announced as the buyer of the Citytv stations on June 11, 2007, and the CHUM acquisition was finalized on June 22.

Subsequently, CTVglobemedia, Inc. sold off its interests in various non-core channels. Rogers purchased several of these assets, including CTV's 33% interest in OLN in late 2007, as well as radio stations CHST-FM in London, Ontario and CHBN-FM in Edmonton, Alberta in 2010. Corus Entertainment would acquire Canadian Learning Television, Cooking Channel, and Drive-In Classics for a combined $113 million. TQS entered bankruptcy protection and was ultimately acquired by Remstar (which renamed the network "V"). Meanwhile, Glassbox Television acquired Travel + Escape in late 2010. In two cases, the operations were closed down, specifically CBC affiliate CKX-TV in Brandon, Manitoba (which left the air in October 2009 after a deal to sell that station to Bluepoint Investment Corporation fell through) and the A station in Wingham, CKNX-TV (which left the air one month prior to CKX and is now a rebroadcaster of the A station in London, CFPL-TV).

CTVglobemedia acquired Toronto station CFXJ-FM from Milestone Radio in 2010.

On September 10, 2010, BCE announced plans to re-acquire 100% of the company's broadcasting arm, including CTV Inc. Under the deal, Woodbridge, Torstar, and Teachers' would together receive $1.3 billion in either cash or equity in BCE, while BCE would also assume $1.7 billion in debt (BCE's existing equity interest was $200 million, for a total transaction value of $3.2 billion). Woodbridge would also regain majority control of The Globe and Mail Inc., with BCE retaining a 15% interest. The overall deal was expected to close by April 2011. However, the sale of The Globe, which did not require CRTC approval, was completed in late December 2010. The deal was approved by the CRTC on March 7, 2011, and was officially closed on April 1, 2011. On the same day, CTVglobemedia was renamed as Bell Media Inc..

== Post-2011 developments ==
=== Expansion (2011–2013) ===
On December 9, 2011, the Ontario Teachers' Pension Plan announced the sale of its majority stake in Maple Leaf Sports & Entertainment to BCE and its rival, Rogers Communications, in a deal valued at around $1.32 billion. Additionally, Larry Tanenbaum increased his stake in the company to 25%. The deal closed in August 2012.

On March 16, 2012, BCE announced that it had entered in an agreement to acquire Montreal-based broadcaster Astral Media for an estimated value of $3.38 billion; the assets of which were to be incorporated into Bell Media. The acquisition was primarily centered on Astral's premium services (such as The Movie Network and its stake in HBO Canada) and its French-language radio and television stations. Bell planned to use Astral's premium offerings to enhance its own multi-platform services to compete against the likes of services such as Netflix, and its French media outlets to better compete against the dominant Québecor Média. The merger was notably opposed by a coalition of competing cable providers (which included Cogeco, EastLink, and Vidéotron—the last of which is also owned by Québecor Média, who felt that Bell's control of a majority of Canadian media would harm consumer choice, and lead to increased carriage fees which could cripple smaller cable companies.

BCE's first proposal was denied by the CRTC in October 2012; the commission believed that the combined company would have had too much market power. Soon afterward, Bell and Astral began to negotiate a second proposal that would involve selling most of Astral's English-language television channels in order to quell fears by the CRTC. On March 18, 2013, the Competition Bureau cleared the revised proposal. Unlike the previous deal, which would have given Bell a 42% share of the English-language television market, the new deal would only give Bell a total market share of 35.7%, but still increase its French-language market share to 23% (in comparison to 8% before). Following hearings by the CRTC in May 2013, the CRTC approved Bell's acquisition of Astral Media on June 27, 2013. The deal is subject to conditions, including the requirement to provide fair treatment to its competitors, to not impose "restrictive bundling practices" on Astral's premium movie channels, invest $246.9 million over the next seven years on Canadian-produced programming, and to maintain the operation and local programming levels of all of its television stations through 2017. The CRTC also approved Bell's proposed exemptions for maintaining ownership of Montreal's CKGM. Bell put Family, Disney XD, the two Disney Junior services, MusiMax, MusiquePlus, and five radio stations up for sale, while Corus Entertainment acquired Historia, Séries+, and Teletoon from Astral and competitor Shaw Media.

On June 6, 2013, Bell announced that Bravo would be its first network to implement a TV Everywhere service, which would allow subscribers to Bravo on participating television service providers to stream video on demand content and the Bravo channel live via the Bravo Go app. Apps for some of its other networks were also released over the following months.

=== Layoffs, new partnerships (2014–2017) ===
In December 2014, Bell Media launched CraveTV, a subscription video on-demand service. Initially, the service was available only through television providers; Bell Media president Kevin Crull argued that Bell did not want the service to cannibalize its linear television business, because its content "[would not] exist if you didn't have the traditional TV system. So you really can't sustainably have one without the other."

On April 9, 2015, Crull stepped down as president of Bell Media, and was replaced by Mary Ann Turcke, the subsidiary's former head of media sales. The move came following allegations reported by The Globe and Mail that, after the CRTC's March 2015 decision to mandate that pay television providers offer a la carte packages, Crull ordered all Bell-owned news properties, including CTV News, not to air any remarks by CRTC chairman Jean-Pierre Blais during reports regarding the decision. Although the CTV News Channel program Power Play and a report aired on the local evening newscasts complied with Crull's order, the CTV National News that night defied Crull's demand by airing a story on the changes that included remarks by Blais. CTV News president Wendy Freeman, Ottawa bureau chief Robert Fife, and the program's anchor Lisa LaFlamme felt that the inclusion of remarks by Blais was necessary due to the nature of the story. In response to the dismissal, BCE CEO George A. Cope explained that the journalistic independence of its news operations was "paramount importance to our company and to all Canadians".

Shortly after taking the position, Turcke was criticized for remarks that considered the use of virtual private network services to evade geo-blocking and access the U.S. version of subscription video on demand service Netflix to be "stealing".

In late August 2015, Bell Media began a series of layoffs, which included directors and vice presidents. On November 6, 2015, additional layoffs of 380 jobs from production, editorial, sales, and administrative roles in Toronto and Montreal were revealed. On November 17, 2015, further cuts were made, which included high-profile on-air talent from radio and television properties in Ottawa, Toronto, and Vancouver.

On November 20, 2015, Corus announced that it would wind down the operation of Movie Central, a premium television service that had been granted exclusivity in Western Canada, and cede its regional monopoly to Bell Media's The Movie Network, which was similarly restricted to Eastern Canada, allowing it to become available nationwide in 2016. Bell Media subsequently announced that it had acquired exclusive Canadian rights to all current HBO programming in Canada (rights previously shared with Corus due to its joint venture HBO Canada).

On January 6, 2016, iHeartMedia announced that it had partnered with Bell Media to launch a localized version of its online radio service iHeartRadio Canada. On January 14, 2016, CraveTV became available as a standalone service without requiring an existing television subscription.

On May 4, 2016, Bell acquired rights to the programming and branding of Canadian specialty channel Gusto TV. The channel was shut down, and re-launched on September 1, 2016, replacing M3 under its existing Category A license.

On January 31, 2017, Bell Media announced that it planned to perform another round of layoffs in 24 locations, citing various developments across Canada's broadcasting industry, as well as the impact of recent regulatory decisions (such as one that prevents the federal simsub rules from being used on the Super Bowl, whose Canadian broadcast rights are currently owned by Bell Media).

=== Randy Lennox presidency (2017–2020) ===
On February 27, 2017, Turcke left Bell to join the National Football League as president of NFL Media. She was succeeded as president by Randy Lennox. That month, Bell also announced that it had partnered with record executive Scott Borchetta to develop a new, international television format that would "uncover, develop, and promote pop culture's next musical superstars", and "leverage Bell Media's massive reach and extensive platforms to showcase musicians on the national and international stage." CTV officially announced the new series, The Launch, in April 2017.

On June 7, 2017, Wow Unlimited Media announced that it would acquire a specialty channel from the company (later revealed to be Comedy Gold; however, the sale would later be aborted, leading to the channel's shutdown in 2019) to form a new network targeting children and young adults, and provide children's television content for Bell's over-the-top ventures. As part of the purchase, BCE will take 3.4 million common voting shares in the company.

On August 9, 2017, Bell announced that it would acquire Larche Communications' four Ontario radio stations, pending CRTC approval.

On October 17, 2017, Bell Media announced its intent to acquire Historia and Séries+—two French-language networks whose Astral-owned stakes were divested during its acquisition by Bell—from Corus Entertainment for $200 million. On May 28, 2018, both transactions were blocked by the Competition Bureau, citing a condition on the Bell/Astral deal which forbade Bell from re-acquiring properties divested in the sale for 10 years after its completion.

On January 23, 2018, Bell Media announced that it had reached licensing agreements with Starz Inc. and Lionsgate, and that TMN Encore would be rebranded under the Starz brand in 2019, featuring its programming. The following month, Bell launched SnackableTV, a streaming video app with short-form content from Bell Media properties and other sources.

In April 2018, Bell Media acquired a controlling stake in the Pinewood Toronto Studios complex. In May 2018, Bell Media announced that it, along with several other parties, would contribute French-language content to Radio-Canada's subscription streaming service Ici Tou.tv Extra.

In May 2018, Bell Media laid off 17 employees, resulting in the cancellation of Discovery's Daily Planet and Space's Innerspace.

On June 7, 2018, during the CTV upfronts, it was announced that four Bell Media specialty channels would re-brand in September 2019, with the original Bravo, Comedy Network, Gusto, and Space respectively becoming CTV Drama Channel, CTV Comedy Channel, CTV Life Channel, and CTV Sci-Fi Channel. Two new ad-supported video-on-demand platforms were also announced: CTV Movies and CTV Vault (renamed CTV Throwback on launch). These rebrandings and launches will be incorporated into a larger, unified digital platform containing content from all six services. Later that day, it was also announced that Bell Media was one of two Canadian companies that had acquired a stake in the Montreal-based comedy festival Just for Laughs.

On August 16, 2018, Vice Media announced a long-term output deal with Bell Media, which would see its networks and properties hold rights to Viceland programming in Canada.

On July 24, 2019, Bell announced its intent to acquire the French-language broadcast television network V from V Media Group pending CRTC approval, as well as its streaming outlet Noovo. CTVglobemedia previously owned a 40% stake in the network prior to its sale to Remstar. On April 3, 2020, the sale was approved; as a condition of the purchase, the CRTC stated that all five V stations must air five hours of local programming per-week through the 2020-2021 broadcast year, and expanding to eight-and-a-half hours per-week in Montreal and Quebec City by 2021–2022. At least half of all local programming must be locally-reflective. The sale was closed on May 15, 2020. V would later be renamed to Noovo on August 31, 2020.

=== Wade Oosterman era (2021–2023) ===
On October 19, 2020, BCE announced that Lennox would be leaving the organization on January 4, 2021, and that Bell group president Wade Oosterman, to whom Lennox had reported, would take over operational leadership of Bell Media directly, while maintaining oversight of Bell's wireless, residential, and small-business telecom operations. BCE subsequently clarified that Oosterman had taken the title of president of Bell Media while remaining vice-chair of BCE and Bell Canada.

Immediately following Lennox's departure, Oosterman announced a new, simplified executive structure. As a result, several senior executives of Bell Media, some having served with the company's predecessors since the late 1990s, left the company; two of the three senior vice presidents reporting to Oosterman under the new structure also have roles overseeing parts of Bell's telecom business. Several other lower-level managers were laid off about two weeks later. This in turn was followed in early February by the elimination of hundreds of rank-and-file positions, including at least 210 in the company's Toronto offices alone, the removal of dedicated newsrooms for news-talk radio stations CJAD Montreal and CFRB Toronto, and the reformatting of three TSN Radio outlets as automated business news or comedy stations with little locally produced content.

In a memo announcing the end of the restructuring, Oosterman described the moves as necessary to "reflect the reality of sweeping change facing [Bell Media]" including impacts of the COVID-19 pandemic, changing media consumption patterns and "aggressive" competition from global players. They were also widely seen as indicating a corporate shift in focus away from traditional media outlets and towards Bell's streaming services like Crave and iHeartRadio. However, observers including Unifor, the main labour union representing Bell employees, questioned the need for the layoffs, given that parent company BCE had accepted $122 million in assistance through the Canada Emergency Wage Subsidy in 2020, while being able to increase its dividend payments to shareholders.

In March 2023, Bell Media acquired a minority stake in Montreal-based studio Sphere Media, producer of CTV series 19-2 and Transplant. In June 2023, BCE announced that it was cutting 1,300 positions across its telecom and media operations (around three per cent of its workforce, and of which approximately 30% were unfilled vacancies), including six per cent of positions at Bell Media (which had 5,645 employees at the end of 2022). The company also announced it would be closing or selling nine AM radio stations, some of which had changed to automated formats during previous rounds of cuts: CFRW, CKMX, CFRN, CKST, CFTE, and CJBK all closed immediately, while CKWW, CKOC, and CHAM were slated for sale to one or more third-party buyers to be named later.

BCE blamed a number of industry changes and increasing losses in its news divisions for the cuts, while questioning the regulatory priorities of the federal government and the CRTC; one BCE executive mentioned having waited for reforms on some items for years, while also citing "relentless regulatory intervention" by the CRTC to cut wireless and Internet service pricing. This rationale was questioned by union officials and other experts who felt Bell should have better prepared for industry changes, or could have waited for the full implementation of the Online Streaming Act (Bill C-11) and the Online News Act (Bill C-18).

In June 2023, The Globe and Mail reported that after the controversial dismissal of long-time CTV National News anchor Lisa LaFlamme in 2022, Oosterman was recorded urging news managers from its CTV, BNN, CP24 properties to get their journalists to "help" by providing favourable coverage when reporting on Bell as long as it did not "distort reality". Oosterman also criticized CTV for not forcing conflict between opposing viewpoints to get more viewers. Oosterman's remarks seemingly violated the company's 2015 journalistic independence policy.

On August 16, 2023, Vrak and Z were removed from Vidéotron. As a consequence, Vrak closed down on October 1, 2023.

=== Sean Cohan presidency (2023–present) ===
On October 3, 2023, BCE announced that Oosterman would be retiring from the conglomerate by early January 2024, and would be replaced as president of Bell Media by Sean Cohan, a former executive for the American media companies A&E Networks and Nielsen. On October 23, 2023, Bell Media acquired Outfront Media's Canadian business for $410 million. On October 27, 2023, Bell Media announced a co-development deal with Fox Entertainment and Neshama Entertainment (a Toronto-based studio minority-owned by Fox subsidiary MarVista Entertainment), to co-develop new programming for Bell and Fox platforms.

On February 8, 2024, BCE announced that it would cut 4,800 positions (10% of which coming from Bell Media), citing declining revenues, and new CRTC requirements mandating that the company offer wholesale access to its fibreoptic telecom networks to competitors. Due to the restructuring, Bell Media announced that it would cut most noon and weekend newscasts across all CTV stations, cut programming at CTV News Channel and BNN Bloomberg, and sell 45 of its 103 radio stations to Arsenal Media, Durham Radio, Maritime Broadcasting System, My Broadcasting Corporation, Vista Radio, Whiteoaks Communications Group, and ZoomerMedia. Bell executive Robert Malcolmson told the Canadian Press that radio was "not a viable business anymore".

MTV2 was closed on March 29, 2024. This left the main MTV network to be the last remaining licensed Paramount Global channel under Bell Media.

In April 2024, Bell Media launched a suite of free ad-supported streaming television (FAST) channels; these channels are co-branded with CTV, TSN, and Noovo, and distributed via platforms such as Samsung TV Plus and others.

On June 10, 2024, Rogers Sports & Media announced that it had acquired the rights to all of Warner Bros. Discovery's factual and lifestyle brands starting in January 2025. This would mark the end of Bell Media and CTV's long-running relationship with Discovery and its sibling networks. Bell filed a court injunction seeking to halt the agreement, arguing that their contract with WBD provides for a two-year non-compete clause ("window to adjust") if the company does not renew its licensing agreements. Rogers claims the suit is without merit.

On October 8, 2024, Bell settled with WBD and Rogers, and concurrently reached an agreement to renew its licensing agreement with the company for HBO and Warner Bros. entertainment content on Crave. Bell and WBD also entered into an agreement to co-produce new programming, and license Bell Media original productions for international distribution outside of Canada. On October 17, Bell announced planned rebrands and relaunches for its Discovery-branded networks taking effect January 1, 2025. Animal Planet, Discovery Science, and Discovery Velocity would be brought under Bell's CTV-branded specialty networks as CTV Wild, Nature, and Speed Channel respectively. Meanwhile, Bell announced a new licensing agreement with then-parent company NBCUniversal, which would see Discovery Channel and Investigation Discovery relaunched as Canadian versions of USA Network and Oxygen respectively. In an unrelated move, MTV Canada would also wind down on December 31, 2024, with Bell citing “changing audiences”.

On March 26, 2025, Bell Media acquired a majority stake in Sphere Media's international distribution arm Abacus Media Rights (which Sphere had originally acquired in 2024). The company will handle international distribution for Bell Media's programming catalogue. In an interview with Deadline Hollywood, Cohen also stated that the company had begun an internal initiative known as "Northern Lights" to pursue more international production partnerships, explaining that they had "a responsibility to elevate what gets made and the perception of Canadian content, Canadian creative, in the eyes of the global community". In August 2025, Bell hired former Disney Streaming executive Jerrell Jimerson for its new position as head of digital products and experiences.

In October 2025, Bell Media announced a partnership with Fox-owned free ad-supported streaming television (FAST) service Tubi to co-develop programming and handle Canadian advertising sales. As part of this agreement, Bell also added its suite of FAST channels to Tubi's live TV catalogue. In June 2026, Bell Media and associate Blink49 Studios signed a deal with Celeste Parr and Punctuation Media for new television programs.

== Operations ==
Bell Media's largest operation is in TV, where it directly owns the following broadcast television assets:

- CTV, Canada's oldest, largest, and most-watched private broadcast television network, including 22 owned-and-operated stations, two affiliates, and one news-only affiliate.
- CTV2, a secondary television system that presently consists of four terrestrial television stations in Ontario and three in British Columbia, as well as two cable/satellite-only channels: one in Alberta; and the other in Atlantic Canada.
- Noovo, a private broadcast television network in Quebec, including five owned-and-operated stations.

Bell Media owns 27 English and 12 French specialty television channels, frequently in partnership with U.S. companies which operate similar channels.

Genre	Channels	International partner
CTV Entertainment	CTV Comedy Channel, CTV Drama Channel, CTV Life Channel, CTV Nature Channel, CTV Sci-Fi Channel, CTV Speed Channel, CTV Wild Channel, Much	
Licensed Entertainment	E!, Oxygen, USA Network	Licensed by Versant
Sports	TSN1, TSN2, TSN3, TSN4, TSN5	ESPN (part-owner/licensor)
Premium	Crave 1, Crave 2, Crave 3, Crave 4, HBO 1, HBO 2, Starz 1, Starz 2	HBO Max, HBO, Starz
News	BNN Bloomberg, CP24, CTV News Channel	BNN Bloomberg licensed by Bloomberg
French Entertainment	Canal D, Canal Vie, Investigation, Z	
French Sports	RDS, RDS2, RDS Info	ESPN (part-owner/licensor)
French Premium	Cinépop, Super Écran 1, Super Écran 2, Super Écran 3, Super Écran 4	
Pay-per-view	Vu! and Venus	n/a
Radio	iHeartRadio Canada	iHeartMedia (licensor), Premiere Networks (supplier of American programming for Orbyt Media)
Advertising-supported video on demand (AVOD)	CTV Movies, CTV Throwback	Sony Pictures (content partner)
Free ad-supported streaming television (FAST)	CTV@Home, CTV Gets Real, CTV Gridlock, CTV Laughs, CTV News, Corner Gas Channel, The Mightiest by CTV, Noovo cinéma, Ça c’est drôle, Les débatteurs Noovo, TSN The Ocho	

Through its Bell Media Radio division, the company is also Canada's largest private-sector radio broadcaster and operates a localized version of iHeartMedia's iHeartRadio platform in Canada, even owning the radio syndication company Orbyt Media, which supplies its American programming from iHeartMedia's Premiere Networks division.

In addition, Bell Media also owns television & radio production studios and websites associated with all of the above properties, as well as the TheLoop.ca (formerly Sympatico.ca) Internet portal previously operated through Bell Canada.

Bell Media has six locations:

- 9 Channel Nine Court, Toronto
- 299 Queen Street West, Toronto
- Bell Media Tower, 1800 McGill College Avenue, Montreal
- Bell Media Building, 1755 René Lévesque Boulevard, Montreal
- 750 Burrard Street, Vancouver

== Logo history ==
CTV inc. (1990–2018)

CHUM Limited
(used until June 22, 2007)

CTVglobemedia
(January 1, 2007–March 31, 2011)

Bell Media
(April 1, 2011–present, English)

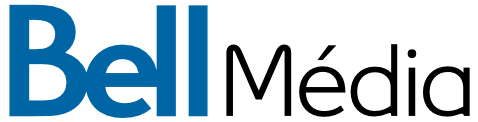
Bell Media
(April 1, 2011–present, French)

== See also ==
- Bell Canada
- Media ownership in Canada
- Canada's Olympic Broadcast Media Consortium
- Rogers Sports & Media
- WildBrain
- Corus Entertainment
- Stingray Group
  - Stingray Radio
- CBC
- Ontario Teachers' Pension Plan
- Torstar Corporation
- List of Canadian television channels
