= Much (TV channel) =

Canadian young adult television channel

Coordinates: 43°38′59″N 79°23′26″W

- Country: Canada
- Broadcast area: Nationwide
- Headquarters: 299 Queen Street West, Toronto, Ontario, Canada

Programming
- Picture format: 1080i HDTV (downscaled to letterboxed 480i for the SDTV feed)

Ownership
- Owner: CHUM Limited (1984–2007); CTVglobemedia (CTV Limited) (2007–2011); BCE Inc. (2011–present)
- Parent: Bell Media
- Sister channels: CTV Comedy Channel

History
- Launched: August 31, 1984; 42 years ago
- Former names: MuchMusic (1984–2013; 2021–present)

Links
- Website: Much

Much is a Canadian English language discretionary specialty channel. Owned by Bell Media, the channel primarily airs general entertainment programming targeting a teenage and young adult audience. It is headquartered at 299 Queen Street West in downtown Toronto, formerly billed on-air as the "MuchMusic World Headquarters".

This channel was originally launched on August 31, 1984, as MuchMusic, under the ownership of CHUM Limited, the owner of Citytv Toronto, though "Much" has been the branding most commonly seen on-air since 1997. In 2006, Bell Globemedia acquired MuchMusic and its parent CHUM Limited, but regulatory limits in media ownership forced CHUM to sell off the Citytv stations to avoid conflicts with CTV stations in the same markets. CTVglobemedia retained the ownership of MuchMusic along with CP24 and the small market A-Channel stations. Much was acquired yet again by Bell Media in 2011.

This channel originally focused on music programming, including blocks of music videos and original series focusing on Canadian musicians. Due to shrinking interest in music television because of the growth of online platforms, MuchMusic had increasingly focused on non-music programming targeting a young adult audience, such as comedy, films, and reality shows, and the network cancelled the majority of its music programming in the 2010s due to budget and staffing cuts. This channel was officially renamed "Much" in 2013 in reflection of its decreasing reliance on music-related programming. From 2021 onward, the "MuchMusic" branding has been used exclusively for its digital media network, which operates in parallel with the linear "Much" TV channel.

Since its launch, MuchMusic had expanded globally such as the United States in 1994 (now known as Fuse), Europe and beyond. This channel began to launch multiple spinoffs throughout its existence under the Much brand such as MuchMoreMusic in 1998 targeting older adult demographic and a suite of channels ranging from hip hop, rock, retro and request call-in channels throughout the 2000s. In addition, MuchMusic also had good relations with U.S.-based MTV which also aired a number of programs on that channel since its inception. This led to Craig Media launching its own MTV channel in 2001 leading to a rivalry between the two companies in the early 2000s until CHUM acquired Craig in 2004. MTV would return to Canada in 2006 although it was licensed as a talk channel and since CTV acquired Much in 2007, Much and MTV became sister channels despite the decreasing of music programming within the 2010s decade. After the closure of MTV Canada in 2024, Much would take over the channel's remaining programming.

As a former Category A service, Much was required to be carried on the basic service of all digital cable providers across Canada. The channel was, and still is, typically offered optionally at the discretion of providers.

== History ==
=== Under Moses Znaimer and CHUM (1984–2006) ===
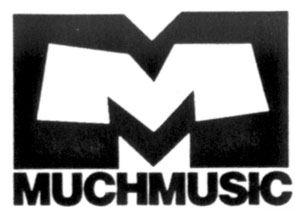
Second Much logo used from 1993 to 1997. This symbol was first introduced in 1992

MuchMusic was licensed on April 2, 1984, by the Canadian Radio-television and Telecommunications Commission (CRTC) to CHUM Limited. It had faced competition from two other proposed services. One of them, CMTV Canadian Music Television, was deemed not to have sufficient financial resources. The third applicant was Rogers Radio Broadcasting. The CRTC believed that the Canadian market could only support one music video service and CHUM's proposal was chosen because of various commitments it had made and the company's expertise in music programming. The station was initially patterned on City Limits, an overnight weekend rock music show which had aired on sister station CITY-TV since 1983.

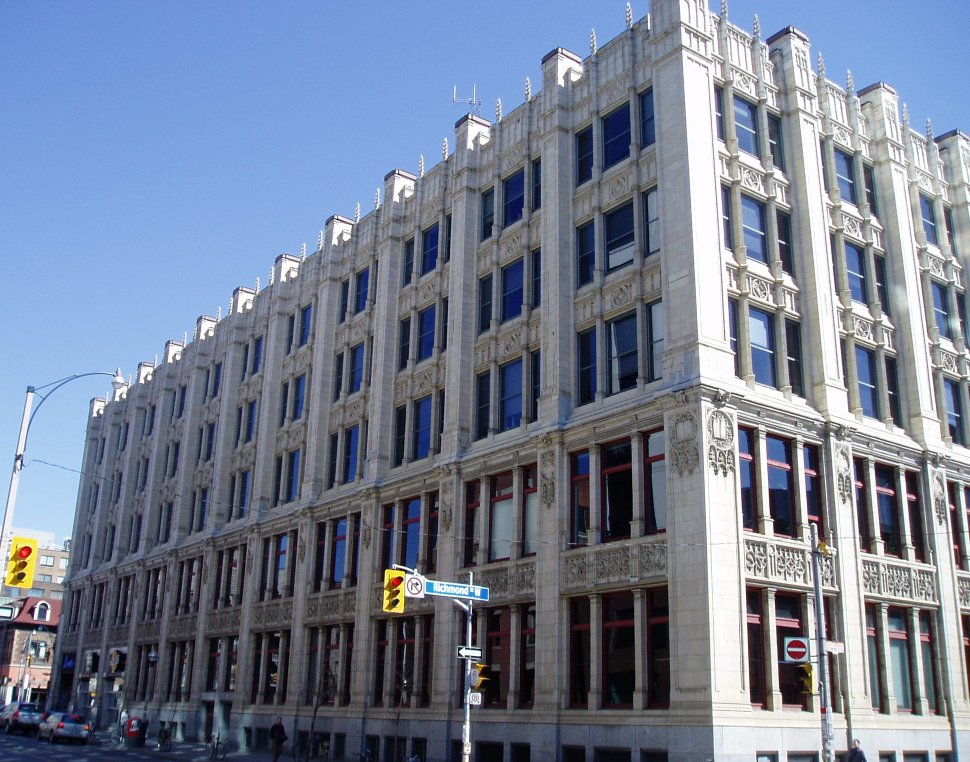
The MuchMusic World Headquarters is located on 299 Queen Street West in Downtown Toronto, as seen in April 2005. The channel has been based there since 1987.

Shortly thereafter, MuchMusic (Note: Basically, "Much" was an anagram of "CHUM", its owner.) was launched on August 31, 1984, as one of the first Canadian cable specialty channels. It was headed by the channel's founders John Martin and Moses Znaimer. The first video played on MuchMusic was "an early music-to-film synchronization short from the 1920s which featured Eubie Blake performing Snappy Songs." The first video made specifically for television air play was Rush's "The Enemy Within". MuchMusic's slogan, and on-air advertising, was "The Nation's Music Station".

The station was originally located at CITY-TV's 99 Queen Street East studios, but by May 1987, Much, along with CITY, moved to the renovated 299 Queen Street West.

Making use of CHUM's facilities and production teams, the channel produced many specialty musical and variety shows, including the long-running dance show Electric Circus and the late 1980s game show Test Pattern, and Citytv shows such as City Limits, The Power Hour, The MuchMusic Spotlight and The New Music also became integral parts of the MuchMusic schedule.

The channel's format consisted primarily of an eight-hour daily block which mixed scheduled shows with VJ-hosted general "videoflow", which would then be repeated two more times to fill the 24-hour schedule (originally a six-hour block repeated three times). Some variance from this model was seen with the late-night shows City Limits and Too Much 4 Much (a show that featured panel discussions surrounding controversial music videos that the channel had refused to air in regular rotation), and live specials such as Intimate and Interactive.

For the first few years of the channel, it was classified as a pay television service and was therefore offered largely in bundles along with other pay-stations such as First Choice and TSN, and would occasionally offer free preview weekends for non-subscribers. The subscriber count was at 500,000 customers by December 1984. In December 1987, MuchMusic received permission from the CRTC to move to basic cable lineups beginning on September 1, 1988; in the interim cable operators could offer the channel as a negative-option expanded basic channel.

In the 1990s and 2000s, the channel ran an annual "MuchTemp" contest, whose winner would get a two-month summer paid internship at the station to learn about the television business. The most noted winner of the contest, Rick Campanelli (1994), stayed on with MuchMusic in other roles after the end of his internship, and became a full VJ in 1996; one of the longest-serving VJs in the station's history, he remained with the station until leaving in 2005 to become one of the hosts of Entertainment Tonight Canada.

A US version of MuchMusic, originally known as "MuchMusic USA", was launched in the U.S. on July 1, 1994, through a partnership with Rainbow Media. The network was largely a simulcast of the Canadian version with U.S. advertising and acquired programs. The network would go into its own direction over time, eventually rebranding as Fuse in 2003.

Third Much logo used from 1997 to 2011. This logo was first introduced in 1996 before becoming the main logo in 1997. Depending on the show (and maybe the music video), this logo will have different colours.

In 1995, the annual Canadian Music Video Awards were renamed to the "MuchMusic Video Awards" (presently known as the "iHeartRadio MMVAs" as of 2018). Since 1996, the ceremonies have been held outside the formerly named "MuchMusic Headquarters" on 299 Queen Street West, the present-day main offices for Bell Media's speciality channels.

In 2002, MuchMusic introduced promos that consisted of one of twelve images of a VJ posing in front of the network's logo, lasting for only 1/60th of a second each. The "quickies" were recognized with a Guinness World Record for the world's shortest television commercial. Znaimer stepped down from the CHUM board in 2003, although he continued to produce some of Much's programming until the formation of MZ Media in 2007.

=== Under Bell (2006–present) ===
In July 2006, Bell Globemedia (later called CTVglobemedia) announced that it would purchase CHUM for an estimated CA$1.7 billion, including MuchMusic. The sale was subject to CRTC approval and was approved in June 2007, with the transaction completed on June 22, 2007, while the Citytv stations were sold to Rogers Media in the same year. Since then, MuchMusic has aired a vast number of non-music related shows, mainly teen dramas and reality shows.

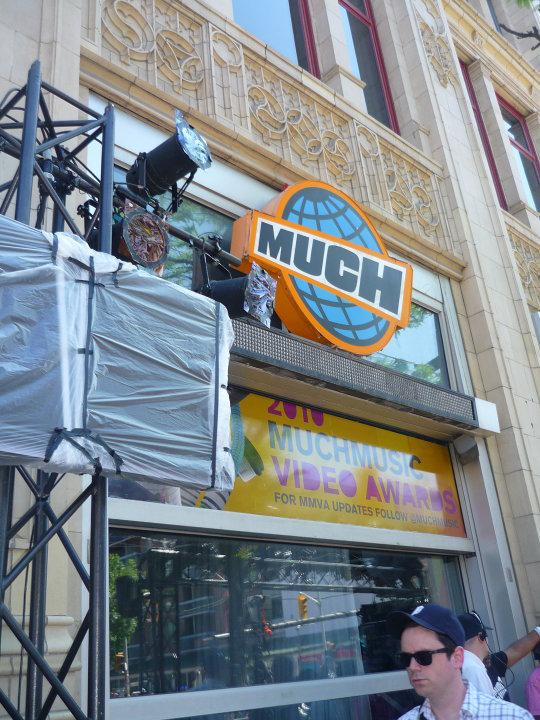
MuchMusic headquarters in 2010

In 2010, the CRTC rejected a request by CTVglobemedia to reduce the percentage of music video programming that the channel shows from 50 to 25 percent. CTV's second request to the CRTC to reduce and reposition its Canadian programming was also denied. For the reasoning behind these requests, CTV explained that "music videos no longer distinguish the service as they are readily available through other sources." This was met with mixed reaction by music fans and drew the ire of notable artists.

First version of Much's current logo, used from April 1, 2011, to September 2013. The black and white print version was used as an alternate logo until 2013.

Much HD logo in 2011

On June 1, 2011, MuchMusic launched its high definition simulcast feed.

Beginning in September 2013, the channel would air more comedy programming targeting young adult men during the late afternoon and primetime hours, much of it moved from The Comedy Network. Such shows included Comedy Central series (such as South Park, Tosh.0 and The Jeselnik Offensive), reruns of The Simpsons and The Cleveland Show, as well as Late Night with Jimmy Fallon and Conan. These changes came when Comedy's request for licence amendments to reduce requirements for Canadian content and increase the amount of animated programming it could air was denied. Around the same time, the channel officially shortened its name to "Much"; while the "Much" shorthand had historically been used as part of its branding, the channel had still used "MuchMusic" as its main branding.

Most of the channel's previous non-music programming, such as Pretty Little Liars and Degrassi, moved to sister channels M3 (formerly MuchMoreMusic and MuchMore) and MTV respectively. At the same time the channel cut back further on original music-related programming apart from Video on Trial, The Wedge, countdowns, and other non-hosted blocks of music videos, with New.Music.Live. confirmed to have been cancelled and the likes of RapCity no longer appearing on Much's schedule. By the summer of 2014, amidst production and staffing cutbacks, the Countdown went on hiatus and Much's remaining original shows, including a revamped Video on Trial, were cancelled.

Meanwhile, in August, Much celebrated its 30th anniversary. A half-hour anniversary special, 30 Years of Much, aired on August 30, 2014; this was preceded by a full-day countdown of The 100 Greatest Videos Ever. Repeats of both the special and the countdown aired throughout the Labour Day weekend. On September 27, 2014, the Countdown returned with a revamped format.

On April 1, 2015, Much announced the launch of Much Digital Studios (later renamed Much Studios), a production unit and YouTube multi-channel network. The network features content catered towards Much's demographic of 12-34s, and would also be integrated into their on-air programming. Such content includes the Mike On Much podcast, hosted by Mike Veerman, co-produced by Arkells lead singer Max Kerman, and featuring segments led by Shane Cunningham. The podcast eventually spawned the spin-off series Much Studios presents "Mike on Much in Conversation With...", which premiered in 2018 on sibling service Crave.

On August 12, 2016, Bell Media sold MuchLoud, MuchRetro, MuchVibe and Juicebox to Stingray Digital. On September 1, 2016, M3 was shut down and replaced by Gusto, which later became CTV Life Channel in 2019, a cooking and lifestyle-oriented TV network that Bell Media acquired, after the original Gusto TV closed in March 2016.

In late 2017, Much further cut back on music programming, reducing its music blocks to the morning hours and removing the Much Countdown from its schedule. MuchFACT was also discontinued, as a result of the CRTC having dropped the requirement for Much to fund it. On October 11, 2017, Much premiered Sides*, a new talk show which discusses youth issues; it was streamed live on Twitter on weekdays, and a weekly highlight show aired on the Much channel. In November 2017, Much began to air a Friday-night block known as Icons, which featured airings of music documentaries.

In 2019, the daytime Playlist block of music videos was discontinued and replaced with library programming, citing decreased interest and viewership. In addition, that year's MMVAs, which were moved to August the previous year, were delayed due to scheduling conflicts with the 2019 MTV Video Music Awards. The Much Retro Lunch block remained the only regularly scheduled music video programming on the channel, with the network citing its popularity among youth as a factor. The block was discontinued on March 20, 2020, and was later replaced by reruns of Corner Gas. The last music video that the channel aired was "Irreplaceable" by Beyoncé.

==== 2021–present ====
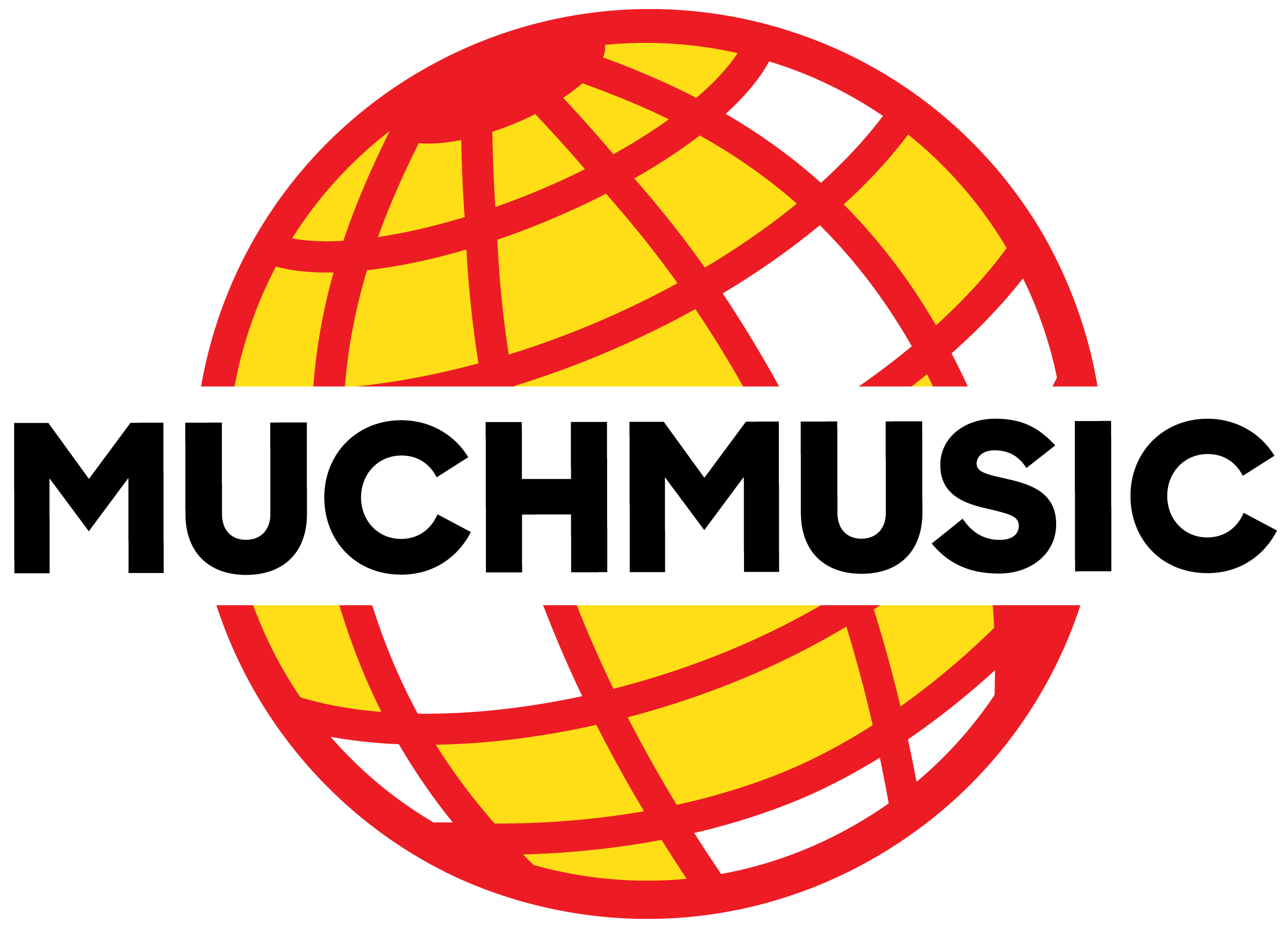
The logo of MuchMusic's digital network, launched in 2021.

On June 10, 2021, it was announced that the "MuchMusic" name would be revived for a new "digital-first" network to launch on July 7 in-partnership with TikTok. The network would feature new "creator-driven content", including revivals of old Much programming. Meanwhile, the linear TV channel would continue with its current format and programming under the "Much" brand.

The channel's early history was chronicled in a 2023 documentary film by Sean Menard, titled 299 Queen Street West. The film premiered at SXSW 2023, and was soon after acquired by Bell Media. The film was scheduled to premiere on January 26, 2024 on Crave, but was indefinitely pulled due to copyright issues involving the music video clips seen in the film.

In October 2024, Canada Post announced commemorative postage stamps honouring MuchMusic and MusiquePlus; the stamps feature a stylized rendition of crowds outside of the networks' headquarters.

== Programming ==
Much's current programming includes acquired comedies, reality shows, broadcasts of feature films, encores of shows seen on sibling networks, and reruns of other shows sourced from Bell Media's program libraries to fulfil Canadian content requirements. From 2013, select Comedy Central originals would be moved to Much from CTV Comedy Channel.

The network's music programming previously consisted of music video blocks seen on weekdays and the annual MuchMusic Video Awards (MMVAs), of which most of its ceremonies had been held outside the network's headquarters on 299 Queen Street West during Father's Day weekend from 2002 to 2017. The network also produced and aired several original series, both in-house productions (such as the MuchMusic Countdown, Video on Trial, and The Wedge) and scripted series (such as The L.A. Complex and seasons 9–13 of Degrassi: The Next Generation, after its move from CTV in 2010).

=== Relationship with MTV ===
Since its inception, Much has aired numerous programs acquired from MTV. Beginning in 1994, MTV's then-parent company Viacom (now as Paramount) would attempt to launch localized versions of the network through other partners; Craig Media, the parent company of the A-Channel stations in Western Canada, first launched MTV Canada and MTV2 Canada as digital cable networks in 2001. Due to CRTC genre protection rules, MTV Canada was forbidden from unduly competing with existing analog channels, such as MuchMusic, and its license henceforth restricted the channel to only devoting 10% of its weekly programming to "music video clips".

CHUM filed a complaint with the CRTC over MTV Canada in early-2002, alleging that 60% of the schedule contained music video programming. CHUM also alleged that the licensing deal with MTV was a "bait and switch" to encroach upon MuchMusic's protected format, rather than deliver the broadly teen-based channel it had promised in the licensing process. Craig disputed the allegations as inaccurate, arguing that CHUM had incorrectly classified any programming "that has some connection to the general topic of music or music videos" (CRTC category 8a, "Music and dance other than music video programs or clips"), as counting as CRTC category 8b "music video clips" programming for the purposes of the complaint, and that it only aired two hours of purely music video-based programming per-day (accounting for 8% of weekly programming). Upon analysis of MTV Canada's programming, the CRTC ruled that music videos played within a category 8a program still counted as music video programming for the purposes of this limit, and found the network in violation of its licence for this and failure to deliver the broadly teen-based service it promised. CHUM would later acquire Craig Media and both MTV-branded channels were re-launched in June 2005; MTV became a youth entertainment channel called Razer, and MTV2 became the interactive all-request channel PunchMuch.

In 2006, Viacom would partner with Bell Globemedia to relaunch TalkTV as a new Canadian incarnation of MTV. The agreement also gave the company rights to air MTV programming on other sibling outlets. The original MTV was relaunched as MTV2 in 2008 before closing in 2024. MTV also closed at the end of 2024, after which airings of its current original series (such as The Challenge, and Jersey Shore: Family Vacation) were added to Much's schedule.

=== Branding history ===
Initially, MuchMusic utilized cel-shaded computer generated graphics in their network IDs, designed by Dana Lee. Additionally, the channel also used scanimate effects using an Amiga computer. At the time, MuchMusic's logo resembled that of MTV's logo at the time. The "i" in "muchmusic" is dotted with a maple leaf (referencing the channel being headquartered in Canada).

Depending on the show (and maybe the music video), the channel's logo's colours would change. In 1993, the channel's logo was revised to have a weird, "M" shape on the MTV-style M. The 1993 symbol was first introduced in the 1992 MuchMusic Video Music Awards. Around 1996, MuchMusic's "planet" logo was created. Sometimes, the logo is seen without the planet; this logo would be adopted full-time on June 23, 1997, replacing the "letter M" logo that the channel had used since its launch in 1984. Over the years, MuchMusic used tons of different logos.

In September 2001, MuchMusic began to use an MTV-style "VHS tape glitch" style in its branding. A new wordmark was also added, being used in tandem with the 1996 logo. An updated look for the channel, no longer featuring the wordmark (and fully utilizing the 1996 logo), was later created on September 15, 2007.

As a response a new, daily 6-7pm block was developed for older audiences, with a much simpler "rectangle" logo (still used today), bolder appearance and reduced "VHS glitch" tactics. Introduced in September 2010, this logo debuted on MuchMusic's advertising media, bumpers and promos. On April 1, 2011, the MuchMusic on air presentation was finalized, as the new look was adopted for the whole channel, with the 1996 logo being retired.

In September 2013, the print version of the 2011 logo was adopted full-time; it featured new colors, and the channel began to use a more "neon signage" look. Variations to the bumpers were reduced and were later replaced by large digital on-screen graphic telling viewers which of the channel's programming is coming up next, and promotions of the channel's programming. In April 2015, the logo was changed aesthetically.

== Affiliated channels ==
With the success of MuchMusic, several spinoff channels have been launched within Canada and around the world, including

=== Former ===
- MusiquePlus: Launched in 1986, it was developed as a Canadian French language version of MuchMusic. In September 2008, new owner Astral Media separated the channel from the network and introduced a new logo. In August 2019, new owner V Media Group relaunched the channel as Elle Fictions with a female-focused programming lineup.
- MusiMax: A sister channel to MusiquePlus focused on adult contemporary music, and was developed as the French language version of MuchMoreMusic. In August 2016, new owner V Media Group rebranded the channel as Max with an entertainment-focused programming lineup.
- PunchMuch: an interactive all-request music video channel, featuring songs and polls voted on by viewers via SMS. On November 17, 2011, PunchMuch was replaced by Juicebox, a new music video channel aimed at pre-teens. Stingray Digital relaunched that channel as Stingray Juicebox in 2016.
- M3: Originally known as MuchMoreMusic, this channel focused on adult contemporary, classic rock, classic hits and even generally lighter music in addition to current pop-rock hits like its sister stations Much and MTV. In March 2009, it was relaunched as MuchMore. In 2013, it rebranded under the M3 name, marketed as an entertainment-focused "superstation" and a separate brand. In September 2016, the channel was relaunched Gusto on all service providers before renaming to CTV Life Channel in 2019.
- MuchLoud: Focuses on rock, modern rock, alternative, punk and metal. In August 2016, new owner Stingray Digital relaunched the channel as Stingray Loud.
- MuchVibe: Focuses on urban music such as hip hop, R&B, and reggae. In August 2016, new owner Stingray Digital relaunched the channel as Stingray Vibe.
- MuchRetro: Focuses on music videos from the 1980s to the early 2000s. Originally known as MuchMoreRetro, a spinoff of what would be known as M3, the channel rebranded on November 1, 2013, aligning itself with the Much brand. In 2016, new owner Stingray Digital relaunched the channel as Stingray Retro.

=== International ===
==== Current ====
- MuchMusic Czech: Launched in 2006, available in the Czech Republic. Unlike its Canadian counterpart, it airs more music programming instead of comedy programming.

==== Past ====
MuchMusic Latin America logo in 2007 until its closure in 2024.

- MuchMusic Latin America: Launched in September 1992, originally available only in Argentina, at the time of its closure distributed on several pay-TV operators in several Latin American countries. it was formerly owned by WarnerMedia Latin America from 2019 until 2022. It was owned by Warner Bros. Discovery Latin America as of April 8, 2022. Unlike its Canadian counterpart, and much like its Czech counterpart, it aired more music programming instead of comedy programming. The channel closed down in Latin America on February 29, 2024, with both Glitz and I.Sat, after which the channel space created in 1992 ceased to exist.
- MuchMusic USA: Launched in 1994. Licence to use MuchMusic name and content revoked, and rebranded as Fuse in 2003. A number of MuchMusic programs were broadcast on this channel in an agreement between the two networks, which share certain programs at times. These included The Wedge, Video on Trial (both Canadian, and a US version) as well as the MuchMusic Video Awards.
- MuchMusic Brasil: Launched in 2000. The channel was aided by its Latin American counterpart and had limited terrestrial coverage during its brief existence. Ceased broadcasting in 2001.
- MuchMusic also had a programming block on MTV3 in Finland called JYRKI.

== Much personalities ==
=== VJs (1984–2014) ===
Several individuals have served as MuchMusic's on-air hosts, or video jockeys ("VJs"). A number of notable Canadian and American television personalities either began their careers at MuchMusic or spent time there. Among these are J.D. Roberts who, under the name John Roberts, is a national correspondent for Fox News; Christopher Ward, a noted songwriter and producer who collaborated musically with Mike Myers on the Austin Powers movies; Sook-Yin Lee, now a noted CBC Radio host and actress; Terry David Mulligan, a prolific film and TV character actor; actress Amanda Walsh; Erica Ehm, who became a noted songwriter after leaving Much; and George Stroumboulopoulos, who became a television personality on CBC, U.S. network CNN and Sportsnet.

==== Former ====
- Steve Anthony
- Matte Babel
- Glen Baxter
- Jeanne Beker
- Laurie Brown
- Rick Campanelli
- Kim Clarke Champniss
- Lance Chilton
- Tim Deegan
- Monika Deol
- Angela Dohrmann
- Denise Donlon
- Phoebe Dykstra
- Ed the Sock
- Tyrone "T-Rex" Edwards
- Erica Ehm (Erica Miechowsky)
- Simon Evans
- Rainbow Sun Francks
- Diego Fuentes
- Dan Gallagher
- Jesse Giddings
- Craig F. Halket
- Jennifer Hollett
- Bradford How
- Mary "Nam" Kiwanuka
- George Lagogianes
- Avi Lewis
- Sook-Yin Lee
- Patrick Lima
- Ziggy Lorenc
- Catherine McClenahan (first female VJ)
- Leah Miller
- Terry David Mulligan
- Nardwuar the Human Serviette
- Rachel Perry
- Juliette Powell
- Nadine Ramkisson
- Natalie Richard
- Daniel Richler
- J.D. Roberts
- Teresa Roncon
- Hannah Simone
- Devon Soltendieck
- George Stroumboulopoulos
- Sarah Taylor
- Lauren Toyota
- Liz Trinnear
- Amanda Walsh
- Christopher Ward
- Matt Wells
- Bill Welychka
- Jana Lynne White
- Chloe Wilde
- Scott Willats
- Michael Williams
- Byron Wong
- Tony "Master T" Young

Some of the former Much VJs have moved onto other opportunities within Bell Media's entertainment brands like etalk and E!, but occasionally return for special Much events like the annual iHeartRadio Video Awards.

==== VJ Search ====
Every few years, when new video jockeys were needed, Much ran a "VJ Search" to pick one new VJ to join the channel. They would usually visit cities across Canada and pick people who appear to show potential through their audition. In earlier years, the VJ Search was usually a two-part show, but in 2006 it evolved into its own reality series called MuchMusic VJ Search. As a result of that series, Tim Deegan was chosen as a VJ. It was followed in 2009 by VJ 2.0, where the winner Liz Trinnear was also picked to join the channel. The final search, Much VJ Search, which Chloe Wilde won in 2013.

=== Much Creators (2015–2021) ===
With the launch of Much Digital Studios in April 2015, Much "Creators" were selected social media personalities, mostly established and emerging Canadian YouTubers. The first ever Fan Fave Much Creator award was won by YouTwoTV during the 2017 iHeartRadio MMVAs. Much Creators was discontinued on July 7, 2021.

==== Former ====
- Mila Victoria
- SickickMusic
- Ron Dias TV
- AllegraLouise
- AmandaRachlee
- Letitia Kiu
- Chelsi Madonna
- SidePonyNation
- Rosette Luve
- Top 5 Unknowns
- Jus Reign
- 4YallEntertainment
- Michael Rizzi
- The Danocracy
- Alayna Joy
- YouTwoTV
- ThatDudeMcFly
- Karli Woods
- Istiana Bestari
- Wahlid Mohammad
- Melissa Merk
- Tasha Leelyn
- Deejdesign
- SneakerTalk
- Jaclyn Forbes
- Candace Leca
- Karina V
- RealisticallySaying
- Zak Longo
- Moving Mind Studio
- Dylan Zhang
- Fateh Doe
- Bongo
- Andrew Quo
- Joey Kidney
- Alex Duckworth
- Naomi Leanage
- Matt O'Brien
- The Baker Twins
- Camille Co
- Bianca Harris
- Tyler Shaw
- Shane Cunningham
- Dan Talevski
- Rayn Magic
- Laurier Lachance

== See also ==
- Countdown (MuchMusic)
- MusiquePlus (now known as Elle Fictions)
- Fromage
