= MTV (Canadian TV channel) =

Defunct Canadian music television channel

- Country: Canada
- Broadcast area: Nationwide
- Headquarters: Toronto, Ontario, Canada

Programming
- Language: English
- Picture format: 1080i HDTV (downscaled to letterboxed 480i to the SDTV feed)

Ownership
- Owner: BCE Inc.
- Parent: Bell Media (Brand Licensing Agreement with Paramount Global)
- Sister channels: Much

History
- Launched: September 1, 2000; 26 years ago
- Closed: December 31, 2024; 22 months ago
- Replaced by: Crave (existing catalog); Paramount+ (most programming); Pluto TV Canada (some channels)
- Former names: TalkTV (2000–2006)

MTV was a Canadian English-language discretionary specialty channel formerly owned by Bell Media subsidiary of BCE Inc. with the name and branding used under a licensing agreement with Paramount Global. Originally devoted to talk, lifestyle, documentary and scripted programming, the channel drifted towards programming sourced from its U.S. counterpart aimed at men ages 12-87 before the channel would wind down in 2024.

The channel launched as Talktv in 2000 by Bell Globemedia, but was not as widely available prior to its relaunch in March 2006. Unlike MTV channels in the United States and elsewhere, the channel was restricted in its ability to carry music programming until 2015, due to conditions in the channel's licence issued by the Canadian Radio-television and Telecommunications Commission (CRTC). Thus, the channel never used the "Music Television" tagline as its international counterparts did prior to 2010. Instead, MuchMusic had been launched in 1984 as the designated Canadian channel dedicated to mainstream music.

As a former Category A service, MTV was required to be carried on the basic service of all digital cable providers across Canada. The channel was typically offered optionally at the discretion of providers.

On October 30, 2024, Bell Media announced that MTV Canada would be discontinued at the end of the year. The channel terminated on December 31, 2024. MTV programs were moved to sister channel Much and carried by Crave, while rival Paramount+ carried a majority of MTV's global programming.

== History ==
=== MTV in Canada before 2005 ===
CHUM Limited launched Canadian music channel MuchMusic in 1984, inspired by the success of MTV in the United States. CRTC genre exclusivity restrictions prevented MTV from either bringing its American channel directly into Canada or launching a homegrown competitor. Instead, MuchMusic would acquire Canadian rights to MTV's programming.

In October 2001, MTV partnered with Craig Media to launch MTV Canada as a digital cable channel. One of the conditions of licence was that a maximum of 10% of the schedule could be devoted to music videos and music programming. In 2003, CHUM filed a complaint with the CRTC alleging that MTV Canada was airing more music videos and music programming than allowed by its licence and had subsequently become competitive with MuchMusic. In Broadcasting Decision 2003-65, the CRTC found that MTV Canada was offering a music-based service rather than a broadly-based teen channel. Furthermore, the Commission found that MTV was broadcasting in excess of 10% music video clips and that MTV was not meeting its commitment to provide educational programming for teens, nor was it providing any programming from independent educational authorities.

Craig was ordered to come into compliance with its broadcasting licence, but after CHUM purchased Craig in 2004, MTV Networks terminated the agreement with Craig as the contract had included a provision to cancel the agreement if there was a change in ownership. MTV Canada was subsequently rebranded as Razer from 2005 to 2008, when the channel was rebranded as MTV2 on August 1.

=== Launch as Talktv ===
2000-2006 logo

Meanwhile, Talktv was licensed by the CRTC to Baton Broadcasting, Inc. in 1996 and was launched on September 1, 2000, and primarily carried repeats of CTV talk shows, as well as a six-hour afternoon/evening program, The Chatroom, which aired every weekday until mid-2002, usually broadcast from the CTV-owned Masonic Temple in Toronto. The program featured future CTV network personalities Seamus O'Regan and Ben Mulroney, as well as Craig Norris (now at CBLA-FM-2 in Kitchener, Ontario) and Jennifer Hollett. In 1999, talktv also acquired the broadcast rights to Pamela Wallin Live, which formerly aired on CBC Newsworld. Upon its move, the program was renamed Pamela Wallin's talktv.

Talktv had been licensed as an analogue channel, allowing cable companies to offer it without requiring a digital converter box, and was one of the last specialty channels to be launched with that status (all specialty channels licensed since 2001 have been specifically limited to digital distribution). However, it was not explicitly required to receive analog carriage either, provided the provider had already launched digital services. Due to this, combined with the channel's late launch and cable systems approaching capacity for analog channels, Talktv was only available on digital programming tiers, aside from a handful of major markets such as Toronto. In 2002, the CRTC had granted the channel the right to charge 7¢ per subscriber when carried on basic cable, whereas it was previously made available to these viewers free of charge; the new charge had been expected to help sustain the channel's live programming.

Due to low ratings, and much more narrow distribution than other specialty channels, The Chatroom was cancelled in 2002, after which talktv became solely a repeat service for CTV network programming and repeated segments of The Chatroom.

=== The return of MTV Canada ===
MTV logo used from 2006 to 2012.

MTV logo used from 2012 to 2021.

On September 28, 2005, CTV and MTV Networks announced that Talktv would be relaunched as a new Canadian incarnation of MTV, while continuing to maintain its licence requirement of "documentary programming" with over 68% Canadian content. In the September 28 press release, CTV claimed to have applied for a Category 2 licence that would feature music videos, along the lines of the former MTV2 Canada (now Juicebox).

CTV already had strong ties with MTV; it was the first broadcast network to air The Osbournes, which aired during prime time, uncensored and subsequently aired Punk'd and Newlyweds: Nick and Jessica. CTV's "exclusive" rights to MTV content meant that CHUM's MuchMusic lost all rights to MTV programming immediately following the announcement. CHUM released a statement saying that they would be intrigued as to how talktv could be morphed into MTV without violating its CRTC broadcasting licence, and filed a complaint with the CRTC. However, the CRTC was unable to take preemptive action based on a press release.

Since MTV uses the same broadcast licence CTV held for talktv, CTV is restricted by the following conditions of licence:

- an emphasis on talk programs
- a minimum of 68% of the daytime programming must be Canadian content
- a minimum of 71% of the prime time programming (6:00 p.m. to 12:00 a.m. Eastern Time) must be Canadian content

Prior to the relaunch, The Globe and Mail reported that the network would "... be quite different from what most people associate with the original American MTV, which has increasingly moved away from music videos toward reality shows and other original programming," placing a heavy emphasis on "talk and lifestyle shows". In a Canadian Press report, it was stated that while there could not be a Canadian version of the music-oriented Total Request Live, other spin-off programs were not out of the question. Canadian versions of MTV Cribs, Diary and Making the Video have already been produced.

Leading up to the launch, CTV aired the specials MTV Unplugged: Alicia Keys in early October 2005, and MTV's New Year of Music on December 31, 2005. In February 2006, MTV began promoting its launch date with a series of ads with the slogan "the drought ends 03.21.06," some of which appeared during various programs across Bell Globemedia's (now Bell Media) television platforms. Talktv's bug began periodically changing into an MTV logo to notify viewers of the coming change. On March 1, 2006, the network identifier on several program guides changed from "talktv" to "MTVCAN," additionally the sole program listed was "MTV is Coming," however this was not an actual program and the talktv schedule continued to air.

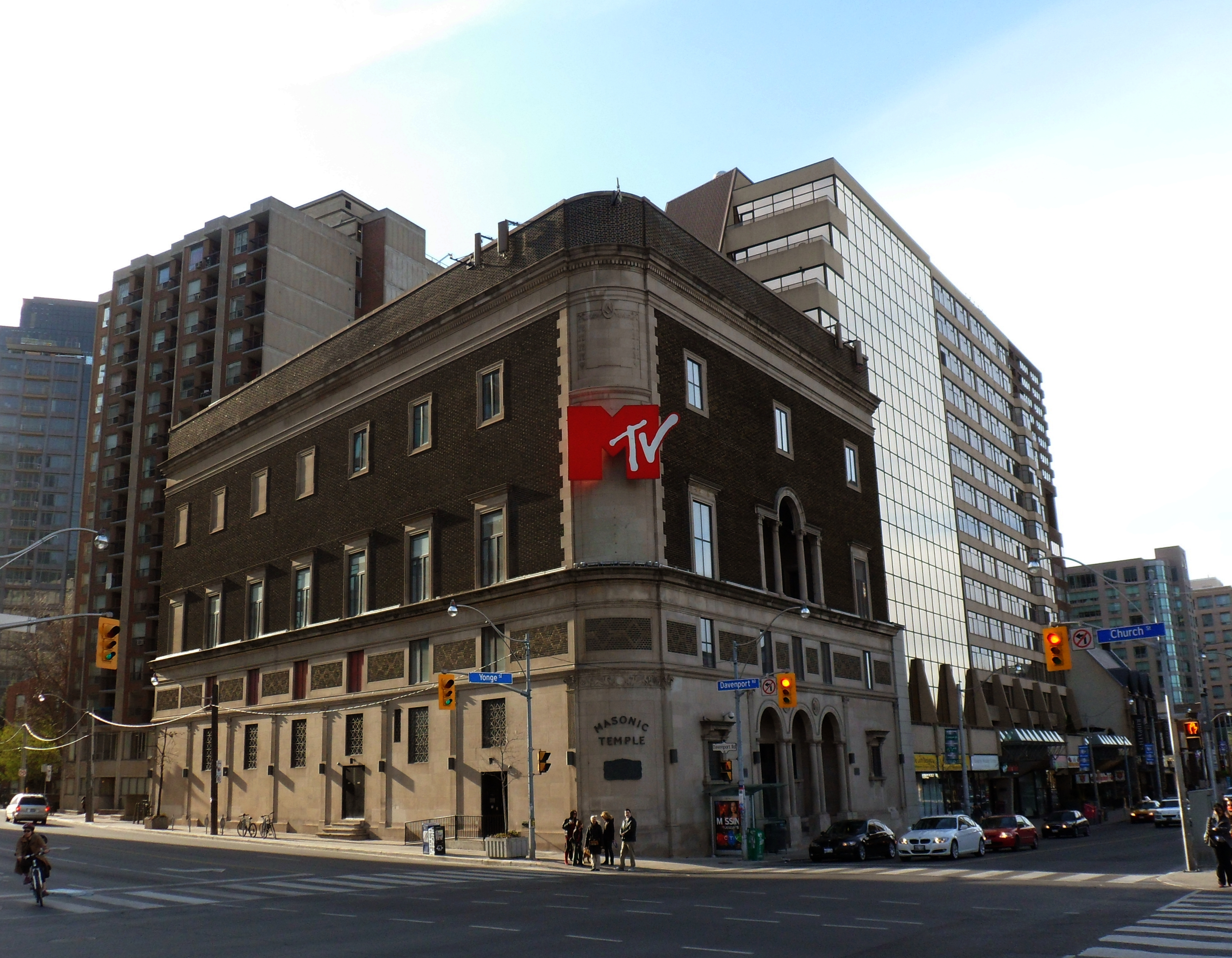
Masonic Temple, the former home of MTV Canada and talktv from 2000 to 2013, seen in 2012.

On February 20, 2006, CTV announced that the Masonic Temple in Toronto – which was previously home to Open Mike with Mike Bullard – would be the new home for MTV Canada and its new flagship show, MTV Live. This would be essentially a revival of the live-and-interactive talk show format introduced by the chatroom, with new hosts, the addition of a studio audience, field reports, and live performances.

The final program broadcast under the talktv brand was that night's episode of eTalk Daily on March 20, 2006 at 11:30 p.m. Eastern Time; this was followed at midnight Eastern Time by a large, red MTV logo and an 18-hour countdown clock in preparation for the relaunch. The relaunch occurred on March 21, 2006, at 6:00 p.m. Eastern Time, with the first edition of MTV Live. The start of MTV Live was preceded (at 5:58:20 p.m. Eastern Time) by a ten-second countdown featuring water drops with "MTV drops" appearing at the end, followed by a 90-second promo featuring various people wearing beige MTV shirts falling out of the sky signifying that the drought was over, as seen in the launch promos. The relaunch as MTV did not affect the channel's analogue status. In fact, many analogue cable viewers that never had access to talktv were able to view the channel at, or soon after, its relaunch. Analogue coverage has been greatly expanded, and many channel placements improved, through new deals with Rogers Cable, Bell TV, Shaw Direct and other cable and satellite providers.

The channel held its official on-air launch party on April 18, 2006, with live performances by Kanye West and Sam Roberts. These performances were edited into several specials that are aired on CTV. On June 27, 2006, MTV Canada aired Making the Video for the first time (Ashlee Simpson's "Invisible"), but only showed a short clip of the video. Viewers were told to watch the rest of the video on the MTV website. Recently, episodes of Making the Video broadcast on the channel have included the full music video.

On November 2, 2012, Bell Media announced that MTV would relocate from the Masonic Temple, which the channel was based from its inception since 2000, to 299 Queen Street West where most of its specialty channels are based, with Bell Media putting the channel's headquarters up for sale on March 4, 2013.

Starting in 2013, the channel would begin airing MTV's scripted programming and the MTV Video Music Awards, alongside new episodes of Degrassi: The Next Generation and its in-house produced aftershow, After Degrassi.

Since the late 2010's, MTV has re-oriented its programming towards male-targeting reality television series, including Jersey Shore and Cops. The majority of its talk, lifestyle, documentary and scripted programming has since been dispersed to other Bell Media channels.

In August 2021, the channel began adopting the current logo being used worldwide. In Quebec, MTV was launched in summer 2024 via the Noovo streaming service.

=== Closure ===
MTV2 (the former iteration of MTV Canada under Craig) ceased operations on March 29, 2024. In an October 31, 2024 report by The Globe and Mail, a Bell Media spokesperson stated that MTV Canada would be shut down on December 31, 2024, with the company citing "changing audiences" as reasoning, and directing viewers to CTV.ca and Crave. Much of its U.S. programs that were aired on this channel are also available on Paramount+ which is also available in Canada. The last show that aired on the channel was an episode of Ridiculousness.

Following the closedown, most current MTV original programming moved to sister channel Much, however other certain programming, such as current seasons of established franchises such as The Challenge and Teen Mom, were picked up by Corus Entertainment's Slice.

== Programming ==
Though still marketed as a talk-based service as of 2024, MTV ended its run by carrying most of the original programming seen on its U.S. counterpart, though the network's scripted programming (Teen Wolf and Awkward., etc.) and the MTV Video Music Awards did not begin airing on the Canadian channel until 2013.

Music-based programming was absent from the channel because the original broadcasting licence issued for Talktv did not allow for any music programming, but its programs were interactive television blended with vintage and traditional talk programming. Moreover, MuchMusic's previous status as Canada's mainstream music channel (and the accompanying genre protection from direct competition) meant that MTV could not have requested a new format enabling it to compete directly with Much in any event. Since mid-2007, Much and its affiliated channels have been under the same ownership, following CTVglobemedia's acquisition of CHUM Limited, making the former rival networks present-day sister channels.

The After Show was developed as a companion talk show for series such as Laguna Beach to comply with channel's quotas for talk programming, featuring discussions relating to the previously-aired episode; The After Show would gain a large audience, was later picked up by the U.S. MTV channel as well, and was considered a precursor for the wider array of aftershows (such as Talking Dead) that emerged among U.S. television series in the 2010s.

In March 2015, the CRTC announced it would no longer enforce conditions of licence related to programming for most specialty channels other than those primarily airing news or sports. By that point, MTV's schedule had begun to emphasize scripted series reruns during the daytime hours, including Canadian-produced shows to fulfill Canadian content quotas. By the late 2010's, MTV had moved most of its scripted programming to Bravo, some of its talk programming to E!, and many of its lifestyle programming to Gusto, entirely sourcing many of its programming from its U.S. counterpart.

=== 10 Spot ===
The "10 Spot" is the channel's hour-long primetime block of MTV reality and lifestyle series airing weeknights at 10:00 p.m. Eastern and Pacific Time. New, as well as returning series premiere on the block on a monthly basis. Branded after the former block on the U.S. channel, the "10 Spot" schedule often resembles that featured on the MTV channel in the United States, although the programs are often aired several weeks behind their initial broadcast in the U.S.

=== Interactivity ===
During afternoon and prime time commercial breaks, MTV hosts direct discussions about the shows that are currently airing on the channel. Viewers are encouraged to interact with MTV and its hosts through emails or telephone. These short interstitials are used as a way of fulfilling the talk programming requirements under the channel's license.

=== MTV on CTV ===
CTV formerly aired a late-night block of MTV programming branded as "MTV on CTV," airing on Saturdays from 12:05 to 2:05 a.m. local time (actual times may vary by location or station). Programming featured in the block includes several of the music-oriented and comedy programs that MTV Canada itself cannot air as well as many of the reality/lifestyle shows that are shown on MTV. A half-hour weeknight block aired at 1:05 a.m. local time from MTV Canada's 2006 relaunch until September 7, 2007, when it was replaced by TMZ on TV.

== MTV.ca ==
At the time of launch in March 2006, the channel's website was branded as MTV Overdrive. This brand was dropped in early 2007, months after MTV U.S. had dropped the Overdrive name for its website, which it began simply calling MTV.com. In June 2007, the site was redesigned, and was once again facelifted in March 2009 to refocus the website on its video content. As of 2024, the channel now directs to the CTV.ca website.

MTV also maintains a Canadian-exclusive web brand called "MTV FORA", which is dedicated to beauty, fashion, and lifestyle content.

== High-definition feed ==
On June 4, 2013, MTV HD was launched as a high definition simulcast of MTV that broadcasts in the 1080i resolution format on Eastlink. The HD feed is also available nationally on Bell Fibe TV and Telus Optik TV, and regionally on Cogeco Cable and Rogers Cable.

== See also ==
- Much (TV channel)
- List of MTV award shows
- History of MTV
- List of MTV channels
  - The previous incarnation of MTV Canada
  - MTV Australia and New Zealand
  - MTV Latin America
  - MTV Europe
- Music industry
