= In Soviet Georgia =

1970s advertising campaign for Dannon (Danone) yogurt in the USA

In Soviet Georgia was the name of a 1970s advertising campaign used by Dannon yogurt in the United States to make the argument that eating the product would make one healthier. The campaign was lucrative for Dannon, allowing it to make profits after years of losses. The campaign ran from October 1976 to 1978 in U.S. television and print advertisements. Unique in that it was the first American TV commercial to be produced in the then Soviet Republic of Georgia (now the independent nation of Georgia), the commercial won numerous advertising plaudits.

== Creation ==
The campaign was penned by the Marsteller advertising agency at the urging of the CEO of Danone's U.S. division at the time, Juan Metzger; he wished to market Dannon yogurt in a more health-conscious direction. The production crew travelled to Abkhazia in July 1976 to film the spots.

In October 1976, the first commercials aired on U.S. television, and the first print advertisements were run in TIME and Newsweek. Similar ad campaigns followed in 1977 and 1978. The commercial entitled Son of Russia won a Clio Award in 1978. It was written by Steve Kasloff and the creative director was Peter Lubalin.

== Television commercials ==
In the commercials, shots of elderly Georgian farmers were interspersed with an off-camera announcer intoning, "In Soviet Georgia, where they eat a lot of yogurt, a lot of people live past 100." Each shot had a caption at the bottom, which would tell the audience the farmer's name and his or her age, which ranged from 95 to 105. One such commercial ended with a shot of an old man eating Dannon yogurt, with a woman who was purported to be his 114-year-old mother looking at him fondly. The announcer said, "89-year old Bagrat Tabaghua... ate two cups. That pleased his mother very much." The actual ages of the farmers shown were disputed afterwards and were never proven by the Dannon company.

== Success of the campaign ==
Advertising periodicals such as Advertising Age, The Chief Executive, and The Wise Marketer cited the commercials as a good example of business strategy. In the case of Advertising Age, they ranked In Soviet Georgia in the Top 50 of the best TV commercials of all time and #89 on the list of the 100 Greatest Advertising Campaigns.

Marketing analysts for The Wise Marketer noted that after the In Soviet Georgia ads, the Dannon company reversed a loss trend and started making profits in 1975, which would not end until the fiscal year 1990, when price hikes for yogurt across the board caused sales to decline.

== Reruns ==
Starting in 1996, the ads were replayed on the classic television channel TV Land, and its offshoot, TV Land Canada.
