= Stingray Retro =

Canadian specialty TV channel

- Country: Canada
- Broadcast area: Canada
- Headquarters: Toronto, Ontario

Programming
- Picture format: 1080i HDTV (downscaled to letterboxed 480i for the SDTV feed)

Ownership
- Owner: Stingray Group
- Sister channels: Stingray Vibe; Stingray Loud; Stingray Juicebox; Stingray Country

History
- Launched: September 4, 2003
- Replaced: Edge TV (most providers and channel slot)
- Former names: MuchMoreRetro (2003–2013); MuchRetro (2013-2016)

Links
- Website: www.stingray.com/consumer/brands/stingray-retro

Stingray Retro is a Canadian English language discretionary specialty channel owned by the Stingray Group. The channel mainly broadcasts music videos from the 1980s to the early 2010s, with some occasional pre-1980s music videos played at times.

This channel was launched on September 4, 2003 as MuchMoreRetro under the ownership of CHUM Limited, the parent company of Citytv and was conceived as spin-off of MuchMoreMusic focusing on retro music. Throughout various ownership changes and rebrandings, this channel was acquired by Stingray and adopted its current name in 2016.

== History ==
In November 2000, CHUM Limited was granted approval from the Canadian Radio-television and Telecommunications Commission (CRTC) to launch a national English language Category 2 specialty television service called MuchMore ClassicVideo, described as "consisting of classic (songs more than five years old) music videos and related programs, including music and pop news or commentaries, interviews, concerts, profiles and specials, as well as music-related feature films and series or programs."

The channel was launched on September 4, 2003 as a commercial-free service under the name MuchMoreRetro, a spin-off of MuchMoreMusic.

In July 2006, Bell Globemedia (later called CTVglobemedia) announced that it would purchase CHUM for an estimated $1.7 billion CAD, including in the sale was MuchMoreRetro. The sale was subject to CRTC approval and was approved in June 2007, with the transaction completed on June 22, 2007 while the Citytv stations were sold to Rogers Media that year.

After the channel's initial launch in 2003, it began to introduce commercials throughout its schedule until August 31, 2009 when the channel, along with the other CTVglobemedia-owned digital music channels, switched back to a commercial-free format, while the analogue cable music channels continue to run commercials during programs to this day.

On September 10, 2010, BCE (a minority shareholder in CTVglobemedia) announced that it planned to acquire 100% interest in CTVglobemedia for a total debt and equity transaction cost of $3.2 billion CAD. The deal which required CRTC approval, was approved on March 7, 2011 and closed on April 1 of that year, on which CTVglobemedia was rebranded Bell Media.

On November 1, 2013, after MuchMore was rebranded as M3 in September of that year, MuchMoreRetro was rebranded as MuchRetro—aligning itself with MuchMusic.

On June 21, 2016, it was announced that Stingray Digital would acquire MuchRetro and its sister networks from Bell Media. The acquisition closed on September 16, 2016 with a plan to rebrand the channel as Stingray Retro. On June 1, 2017, Stingray announced the completion of the rebranding process for all 4 channels (MuchRetro was rebranded Stingray Retro prior to June 1), which included new programming and a national promotional campaign.
