= Kevin Stillmock =

American cable television entrepreneur

Kevin Stillmock is an American cable television entrepreneur. In 1996, at age 19, he became the youngest person ever to found a cable TV specialty channel, the now-defunct Edge TV.

== Biography ==
=== Early career ===
Stillmock began his career while he was still a student at The Education Channel in Towson, Maryland as an intern, where he served as a production assistant. He was credited as segment producer on a number of occasions.

=== The Edge TV Years ===
In 1996, Kevin Stillmock launched Edge TV utilizing Hughes satellite for uplink coverage and a network of over 100 college cable television channels across the United States for distribution.

=== Later career ===
Kevin Stillmock became the Chief Media Strategist for Destiny Channel in 2004 and co-created the Extreme Destiny programming block for that television channel. Destiny Channel no longer broadcasts; much of its programming slate has been merged with a different, larger cable network.

=== Milestones ===
- Pet Projects: A television documentary series that featured Brittany Murphy was one of the first animal-oriented television series that Animal Planet later made famous.
- Academy of Television Arts and Sciences College TV Awards: Under Stillmock's leadership, the Academy's College TV Awards were broadcast on national television for the first time. They were hosted by the now late African-American screenwriter Erich Leon Harris.
- No Doubt: Edge TV was the first national television station to broadcast a music video by the band No Doubt.
