= Stingray Country =

- Country: Canada
- Broadcast area: National
- Headquarters: Toronto, Ontario

Programming
- Picture format: 1080i (HDTV); 480i (SDTV)

Ownership
- Owner: Stingray Group
- Sister channels: Stingray Vibe; Stingray Retro; Stingray Juicebox; Stingray Loud; Stingray Now 4K

History
- Launched: May 13, 2019
- Replaced: Stingray Juicebox (most providers)

Links
- Website: Stingray Country

Stingray Country is a Canadian English language discretionary specialty channel owned by Stingray Group. The channel broadcasts music videos relating to country music.

== History ==
The channel launched on May 13, 2019 on Roku; later launching on January 15, 2020, on Bell-owned television systems including Bell Satellite, Bell Aliant, and Bell Fibe TV, replacing Stingray Juicebox. The channel's launch followed CMT's decision in 2017 to stop playing music videos, leaving no dedicated channel for country music videos to air on Canadian television.

Over a month after its launch on Canadian television service providers, Stingray Group announced its official launch on February 18, 2020, noting it has since increased its coverage by launching on additional providers including Eastlink, Cogeco, Shaw Direct, Telus, Comwave, and Vidéotron.

== Programming ==
Since the channels launch, its programming has exclusively been music video programs, primarily featuring videos released during the 1990s to current day.

Current programs airing on the channel include:

- Country Roundup - mix of country music videos from the 1990s to current day
- Tailgate Party - upbeat country music videos
- Hot Country - current day country music video hits
- Smooth Country - slow tempo and ballad country music videos
- Country Throwback - country music videos from the 1990s to early 2000s
- Stingray Country Hot 20 - country music countdown of current day hits
