= Edge TV =

- Edge TV logo
- Country: Canada
- Broadcast area: National
- Headquarters: Toronto, Ontario

Ownership
- Owner: YTV Canada Inc. (Corus Entertainment)

History
- Launched: September 7, 2001
- Closed: July 15, 2003

Edge TV was a Canadian category 2 digital cable specialty channel dedicated to rock and alternative music owned by Corus Entertainment. The channel was inspired by Corus' own Toronto, Ontario radio station, 102.1 The Edge.

Edge TV featured music videos, interviews, and more related to its music genre. Edge TV was licensed by the CRTC on December 14, 2000. The channel launched on September 7, 2001 and was discontinued on July 15, 2003. Corus Entertainment cited challenges of obtaining sufficient cable and satellite carriage for the channel for reasons to discontinue the service. On the same day of the announcement, Corus announced that it would partner its two rock and alternative radio stations, 102.1 The Edge and Vancouver's 99.3 The Fox, with CHUM Limited's similar music video service MuchLOUD.
