= Allan Waters =

Canadian businessman

Allan Waters (August 11, 1921 – December 3, 2005) was a Canadian businessman and media icon. Waters was one of the founders of CHUM Limited, a Canadian media corporation.

Waters worked as a salesman in a patent medicine company owned by John H.Q. "Jack" Part. In 1954 he and Jerry Grafstein purchased one of Part's other businesses, then money-losing station 1050 CHUM. From this small humble station, Waters built his media empire.

Getting ideas from a visit to Florida, Waters returned to Toronto and introduced the CHUM Chart, CHUM Chicks and CHUM bugs to attract teenage listeners.

Waters expanded from radio into the television market by buying Barrie CBC affiliate CKVR in 1969, four television stations in the Maritimes in 1972 which formed the CTV-affiliated Atlantic Television System (ATV), and then Toronto's fledgling CITY in 1978. Ultimately, by the early 2000's, CHUM would consist of 33 radio stations, 12 television stations and 21 specialty channels, including MuchMusic, Bravo and Space.

Waters stepped down from the board of directors on October 29, 2005. Waters' sons James Waters and Ron Waters served on CHUM Limited's board of directors. His son James (Jim) took over as head of CHUM from the elder Waters.

Waters died on December 3, 2005, at the age of 84.

In June of 2007, CHUM Limited was acquired by CTVglobemedia.
