= Stingray Vibe =

- Country: Canada
- Broadcast area: Canada
- Headquarters: Toronto, Ontario

Programming
- Picture format: 480i (SDTV)

Ownership
- Owner: CHUM Limited (2001–2007); CTVglobemedia (2007–2011) (CTV Limited); Bell Media (2011–2016); Stingray Digital (2016–present)
- Sister channels: Stingray Loud; Stingray Retro; Stingray Juicebox; Stingray Country

History
- Launched: September 7, 2001
- Former names: MuchVibe (2001–2016)

Links
- Website: vibe.stingray.com

Stingray Vibe is a Canadian English language discretionary specialty channel owned by Stingray Digital. The channel broadcasts hip-hop, rap, R&B, rhythmic pop and EDM/Dance music videos.

The channel was launched on September 7, 2001, as MuchVibe by CHUM Limited, the parent company of Citytv and it was a spin-off of MuchMusic based on the television program of the same name.

Through ownership changes, Much Vibe and its sister channels were sold to Stingray Digital in 2016 and adopted its current name that year.

== History ==
In November 2000, CHUM Limited was granted approval by the Canadian Radio-television and Telecommunications Commission (CRTC) to launch a channel named MuchVibe, described as "a national English-language Category 2 music video specialty television service dedicated to Urban music (HipHop, Rap, R&B, Soul and Reggae) and Urban music-related programming."

The channel launched on September 7, 2001 MuchVibe, fashioned after the former MuchMusic original program of the same name. The channel aired primarily music videos with a small selection of other programming including concerts and interviews. Select programs from MuchMusic were aired on a more frequent and longer basis on MuchVibe, including the rap/hip-hop programs Rap City and The DownLo, and the network's eponymous R&B block Vibe.

In July 2006, Bell Globemedia (later called CTVglobemedia) announced that it would purchase CHUM for an estimated $1.7 billion CAD; included in the sale was MuchVibe. The sale was subject to CRTC approval and was approved in June 2007, with the transaction completed on June 22, 2007, with the Citytv stations sold off to Rogers Media that year.

While the channel, from its inception, had always been an ad-supported service, on August 31, 2009, commercial advertising was dropped from the music video portion of the channel's schedule. The only remaining commercials existed in programs such as concerts or other special programming.

On September 10, 2010, BCE (a minority shareholder in CTVglobemedia) announced that it planned to acquire 100% interest in CTVglobemedia for a total debt and equity transaction cost of $3.2 billion CAD. The deal was approved by the CRTC on March 7, 2011 and closed on April 1 of that year, when CTVglobemedia was rebranded Bell Media.

On June 21, 2016, it was announced that Stingray Digital would acquire MuchVibe, MuchLoud, MuchRetro, and Juicebox from Bell Media, at a price-tag later revealed to be $4 million for all 4 channels. The deal for MuchVibe would later close in August 2016 with MuchVibe being rebranded Stingray Vibe on August 12, 2016. On June 1, 2017, Stingray announced the completion of the rebranding process for all 4 channels, which included new programming and a national promotional campaign. With the rebrand, all non-music video programming was removed from the channel.

== Programming ==
=== Current ===
- Club Bangerz
- Daily Video Mix
- Go With the Flow
- Old School Weekend
- Rap @ 11
- Stingray Vibe Top 15

=== Former Programming (as MuchVibe) ===
- The DownLo
- PunchMuch
- RapCity
- Vibe
- Vibe 2 Vibe
- VibeRated
- VintageVibeVideo
