= Shawn Churchill =

Canadian sports journalist

Shawn Churchill is the former sports director for CTV Winnipeg and a sports anchor and reporter for The Sports Network. Churchill has also worked at CKX-TV then moved to A Winnipeg to work as their sports anchor and sports reporter. His career has found him covering multiple Grey Cups, World Curling Championships, Pan Am Games and the Memorial Cup. Churchill graduated from Red River College from their creative communications program.
