= TV Land =

American pay television network

- Logo used since June 23, 2015
- Country: United States
- Broadcast area: National
- Headquarters: One Astor Plaza; New York, New York, U.S.

Programming
- Languages: English; Spanish (via SAP audio track)
- Picture format: 1080i HDTV (downscaled to letterboxed 480i for the SDTV feed)

Ownership
- Owner: Skydance Global Cable Media (Skydance)
- Parent: MTV Entertainment Group
- Sister channels: list of assets owned by Skydance

History
- Launched: April 29, 1996; 30 years ago
- Founder: Nick at Nite
- Former names: Nick at Nite's TV Land (1996–97)

Links
- Website: www.tvland.com

Availability

Streaming media
- Service(s): DirecTV Stream, FuboTV, Hulu + Live TV, Philo, Sling TV, YouTube TV

TV Land is an American pay television network owned by Skydance through its networks division MTV Entertainment Group. It was originally launched as Nick at Nite's TV Land as a spin-off of the Nick at Nite programing block consisting exclusively of classic television shows. The channel now airs a combination of recent and classic television series (ranging from the 1960s to the 2000s), as well as limited theatrically released movies. In the 2010s, the network aired original scripted series. The network is headquartered at One Astor Plaza in New York City. As of November 2023, TV Land is available to approximately 67,000,000 pay television households in the United States; this is down from its 2011 peak of 98,000,000 households.

== History ==
=== Launch and debut ===
On April 29, 1996, the Nick at Nite block simulcasted TV Land's first night starting at 8:00 p.m. Eastern with the episode of Love, American Style which served as the pilot for Happy Days. Nick at Nite's TV Land officially launched at 10pm ET. Following a seven-minute short film introducing the network, the first program TV Land aired was an episode of The Best of The Ed Sullivan Show featuring the Beatles' American debut along with routines by Joan Rivers, Richard Pryor and Señor Wences. The shows led off a launch-day lineup that rebroadcast numerous series premieres, pilot episodes and television firsts.

TV Land's first logo ran from April 29, 1996 to May 2000; the "Nick at Nite's" prefix accompanied it in full-time usage until December 31 of that same year, and was used sparingly thereafter.

TV Land's second logo ran from June 2000 to November 22, 2009. Another version from that point featured a streamlined version with the boxes framing each letter removed and the "TV" letters rendered in Clarendon.

TV Land's third logo ran from November 23, 2009 to May 8, 2012. TV Land also gained a slogan, "Laugh more", two years later in December.

TV Land's fourth logo ran from May 9, 2012 to June 22, 2015. It continued to be used as a secondary logo for the network's daytime classic programming until four years later, with the "Laugh more" tagline removed.

TV Land's fifth and current logo used since June 23, 2015.

The network's original lineup consisted of Hill Street Blues; St. Elsewhere; The Ed Sullivan Show; Gunsmoke; That Girl; The Sonny & Cher Comedy Hour; Honey West; The Addams Family; Love, American Style; Petticoat Junction; Green Acres; The Phil Silvers Show; and Hogan's Heroes.

The channel launched during a time when retransmission consent was becoming more common with subscription networks and terrestrial television stations nationwide as a result of a provision in the 1992 Cable Act. However, MTV Networks offered TV Land to subscription providers for free for its five years of operation if providers would agree to add the channel to their expanded basic tiers during the 1996 calendar year. USSB, then one of two services that used the DirecTV satellite, offered TV Land as a free channel to USSB and DirecTV satellite users, without requiring a subscription, for its first years on air.

Shortly after TV Land's debut, MCA filed a lawsuit against Viacom. Because MCA's original agreement with Paramount Pictures to operate USA Network prohibited either partner from operating other pay-television networks outside the joint venture, Viacom had been in breach of contract ever since the company bought Paramount in 1994, because it had operated MTV Networks (including Nickelodeon, MTV and VH1) since its founding in 1983, and Showtime Networks (owners of Showtime, The Movie Channel and Flix) since it was founded in 1985. MCA claimed that the intention of TV Land was to compete directly with USA, a claim that turned out to be true. Viacom claimed that the matter had already been settled when Sumner Redstone released Frank Biondi from his contract to let him work at MCA. The suit was eventually settled when Viacom agreed to sell its 50% stake in USA Networks to MCA (MCA later became Universal Pictures, formerly just a subsidiary, which eventually merged with NBC and, later, Comcast).

In February 1999, according to Nielsen ratings data, TV Land averaged a 1.0 share during primetime, tying ESPN for tenth place among all pay-television networks. Its siblings, MTV and VH1, tied for 17th and 26th place respectively. Columnist John Dempsey reported in Variety: "That February rating put TV Land into the top 10 for the first time since it began operating, and opened the eyes of the TV industry to the rich vein of golden-oldie TV shows that distributors are mining for an audience of nostalgia buffs and kids who are stumbling across the series for the first time."

=== Original programming efforts and shift to Generation X ===
The network first forayed into original scripted programming in 2010 with the debut of the sitcom Hot in Cleveland (starring established sitcom stars Valerie Bertinelli, Jane Leeves, Wendie Malick and Betty White), which premiered in June 2010 to 4.75 million viewers, a record audience for the channel. (The success of that series led to a spinoff called The Soul Man, which debuted in June 2012.) This was followed by the January 19, 2011, debut of Retired at 35.

In November 2014, amid growing allegations of sexual assault against Bill Cosby, the network removed reruns of The Cosby Show from its lineup and deleted all references of the series from its website. A marathon of The Cosby Show episodes that had been scheduled for Thanksgiving was also canceled. Episodes from the Steve Harvey run of Family Feud were aired instead.

The network began a programming transition in March 2015, when the new Sutton Foster series Younger was launched without either traditional network branding or advertising. After the series finale of Hot in Cleveland, a new logo was unveiled as part of a larger rebranding that saw TV Land shift its focus to Generation X viewers who grew into the network's demographic. New original series Impastor and The Jim Gaffigan Show were unveiled as the network officially announced the rebranding on June 23, 2015. Completing the shift to edgier, single-camera programming, TV Land announced on July 28 that the upcoming fifth season of the multi-camera sitcom The Soul Man would be its last. Less than two weeks later, on August 10, TV Land's last remaining multi-camera sitcom The Exes was canceled as its fourth season was still airing, and the final episode aired on September 16.

In July 2015, TV Land dropped reruns of The Dukes of Hazzard after the removal of the Confederate battle flag from the grounds of the South Carolina State House because the flag is displayed atop the show's car, the General Lee.

2016 saw the debut of the single-camera sitcom Teachers.

Since 2017, Viacom has been reorganizing its media businesses around six flagship brands, including Paramount Pictures, BET, Comedy Central, Nickelodeon, Nick Jr. and MTV. Network president Keith Cox was reassigned to the newly rebranded Paramount Network (the former Spike), and two series originally slated for TV Land—American Woman and Heathers—were reassigned to the channel. The former was canceled after its first season, while the latter eventually aired in a heavily edited and redacted form. Younger was also supposed to move to Paramount Network for its sixth season, but the move was reversed before the newest season launched. The series would eventually move to Paramount+ and Hulu for its final season, with later airings on TV Land.

On August 20, 2019, two TV Land-branded channels, TV Land Drama and TV Land Sitcoms, were launched on Pluto TV, a free streaming service acquired by Viacom in March 2019. The latter channel was a rebrand of the former Pluto TV Sitcoms channel.

== Programming ==
TV Land's programming originally focused on television series from the 1950s to the early 1980s. Such programming continues to air during the daytime hours, while the network's primetime lineup focuses on both recent and contemporary sitcoms originating from the late 1990s. The network held its own annual award show, the TV Land Awards, from 2003 to 2016.

== Canadian version ==
In 2001, Craig Media launched a Category 2 pay-television specialty channel called TV Land Canada through a brand licensing agreement with Viacom (which later acquired a minority ownership stake in the channel months after its launch). On August 2, 2010, TV Land Canada was rebranded as Comedy Gold, reformatting the channel as an offshoot of The Comedy Network. The rebranded channel focuses primarily on sitcoms and sketch-comedy programs from the 1970s to the 1990s. Viacom sold back its stake in the channel to CTVglobemedia (which would later be acquired outright by minority shareholder BCE, Inc. on September 10 of that year to form Bell Media) following the rebrand. The channel was shuttered on September 1, 2019, after its broadcast license was sold to Wow Unlimited Media.

== See also ==
- Antenna TV – an American digital broadcast network owned by the Nexstar Media Group focusing on classic television series and movies from the 1950s to early 1990s.
- Catchy Comedy - an American digital broadcast network owned by Weigel Broadcasting, formerly as Decades focusing on classic TV comedies from the 1950s to 1990s.
- fetv - an American television network owned by Family Broadcasting Corporation focusing on classic television series from the 1950s to 1980s.
- Retro TV – an American digital broadcast network owned by Get After It Media focusing on classic television series from the 1950s to 1980s.
- Rewind TV - a sister network to Antenna TV focusing on TV comedies from the 1980s to early 2000s.
- MeTV – an American television network owned by Weigel Broadcasting focusing on classic television series from the 1950s to 1980s.
- MeTV+ - a sister network to MeTV focusing on more classic television series from the 1950s to 2000s.
- Cozi TV – an American digital broadcast network owned by NBCUniversal airing television programs from various time periods.
