= CKX-TV =

Television station in Brandon, Manitoba (1955–2009)

- Brandon, Manitoba; Canada
- Channels: Analog: 5 (VHF)
- Branding: CKX Television (general); CKX News (newscast)

Programming
- Affiliations: CBC

Ownership
- Owner: CTVglobemedia; (CTV Limited)
- Sister stations: CKY-TV

History
- First air date: January 28, 1955
- Last air date: October 2, 2009
- Call sign meaning: taken from its former sister radio station, CKX

Technical information
- Licensing authority: CRTC
- ERP: 100 kW
- HAAT: 406.9 m (1,335 ft)
- Transmitter coordinates: 49°40′6″N 100°0′41″W
- Translator(s): see § Transmitters

CKX-TV (channel 5) was a television station in Brandon, Manitoba, Canada, which served as a private affiliate of CBC Television. Owned by CTVglobemedia, it was the first privately owned television station in Manitoba. It shared its call letters with its former sister station, CKX-FM, owned by Astral Media (formerly Standard Radio).

CKX-TV shared studios with CKX-FM and CKXA-FM (then known as "101.1 The Farm") on Victoria Avenue in Brandon; CKX-TV's transmitter was located in Oakland, Manitoba (it was later occupied by CKY-DT rebroadcaster CKYB-TV, which Bell Media closed in 2025).

As a private affiliate of the CBC, the station aired most CBC network programming, but also aired some programs from A. Currently, CBC programming is available through CBC's Winnipeg station CBWT, on Westman Cable channel 6, taking up CKX's former slot.

In February 2009, CTV announced that CKX was up for sale as CBC would not continue its affiliation agreement. In July 2009, it was announced that Bluepoint Investment Corporation would buy the station for a dollar. However, Bluepoint pulled out of the sale on October 1, resulting in the station's closing a day later.

== History ==
The station was founded by John Craig and went on the air on January 28, 1955, a day which marked Craig Media's start in television broadcasting.

In February 1959, CKX asked Manitoba Telephone System (MTS) to apply to the CBC to extend their television signals to four additional Manitoba communities; Dauphin, Swan River, The Pas and Flin Flon.

For nearly half a century, the station remained under the ownership of Craig Media.

During the early 1980s when the CRTC had called for applications for a new television station serving southern Manitoba, CKX-TV had raised fears that extending CKND-TVs signal into the Westman area would split the revenue from national advertisers which could cause CKX-TV to operate in the red.

In 2004, Craig Media announced a deal to sell its broadcasting assets to CHUM Limited. The sale was approved by the Canadian Radio-television and Telecommunications Commission (CRTC) on November 19, 2004, and became official on December 1.

CHUM relaunched the original Craig Media A-Channel stations as new affiliates of Citytv on August 2, 2005, at the same time as the existing NewNet stations picked up the "A Channel" name. It generally left CKX's programming alone, though the A-Channel logo was occasionally seen during primetime programming.

On January 15, 2007, master control for CKX-TV was moved back from Portage la Prairie to Brandon.

Ownership changed hands once again on June 22, 2007, as CHUM Limited was sold to CTVglobemedia. Originally, CTVglobemedia wanted to retain CHUM's Citytv system and sell CKX-TV, CHUM's A-Channel stations, and several speciality channels to Rogers Communications. However, this was denied by the CRTC, and CTV was forced to sell the Citytv stations to Rogers instead. Richard Gray was named the head of news for CKX-TV and the A Channel stations. Gray reports directly to the CTVgm corporate group, as opposed to CTV News, to preserve independent news presentation and management. CKX-TV was CTV's first CBC affiliate since selling their CBC stations in Northern Ontario and Saskatchewan to the CBC in 2002.

In early 2009, CBC decided it would not renew CKX's affiliation agreement past its expiration date of August 31, 2009. When CTV offered to sell the station directly to the CBC for a dollar, they refused, saying they could not afford the station's ongoing operational costs, and costs associated with the upcoming digital transition. Because of this, CTV put the station up for sale, saying it would shut it down on August 31 if no buyer was found.

On April 30, 2009, Shaw Communications announced it would purchase CKX, along with two of CTV's A stations (CHWI in Windsor, Ontario and CKNX in Wingham, Ontario) from CTVgm for a dollar each. However, it was reported on June 30 that Shaw had backed out of the deal. Instead, on July 16, CTV announced that Bluepoint Investment Corporation, a new company owned by media veteran Bruce Claassen, would buy CKX for a dollar. The deal was planned to close by December 31, 2009, pending CRTC approval. Bluepoint intended to keep at least some CBC programming, though CKX was still a full CBC affiliate after August 31.

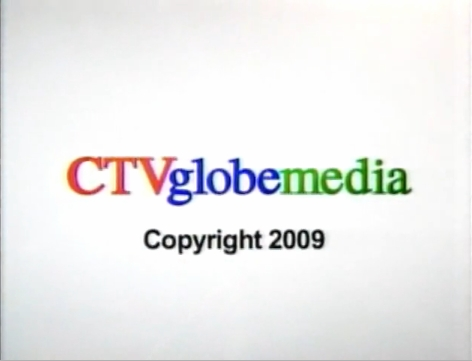
This CTVglobemedia slide was the last message to air on CKX-TV before going off the air on October 2, 2009. A black screen aired on CKX until the transmitters were shut off.

Graphic after CKX's 6 PM newscast on CKX and announcing the closure of CKX-TV, on ckxtv.com, on October 2, 2009.

However, Bluepoint pulled out of the sale on October 1, citing inability to get satellite coverage. As a result, CTV shut the station down the next day, after its 6 p.m. newscast, bringing the station to show a screen thanking viewers for several hours. The last image televised on CKX-TV before going to black was the corporate logo and copyright notice for CTVglobemedia. The station's website, ckxtv.com, also switched to a slate, thanking viewers and directing them to localtvmatters.ca, to learn about CTV's position that local television was being endangered. That website would later redirect to the Bravo Canada website in 2012.

The station was the second major TV station in Canada to have gone dark since 1977 (when CFVO-TV in Hull, Quebec left the air; all other defunct stations in Canada became repeaters of other stations almost seamlessly), the other being CHCA-TV in Red Deer, Alberta, closing about one month before CKX. The station's license was still active after the station's closure, although CHCA's license was revoked in December 2009, and CFVO-TV's license was transferred to Radio-Quebec (now Télé-Québec) as that station later became CIVO-TV. The Access Alberta stations CIAN-DT and CJAL-DT went dark on August 31, 2011. Two months later, it was Quebecor-owned CKXT-TV, which went dark on November 1, 2011.

By the time the CBC closed down its network of rebroadcasters on July 31, 2012, the network never reestablished an over-the-air presence in Brandon.

== Digital television ==
Before its closure in 2009, CKX had not begun broadcasting in digital on its allocated channel 49.

Had the station remained on the air, after the phaseout of analog television in Canada on August 31, 2011, CKX-DT was to remain on channel 49, using virtual channel 5. Following the station's closedown, the allocations for its analog and digital frequencies became open for future stations.

== News ==
CKX aired a one-hour local noon program, The Noon Show, from 12 noon to 1 p.m. daily while it also aired a live one-hour evening newscast, CKX News at 6, from 6 to 7 p.m. every weekday. CKX used to air a late-night half-hour newscast from 11 to 11:30 p.m. until cuts were made to the station in the 1990s and 2000.

Despite its local orientation, CKX news programming generally lagged in the ratings behind Winnipeg-based CTV station CKY-TV, which has a rebroadcaster in Brandon but limited news coverage of the region.

== Notable former on-air staff ==
- Shawn Churchill – former sports anchor
- Darren Dreger – former sports anchor
- Dawna Friesen
- Leah Hextall – former sports anchor
- Don McGowan – talent show host (1957–1958)
- Jill Officer – former reporter

== Transmitters ==
These were CKX's rebroadcasters at the time of its closure.

- CKX-TV-1 11 Foxwarren
- CKX-TV-2 9 Melita
- CKX-TV-3 11 McCreary
