= The Wedge (Canadian TV series) =

The Wedge is a defunct Canadian television series devoted to indie and alternative music, which aired on Canadian music TV station MuchMusic from 1992 to 2014.

The program, which debuted in 1992 as a Monday to Friday half-hour series, was originally hosted by Simon Evans. In 1995, Sook-Yin Lee became the host, and remained with the program until her departure from MuchMusic in 2001. At this time, with alternative rock having undergone a commercial decline, the program was reduced to a weekly airing on Friday evenings. The program had no permanent host for the next decade, serving primarily as a continuous "videoflow", although musicians occasionally appeared as guest hosts of a special episode. By 2010, it had been relegated to airing only at 3 a.m.

On January 26, 2011, The Wedge was re-launched at a new 10 p.m. timeslot. The format was expanded from just music videos to include live performances, interviews, and panel discussions. The show's new host was Damian Abraham, lead singer of the Toronto-based, Polaris Music Prize-winning hardcore punk band Fucked Up.

The program's cancellation was announced in 2014, as part of significant staffing and production cutbacks at Bell Media.
