= MTV2 (Canada) =

Canadian television channel

- MTV2 logo used from 2008 to 2024
- Country: Canada
- Broadcast area: Nationwide
- Headquarters: Toronto, Ontario

Programming
- Language: English
- Picture format: 1080i HDTV

Ownership
- Owner: Craig Media (50%, 2001–2005); Viacom (National Amusements) (50%, 2001–2005); CHUM Limited (2005–2007); CTVglobemedia (2007–2011); BCE Inc. (2011–2024)
- Parent: CTV Limited (2007–2011); Bell Media (2011–2024) (Note: Branding licensed from Paramount Global)
- Sister channels: MTV, Much

History
- Launched: October 18, 2001
- Closed: March 29, 2024 (22 years, 163 days)
- Former names: MTV Canada (2001–2005); Razer (2005–2008)

Links
- Website: MTV2

MTV2 was a Canadian English language discretionary specialty channel focused on general entertainment programming aimed at youth and teen audiences. The channel was owned by Bell Media subsidiary of BCE, Inc., with the MTV2 name and branding used under an agreement with the Paramount Networks Americas division of Paramount Global.

This channel went on the air on October 18, 2001, as MTV Canada by Craig Media and MTV Networks. During its early existence, MTV Canada aired various music videos along with its related music and entertainment programming, which led to CHUM Limited, the parent company of MuchMusic, to file a complaint with the CRTC, accusing MTV Canada of airing more programming that exceeded its licence and being a MuchMusic competitor. However in 2004, CHUM acquired the assets of Craig Media and relaunched the channel in 2005 as Razer as an interactive channel.

While the new Canadian version of MTV was relaunched in 2006 in the space of talkTV, CHUM was acquired by CTVglobemedia in 2007 and relaunched the channel as the second reincarnation of MTV2 in 2008, taking the name of the former MTV2 channel.

The channel closed at midnight on March 29, 2024.

== History ==
=== MTV under Craig Media ===
MTV Canada logo used from 2001 to 2002

Prior to the launch of MTV2 in Canada, the U.S. MTV had already been in Canada since 1981. On November 24, 2000, the Canadian Radio-television and Telecommunications Commission (CRTC) announced the licensees of the new, much-sought after, Category 1 digital services. Craig Media, in partnership with TD Capital Group Ltd, was granted a licence for a youth-oriented service known as "Connect", which would be catered to teens and young adults (but primarily the former) with programming such as "informal education, human interest, sitcoms, animation, and video clips".

Due to genre protection rules prohibiting digital channels from unduly competing with existing analog services (such as MuchMusic), no more than 10% of its weekly programming could be devoted to music videos. Nonetheless, in August 2001, Craig Media announced that it had reached an agreement with MTV Networks to license programming and the MTV brand in Canada for the channel, prompting a pre-launch name change to MTV Canada.

Prior to the channel's launch, Craig purchased TD Capital Group's interest in the channel. The channel launched as MTV Canada on October 18, 2001. Shortly afterward, Craig sold a minority interest in the service to MTV Networks. MTV Canada aired a mix of Canadian-produced programs (including Pepsi Breakout and MTV Select), as well as shows from the U.S. MTV channel (such as TRL and The Real World).

MTV Canada logo used from 2002 to 2005

MuchMusic owner CHUM Limited filed a complaint with the CRTC over MTV Canada, accusing the service of violating its CRTC licence by devoting over 60% of its programming to music videos. CHUM also accused Craig of using its promise of a teen lifestyle service as a backdoor to gain approval for a channel that would encroach on MuchMusic's protected format. Craig disputed the allegations, arguing that music was an aspect of youth culture, and accusing CHUM of having counted any programming "that has some connection to the general topic of music or music videos" as "music video clips".

The CRTC program categories distinguish between music videos and music-related programming that did not involve music videos, but the Commission ruled that music videos contained within music-related programming such as MTV Select and Making the Video contributed towards the program category, and put MTV Canada over the 10% limit.

The Commission also displayed a concern for the service's predominant focus on music programming, as it was at odds with its commitment to deliver a broadly teen-based service as licensed. In particular, the CRTC disputed MTV Canada's compliance with a requirement for 15% of its schedule to be devoted to "informal education/recreation & leisure" programming, as it did not include programming produced by "independent educational authorities", and consisted primarily of generic extreme sports programming and documentaries in overnight timeslots with low viewership and little to do with a curriculum. The CRTC ordered Craig Media to address these shortcomings.

=== Sale to CHUM and relaunch as Razer ===
Razer logo used from 2005 to 2008

CHUM's disputes over the channel were soon rendered moot when it acquired Craig Media in 2004, primarily to gain control of its A-Channel television stations in western Canada (which joined its Citytv brand). However, per a clause in the licensing agreement, Viacom exercised its right to pull out of the venture upon the change in ownership. On June 9, 2005, CHUM announced it would rebrand the channel as Razer, a change that took effect on June 30 of that year. The new channel was built on interactivity, allowing its audience to "program, host and contribute to elements to the service and make it their own". In addition to the new programming slate, Razer debuted RazerTXT, a new programming block where viewers could play a selection of SMS games while watching the shows. Razer would later debut Kamikaze, the branding and programming block used for various anime titles as well as shows such as Happy Tree Friends.

Meanwhile, Bell Globemedia (later CTVglobemedia) struck a licensing agreement with MTV Networks to launch its own MTV channel (previously known as talktv) in early 2006. In July 2006, Bell Globemedia announced that it would purchase CHUM for an estimated CAD$1.7 billion, including its interest in Razer. The sale was approved by the CRTC on June 8, 2007, with the transaction completed on June 22.

=== MTV2 ===
On August 1, 2008, Razer was relaunched as MTV2. Unlike the original channel (now known as Juicebox, the channel aimed at youth), with the vast majority of its programming consisting of music videos, the new channel became much closer in format to its U.S. counterpart. Because of their respective licences, it can air music videos and music programming unlike the current main MTV channel in Canada.

Ownership changed hands again when on September 10, 2010, BCE (a minority shareholder in CTVglobemedia) announced that it planned to acquire 100% interest in CTVglobemedia for a total debt and equity transaction cost of CAD$3.2 billion. The deal was approved by the CRTC on March 7, 2011 and was finalized on April 1 of that year, when CTVglobemedia was rebranded as Bell Media.

In February 2024, Hay Communications and Telus announced on their websites that the channel would be wound down permanently at midnight on March 29, 2024. The channel's licence was revoked to the CRTC on May 6, 2024.

== Programming ==
The network's final schedule as of March 2024 was made up of content produced for other Bell Media channels (including a daily morning block of Comedy Now! to fulfill Canadian content guidelines), along with limited reality programming from the American and UK/Irish versions of MTV, as MTV2 in the United States has had no original programming commissioned for it since 2017. Music videos had already been withdrawn from the schedule by the later part of the decade.

== High-definition feed ==
A high-definition simulcast of the channel was launched on October 16, 2018, and first carried by Shaw Direct.
