= Stingray Loud =

- Stingray Loud logo
- Country: Canada
- Broadcast area: National
- Headquarters: Toronto, Ontario

Programming
- Picture format: 1080i (HDTV) (2017–present); 480i (SDTV) (2001–present)

Ownership
- Owner: CHUM Limited (2001–2006); CTVglobemedia (2006–2011); Bell Media (2011–2016); Stingray Group (2016–present)
- Sister channels: Stingray Vibe; Stingray Retro; Stingray Juicebox; Stingray Naturescape; Stingray Now 4K; Stingray Country

History
- Launched: September 7, 2001
- Former names: MuchLoud (2001–2016)

Links
- Website: Stingray Loud

Stingray Loud is a Canadian English language discretionary specialty channel owned by Stingray Group. The channel broadcasts music videos relating to rock, modern rock, alternative, punk, and heavy metal.

The channel was launched on September 7, 2001 as MuchLoud by CHUM Limited, the parent company of Citytv and it was a rock music spin-off of MuchMusic, based on its former TV series Loud (Power 30), which served as the daily hard rock and metal video show aired on that channel.

Through multiple ownership changes, MuchLoud and its sister channels were sold to Stingray Digital in 2016 and adopted its current name that year.

== History ==
In November 2000, CHUM Limited was granted approval from the Canadian Radio-television and Telecommunications Commission (CRTC) to launch MuchLoud, described as "a national English-language Category 2 music video specialty television service dedicated exclusively to alternative, hard rock, metal and punk music or alternative music-related programming."

The channel was launched on September 7, 2001 as MuchLoud, fashioned after the former MuchMusic original program, Loud. The channel aired primarily music videos with a small selection of other programming including concerts and interviews. Existing MuchMusic rock music video programs were aired on a more frequent & regular basis on MuchLoud, such as The Punk Show, the network's eponymous metal block Loud, and the alternative rock program The Wedge.

In July 2006, Bell Globemedia (later called CTVglobemedia) announced that it would purchase CHUM for an estimated $1.7 billion CAD, included in the sale was MuchLoud. The sale was subject to CRTC approval and was approved in June 2007, with the transaction completed on June 22, 2007.

While the channel, from its inception, had always been an ad-supported service, on August 31, 2009, commercial advertising was dropped from the music video portion of the channel's schedule. The only remaining commercials existed in programs such as concerts or other special programming. Meanwhile, sister stations MuchMusic and MuchMoreMusic would continue to run commercials to this day.

On September 10, 2010, BCE, Inc. (a minority shareholder in CTVglobemedia) announced that it planned to acquire 100% interest in CTVglobemedia for a total debt and equity transaction cost of $3.2 billion CAD. The deal which required CRTC approval, was approved on March 7, 2011 and closed on April 1 of that year, on which CTVglobemedia was rebranded Bell Media.

On June 21, 2016, Stingray Digital Group announced that it would acquire MuchLoud and its sister stations from Bell Media at a price-tag later revealed to be $4 million for all 4 channels. The deal for MuchLoud would later close on August 15, 2016, with MuchLoud rebranded as Stingray Loud on August 12, 2016. On June 1, 2017, Stingray announced the completion of the rebranding process for all 4 channels, which included new programming and a national promotional campaign. With the rebrand, all non-music video programming was removed from the channel.

The channel started running commercials again in later parts of 2019, this time to match Stingray's rock radio stations.

== Programming ==
- 21st Century Rock
- Alt-Rock Classics Weekend
- Big Shiny Rock
- Daily Video Hits
- Forever Loud
- Hair Metal Madness
- Metal at Midnight
- Rock Number Ones
- Stingray Loud Top 15
- Tailgate Rock

=== Former programming (as MuchLoud) ===
- Loud
- LoudTested
- PunchMuch
- The Punk Show
- The Wedge
