= Stingray Juicebox =

Canadian television channel

Coordinates: 43.649701°N 79.390233°W

- Logo used since 2016
- Country: Canada
- Broadcast area: Canada
- Headquarters: Montreal, Quebec

Programming
- Language: English
- Picture format: 1080i HDTV (downscaled to letterboxed 480i for the SDTV feed)

Ownership
- Owner: Craig Media (50%, 2001–2005); Viacom (National Amusements) (50%, 2001–2005); CHUM Limited (2005–2007); CTVglobemedia (2007–2011); BCE Inc. (2011–2016); Stingray Group (2016–present)
- Parent: CTV Limited (2007–2011); Bell Media (2011–2016)
- Sister channels: Stingray Loud; Stingray Vibe; Stingray Retro; Stingray Country

History
- Launched: December 6, 2001
- Former names: MTV2 (2001–2005); PunchMuch (2005–2011); Juicebox (2011–2016)

Links
- Website: Stingray Juicebox

Stingray Juicebox is a Canadian discretionary music specialty channel owned by Stingray Group. It is a commercial-free channel that broadcasts music and music videos aimed towards children and teens.

The channel was first established in 2001 by Craig Media as MTV2; it operated as a licensed version of the U.S. channel of the same name, and acted as a sister to its MTV Canada channel. The service was licensed by the CRTC as part of a planned suite of five channels devoted to specific genres of music videos; MTV2 was the only channel of the suite to launch, which drew the ire of CHUM Limited, the parent company of MuchMusic, to file a complaint with the CRTC, accusing MTV2 Canada of airing more programming much like its sister channel MTV, that exceeded its licence and being a MuchMusic competitor.

After the sale of Craig to CHUM in 2004, the channel was relaunched in 2005 as PunchMuch—an interactive spin-off of MuchMusic featuring music videos voted on by viewers online and via text messaging. In 2011 under Bell Media ownership, the network adopted its current format. In 2016, Juicebox and its sister channels were sold to Stingray Digital.

== History ==
=== MTV2 under Craig Media ===
Logo used from 2000 to 2004

In November 2000, Craig Broadcast Systems Inc. (later known as Craig Media) was granted approval from the Canadian Radio-television and Telecommunications Commission (CRTC) to launch a specialty service called "Music 5" that would consist of five separate music video channels that would each focus on a specific musical genre – dance, pop, urban, R&B and "hot hits".

Before any of the channels had launched, in August 2001, Craig announced that it had reached an agreement with MTV Networks to license the MTV brand in Canada for several their channels. Although it was expected that 3 MTV branded genre-specific music channels would launch, on December 6, 2001, only one channel was launched, the channel devoted to "Pop", as MTV2. Shortly after the launch, MTV Networks acquired a minority interest in the channel, along with sister network MTV Canada. MTV2 was structured as a free-form music video channel that aired music videos from various artists from different genres aimed at teenagers to young adults, in addition to a small number of concert series including the MTV Canada original series, Pepsi Breakout.

MuchMusic owner CHUM Limited would file a complaint with the CRTC over MTV2 Canada, accusing the service of violating its CRTC licence by devoting over 60% of its programming to music videos. CHUM also accused Craig of using its promise of a pop music channel service as a backdoor to gain approval for a channel that would encroach on MuchMusic's protected format. Craig disputed the allegations, and this channel operated similarly to the contemporary hit radio format.

According to CHUM's complaint, Craig operated MTV2 as a general interest music video service, rather than a narrower "pop" channel as it was licensed and it also stated that it must air "less than 95% of music video clips broadcast on the channel" of pop music videos. The CRTC would then order Craig Media to address these shortcomings.

=== CHUM acquisition and relaunch as PunchMuch ===
CHUM's disputes over the channel were soon rendered moot when it acquired the assets of Craig Media in 2004, primarily to gain control of its A-Channel television stations in western Canada (which subsequently joined its Citytv brand). However, per a clause in the licensing agreement, Viacom exercised its right to pull out of the venture upon the change in ownership. On June 9, 2005, CHUM announced it would rebrand the channel on June 30 as PunchMuch, changing the format to an automated music video service that would allow viewers the ability to request music videos and participate in on-screen chat, polling, and other interactive participation with their mobile phone. MTV Canada was rebranded Razer on the same day.

In July 2006, Bell Globemedia (later CTVglobemedia) announced that it would purchase CHUM for an estimated CAD$1.7 billion, including PunchMuch. The sale, also needing approval from the CRTC, was approved on June 8, 2007, with the transaction completed on June 22. After a three-year absence, the MTV2 brand returned in Canada when CTVglobemedia rebranded Razer as MTV2 on August 1, 2008.

From its inception, the channel had operated as an advertiser-supported service; on August 31, 2009, PunchMuch and its sister channels MuchLoud, MuchMoreRetro, and MuchVibe all switched to commercial-free formats, while MuchMusic and MuchMoreMusic would continue to run commercials during programs.

Ownership changed hands once again when on September 10, 2010, Bell Canada (a minority shareholder in CTVglobemedia) announced that it planned to acquire 100% interest in CTVglobemedia for a total debt and equity transaction cost of $3.2 billion CAD. The deal was approved by the CRTC on March 7, 2011, and was finalized on April 1 of that year, on which CTVglobemedia was rebranded Bell Media.

=== Juicebox and Stingray ownership ===
PunchMuch was subsequently rebranded as Juicebox on November 17, 2011, focusing on music videos aimed at children (such as teen pop musicians), with an emphasis on videos aimed at preteen audiences.

On June 21, 2016, it was announced that Stingray Digital would acquire Juicebox and its sister channels from Bell Media; the networks were sold for $4 million. The deal for Juicebox would later close on August 15, 2016, with the channel changing its name to Stingray Juicebox on August 12, 2016.

On June 1, 2017, Stingray announced the completion of the rebranding process for all four music video channels, which included new programming and a national promotional campaign.

Since its launch in 2019, a number of television providers have replaced Juicebox with Stingray Country, although the channel continues to be available on some providers.

== Programming ==
Since its relaunch as Juicebox and sale to Stingray, this channel airs primarily music video and programs aimed at younger children and teenagers. The videos on the channel were approved by a committee consisting of parents and employees, who determine the appropriateness of a specific video for the channel's target audience.

During its run as MTV2, this channel primarily aired music programming along with movies, acquired sitcoms and reality shows, as well as reruns of MTV programming and other shows from its sibling owned networks in the U.S. in pattern with its sister channel, MTV.

== See also ==
- Much (TV channel)
- List of MTV award shows
- History of MTV
- List of MTV channels
  - The second incarnation of MTV2 Canada
  - MTV Rocks
- Music industry
