= YouTwoTV =

YouTube channel

YouTwoTV is a YouTube channel produced by Canadian YouTubers Jaz Saini and Harjit Bhandal. The duo is most prominently known as YouTube personalities and Much Studios creators. Since its 2016 launch, the channel currently has 3.64M subscribers and has a total of 1.7B views.

== Early life ==
Jaz Saini was born in Brampton, Ontario to parents of Indian descent. Saini was raised alongside two older brothers, Varinder and Paul. Her eldest brother, Varinder, died at 26 years old in 2008 due to a car accident; her mother died in 2013 after a long battle with depression. Saini graduated from Brampton Centennial Secondary School in 2009 and continued her studies at Humber College, where she graduated with a diploma in Marketing paired with a certification in Marketing Design Applications.

Harjit Bhandal was born in Brampton, Ontario to parents of Indian descent.

== Career ==
Though Harjit dropped out of high school, he took interest in film production and co-founded his own film production company, Majestic Films. Since co-founding the company, Bhandal has worked on various projects including documentaries and music videos.

The duo have also partnered as brand ambassadors with companies like Bell, Nestle, Coca-Cola, M&M's, Subway, and McDonald's.

== Awards ==
In 2017, YouTwoTV won the first-ever "Fan Fave Much Creator" award at the 2017 iHeartRadio MMVAs. In 2016, the City of Brampton recognized the duo with the "Citizens Awards Arts Acclaim Award".
