= Craig Wireless =

Canadian communications company

Craig Wireless Systems, Ltd. (initially Western Manitoba Broadcasters Ltd., then Craig Broadcast Systems, Inc., & next Craig Media, Inc. before its current branding) is a Canadian company which offers Multichannel Multipoint Distribution Service in Manitoba and British Columbia.

In 2004, the company's media assets (its TV stations & A-Channel TV network) were acquired by CHUM Limited.

== History ==
The company has its roots in Western Manitoba Broadcasters, a company John Craig founded alongside Dr. H.O. McDiarmid, Alexander Boyd, Edmund, Fotheringham, Harold Smith, James Rust and M.W. Kerr in 1948.

In the mid-1940s, Craig had bought radio station CKX-FM from the Manitoba Government Telephone System upon its relinquishment of its two licenses for CKX-TV & CKY-FM.

By 1955, John's son, Stuart Craig, had succeeded his father as President and General Manager of CKX-TV (which brought television to Brandon, Manitoba) & CKX-FM (which followed in 1963). Craig took it upon himself to expand the operations of both CKX stations; those expansion operations resulted in the launch of the broadcast company.

The company was based in Brandon, Manitoba, then later in Calgary, Alberta with Drew Craig, John's grandson & Stuart's son, as its CEO.

In 1991, Western Manitoba Broadcasters changed its name to Craig Broadcast Systems.

Craig Broadcast Systems was the owner of the original A-Channel system; CKX, a CBC affiliate, in Brandon, Manitoba; and three digital television specialty channels: MTV Canada (now MTV2), MTV2 (now Stingray Juicebox), and TV Land Canada (later replaced by Comedy Gold, now decommissioned).

For a time in the 1980s and 1990s, the company also produced a local newscast in Dauphin, Manitoba; however, the company did not operate a full television station in that city, but had a contract with CBC Television to run the newscast as a local insertion on the city's CBWT retransmitter.

Eventually, the company was also operating in the telecommunications industry, offering wireless cable television and high-speed Internet services. The company also operated an American subsidiary in Honolulu, which in early 2003 slashed its staff ahead of merger talks with Oceanic Cable.

In 2003, after securing financing in the area of $145 million ($110 million from Providence Equity Partners & a $35 million line of credit from RBC Capital Markets and BMO Nesbitt Burns), the company reorganized its conventional and specialty television operations, with the conventional TV operations (A-Channel & its stations) under the Craig Media branding, while the specialty television channels were placed within Craig Media under Craig Specialty.

Craig Media was the owner of Toronto 1, a local television station in located in Toronto.

In 2004, the company's TV broadcasting operations (A-Channel & its stations) were acquired by CHUM Limited for CA$265 million ($197.8 million) in cash. CHUM did not acquire the company's telecommunications operations, which remain in operation under the Craig Wireless name, which the company took on after CHUM's acquisition of its television broadcasting assets. Upon the name change, another of John's grandsons, Boyd, took over the company.

== Former assets ==
=== Local stations ===
- A-Channel (now Citytv)
  - CKAL - Calgary, Alberta
  - CKEM - Edmonton, Alberta
  - CHMI - Winnipeg, Manitoba
- CKX - Brandon, Manitoba (ceased operations on October 2, 2009)
- CKXT - Toronto, Ontario (ceased operations as of November 2011)

=== Digital television stations under Craig Specialty ===
- MTV Canada, now MTV2 Canada - originally conceived as "Connect" (youth lifestyle programming)
- MTV2 Canada, now Stingray Juicebox - originally conceived as "Music 5" (a service consisting of 5 separate music video channels: Pop, Dance, Urban, R&B, and "Hot Hits")
- TV Land Canada, replaced by Comedy Gold in 2010 (ceased operations as of September 2019) - originally conceived as "Retro" (classic television programming)

==== Proposed, but never launched ====
- A-Channel News Now (24 hr. news)
- Action Channel (action-oriented programming)
- Jazz & Blues TV
- PATV (Pets & Animals)
- The MET (music and entertainment television dedicated to the presentation and promotion of emerging Canadian artists in the rock genre)
- Stampede (western-themed programming)
- Click TV (programs about the Internet, computers and e-business)
- Style TV (devoted to programming about fashion, design and architecture)
