= A-Channel =

Canadian television system

- Type: Broadcast television system
- Country: Canada
- Broadcast area: Edmonton and Calgary, Alberta; Winnipeg, Manitoba

Ownership
- Owner: Craig Media (1997–2004); CHUM Limited (2004–2005)
- Parent: A-Channel, Inc.
- Key people: Drew Craig

History
- Launched: September 18, 1997
- Closed: August 2, 2005
- Replaced by: Citytv (television stations); CTV 2 (A-Channel branding)
- Former names: The Alberta Channel (proposed)

A-Channel (proposed as The Alberta Channel) was a Canadian television system initially owned by Craig Media from September 1997 to 2004, then by CHUM Limited from 2004 to 2005 through A-Channel, Inc. It consisted of Craig's television stations in Winnipeg, Calgary and Edmonton and was the company's unsuccessful attempt to build a national network.

A-Channel launched on September 18, 1997, in Edmonton (CKEM-TV) and September 20 in Calgary (CKAL-TV); Craig's Winnipeg-market station, MTN in Portage la Prairie, rebranded as A-Channel in 1999. The stations were similar in style to Citytv, with an aggressive, urban, street-level, and younger approach to local news and entertainment, including long morning shows and—in Edmonton—midweek telecasts of Edmonton Oilers hockey. In addition, CHUM Limited, owner of Citytv, provided A-Channel with most of its non-local entertainment programming. A-Channel slowly built an audience in its first several years of operation, settling into third place in prime time news ratings and audience.

Craig attempted to expand beyond, particularly to the Vancouver market, but lost out on multiple occasions to other applicants. In 2002, it successfully obtained a licence for a new Toronto station, Toronto 1. However, Craig lost money in startup costs for the new service; at the same time, it grappled with a five-month-long strike at the Edmonton A-Channel station that saw their local news ratings drop by more than half. In January 2004, Craig Media put itself on the market. CHUM Limited, which had been highly desirous of an entry into the Alberta market for some time, acquired the three A-Channel stations. On August 2, 2005, CHUM folded the stations into the Citytv network. On the same date, the A-Channel name was transferred to the stations collectively referred to as NewNet in Southern Ontario and on Vancouver Island, which are currently operated by Bell Media under the CTV 2 banner. The three original Craig Media A-Channel (now Citytv) stations are now owned by Rogers Sports & Media.

== Hearing process ==
In 1993, The Alberta Channel Inc., a majority-owned company of Craig Broadcast Systems, applied to the Canadian Radio-television and Telecommunications Commission (CRTC) for a television service in the province of Alberta, to be known as The Alberta Channel (or A-Channel, for short). Craig owned two stations in its home province of Manitoba, namely CKX-TV, a CBC Television affiliate in Brandon, and the Manitoba Television Network (MTN) in Portage la Prairie and serving Winnipeg. Craig's application competed with AltaWest Television, a subsidiary of the CanWest Global System. The Alberta Channel promised stations in Calgary and Edmonton as well as repeaters to serve Drumheller, Lethbridge, and Red Deer. The Calgary and Edmonton stations would each offer 20 hours a week of local news plus the same amount of non-news local programming. The AltaWest bid, part of network parent CanWest's bid to turn Global into a third national network, envisioned a main station in Calgary. In the end, the CRTC opted not to award either group a licence, saying that neither proposal "would have added sufficient diversity" to Alberta television and would have harmed the province's existing television broadcasters.

In 1996, CanWest and Craig tried again with plans for new television service in Alberta. The A-Channel stations in Calgary and Edmonton would be autonomous, each employing 139 people; Craig also promised a C$14 million investment in independent television production in Alberta. The newscasts would have a style similar to Citytv in Toronto; U.S. entertainment programming would come from previously untapped sources, such as Fox and UPN.

Both bids drew concern from rural broadcasters, such as RDTV in Red Deer. Edmonton's CITV protested the CanWest bid, believing it would cause "an unbalancing of the Canadian broadcasting system". CITV subleased the Edmonton-market rights to many popular U.S. shows from CanWest and stood to lose much of its highest-rated programming were they to establish a Global station there.

After a hearing in July, the CRTC issued a ruling in favor of A-Channel and against CanWest in November 1996. Unlike two years prior, it found the Alberta television market to be "stronger than the national average". Craig won out because of its promises to air more local programming and schedule more Canadian production in prime time. CanWest appealed to the federal cabinet, having suffered a blow to its ambitions of constructing a third national network. It believed that the smaller Craig, which it called "boutique", was less preferable than a third national choice for Canadians. The cabinet rejected CanWest's appeal in January 1997 and permitted Craig to construct the A-Channel stations, though it endorsed inquiries into a third national TV network, a minor win for the company.

== Construction ==
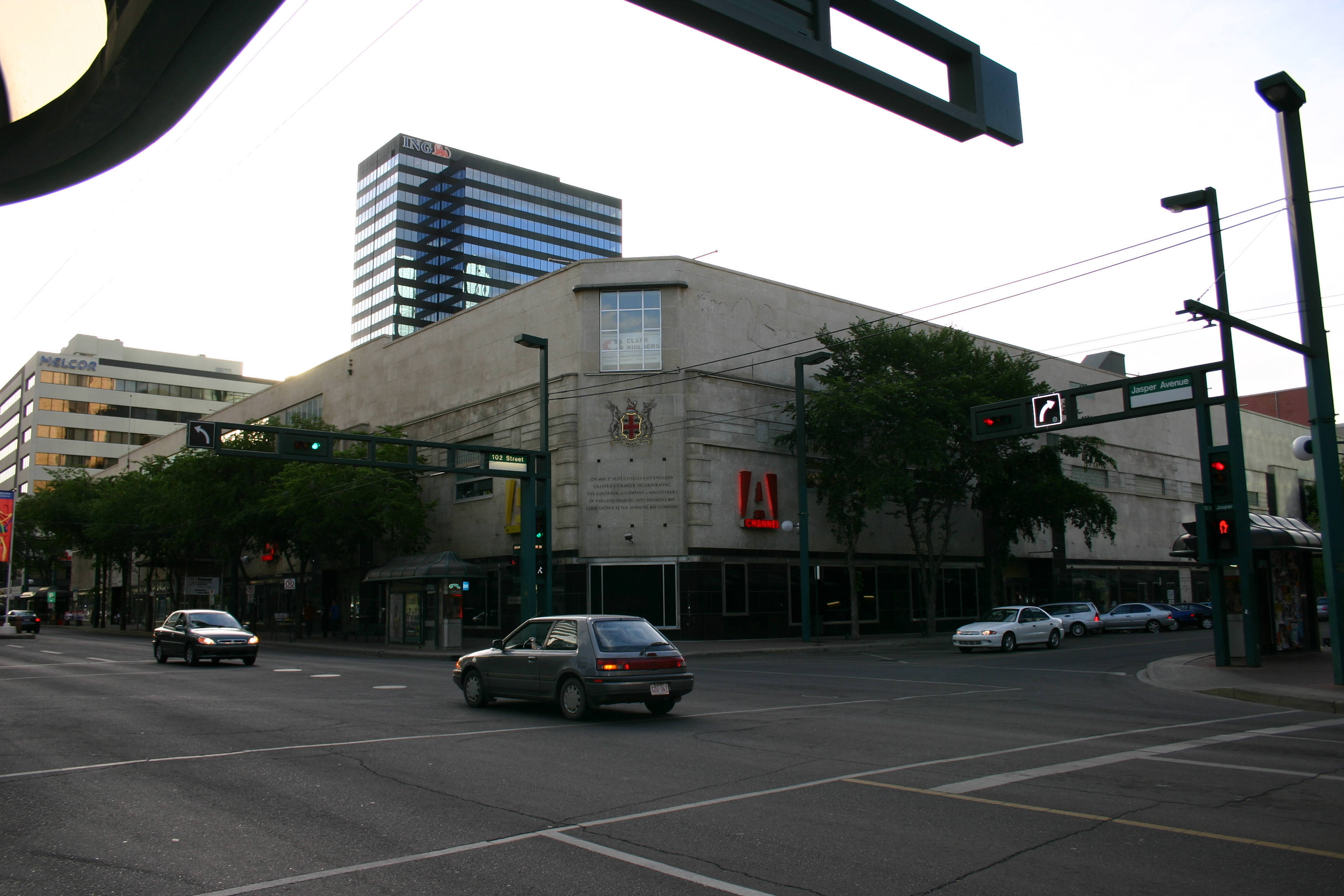
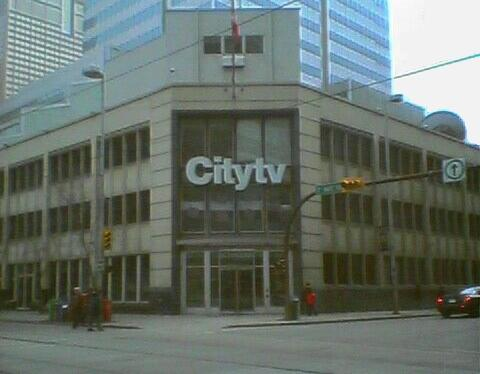
Studios of A-Channel Edmonton in the Hudson's Bay Building (top) and A-Channel Calgary (bottom, seen after switch to Citytv)

With the CanWest bid denied, Craig began constructing the A-Channel stations. In Edmonton, A-Channel set up in the heritage-listed Hudson's Bay building on Jasper Avenue, where it added large windows to its streetside studio; historic preservation conditions complicated work, with new tiles having to be ordered from Quebec. It obtained rights to midweek telecasts of Edmonton Oilers hockey. Most of the on-air talent hired for A-Channel Edmonton came from outside the market, except for Bruce Buchanan, who handled Oilers play-by-play.

The Calgary station at 7th Avenue and 5th Street SW, adjacent to the LRT system, was the only major media outlet in the city to be built in the downtown area. As in Edmonton, much of the on-air talent came from elsewhere in Canada.

In conjunction with winning the licence, Craig established the A-Channel Drama Fund (later the A-Channel Production Fund), which provided financing for made-in-Alberta television movies for air by A-Channel and other outlets. Among these was Ebenezer, a 1998 adaptation of A Christmas Carol starring Jack Palance. The concept of funding independent producers and then obtaining rights to their films was inspired by the UK's Channel 4.

=== Launch ===
A-Channel launched in Edmonton on CKEM-TV (channel 51, cable 7) on September 18, 1997, and in Calgary on CKAL-TV (channel 5, cable 8) on September 20. The new stations were the first in their respective markets since Edmonton's CITV (1974) and Calgary's CBRT (1975). Both stations relied on prime-time movies, a formula Craig had used with some success at MTN in Manitoba. For local programming, they offered a two-hour morning newscast, The Big Breakfast; 6 and 10 p.m. newscasts; and the local programs Live @ Five and Wired, among others.

The new stations had very rough debuts from a technical standpoint. The Calgary station launched four minutes late due to inaccurate clocks; the first 6 p.m. newscast on Monday, dubbed by station staff as "Black Monday", was riddled with errors, leaving anchorman Glen Carter on screen when news footage did not play out. In Edmonton, Jennifer Lyall, the co-host for the local Wired entertainment magazine, quit after just one day on air after not being given time to rehearse. News footage showed on the wrong stories or froze, while sound failed to play out. At one news conference, a local politician saw an A-Channel cameraman enter the room and began mouthing his words without speaking, mimicking the frequently missing audio on the station's newscasts. Many of the issues came down to the tapeless playback and editing system, which had a tendency to delete segments and stories: over five days, the Calgary control room was rewired to bypass it in favor of older, but more reliable, video tape equipment. As part of building A-Channel, Craig agreed to provide some protection to rural broadcasters by delaying the launch of rebroadcasters for one year, and in 1998, the Lethbridge transmitter (rebroadcasting Calgary) opened. The Edmonton station debuted on cable in Red Deer that year, with a rebroadcaster following the next year.

Both stations made respectable debuts after quickly putting their issues behind them. BBM figures for spring 1998 showed A-Channel Calgary in third place in prime time, though its dinner-hour news lagged the CBC. Likewise, A-Channel surpassed the CBC in prime time in Edmonton, but its local programs—outside of hockey—attracted few viewers. BBM found that Live @ Five, the station's 5:00 news program, had just 600 viewers. Over the next two years, the stations became more competitive, with increasing ratings towards their local morning and evening programming.

The A-Channel stations built identities as aggressive outlets appealing to a younger demographic in their local and syndicated programming, similar to Citytv in Toronto. The newscasts reflected this style, with anchors walking around the set and handheld camerawork. In an assessment of the Calgary station in 1999, Gary Davies noted, "It's very rare to attend a media event in this city and not see a representative from A-Channel." All stations had SUVs emblazoned with black-and-yellow paint schemes. A-Channel Calgary had a Hummer as a newsgathering vehicle; when a major snowstorm paralyzed traffic in the city in March 1998, the station responded to a call for assistance by using the Hummer to deliver Meals on Wheels to stranded Calgarians, even ferrying a snowed-in doctor to work.

The Oilers departed A-Channel Edmonton after the 2000–2001 season and consolidated their television games with Sportsnet West, adding 28 games to the latter's existing 20-game inventory. The team was believed to see increased revenue opportunity with a regional telecast. In 2001, A-Channel also moved its late news in Alberta from 10 to 11 p.m., putting it in head-to-head competition with the other Alberta stations and reducing overruns from its movies.

== Expansion beyond Alberta ==
MTN joined the A-Channel system in 1999; Craig built new downtown studios in Winnipeg's The Forks district. The Winnipeg station expanded its news staff by 15 and adopted the trappings of the Calgary and Edmonton stations, including The Big Breakfast.

Craig made proposals for other television properties across the country in the late 1990s and early 2000s. At the same time as its successful A-Channel application, it filed to build a channel titled Very Independent Television in Vancouver and Victoria. That bid failed, and Baton Broadcasting won the channel. In 1999, Craig tried again for a station in Victoria, losing out to the bid's only competitor, CHUM Limited. Craig lost yet again to CHUM when it attempted to acquire CKVU-TV in Vancouver; not only did the deal prevent Craig from moving into the lucrative market, but it also put CHUM firmly above Craig as a media company. Further, CHUM was Craig's primary supplier of programs, at one point accounting for 90 percent of the non-local programming on A-Channel's stations. Matthew Fraser, writing in the National Post, observed that Craig's reliance on CHUM for programs allowed the latter company to either pressure for a sale now or "slowly squeeze" Craig in the long term. In 2002, Craig was successful at the CRTC and won the licence for Toronto 1, a new local station in the nation's largest city. This new service, however, did not follow the programming concept of the A-Channel stations. Compounded with the launch of MTV and MTV2 Canada, this led to strong overlap between Craig and CHUM and intensified the rivalry between the companies. Shortly after, CHUM filed for stations in Edmonton and Calgary.

== A CRTC review and a strike in Edmonton ==
Craig Broadcast Systems asked the CRTC to bring the licence terms of its Alberta and Manitoba stations in line to expire at the same time, leading to A-Channel facing its first licence hearings two years early. CanWest, in a letter, accused Craig of not following through on all of its spending commitments on which it had won the Alberta licences in 1996, stating that it was behind schedule on its production spending and producing less local programming per week than it had promised. Industry officials also sought that further investment in the Production Fund become a condition of licence.

In July 2002, a majority of A-Channel Edmonton employees signed union cards and organized under the Communications, Energy and Paperworkers Union of Canada, which represented employees at Edmonton's other TV stations. Contract negotiations were unsuccessful, with the parties at odds over wages and a promise to not move jobs from Edmonton to Calgary; for the start of the fall television season, on September 17, 2003, workers walked out and began a strike. A-Channel continued airing newscasts because only 10 to 15 employees crossed the picket line, out of 108 total. Picketers made it difficult for employees to get inside the studios and sometimes followed news crews, while the union mounted a pressure campaign to urge national advertisers to cease doing business with A-Channel. Union members rejected a contract offer in December 2003, though about a third of the members had returned to work.

The strike was disastrous for A-Channel's ratings in the Edmonton market. A-Channel News at Six lost more than 60 percent of its viewership and slipped into a tie with the CBC for last place. At the same time, startup costs for Toronto 1 and a series of new digital specialty channels proved to be a drain on Craig's finances. In late January, Craig Media put itself up for sale. Weeks later, on February 14, 2004, strikers overwhelmingly voted to accept a contract offer, recognizing that much work was needed to regain the viewership that A-Channel had lost during the strike.

== CHUM acquisition and folding into Citytv ==
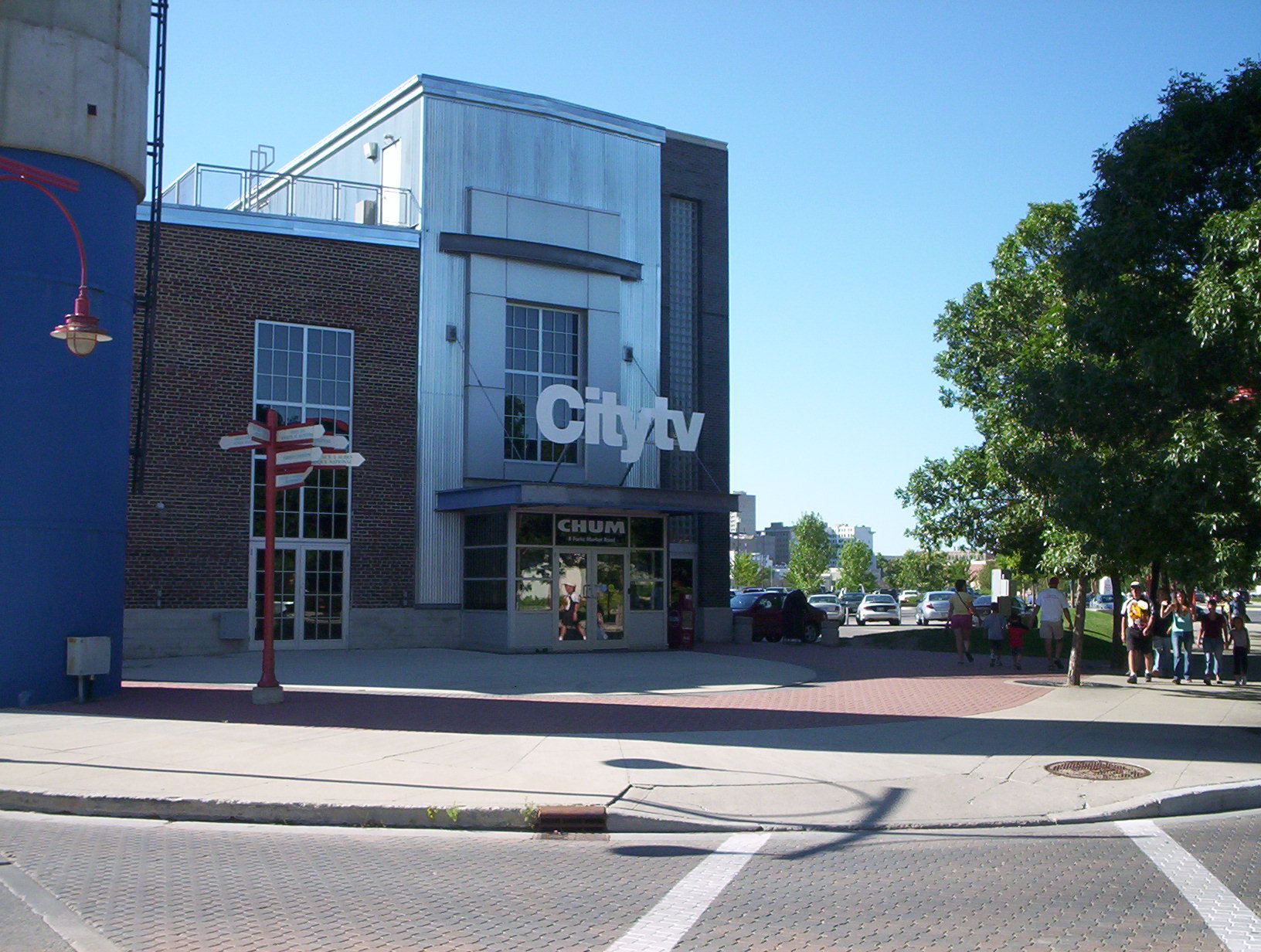
The Citytv studio in Winnipeg in August 2005, after CHMI was rebranded from A-Channel

On April 12, 2004, CHUM Limited announced a deal to purchase Craig Media for $265 million. The move came more than a month after the CRTC denied CHUM's applications for new Calgary and Edmonton stations because the market did not have sufficient advertising revenue to support a new entrant. The sale was approved by the Canadian Radio-television and Telecommunications Commission on November 19, 2004. CHUM had to sell off Toronto 1 because it already owned stations in Toronto (CITY) and nearby Barrie (CKVR); Toronto 1 was sold to Quebecor Media, owners of the media units TVA and Sun Media.

In February 2005, CHUM announced it would align Craig's A-Channel stations with its existing major-market stations under the Citytv name. No other significant changes were made, since the A-Channel stations's on-air look had always been very similar to that of Citytv; they initially retained their local programs, relaunched under Citytv's Breakfast Television morning brand and CityNews news brand. CHUM hoped to lift the ratings of the stations with the new moniker. The change took effect on August 2 of the same year, when the A-Channel name was transferred to CHUM's NewNet stations.

== Programming ==
=== Local programming ===
At launch, the A-Channel stations in Calgary and Edmonton offered a two-hour morning program, known as The Big Breakfast. The anchors were Mark Scholz and Yvette Czigli in Edmonton and Dave Kelly and Robin Gill in Calgary. When MTN became A-Channel in Winnipeg in 1999, it began a local edition of The Big Breakfast helmed by Jon Ljungberg and Jay Onrait. In addition, each station produced local evening newscasts. A-Channel also produced Wired, an entertainment magazine, in Calgary and Edmonton.

The A-Channel stations contributed to The Sharing Circle, a program on First Nations communities which was produced from Manitoba. This program later became independent of the Craig chain when company patriarch Stu Craig sold the rights to host to Lisa Meeches.

=== Entertainment ===
A-Channel generally sourced its American entertainment programming from smaller outlets, including The WB and UPN, which were not widely available on their own in Canada. With the notable exception of the 2002–03 television season, Craig's program acquisition strategy was generally frugal. Canadian series it aired included CityLine, To Serve and Protect, and 1-800-Missing.
