= CHUM Limited =

Canadian media company

Coordinates: 43.649701°N 79.390233°W

- CHUM's last logo before they were defunct and sold to CTVglobemedia in 2007.

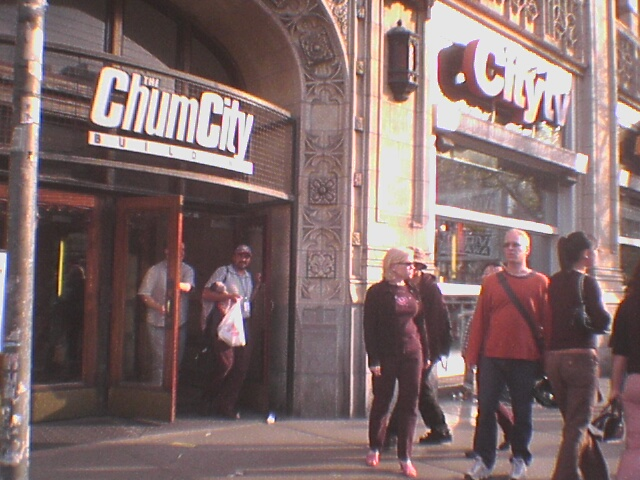
- The CHUM-City building
- Formerly: York Broadcasters Limited (1944–1959); CHUM 1050 Radio Limited (1959–1967); CHUM Limited (1967–2007); CTV Limited (2007–2011)
- Type: Subsidiary
- Industry: Media
- Founded: 1944; 82 years ago
- Defunct: June 22, 2007; 19 years ago (as corporate); April 1, 2011; 15 years ago (CHUM name ceased)
- Fate: Media assets sold to CTVglobemedia in 2007 (subsequently sold to Bell Canada in 2011) with Citytv assets going to Rogers Communications
- Successor: Bell Media
- Headquarters: 299 Queen Street West; Toronto, Ontario M5V 2Z5, Canada
- Area served: Canada, Colombia, Europe, United States
- Key people: Zac Thomson, President and CEO
- Products: Media, Broadcasting
- Parent: Bell Media
- Subsidiaries: Learning Skills and Television Alberta, Limited; CHUM Radio
- Website: www.bellmedia.ca

CHUM Limited was a Canadian media company based in Toronto, Ontario that existed in operation from 1945 to 2011. The company was founded in 1944 as York Broadcasters Limited, launching CHUM-AM 1050 the next year. It was acquired by salesman Allan Waters in 1954. CHUM expanded to and owned 33 radio stations across Canada under its CHUM Radio Network division (now known as iHeartRadio Canada) and also owned other radio stations.

The company also operated full or joint control of 15 local television stations under the ATV, Citytv (acquired in 1981) and A-Channel (formerly NewNet, now CTV 2) brands, one CBC Television affiliate, one provincial educational channel, Atlantic Satellite Network in Atlantic Canada, and 20 branded specialty television channels, most notably MuchMusic and its various spin-offs that were launched under Moses Znaimer, the co-founder of CITY-TV, targeting younger audiences.

In July 2006, one year after the death of Waters, CHUM agreed to merge with CTVglobemedia (now Bell Media), owner of the CTV Television Network. The merger was completed on June 22, 2007; regulatory approval was made conditional on the sale of CHUM's five Citytv stations to Rogers Communications. The company itself was renamed CTV Limited (now CTV Inc.) and continues as a subsidiary of Bell Media. Its Toronto radio stations TSN RADIO 1050 and CHUM 104.5 continue to use "CHUM" as their call signs. The headquarters were located at 299 Queen Street West in Toronto, the famous CHUM-City Building, which currently serves as Bell Media's headquarters.

With the sale of CTVglobemedia to Bell Canada as announced in September 2010, Bell took control of most of CHUM's former assets for the first time. CTVglobemedia was subsequently renamed Bell Media on April 1, 2011, after the deal to purchase the stations was finalized and the CHUM name was completely phased out from its new entity, with the exception of radio stations CHUM-AM and CHUM-FM in Toronto.

== History ==
=== Precursory ===
CHUM Limited began operations when CHUM-AM was founded in 1945 by four Toronto businessmen, including Al Leary, a former sportscaster, who had been the station manager at CKCL for 14 years. CHUM received its licence in late November 1944 to operate a station with 1000 watts. CHUM launched as a dawn-to-dusk radio station under York Broadcasters Limited on 28 October 1945, with John H.Q. "Jack" Part, an entrepreneur in the business of patent medicines, as its president. The station, then operating from studios in the Mutual Street Arena, broadcast a format typical of the late 1940s, with a combination of information, music, and sports. When CHUM was about to debut, Leary told the press that the new station would be known for community service and in-depth news, in addition to live talent and the most popular phonograph records.

Allan Waters, a salesman from Part's patent medicine business took control of CHUM-AM in 1954. Waters' first major move was to secure a licence for 24-hour-a-day broadcasting for CHUM, along with a power increase to 5,000 watts. On April 17, 1959, the name York Broadcasters was changed to CHUM 1050 Radio Ltd.. The CHUM studios were moved from 250 Adelaide Street West to 1331 Yonge Street, Toronto, where their iconic neon sign was erected for the first time. CHUM-FM would begin broadcasting in 1963 under a Classical Music/Fine Arts format. Alex Forbes, whose accounting firm Ewin & Forbes had been CHUM's auditor since 1952, joined CHUM 1050 Radio Ltd. as Secretary-Treasurer. He would play a pivotal role in the company's development.

=== Entering into the television world ===
The company expanded into television holdings for the first time when it gained a one-third interest in CBC affiliate CKVR-TV, a station founded by Ralph Snelgrove (whose first initial and that of his wife, Valerie, form part of the station's callsign), in Barrie. It acquired a second one-third share in 1968, and eventually gained full control in 1970.

On May 12, 1967, under the corporate name CHUM Limited, Allan Waters took the rapidly expanding company public. At the same time, Alex Forbes was appointed to the Board of Directors of CHUM Limited, while it received approval to acquire Ottawa's Radio CFRA Limited and control of two key stations in the market: CFRA-AM and CFMO-FM. CHUM-AM launched the CHUM Christmas Wish, evolving out of The CHUM Kids Crusade, and operating in conjunction with The CHUM Charitable Foundation. This would become an annual event for over forty years under the CHUM-City Christmas Wish, and currently, the CP24 CHUM Christmas Wish.

CITY-TV – the Toronto UHF station launched with great flair and style in 1972 by Moses Znaimer – ran into financial debt by 1975. Multiple Access Ltd. (the owners of CFCF in Montreal) purchased 45% of the station in 1977, and sold its stake to CHUM Limited three years later. CITY was purchased outright by CHUM in 1981 with the sale of Moses Znaimer's interest in the station. In 1987, CITY and the other CHUM-owned television stations moved to the CHUM-City Building at 299 Queen Street West, which became one of the most recognizable landmarks in the city. The CHUM Radio Building at 1331 Yonge Street remained CHUM Limited's corporate headquarters.

=== Specialty additions ===
Between 1984 and 1999, CHUM Limited expanded into many new television holdings such as MuchMusic, Star!, Space, Bravo!, CP24, SexTV: The Channel, Fashion Television Channel, Canadian Learning Television, and many others. In September 1995, CKVR disaffiliated from the CBC after 30 years, and was re-launched as an independent station with a more youthful image in order to generate interest from viewers in the neighbouring Toronto market, where CKVR had long been available on basic cable. This included adopting a news format similar to the CityPulse newscasts on CITY, replacing its various classic TV shows with more contemporary series, and picking up a package of games for the Toronto Raptors, Toronto's then-new NBA franchise. The resulting station became known as The New VR. That same year, the CHUM Radio Network was established to deliver syndicated radio programs across Canada.

The experiment was successful enough that CHUM replicated CKVR's format on several stations it had acquired from Baton Broadcasting in 1997, including CHRO in Pembroke, CFPL in London, CKNX in Wingham, and CHWI in Windsor. Most of these stations were also former CBC affiliates, and all were in markets where CKVR's sister station, CITY-TV, were already available on basic cable. CIVI in Victoria, British Columbia was added into the system by CHUM at its launch in October 2001. A month prior, CHUM bought CKVU from CanWest Global and it became Citytv Vancouver on July 22, 2002. Prior to CHUM's acquisition of CKVU, some Citytv programming was syndicated to KVOS in nearby Bellingham, Washington.

=== Final years ===
Moses Znaimer retired from active management at CHUM in April 2003, and briefly continued to work on projects with the company, before moving on to other ventures such as ZoomerMedia.

On December 1, 2004, CHUM purchased Craig Media Inc., which owned five local TV stations, mainly in the Prairies, and three digital specialty services, for $265 million CAD. While Craig's three largest stations were integrated into Citytv, Craig's Toronto station CKXT-TV (then branded "Toronto 1", now Sun TV) was sold to Quebecor. In addition to its own stations, CHUM was one of several sources (alongside Canwest's CH / E! and Global TV) providing syndicated programming to independently owned CBC and CTV affiliates.

CHUM announced in February 2005 that the NewNet stations would be relaunched under the A-Channel brand by that fall; the rebrand took place on August 2, 2005, the same date when the former A-Channel stations in Winnipeg, Edmonton and Calgary, recently acquired by CHUM from Craig Media, were relaunched under the Citytv brand. At the same time, CHUM announced plans to consolidate the master control departments for CKVR, CFPL, CHRO, CHWI and CKNX at 299 Queen Street West in Toronto, as well as the traffic and programming departments at CFPL, resulting in the loss of approximately nine staff members from CKVR. The switch occurred on June 3, 2005.

Allan Waters stepped down from the CHUM Limited Board of Directors in October and became an honorary director. On December 3, 2005, Waters died in Toronto at the age of 84. Following tributes from across Canada, more than 2,000 attended a celebration of his life at Toronto's Westin Harbour Castle Conference Centre.

=== Sale to CTVglobemedia ===
On July 12, 2006, CHUM announced that it had agreed to a takeover by Bell Globemedia, renamed CTVglobemedia and now Bell Media, (herein abbreviated "CTV" or "CTVgm" for brevity), in a transaction valuing CHUM at $1.7 billion CAD. The takeover required approval from two regulatory bodies, the Competition Bureau, which approved the transaction on March 2, and the Canadian Radio-television and Telecommunications Commission (CRTC), which held a public hearing beginning April 30, 2007 in Gatineau.

CTVgm's takeover bid was completed on October 30, although CHUM was immediately in a blind trust under lawyer John McKellar.

Immediately following the announcement, CHUM separately announced 281 layoffs, primarily at its local stations in western Canada; local newscasts (other than Breakfast Television and the Noon News in Calgary and Edmonton) at all Citytv stations in the region were immediately pulled. CHUM claims the layoffs were part of an ongoing process to streamline its operations and not directly related to the takeover.

On June 8, 2007, the CRTC approved the CTV takeover of CHUM. However, the CRTC made the deal conditional on CTV divesting itself of Citytv rather than A-Channel. This consequently voided the Rogers deal; on June 11, 2007, Rogers announced that it has agreed to buy the Citytv stations. CTV said it would keep all other assets, except CHUM's interest in MusiquePlus/MusiMax, and potentially CKX-TV and CLT.

The sale of the CHUM Limited properties to CTVglobemedia was completed on June 22, 2007 with CTVgm as the sole owner of CHUM. The Citytv stations remained under blind trust awaiting sale to Rogers Media (see below).

Following the takeover less than a month, Richard Gray was named head of news for the A-Channel stations and CKX-TV (another station in the CHUM acquisition). Gray reports directly to the CTVgm corporate group instead of CTV News to preserve independent news presentation and management. Gray now oversees CKVR and the other news departments; CHRO, CFPL, CKNX, CHWI, CIVI and CKX-TV.

=== Additional developments ===
With CHUM Limited dissolved, there were a number of changes. Between 2008 and 2009, Corus Entertainment acquired SexTV: The Channel, CLT, and Drive-In Classics from CTV Ltd. for an estimated worth of $73 million and $40 million each. However, it was announced that CTVglobemedia would be selling CKX-TV in Brandon, Manitoba to Bluepoint Investment Corporation for a dollar. But that station was closed down on October 2, 2009, after Bluepoint rejected the deal the day before. At the same time, they shut down CKNX-TV.

For Citytv, the transaction was worth over $375 million. Media analysts have suggested that with a more powerful media conglomerate such as Rogers behind them the Citytv stations will effectively become Canada's fourth full-fledged commercial television network, in effect if not immediately in name. The Citytv transaction was approved by the CRTC on September 28, 2007, and Rogers officially became Citytv's new owner on October 31. Rogers subsequently purchased 33 Dundas Street East, the former Olympic Spirit building, located at the edge of Dundas Square for the use of its Toronto television stations, and CITY-TV moved out from 299 Queen Street West into the new facility on September 8, 2009. In 2010, CP24 extended their 5:00pm newscast after the announcement regarding their massive firings taking place at Rogers Media's Citytv stations across Canada including the cancellation of Citytv Toronto's CityNews at Five. That same year, Corus relaunched CLT as "Viva", then OWN: Oprah Winfrey Network on March 1, 2011. As well, Star! will be relaunched as E! on November 29, 2010 after CTV announced it had signed a multi-year deal with Comcast. CHUM eventually acquired CFXJ-FM from Milestone Radio that same year since the sale to CTVgm.

As Shaw Communications purchasing the Global Television Network and the Canwest television properties, Vidéotron launching its wireless telephone network with video content as a key selling point, and the enormous popularity of wireless and Internet video and other media streams at the 2010 Vancouver Olympics, Bell once again sought to bring a content provider into its portfolio. It was announced to re-acquire 100% of the company's broadcasting arm in September 2010, including CTV Limited. Under the deal, Woodbridge, Torstar, and Teachers' received $1.3 billion in either cash or equity in BCE, while BCE will also assume $1.7 billion in debt (BCE's existing equity interest is $200 million, for a total transaction value of $3.2 billion). Woodbridge will simultaneously regain majority control of The Globe and Mail, with Bell retaining a 15% interest. The deal is expected to close by mid-2011 pending CRTC approval. CTVglobemedia officially became Bell Media when the deal was finalized on April 1, 2011. At the same time, CHUM Limited / CTV Limited became CTV Inc. (now Bell Media Inc.). and CHUM Radio became Bell Media Radio.

== Corporate governance ==
The last board of directors of CHUM Limited were: Gordon Craig, Denise Donlon, Lawrence Lamb, John Mattenley, Fred Sherratt, Robert Sutherland, Jay Switzer, Catherine Tait, James Waters (chairman), Marjorie Waters, and Ron Waters. Allan Waters retired from the board on October 29, 2005.

== Radio stations at time of sale ==
| City | Call Sign | Frequency | Format |
|---|---|---|---|
| Brockville | CJPT | FM 103.7 | "Bob FM" adult hits |
| | CFJR | FM 104.9 | "JR FM" adult contemporary |
| Calgary | CKCE | FM 101.5 | "Energy FM" hot adult contemporary |
| Edmonton | CHBN | FM 91.7 | "The Bounce" rhythmic top 40 (Co-owned with Milestone Radio) |
| Halifax | CJCH | AM 920 | oldies |
| | CIOO | FM 100.1 | "C100" hot adult contemporary |
| Kingston | CKLC | AM 1380 | oldies |
| | CFLY | FM 98.3 | "FLY-FM" hot adult contemporary |
| Kawartha Lakes | CKLY | FM 91.9 | "Bob FM" adult hits |
| London | CHST | FM 102.3 | "Bob FM" adult hits |
| Montreal | CKGM | AM 990 | "The Team 990" sports |
| Ottawa | CFRA | AM 580 | news/talk |
| | CFGO | AM 1200 | "The Team 1200" sports |
| | CKKL | FM 93.9 | "Bob FM" adult hits |
| | CJMJ | FM 100.3 | "Majic 100" adult contemporary |
| Peterborough | CKPT | AM 1420 | "1420 Memories" oldies |
| | CKQM | FM 105.1 | "Country 105" country music |
| Toronto | CHUM | AM 1050 | oldies |
| | CHUM-FM | FM 104.5 | "CHUM-FM" hot adult contemporary |
| Vancouver | CKST | AM 1040 | "The Team 1040" sports |
| | CFUN | AM 1410 | news/talk |
| | CHQM | FM 103.5 | "QMFM" adult contemporary |
| Victoria | CFAX | AM 1070 | news/talk |
| | CHBE | FM 107.3 | "Kool FM" hot adult contemporary |
| Waterloo | CKKW | AM 1090 | "Oldies 1090" |
| | CFCA | FM 105.3 | "Kool FM" hot adult contemporary |
| Windsor | CKWW | AM 580 | "Motor City Favorites" oldies |
| | CKLW | AM 800 | news/talk |
| | CIMX | FM 88.7 | "89X" modern rock |
| | CIDR | FM 93.9 | "939 The River" adult album alternative |
| Winnipeg | CFRW | AM 1290 | oldies |
| | CHIQ | FM 94.3 | "CURVE 94.3" hot adult contemporary |
| | CFWM | FM 99.9 | "Bob FM" adult hits |

In November, 2004, CHUM and Astral Media filed an application with the Canadian Radio-television and Telecommunications Commission for a subscription radio service in Canada. That application, along with two satellite radio services, were approved by the CRTC on June 16, 2005. While the two satellite services launched soon after the decision, CHUM did not implement its service, the authority for which expired on June 16, 2007 (two years after licensing).

== Television stations ==
=== Local stations ===
| City | Station | Year acquired | Affiliation | Current status |
|---|---|---|---|---|
| Barrie | CKVR | 1969 | CBC / NewNet / A-Channel | Flagship CTV 2 O&O |
| Brandon | CKX | 2004 | CBC | Closed on October 2, 2009 |
| Calgary | CKAL | 2004 | A-Channel / Citytv | Citytv O&O owned by Rogers Media |
| Edmonton | CKEM | 2004 | A-Channel / Citytv | Citytv O&O owned by Rogers Media |
| Halifax | CJCH | 1970 | ATV | CTV O&O |
| London | CFPL | 1997 | NewNet / A-Channel | CTV 2 O&O |
| Moncton/Charlottetown | CKCW | 1972 | ATV | CTV O&O |
| Ottawa/Pembroke | CHRO | 1997 | NewNet / A-Channel | CTV 2 O&O |
| Saint John | CKLT | 1972 | ATV | CTV O&O |
| Sydney | CJCB | 1971 | ATV | CTV O&O |
| Toronto | CITY | 1981 | Citytv | Flagship Citytv O&O owned by Rogers Media |
| Vancouver | CKVU | 2001 | Citytv | Citytv O&O owned by Rogers Media |
| Victoria | CIVI | 2001 | NewNet / A-Channel | CTV 2 O&O |
| Wheatley/Windsor | CHWI | 1997 | NewNet / A-Channel | CTV 2 O&O |
| Wingham | CKNX | 1997 | NewNet / A-Channel | Closed in 2009, now as a repeater of CFPL |
| Winnipeg | CHMI | 2004 | A-Channel / Citytv | Citytv O&O owned by Rogers Media |

==== Other ====
- Edmonton, Alberta – ACCESS (provincially authorized educational broadcaster, now part a CTV 2 station)
- Ottawa, Ontario - CHUM Satellite News (CSN) bureau on Parliament Hill supplying Citytv, A-Channel and NewNet stations with national news coverage 1999-2008

=== Analogue specialty cable channels ===
- MuchMusic
- MuchMoreMusic (known as MuchMore as of 2009, M3 as of 2013; relaunched as Gusto in 2016 and rebranded as CTV Life Channel in 2019)
- Bravo! (now rebranded as CTV Drama Channel, brand name revived in 2024 by Rogers Sports and Media)
- Canadian Learning Television (known as Viva as of 2008, and OWN: Oprah Winfrey Network as of 2011 owned by Corus Entertainment; ceased broadcasting in 2024)
- CP24
- Space (now rebranded as CTV Sci-Fi Channel)
- Star! (now replaced by E!)

=== Digital specialty cable channels ===
- CourtTV Canada (known as Investigation Discovery as of 2010)
- FashionTelevisionChannel (ceased broadcasting in 2021)
- BookTelevision (ceased broadcasting in 2021)
- Drive-In Classics (known as Sundance Channel as of 2010; sold to Corus Entertainment in 2010, ceased broadcasting in 2018)
- MuchLOUD (known as Stingray Loud as of 2016; now owned by Stringray Group)
- MuchMoreRetro (known as Much Retro as of 2013, and Stingray Retro as of 2016; now owned by Stringray Group)
- MuchVibe (known as Stingray Vibe as of 2016; now owned by Stringray)
- PunchMuch (known as Juicebox as of 2011, and Stingray Juicebox as of 2016; now owned by Stringray Group)
- Razer (known as MTV2 as of 2008, ceased broadcasting in 2024)
- SexTV: The Channel (known as W Movies as of 2010, and Cooking Channel as of 2016; now owned by Corus Entertainment, ceased broadcasting in 2024)

==== Co-owned ====
- MusiquePlus 50% (with Astral Media; now owned by Remcorp)
- MusiMax 50% (with Astral Media; now owned by Remcorp)
- TV Land Canada 80% (with Viacom; known as Comedy Gold as of 2010; ceased broadcasting in 2019)

== Television channels using CHUM trademarks or formats at time of sale ==
=== Active ===
- Citytv Bogotá
- MuchMusic Argentina
- MuchMusic Malaysia
- MuchMusic Mexico (programming block on Once TV)

=== Defunct ===
- Citytv Barcelona
- Citytv Puerto Rico
- Star! Scandinavia (programming is a mix of several CHUM channels, such as Star!, FashionTelevisionChannel and MuchMoreMusic)

== See also ==
- List of Canadian television channels
