= Lauren Collins =

Canadian actress (born 1986)

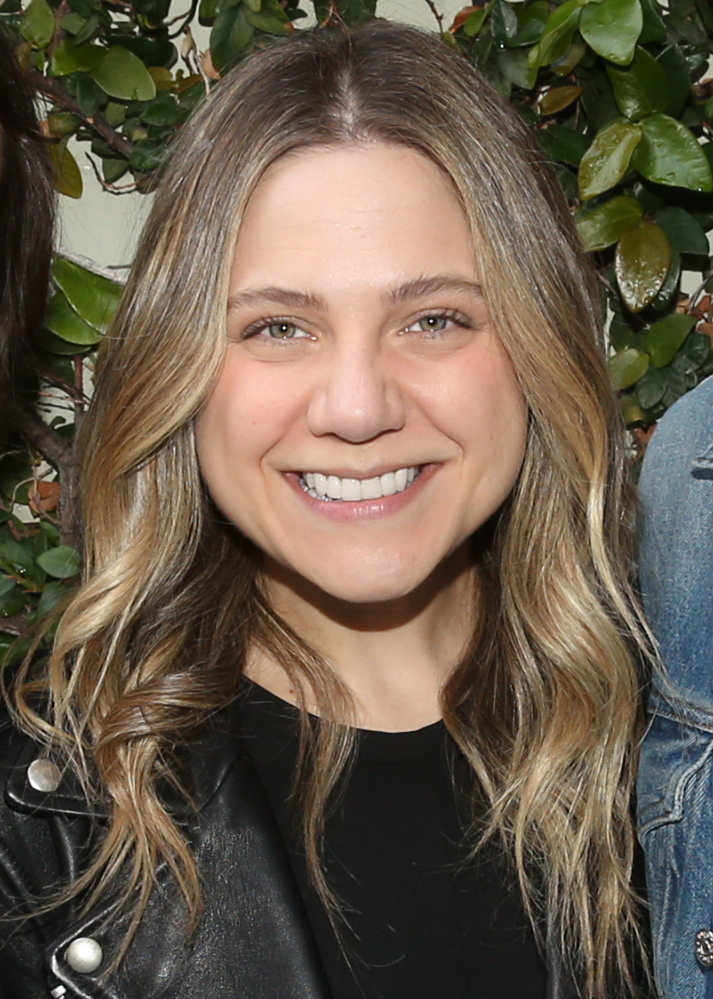
- Collins in 2018
- Born: Lauren Felice Collins; August 29, 1986 (age 40); Thornhill, Ontario, Canada
- Occupation: Actress
- Years active: 1998–present
- Spouse: Jonathan Malen (m. 2018)
- Children: 2

Lauren Felice Collins (born August 29, 1986) is a Canadian actress, best known for portraying Paige Michalchuk on Degrassi: The Next Generation. She has also had supporting roles in the films Take the Lead (2006) and Charlie Bartlett (2007). In 2013, she appeared in multiple episodes of the sketch comedy Kroll Show, as well as a recurring guest role in the fourth season of the FX series The Strain (2017).

== Early life ==
Collins was born in Thornhill, Ontario, the daughter of Sari (née Bresver) and Stan Collins. Her father was born in London, England. Collins was raised Jewish. She has one brother, and her first cousin once-removed is Spencer Rice, one of the stars of Kenny vs Spenny. She is a graduate of Thornlea Secondary School.

== Career ==
Collins first began acting in 1998, with roles in various television series including Once a Thief, Noddy and I Was a Sixth Grade Alien. From 2000 to 2001, she had a recurring role on In a Heartbeat before landing the role of Paige Michalchuk on Degrassi: The Next Generation in 2001. She would stay on Degrassi until her departure in 2008.

She also portrayed Derek's ex-girlfriend Kendra on Life with Derek. She has also appeared in numerous theatrical productions, playing the title roles in Alice in Wonderland and the production of Annie, and starring in the made-for-television film Virtual Mom.

In 2006, Collins made her feature film debut in Take the Lead, appearing alongside Antonio Banderas. The following year she appeared in Charlie Bartlett (starring Anton Yelchin and Robert Downey Jr.). In 2008, she co-starred in the direct-to-DVD feature Picture This, opposite Ashley Tisdale and fellow Degrassi alumnus Shenae Grimes. After YouTube celebrity Shane Dawson expressed his interest in watching the Degrassi series, Collins starred in a parody video released March 6, 2010. She once again worked with Disney Channel and Tisdale on the 2011 High School Musical spin-off feature, Sharpay's Fabulous Adventure, playing the role of Tiffani.

From 2013 to 2014, Collins hosted MTV's 1 Girl 5 Gays replacing Aliya Jasmine Sovani, who had been hosting the show for 4 seasons.

In 2014, she co-wrote and starred in the short film Zero Recognition, directed by Ben Lewis, which premiered at the Toronto International Film Festival. Between 2013 and 2014, Collins appeared in four episodes of the sketch comedy series Kroll Show.

Collins reunited with her former Degrassi co-stars, in 2018, for Drake's "I'm Upset" music video.

In 2023, she was cast as a lead, alongside Megan Follows, in a six-part short-form comedy, My Dead Mom. In 2025, Collins appeared in Guillermo del Toro's Frankenstein, which was released on October 17, 2025.

== Personal life ==
Collins and actor Jonathan Malen became engaged on August 29, 2017. They were married in October 2018. Collins revealed on Instagram that she gave birth to a boy named Charlie Sebastian Malen on March 6, 2020. Their second son, Leo Wilder Malen, was born on April 27, 2023.

== Filmography ==
=== Film ===
Year	Title	Role	Notes
1998	Valentine's Day	Young Alma	Also known as: Protector
2006	Take the Lead	Caitlin	
2007	Charlie Bartlett	Kelly	
2008	Picture This	Alexa	
2011	Servitude	Krissy	
2014	Zero Recognition	Demi	Short film Writer
2015	Farhope Tower	Judy	
2016	Sadie's Last Days on Earth	—N/a	Writer
2017	Apart from Everything	—N/a	Producer
2017	Lolz-ita	—N/a	Short film Producer
2018	NKPC: New Kid Placement Committee	Lilly	Short film
2018	The Christmas Chronicles	Woman at Another Table	
2018	Nose to Tail	Beth	
2019	Run This Town	Sammi	
2020	Serious Lees	Cait	Short film
2025	Frankenstein	Hunter's wife	

=== Television ===
Year	Title	Role	Notes
1998	Real Kids, Real Adventures	Meggie	Episode: "Earthquake: The Hayes Stuppy Story"
1998	Blood on Her Hands	Ruby Collins	Television film
1998	Once a Thief	Cleo at 13	Episode: "Politics of Love"
1998	Tempting Fate	Ruby	Television film
1998	Happy Christmas, Miss King	Libby Hubble	Television film
1998–1999	Noddy	Rox	3 episodes
1999	Rocky Marciano	Mary Anne	Television film
1999	I Was a Sixth Grade Alien	Lindy May	21 episodes
1999	Restless Spirits	Rhonda	Television film
2000	Virtual Mom	Lucy Foster	Television film
2000	Deliberate Intent	Erin Smolla	Television film
2000	Baby	Portia Pinter	Television film
2000–2001	In a Heartbeat	Brooke Lanier	18 episodes
2001	What Girls Learn	Susie	Television film
2001–2008	Degrassi: The Next Generation	Paige Michalchuk	143 episodes
2003	Blue Murder	Shannon Brady	Episode: "Necklace"
2003	Mutant X	Megan Morrison	Episode: "One Step Closer"
2003	Bury the Lead	Sara Chase	Episode: "The RASH Troops of Error"
2004	Renegadepress.com	Amanda	Episode: "Skin Deep"
2005	Totally Spies!	Terra / Gazella	Voice; 2 episodes
2005	Radio Free Roscoe	Blaire	2 episodes
2005–2011	Degrassi: Minis	Paige Michalchuk	18 episodes
2006	Booky Makes Her Mark	Ada-May	Television film
2006	Angela's Eyes	Heather Keene	Episode: "Political Eyes"
2006–2009	Life with Derek	Kendra	10 episodes
2007	Grossology	Naomi	Voice; 2 episodes
2007–2009	The Best Years	Alicia O'Sullivan	8 episodes
2009	Degrassi Goes Hollywood	Paige Michalchuk	Television film
2009	Willa's Wild Life	Sara	Voice; Episode: "Happy Willa's Dad's Day / Willa's Wild Pony Tale"
2009–2011	Being Erica	Young Barbera Strange	3 episodes
2011	She's the Mayor	TV Receptionist	Episode: "Proclamation"
2011	Sharpay's Fabulous Adventure	Tiffani	Disney Channel Original Movie
2013	Long Story, Short	Lucy	8 episodes
2013	Murdoch Mysteries: Nightmare on Queen Street	Rebecca	Miniseries
2013–2014	1 Girl 5 Gays	Herself / Host	27 episodes
2013–2014	Kroll Show	Collette / Mary Belle Edwards	4 episodes
2013–2015	The Day My Butt Went Psycho!	Paige the Cheerleader	Voice
2016	Slasher	EMT	Episode: "In the Pride of His Face"
2016	Degrassi: Next Class	Paige Michalchuck	Episode: "#ThrowBackThursday"
2017	Conviction	Lucy Bates	Episode: "Not Okay"
2017	The Strain	Sophie	4 episodes
2018	Killer High	Carrie	Television film
2018	The Rick Mercer Report	Daughter	1 episode
2018–2019	Impulse	Meghan Lingerman	4 episodes
2019	The Hot Zone	Rebecca	2 episodes
2021	Sex/Life	Mrs. Brenda	2 episodes
2021	What We Do in the Shadows	Meg	Episode: "The Cloak of Duplication"
2021	Hudson & Rex	Olive Chambers	Episode: "Leader of the Pack"
2021	Canadian Reflections	Cait	TV series short Episode: "Serious Lees"
2023	Pretty Hard Cases	Yolanda Pesci	2 episodes
2023	Slip	Rose	
2024	My Dead Mom	Emmy	Web series

=== Music videos ===
Year	Title	Director	Artist
2018	"I'm Upset"	Karena Evans	Drake

== Awards and nominations ==
Year	Award	Category	Title of work	Result
2002	Young Artist Award	Best Ensemble in a TV Series (Comedy or Drama)	Degrassi: The Next Generation (Shared with cast)	Won
2003	Young Artist Award	Best Ensemble in a TV Series (Comedy or Drama)	Degrassi: The Next Generation (Shared with cast)	Nominated
2004	Gemini Award	Best Performance in a Children's or Youth Program or Series	Renegadepress.com (Episode "Skin Deep")	Nominated
2006	Young Artist Award	Best Ensemble in a TV Series (Comedy or Drama)	Degrassi: The Next Generation (Shared with cast)	Nominated
2008	Gemini Award	Best Performance in a Children's or Youth Program or Series	Degrassi: The Next Generation (Episode "Talking in Your Sleep")	Nominated
