= Mighty Planes =

- Genre: Documentary
- Created by: Discovery Channel
- Narrated by: Mike Goral (2012-2017); Jamie Carr (III) (2017)
- Music by: Greg Johnston
- Country of origin: Canada
- Original language: English
- No. of seasons: 4
- No. of episodes: 24 (1 Special)

Production
- Running time: 45 minutes

Original release
- Network: Discovery Channel Canada
- Release: February 26, 2012 – November 5, 2017

Mighty Planes is a documentary television program produced by and aired on Discovery Channel Canada and also broadcast around the world. Similarly to its sister series Mighty Ships, each episode follows a particular aircraft and provides an insight into what it does.

Mighty Planes is part of Discovery Channel's Mighty series. These include Mighty Ships, Mighty Cruise Ships, Mighty Trains and The Mightiest.

The series has aired 4 seasons with 25 episodes in total.

== Series overview ==
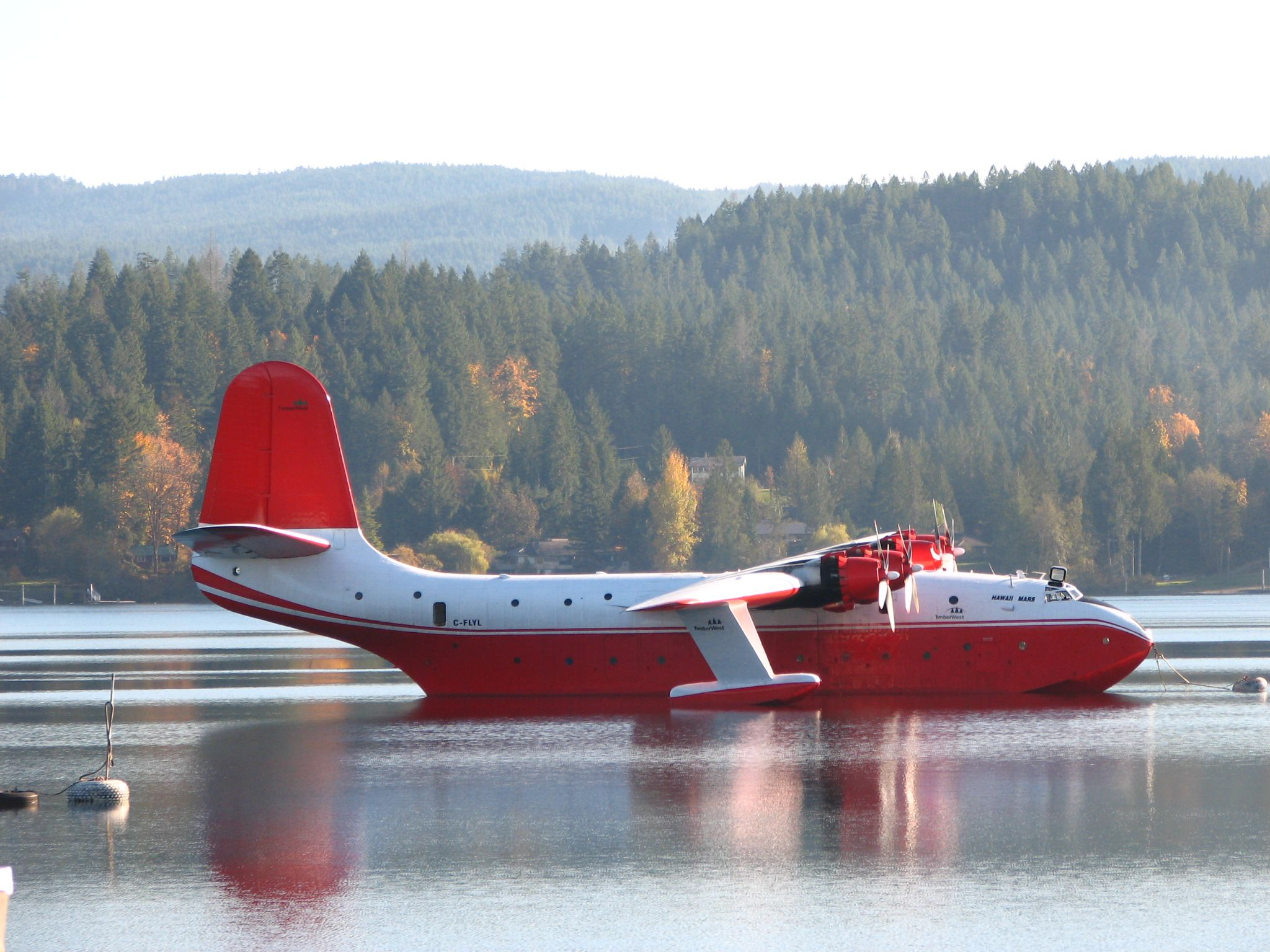
The Martin JRM Mars was one of the aircraft featured in season 1

A typical Mighty Planes episode highlights one plane or group of them. Aircraft featured range from the Orbis flying eye hospital to the largest passenger jet ever built, to Air Force aircraft such as the Lockheed C-5 Galaxy. The episodes follow the aircraft while it is on a flight or mission start to finish. Similarly to Mighty Ships, Mighty Planes uses computer-generated animation to show scenes which would not otherwise be doable.

After a lengthy hiatus, the series returned in 2017 with its 4th and most recent season. Mike Goral, who narrated the first 3 seasons of the series, was replaced by Jamie Carr.

== Episode ==
=== Season 1 ===
No. in series	No. in season	Title	Aircraft type	Aircraft operator	Narrated by	Original air date
1	1	Orbis	McDonnell Douglas DC-10	Orbis	Mike Goral	February 26, 2012
The ORBIS McDonnell Douglas DC-10, the world's only flying eye-hospital. In this episode the aircraft heads to Ulaanbaatar, Mongolia. On the way it is plagued by a series of setbacks that threaten to derail the trip entirely. Note: The Aircraft featured in this episode (N220AU) has since been retired to the Pima Air & Space Museum.
2	2	Martin Mars	Martin JRM Mars	Coulson Flying Tankers Inc.	Mike Goral	February 26, 2012
The Martin Mars water bomber is the world's largest seaplane. In this episode, the Mars heads to Mexico to fight one of the country's worst fire seasons. Over the 16 days there, the Mars fights fires, mechanical breakdowns, severe weather, and crew exhaustion to get the job done. Note: The Aircraft featured in this episode (Hawaii Mars II) has since been retired and preserved at the British Columbia Aviation Museum.
3	3	Hercules LC-130 Skibird	Lockheed LC-130	United States Air Force	Mike Goral	March 4, 2012
The Skibirds are the go-to aircraft for tough jobs in frozen places. In this episode, two Skibirds prepare to evacuate climate scientists from Greenland's icy terrain. This mission will push the team and their powerful cargo plane to the limit as they attempt to fly, land, and take off in a country that holds the record for the worst flying conditions on the planet.
4	4	Antonov 124	Antonov 124	Antonov Airlines	Mike Goral	March 4, 2012
The Antonov 124 is the largest serially manufactured cargo plane in the world. In this episode, the Antonov and its crew embark on a two-day, 7,500-mile mission, dealing with extreme weather and an exhaustive inspection that could reveal flaws too costly to repair.
5	5	Airbus A380	Airbus A380	Lufthansa	Mike Goral	March 4, 2012
Follows Lufthansa's maiden A380 flight from Frankfurt, Germany to San Francisco. Note: The Aircraft featured in this episode (D-AIMD) is currently stored.
6	6	C-5M Super Galaxy	C-5M Super Galaxy	United States Air Force	Mike Goral	March 11, 2012
The C-5 Galaxy is the U.S. Air Force's largest and most powerful plane. In this episode, a crew on board the new C-5M Super Galaxy embark on a record breaking nonstop flight to Bagram Airfield in Afghanistan.

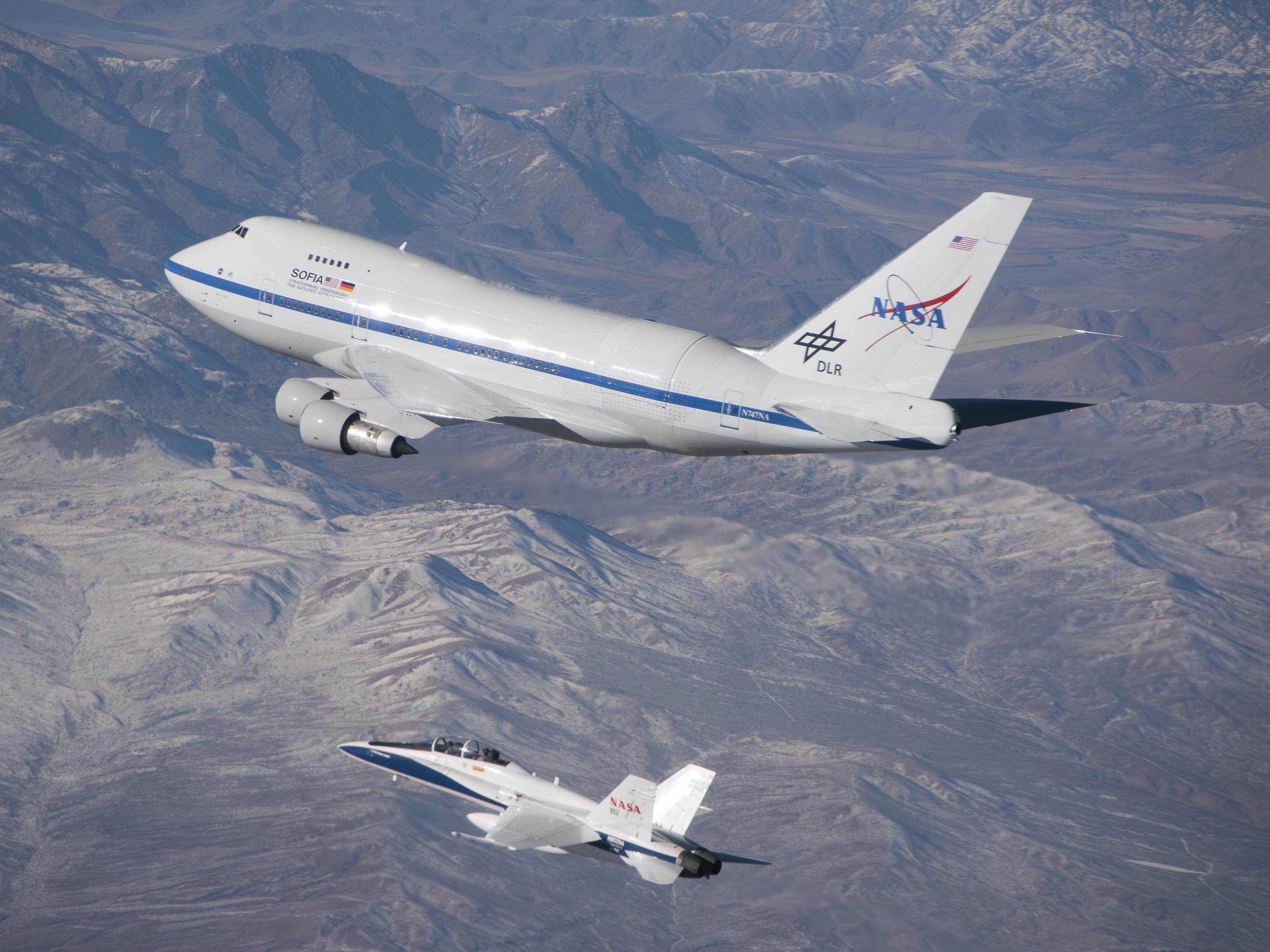
The Stratospheric Observatory for Infrared Astronomy was featured in season 2

=== Season 2 ===
No. in series	No. in season	Title	Aircraft type	Aircraft operator	Narrated by	Original air date
7	1	Trump 757	Boeing 757	Donald Trump	Mike Goral	June 9, 2013
Donald Trump owns one of the largest and most luxurious private jets. In this episode, Trump's 757 embarks from Florida to New York to London, with a pit stop in Georgia for an inspection that doesn't go quite as expected. Tight deadlines and a demanding boss push his pilot to the limits.
8	2	C-17 Globemaster	C-17 Globemaster	United States Air Force	Mike Goral	June 9, 2013
The C-17 Globemaster III is the newest, most flexible cargo aircraft to enter the U.S. airlift force. In this episode we see two of the jets take off on separate missions. One ventures into an intense war training operation over unforgiving terrain, while the other embarks on a grueling three-day journey to deliver missile launchers from a remote Pacific island to California.
9	3	Omega 707	Boeing 707	Omega Aerial Refueling Services	Mike Goral	June 12, 2013
Omega Aerial Refueling is the only service to provide commercial air-to-air refueling. In this episode, the company's 707 tanker lends its support to a three-day U.S. Navy and Marine Corps exercise.
10	4	P-3 Orion	Lockheed WP-3D Orion	National Oceanic and Atmospheric Administration	Mike Goral	June 12, 2013
The P-3 Orion named Kermit once hunted Soviet submarines but now hunts hurricanes. It slices through their eye walls with one objective in mind: to collect information that will save lives. Note: Kermit was involved in an incident in 1989 while on a flight through the eye of Hurricane Hugo.
11	5	SOFIA	Boeing 747SP	NASA	Mike Goral	June 16, 2013
The SOFIA 747 is one of the few 747SP's left in the world flying and has been converted by NASA into a space observatory in the sky. After being grounded for upgrades and overhaul maintenance and four months behind schedule, the crew needs to work overtime to get SOFIA ready to, once more, unravel the mysteries of the cosmos. Note: SOFIA was retired in 2022 and is now preserved at the Pima Air & Space Museum.
12	6	Blue Angels	McDonnell Douglas F/A-18 Hornet	United States Navy	Mike Goral	June 16, 2013
This episodes explores amazing aircraft and the men and women around the world who build, maintain, shepherd, and fly the F-18's of the US Navy's Blue Angels. Note: All aircraft seen in this episode have been retired as of 2020, when the Blue Angels have transitioned from F/A-18 aircraft and now operate F/A-18E/F Super Hornets.

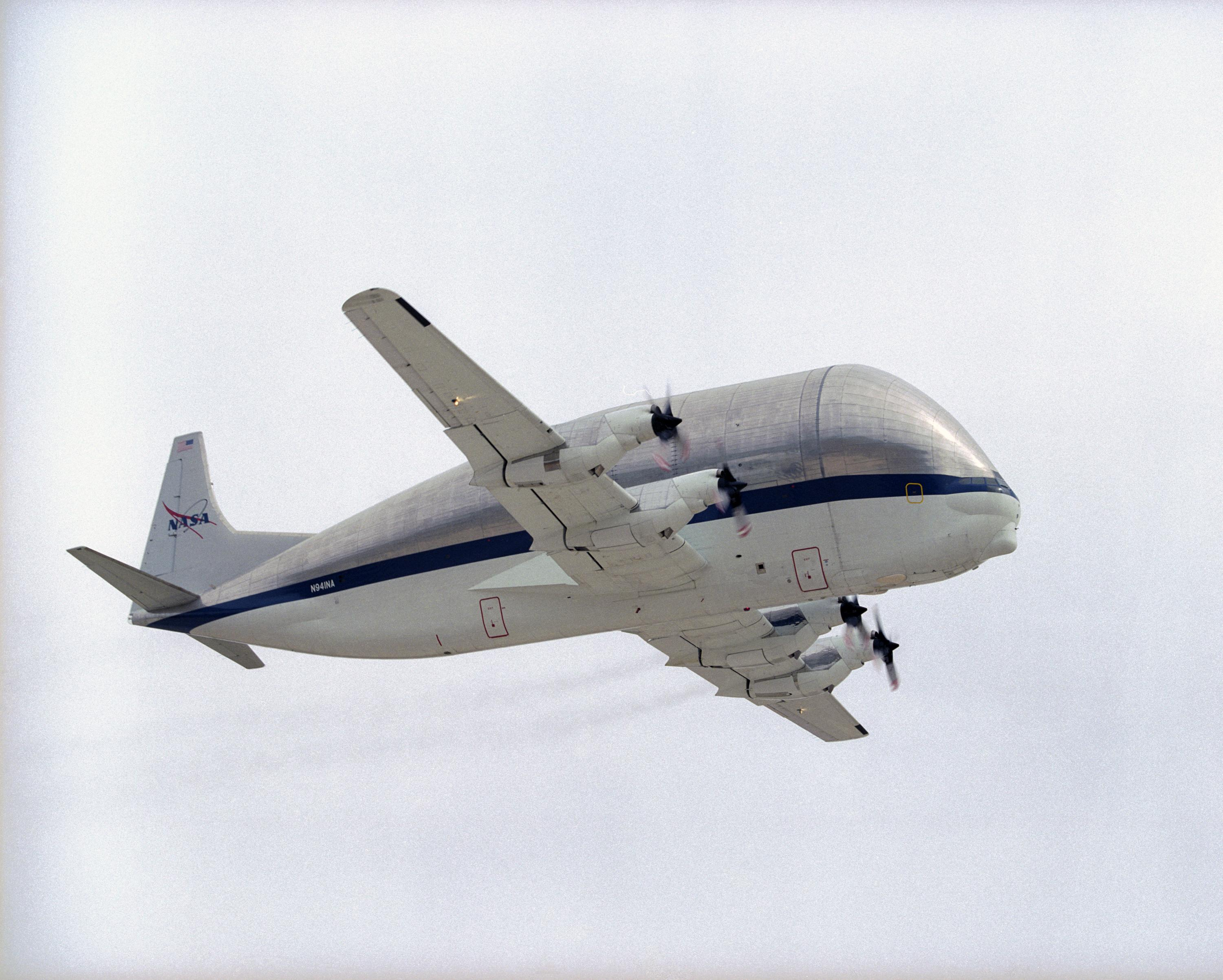
NASA's Aero Spacelines Super Guppy was featured in season 3

=== Season 3 ===
No. in series	No. in season	Title	Aircraft type	Aircraft operator	Narrated by	Original air date
13	1	Aurora CP140	Lockheed CP-140 Aurora	Royal Canadian Air Force	Mike Goral	May 24, 2015
It's been called one of the greatest submarine hunters in the world, and it's still one of Canadas best kept secrets: the CP-140 Aurora. This Cold War legend remains a state-of-the-art spymaster, flying 17 hours straight to find ISIS targets in Iraq or exposing illegal traffickers around the globe.
14	2	T-38 Talon	T-38 Talon	United States Air Force	Mike Goral	May 29, 2015
The T-38 Talon is a twin-engine, two-seat, supersonic marvel. It climbs 30,000 feet per minute, flies at a speed of 858 miles per hour, and rolls up to 300 degrees per second. This episode follows three student NATO pilots who push the T-38 and themselves to the limit.
15	3	CC-115 Buffalo	CC-115 Buffalo	Royal Canadian Air Force	Mike Goral	June 5, 2015
When lives are in peril on Canadas West Coast, the search and rescue plane everyone counts on is the CC-115 Buffalo. This Canadian Air Force legend can turn on a dime inside the dangerously boxed valleys of British Columbia, and take off and land on rugged terrain as short as a soccer field. Because the Buffalo responds to over 200 emergency calls every year, training the crew is vital to success. This episode follows the Buffalo crew on two training exercises: saving sailors in a sinking vessel at sea and searching for a missing aircraft.
16	4	Super Guppy	Aero Spacelines Super Guppy	NASA	Mike Goral	June 12, 2015
The NASA Super Guppy is a jerry-rigged wonder, built from parts of 1950s planes. But her cargo is anything but retro. She has hauled vital aerospace hardware across the US in her 50+ years of service, including parts of Apollo, the Hubble Space Telescope, and Skylab. Now, after being grounded for eight months for major upgrades and maintenance, she and her dedicated crew are back on the job, picking up and delivering a multi-million-dollar payload on a challenging three-day mission.
17	5	Nolinor	Boeing 737-200	Nolinor Aviation	Mike Goral	June 19, 2015
Nolinor Aviation's 737-200 Combi is a combination cargo and passenger aircraft, delivering essential food, equipment, and workers to Meadowbank, the coldest mine on Earth. The gold mine depends on this super hauler four times a week, but common temperatures of minus 50 degrees often wreak havoc on the aircraft and her missions. Follow her on a typical job, which poses challenges that are anything but routine.
18	6	Best of Mighty Planes	A380, Blue Angels, Orbis DC-10,	Lufthansa, United States Air Force, Orbis	Mike Goral	June 23, 2015
Compilation episode featuring planes from season 1 and 2.

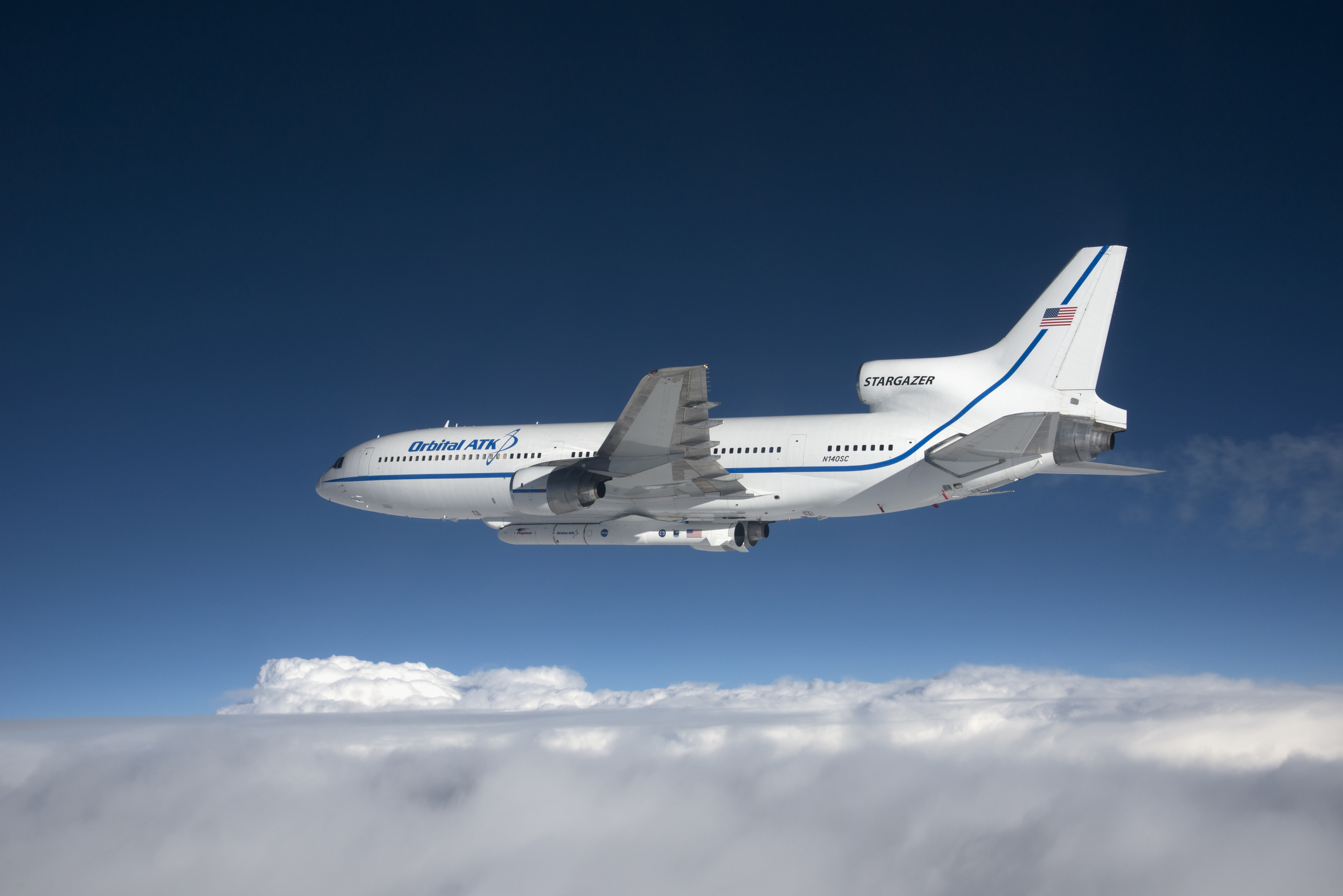
The Stargazer L1011 was featured in season 4

=== Season 4 ===
No. in series	No. in season	Title	Aircraft type	Aircraft operator	Narrated by	Original air date
19	1	Boeing 747-8F	Boeing 747-8F	AirBridgeCargo	Jamie Carr	October 1, 2017
AirBrideCargo's 757-8F embarks on a nail-biting flight to deliver gear for Formula E's 10 electric-powered racing teams to cities around the world across more than 50,000 total kilometers.
20	2	Stargazer L-1011	Lockheed L-1011 TriStar	Orbital ATK	Jamie Carr	October 8, 2017
Stargazer is the only L1011 Tristar left in the world flying. But it's not your ordinary L1011. The Stargazer is able to shoot NASA weather satellites into space from 39,000 feet in the air. See how this onetime Air Canada jetliner was converted to carry a very different kind of passenger: the Pegasus XL rocket, which launches satellites designed to detect the speed and intensity of hurricanes. Follow the Stargazer on her latest mission, one plagued by bad weather, mechanical issues, and launch delays. Note: The Aircraft featured in this episode (N140SC) remains the only airworthy L1011 as of 2019.
21	3	C2A Greyhound	C2A Greyhound	United States Navy	Jamie Carr	October 15, 2017
The C-2 Greyhound has a unique design; it provides critical logistics support for the U.S. Navy. An unsung hero of the U.S. Navy, this episode follows the young pilots training to fly this mighty transport plane.
22	4	Ilyushin IL-76	Ilyushin IL-76	Volga-Dnepr Airlines	Jamie Carr	October 22, 2017
The Ilyushin IL-76 embarks to Baffinland Mines, which needs to get equipment to a remote mine in Nunavut to support shipping operations for the summer.
23	5	Airbus A400M	Airbus A400M Atlas	German Air Force	Jamie Carr	October 29, 2017
The German Air Force is overhauling their entire fleet of outdated cargo planes. Discover what it takes to build, fly, and leap out of their mighty new cargo plane, the A400M Atlas.
24	6	Twin Otter	Twin Otter	Royal Canadian Air Force	Jamie Carr	November 5, 2017
The Twin Otter is found around the world in jungles, deserts, mountains, the Arctic. Take flight on the Canadian legend that can take off and land in spots few other planes could.

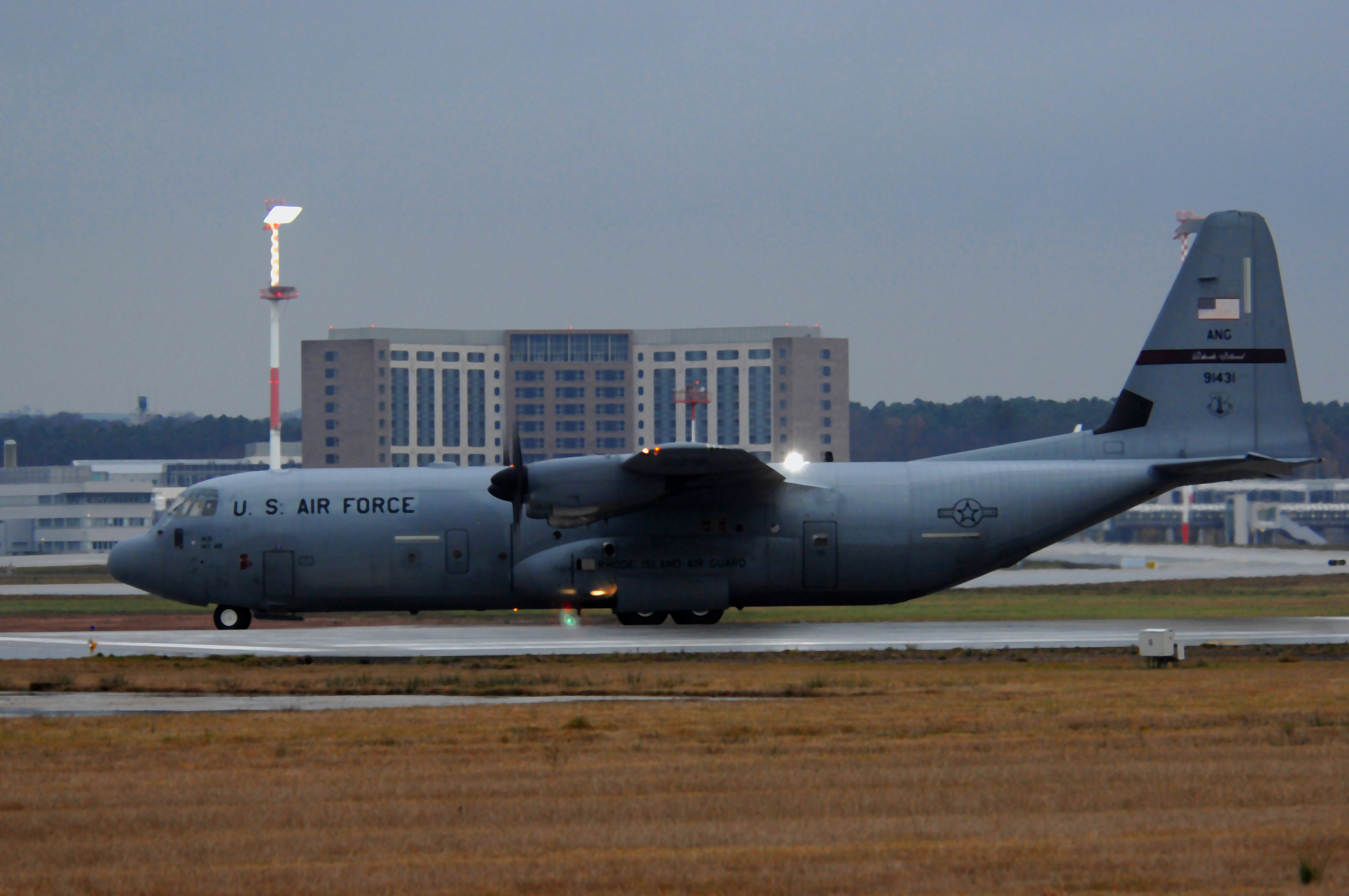
The Lockheed C-130 Hercules was featured in the Mighty Planes Stand Alone Special, Heroic Hercules

=== Specials ===
No. in series	No. in season	Title	Aircraft type	Aircraft operator	Narrated by	Original air date
N/A	N/A	Mighty Planes: Heroic Hercules	C-130 Hercules	United States Air Force	Mike Goral	September 28, 2014 (Canada)
The Lockheed Martin C-130 Hercules has been the go-to tactical cargo and personnel transporter for the U.S. Air Force and has served 70 countries on multiple missions. At more than half a century old, she's tougher than ever. Celebrate this champion in times of war and peace as we revisit her history of daring efforts and detail how she continues to serve today. From her painstaking assembly to the challenges she faces on the ground and in the air, get an all-access look at the most heroic airlifter ever.
