= Homosexuality (disambiguation) =

Homosexuality is romantic attraction, sexual attraction, or sexual behavior between people of the same sex or gender.

Homosexuality may also refer to:

- "Homosexuality", an episode of the Australian TV show Sex (1992)
- Homosexuality", an episode of the Canadian television news magazine program Prisoners of Gravity (1994)
- "Homosexuality", an episode of the Canadian documentary The Sex Files (2003)
- "Omosessualità" (English: "Homosexuality"), a song by Italian comedy rock group Elio e le Storie Tese from Eat the Phikis (1996)
- "Homosexuality", a sermon by American Christian clergyman and peace activist William Sloane Coffin
- Homosexuality: Lesbians and Gay Men in Society, History, and Literature, a 1975 book edited by Jonathan Ned Katz
