= Beyond Invention =

- Genre: Documentary
- Presented by: Steve Bennett; John Hutchinson
- Country of origin: Canada
- Original language: English
- No. of seasons: 1
- No. of episodes: 8

Production
- Producer: Peter von Puttkamer
- Production locations: Albuquerque, New Mexico, United States
- Running time: 46 minutes
- Production company: Mystique Films

Original release
- Release: 12 February 2004

Beyond Invention is an 8-part documentary television series that premiered on February 12, 2004, on Discovery Channel Canada and, as of 2007, airs on the Science Channel.

The series was produced by Mystique Films in partnership with Gryphon Productions and is narrated by John Payne. It primarily focuses on cutting edge and fringe science and technology.

== Episodes ==
1. New Energy: New forms of energy resources. Features John Hutchison (the "Hutchison Effect"): Col. John B. Alexander (United States Army Intelligence and Security Command, retired; psychokinetic investigator), Nick Cook (Jane's Defence Weekly), zero-point battery. Anti-gravity: Tim Ventura (lifter researcher), ion wind. Joseph Newman's energy machine: Milton Everett (retired mechanical engineer), publicist Evan Soule, Alvin Swimmer, patent attorney Paul Gomory.
2. Cryptozoology: Rick Noll stalks Bigfoot, artist Jason Walton and scientist Dr. Paul LeBlond tracks a 60-foot (18 m)-long sea monster, and Dean Harrison tracks the Tasmanian tiger, which experts say died out 70 years ago.
3. Cloning: Brigitte Boisselier says she's already cloned five humans, Robert Lanza is using cloning to rescue endangered species, and Lou Hawthorne of Genetic Savings & Clone clones pets.
4. Amazing Flying Machines: Hovercraft, flying cars, space tourism. Features inventors Kevin Inkster, Paul Moller, and Steve Bennett.
5. Animal-Inspired Innovations: Jeffrey Turner, a geneticist who stops bullets by splicing spiders with goats. Keller Autumn, a biologist who dreams of sending robotic lizards to Mars. Bob McIntyre, a country inventor unleashing a bionic predator over the rooftops of Scotland.
6. Gadgets: Features toymaker Brian Walker, composer Tod Machover, and Mike Wescombe-Down, the creator of a shark-stopping device.
7. Enhancing Sexuality: Using silicone for enhancing sex. Features Michelle Mone (cleavage enhancement), Jana Sylvest and Otter Louis (erotic toys), and Matt McMullen (lifelike dolls).
8. Artificial Intelligence: Barry Spletzer builds flying robots, cyber pioneer Demetri Terzopoulos creates life inside the computer, and electronics engineer Robert Michelson brings smart swarming bugs to the military.
