= Dave Pettitt =

Canadian actor (born 1972)

- Occupation: Actor
- Years active: 1995–present
- Spouse: Mindi Pettitt
- Website: www.davepettitt.com

Dave Pettitt is a Canadian actor who has performed in commercials, television and voice-overs.

== Career ==
Since 1995 he has voiced roles for over ten television series and at least five video games. These roles include several Gundam series, mainly G Gundam and Zeta Gundam. He provided the voices for several minor characters in the Blue Water Studios dubbed versions of Dragon Ball and Dragon Ball GT, and has provided the voices for several characters in the Chaotic Century and Guardian Force Zoids anime dubs. He has also participated in multiple Mega Man and Gundam video games.

In 2012 Pettitt started narrating of The Weather Channel and Discovery Canada TV series Highway Thru Hell, which has become one of the most watched TV-series in history.

In 2014 Pettitt narrated the French game Valiant Hearts: The Great War which was set during the first world war. Valiant Hearts went on to win a BAFTA Award.

On January 3, 2016, the sister series of Highway Thru Hell, Heavy Rescue: 401 aired its first episode. Pettitt also narrates this show.

He also supplied his voice in the Australian hip-hop group Hilltop Hoods song "Art of the Handshake".

In 2018 Pettitt guest-starred in the My Little Pony: Friendship is Magic episode "Father Knows Beast" as Sludge.

In 2020, Pettitt provided narration for the video "Hunting Heehoo" on the now defunct YouTube channel Unus Annus.

He works from his studio in Nanaimo, British Columbia.

Pettitt currently owns his own company, Dave Pettitt Voice Overs Inc.

=== Credits ===
- Airshow — Narrator
- Angel Links — Chenho-Li
- Battle Assault 3 featuring Gundam Seed — Master Asia
- Betterman — Akamatsu Shingeru
- Benjamin Blumchen — Benjamin
- Gregory Horror Show — Gregory
- Death Note — Deridovely
- Dragon Ball and Dragon Ball GT — Hercule, Ox King, Mr. Popo, Dr.Myuu, Shenron, Turtle (Blue Water Dub)
- Dynasty Warriors: Gundam — Master Asia
- Dynasty Warriors: Gundam 2 — Master Asia
- Gundam: Battle Assault 2 — Master Asia
- Gypsy Guide- Hawaii audio tour guide — Narrator
- Heavy Rescue: 401 — Narrator
- Highway Thru Hell — Narrator
- Inuyasha — Hōsenki I
- Iron Lung — The Father
- Mobile Fighter G Gundam — Master Asia
- Mobile Suit Gundam: Gundam vs. Zeta Gundam — Henken Bekkener
- Mobile Suit Gundam: Zeonic Front — MCPO Austin
- Mobile Suit Zeta Gundam — Henken Bekkener, narrator
- My Little Pony: Friendship Is Magic — Sludge
- Jungo — Sharpclaws, Ramone, Hollywood Bear, Blitz
- Mega Man X8 — Sigma, Avalanche Yeti
- Reaching for Petals — Narrator
- Saber Marionette J to X — Kamataro Hanagata
- Zoids: Chaotic Century and Zoids: Guardian Force — Doctor D., Rosso, Zeke, Shadow, Ambient, Specular
- Valiant Hearts: The Great War — Narrator

== Personal life ==
He and his wife Mindi Pettitt, along with their dogs Lemon and Taco, enjoy the West Coast life from their home in Nanaimo.
