= John S. Slattery =

Aviation business executive

- Born: September 1968 (age 57); Ireland
- Education: Harvard Business School (AMP) University of Limerick (MBA) University of Glamorgan (BA)
- Title: Executive Vice President and Chief Commercial Officer
- Term: June 2022 - present
- Board member of: Aerospace Industries Association (AIA) Smithsonian National Air & Space Museum

John Stephen Slattery is an aviation business executive. Currently he is executive vice president and chief commercial officer of GE Aviation. He previously served as the company's president and CEO of GE Aviation from 2020 through 2022. Prior to GE, Slattery worked at Embraer's Commercial Aviation Division and served as the division's president and CEO from 2011 to 2020.

== Early life and education ==
Slattery was born and raised in Ireland, near Shannon Airport where his passion for aviation started. He earned an Advanced Management program (AMP) certificate of completion from Harvard Business School, a BA from University of Glamorgan and an MBA from University of Limerick. In 2021, he was awarded with an honorary Doctorate in Economic Science.

== Career ==
Slattery started his aviation career as a consultant in the Treasury & Fleet Planning departments of Brazilian flag carrier VARIG. He spent the following fifteen years in various executive roles at commercial aerospace advisory, aircraft leasing, and aerospace banking organizations. In 2011, Slattery pivoted from the world of aviation finance to manufacturing when he joined the leadership team at Embraer S.A. focusing his attention on customer finance, risk, and asset management.

Slattery served as president and CEO of Embraer Commercial Aviation leading Embraer's largest business with more than half of the group's revenue and cash flow. During his tenure the E-jet increased the number of installations. In 2018, he was responsible for the business plan of the triple-certification of the E190-E2 within schedule and budget.

In 2020, GE Aviation announced that Slattery has been named president and CEO being responsible for commercial and military jet engines and services as well as avionics, digital solutions, and electrical power systems for aircraft.

Since June 2022, Slattery serves as executive vice president and chief commercial officer of GE Aviation.

Slattery is also a Fellow at the Royal Aeronautical Society, president emeritus of The Wings Club Foundation and director emeritus of ORBIS International.

Furthermore, he sits on the boards of governors of the Aerospace Industries Association (AIA) and the Smithsonian National Air & Space Museum.
