= Lovitz =

Lovitz is a surname. Notable people with the surname include:

- Daniel Lovitz (born 1991), American professional soccer player
- Jon Lovitz (born 1957), American comedian, actor, and singer
- Jonathan Lovitz (born 1984), American LGBT rights advocate and actor
