= Mighty Trains =

- Genre: Documentary
- Created by: Discovery Channel
- Narrated by: Teddy Wilson
- Music by: Greg Johnston
- Country of origin: Canada
- Original language: English
- No. of seasons: 4
- No. of episodes: 24

Production
- Running time: 60 minutes

Original release
- Network: Discovery Channel Canada
- Release: 16 October 2016 – 27 August 2021

Mighty Trains (also known as Megatrains on Discovery Channel Australia) is a documentary television program, part of the "Mighty" franchise, alongside Mighty Planes, Mighty Cruise Ships, Mighty Ships and The Mightiest. This series was produced in Canada and aired on the Discovery Channel Canada. Smithsonian Channel had an executive production role in Season 1. Each episode of the series follows a particular train.

== Episodes ==
Series	Episodes	Originally released	
Series	Episodes	First released	Last released
1	6	16 October 2016	20 November 2016
2	6	14 October 2018	18 November 2018
3	6	13 October 2019	17 November 2019
4	6	11 July 2021	29 August 2021

=== Season 1 (2016) ===
No. overall	No. in season	Title	Original release date
1	1	"Glacier Express"	16 October 2016
2	2	"The Shinkansen"	23 October 2016
3	3	"The Canadian"	30 October 2016
4	4	"White Pass and Yukon Route"	6 November 2016
5	5	"North Rail Express"	13 November 2016
6	6	"The Ghan"	20 November 2016

=== Season 2 (2018) ===
No. overall	No. in season	Title	Original release date
7	1	"Rocky Mountaineer"	14 October 2018
8	2	"Tren Crucero"	21 October 2018
9	3	"Maharajas' Express"	28 October 2018
10	4	"AVE 103"	4 November 2018
11	5	"Kiwi Rail"	11 November 2018
12	6	"Hector Rail"	18 November 2018

=== Season 3 (2019) ===
No. overall	No. in season	Title	Original release date
13	1	"Thai Railway and Death Railway"	13 October 2019
14	2	"Rovos Rail"	20 October 2019
15	3	"Bernina Express"	27 October 2019
16	4	"Indian Pacific"	3 November 2019
17	5	"Bergen and Nordland Lines"	10 November 2019
18	6	"Frecciarossa 1000 and Italo EVO"	17 November 2019

=== Season 4 (2021) ===
No. overall	No. in season	Title	Original release date
19	1	"Tren Turistico"	11 July 2021
20	2	"Transcantábrico Clásico"	18 July 2021
21	3	"Seven Stars in Kyushu"	25 July 2021
22	4	"Belgrade to Bar Railway"	15 August 2021
23	5	"Reunification Express"	22 August 2021
24	6	"Coastal Pacific"	29 August 2021
