= Airshow (TV series) =

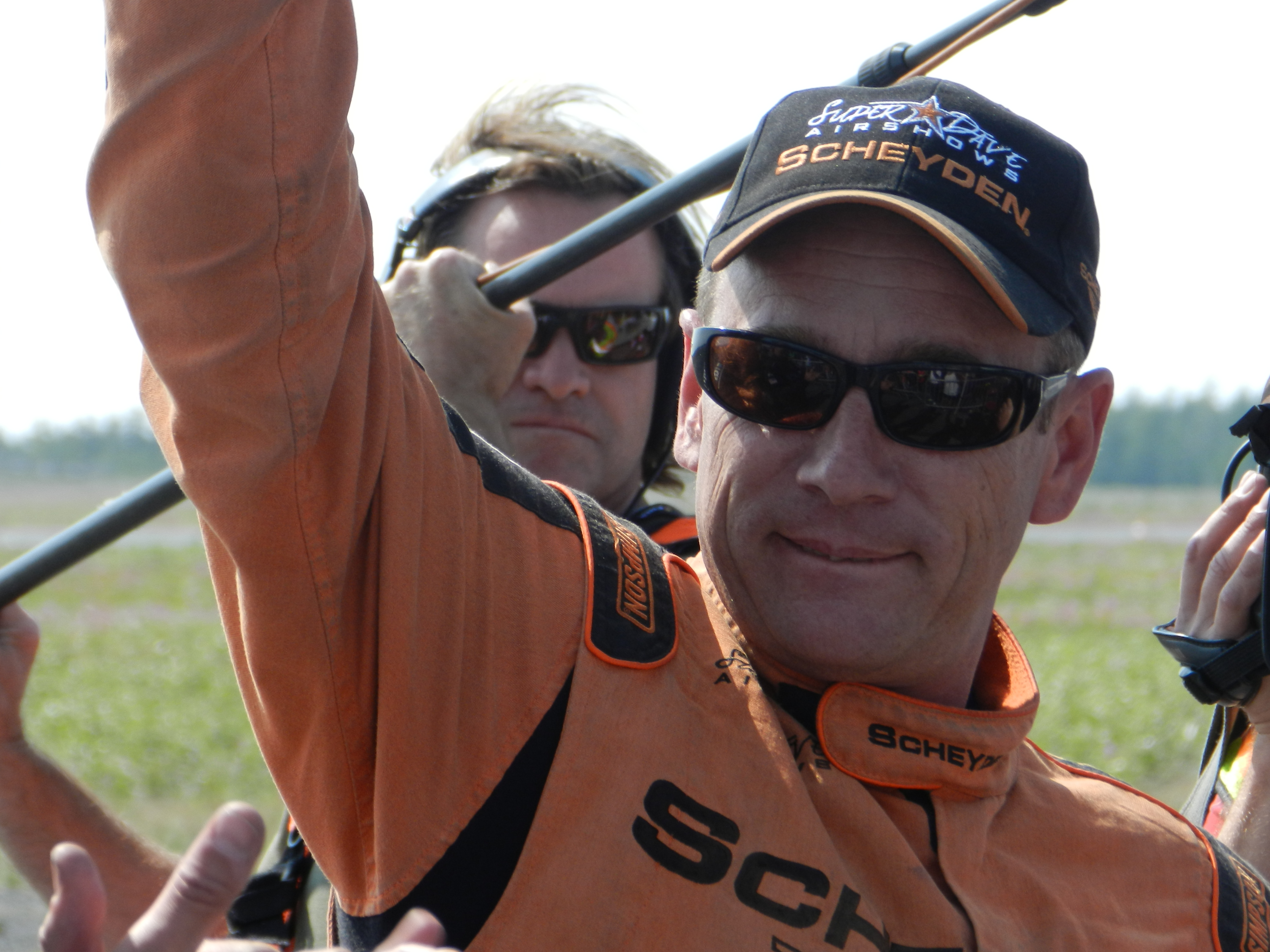
- "Super Dave" Mathieson
- Genre: Documentary
- Created by: Great Pacific Television
- Starring: "Super Dave" Mathieson; Carol Pilon; Marcus Paine; Patriots Jet Team; Pete McLeod; Donna Flynn; Stefan Trischuck; Jon Melby; Sean Tucker
- Narrated by: Dave Pettitt
- Country of origin: Canada
- Original language: English
- No. of seasons: 1
- No. of episodes: 12

Production
- Executive producer: Mark Miller
- Production locations: Canada, United States
- Running time: 45–46 minutes

Original release
- Network: Discovery Channel (Canada)
- Release: January 26 – June 22, 2015

Airshow is a reality TV show that follows a group of airshow pilots and performers across Canada and the United States. The show focuses on the over dramatized hardships of preparing for and performing in air shows.

On June 1, 2015, four additional episodes began airing.

== History ==
The show debuted on the Discovery Channel on January 26, 2015 in Canada. Filmed during the 2013 and 2014 seasons, crashes, mechanical problems, and tornadic weather hamper the pilots' and performers' ability to take to the sky.

== Episodes ==
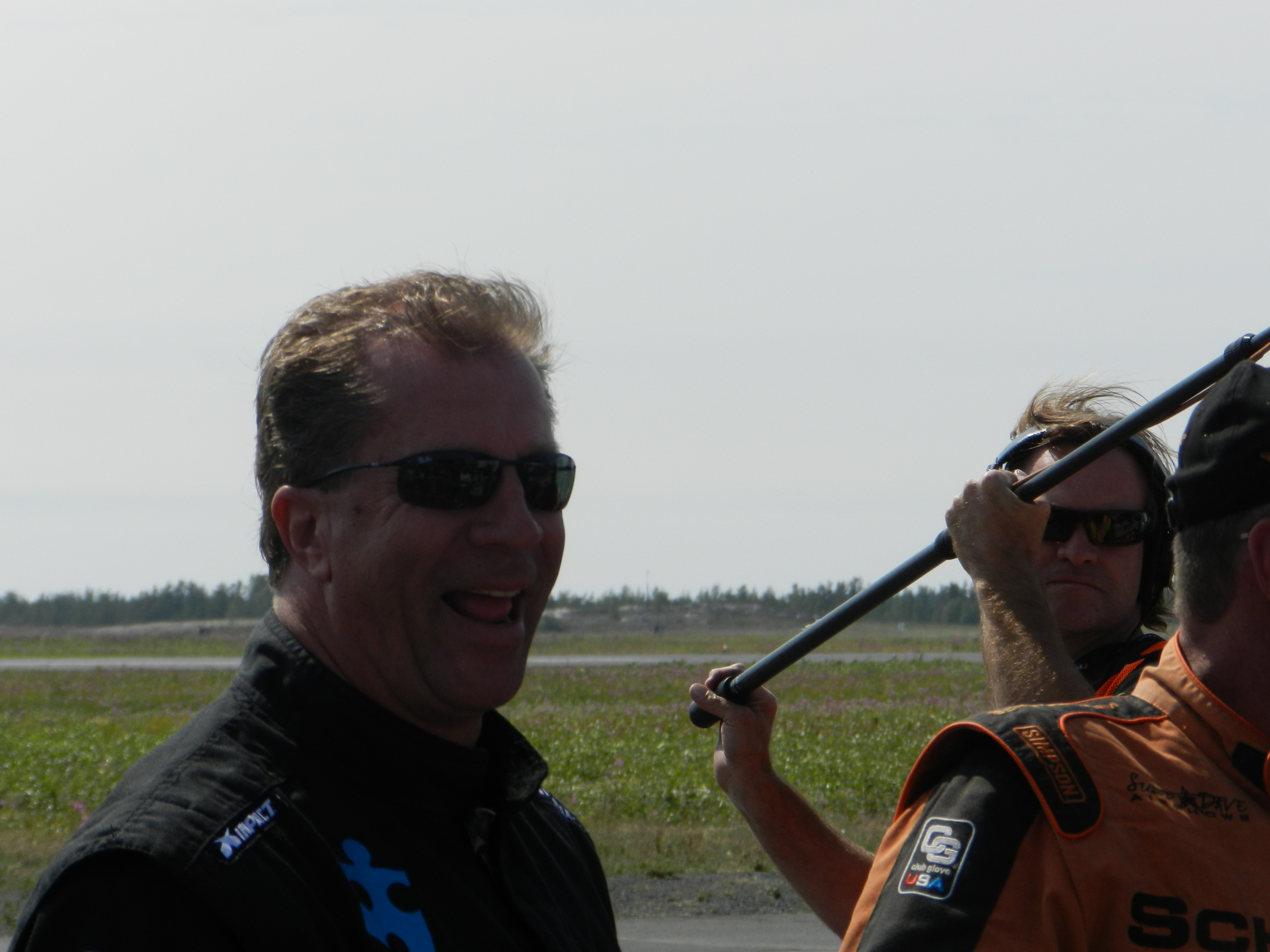
Jon Melby

No.	Title	Original release date
1	"Cleared for Take Off"	January 26, 2015
2	"Light the Fires"	February 2, 2015
3	"Adrenaline Overload"	February 9, 2015
4	"Water Worlds"	February 16, 2015
5	"Afterburner"	February 23, 2015
6	"On the Edge"	March 2, 2015
7	"Two for One"	March 9, 2015
8	"Hasta La Vista Baby!"	March 23, 2015
9	"Double Trouble"	June 1, 2015
10	"No Risk - No Business"	June 8, 2015
11	"Too Close for Comfort"	June 15, 2015
12	"Breaking Point"	June 22, 2015
