= Setup Squad =

Television series

- Genre: Reality
- Country of origin: United States
- Original language: English
- No. of seasons: 1
- No. of episodes: 10

Production
- Executive producers: Brent Montgomery; Colby Gaines; David George; Dave Mace; Christopher Willey
- Production location: New York City
- Production company: Leftfield Pictures

Original release
- Network: Logo
- Release: April 25 – June 29, 2011

Setup Squad is an American reality television series from the LGBT-interest network Logo. The series follows the owner and staff of Wings, Inc., a dating agency in New York City specializing in professional dating experts or "wingmen" who give their clients a dating make-over.

== Cast ==
- Renee Lee
- Jonathan Lovitz
- Lauretta Nkwocha
- Helen Hong
- Meredith Schlosser

== Episodes ==
No.	Title	Original release date
1	"Tim & Zakeenah"	April 25, 2011
2	"Emanuel & Toy"	May 2, 2011
3	"Kathy & Vinnie"	May 9, 2011
4	"Linden & Neal"	May 16, 2011
5	"David & Sarah"	May 23, 2011
6	"Arthur & Suzanne"	May 30, 2011
7	"Evan & Olivia"	June 6, 2011
8	"Lorraine & Zed"	June 15, 2011
9	"Teresa & Thomas"	June 22, 2011
10	"Francesca & Seth"	June 29, 2011
