= Star Racer =

Canadian television series

Star Racer is a Canadian reality television show which originally aired on Discovery Channel Canada in 2006. It has been airing from October 2008 on Discovery's HD Theater, partly filmed from Circuit Mont-Tremblant. Star Racer depicts the discovery and episode-by-episode elimination of amateur drivers in Canada over a period of eight weeks. Racers participate in weekly racing events in a competition to prove themselves as the top talent. Host Yannick Bisson sets the stakes, and is the liaison between the drivers, the judges, and the audience. Eight kart racers and eight drivers from other racing disciplines vie for the title of "Star Racer" and a career-making prize. The prize is a ride in the Formula Mazda Championship Racing Series where they will test their skills against professional racers.

== Cast ==
Host:

- Yannick Bisson

The Judges:

- Derek Daly – former F1 and Indycar driver and commentator
- Paul Tracy – Canadian former Champcar/CART driver
- Katherine Legge – Champcar and DTM Driver
- Philippé Letourneau – Jim Russell Chief Instructor
- Jacques Dallaire – Performance Coach

The Contestants:

- Adam Boutaleb
- Chris Green
- Stefany Malanka
- Devin Cunningham – Winner
- Lorenzo Mandarino – Finalist
- Ed Hunt
- Kyle Herder
- Philippe Gelinas
- Rahul Dua
- Pearce Herder
- Kristina Allinson
- Blake Choquer
- Robin Ng
- Jenn Carlson
- Matt Champagne
- Darrel Vallie
- P.J. Groenke
- Jenn Carlson
- Rob Oakman
- Jennifer Rempel
