= The Mightiest =

Canadian documentary television series

- Presented by: Teddy Wilson; Aliya Jasmine
- Country of origin: Canada

Original release
- Network: Discovery Channel Canada

The Mightiest is a Canadian documentary television series, which premiered on Discovery Channel Canada in 2022. Hosted by Teddy Wilson and Aliya Jasmine, the series centres on the science behind very large transportation vessels such as ships, planes and trains.

It is the newest series in the Mighty franchise, following Mighty Ships, Mighty Planes, Mighty Trains and Mighty Cruise Ships, and blends both newly recorded segments on recent innovations with selected segments rebroadcast from the earlier series.

The series was nominated for the Rob Stewart Award for Best Science or Nature Documentary Program at the 11th Canadian Screen Awards in 2023.
