= USA Network (Canada) =

Canadian cable television channel

- Country: Canada
- Broadcast area: Nationwide
- Headquarters: 9 Channel Nine Court, Scarborough, Ontario

Programming
- Language: English
- Picture format: 1080i HDTV (downscaled to letterboxed 480i for the SDTV feed)

Ownership
- Owner: CTV Specialty Television (2953285 Canada Inc.) (Branding licensed from Versant)
- Sister channels: CTV; CTV 2 CTV Comedy Channel; CTV Drama Channel; CTV Life Channel; CTV Nature Channel; CTV Sci-Fi Channel; CTV Speed Channel; CTV Wild Channel; Oxygen; Noovo (French language)

History
- Launched: January 1, 1995; 31 years ago
- Former names: Discovery Channel (1994–2025)

Links
- Website: USA Network Canada

USA Network is a Canadian discretionary specialty television channel owned by CTV Specialty Television, Inc., a joint venture of Bell Media (80%) and ESPN, LLC (20%; ESPN is not believed to be directly involved in the operation of the channel). Based on the American channel of the same name, it primarily carries a general entertainment format focusing on television series, films, reality, and sports programming.

The channel was launched on January 1, 1995, by Labatt Communications as Discovery Channel, a Canadian version of the American cable network of the same name; as with its namesake, it primarily aired factual programming relating to topics such as science, technology, and nature, with a mix of original Canadian productions (including a daily news magazine that aired from its launch through 2018) and imported programming. By the 2010s, mirroring similar shifts by its American parent, the network shifted to primarily airing reality-style programs, and later added reruns of scripted programming (particularly police procedurals) from other Bell Media channels.

In June 2024, Rogers Sports & Media announced that it had acquired the Canadian rights to all Warner Bros. Discovery (WBD) factual and lifestyle brands beginning January 1, 2025, including Discovery Channel. Bell subsequently announced that it would enter into a licensing agreement with NBCUniversal and later Versant for two of its Discovery-branded channels, with Discovery being relaunched as USA Network on January 1, 2025. A new iteration of Discovery owned by Rogers concurrently launched the same day.

As a former Category A service, Discovery Channel was required to be carried on the basic service of all digital cable providers across Canada. The channel was, and still is as USA Network, typically offered optionally at the discretion of cable or satellite providers.

== History ==
=== Early years ===
In October 1992, brewer John Labatt Ltd.—owner of TSN through its JLL Broadcast Group division, later renamed Labatt Communications—announced an agreement with Discovery Communications to apply to the Canadian Radio-television and Telecommunications Commission (CRTC) for a specialty television licence, to launch a Canadian service similar to the Discovery Channel in the United States. Under the agreement, Discovery Communications would supply up to 400 hours of programming per year to the Canadian channel.

Following hearings in February 1994, the channel was licensed by the CRTC that June, as part of a wave of new licences that included the specialty channels now known as CMT, CTV Drama, Slice, Showcase, and W Network. During the licensing process, the venture had received numerous letters of support from various science-focused and educational groups, and academics such as John Polanyi and Susan Mann. In its application, the channel promised a daily science-focused show, the first of its kind in North America, tentatively titled Canada Magazine.

The Discovery Channel launched in Canada on December 31, 1994, at 8 p.m. ET. The network was owned by Labatt Communications in partnership with Discovery Communications (which owned 20% of the venture), and was headed by former CBC executive Trina McQueen. Due to foreign ownership restrictions, Labatt Communications was later spun off and renamed NetStar Communications, as Labatt had been acquired by Interbrew.

The channel initially carried 40% Canadian content and 60% foreign content, but committed to eventually airing a total of 60% Canadian content throughout the broadcast day, with 20% of its programming originated by Discovery Channel U.S., and the remaining 20% coming from other international producers. The proposed Canada Magazine, which debuted as @discovery.ca and was later retitled Daily Planet, was part of the channel's launch schedule and ran until 2018.

On March 24, 2000, the CRTC approved a proposal by CTV Inc. to acquire voting interest in NetStar Communications Inc. CTV renamed the company CTV Specialty Television Inc.

A high definition simulcast feed of Discovery Channel that broadcasts in the 1080i resolution format was launched on August 15, 2003. The feed would later be shut down on December 19, 2005, and be replaced by a separate category 2 digital cable specialty channel called Discovery HD Theatre.

Logo used from 2009 until sometime in May 2020.

In the late 2000s and early 2010s, the channel followed its U.S. counterpart's shift away from natural history towards adventure and reality programming targeting male audiences, with series like Deadliest Catch, Highway Thru Hell, and Canada's Worst Driver.

Bell Globemedia was renamed to CTVglobemedia on January 1, 2007, after BCE Inc. reduced the stake to 15%. Bell Canada reacquired CTVgm in 2010 from The Woodbridge Company and renamed that division to Bell Media on April 1, 2011.

On June 17, 2011, Bell Media announced that it would launch, for a second time, an HD simulcast feed of Discovery Channel; this feed was launched on August 18, 2011. In 2013, the channel dropped the word "Channel" from its name.

=== Loss of Discovery rights, relaunch as USA (2024–25) ===
The final Discovery Channel logo used by the original iteration, used until January 1, 2025.

On June 10, 2024, Rogers Sports & Media announced it had reached an agreement with Warner Bros. Discovery (WBD) for Canadian rights to its lifestyle brands beginning in January 2025. Although not mentioned in Rogers' initial announcement, the company subsequently confirmed that the affected channels include Discovery Channel and other brands of the former Discovery Communications (pre-Scripps Networks Interactive merger) which had been managed by Bell in Canada. Bell then said in a statement that it would "assert [its] rights", citing non-compete protections it had previously negotiated against the launch of direct competitor channels. On June 19, Bell filed for an injunction against WBD and Rogers, demanding that it not supply any Discovery programming to Rogers for at least two years after its own deal expires, claiming it was entitled to a "window to adjust" under its outgoing contract in the event of non-renewal.

According to Rogers, the injunction requested by Bell would—if granted—prevent the company from operating any linear TV channels under the relevant brands during that timeframe, but would not affect other content rights. Nevertheless, Rogers subsequently announced plans to launch its own linear specialty channels under the Discovery and Investigation Discovery brands on January 1, 2025 (alongside Food Network, HGTV, and Magnolia Network), with all other brands launched digitally via Citytv+. In late-August, Bell stated that it had dropped its legal action against Rogers (thus allowing its relaunch of the Discovery brands to proceed), in favour of focusing on WBD having allegedly violated its right of first negotiation. On October 8, 2024, Bell settled with WBD, agreeing to a renewal of its library deals with HBO, HBO Max, and Warner Bros. for its Crave service, as well as co-production and international distribution pacts for Bell Media original programming.

On October 17, Bell Media announced it would relaunch Discovery as a Canadian version of USA Network on January 1, 2025, as part of an agreement with Comcast's NBCUniversal that would also see its version of Investigation Discovery relaunched under the similar Oxygen brand. The revamped channel carries a general entertainment format, with a focus on scripted dramas (including past and present USA Network original series such as Suits, upcoming USA series such as The Rainmaker, and new drama acquisitions such as HBO Max's The Pitt), original factual series carried over from Discovery, films, and some live sports programming sublicensed from TSN.

USA and Oxygen marked Bell's second and third active channel partnerships with Comcast, following the relaunch of Star! as E! in 2010; Comcast and Bell Media's predecessors were also co-owners of OLN from 1997 to 2008. In 2007, the CRTC rejected a request by Shaw Communications to add USA Network to the list of foreign television services eligible to be carried by Canadian television providers, on the basis that the channel carried too many programs already carried by other Canadian specialty services.

At some point after the rebranding, WBD divested its stakes in the channel.

== Programming ==
In addition to shows acquired from its American counterpart, the Canadian Discovery Channel produced much of its own original programming through its Exploration Production group including its former flagship daily science news program, Daily Planet, and its own domestic version of Cash Cab. Several programs produced by the Canadian Discovery Channel (such as How It's Made) have also aired on the American Science Channel.

Since 2015, enabled by that year's retirement of CRTC genre protection rules which mandated that it predominantly air factual programming, Discovery began to make ventures into scripted entertainment programming with loose connections to history or scientific concepts. In November 2015, Bell Media announced Discovery Channel Canada's first original scripted drama, the Jason Momoa-fronted Netflix co-production Frontier, chronicling the North American fur trade. In 2018, the channel began to devote portions of its schedule to reruns of police procedural series such as Criminal Minds, CSI: NY, and NUMB3RS.

With the relaunch as USA Network, the network primarily airs general entertainment programming, including USA Network and Bell-owned library programs, films, and reality series (including factual series carried over from Discovery Channel such as Highway Thru Hell and Mayday, and competition series such as The Traitors).

USA Network also carries some live sports programming sublicensed from TSN (since 2015, all discretionary specialty channels have operated under unified license terms that no longer restrict the genres of programming they may air, and allows channels not licensed as a mainstream sports channel to devote up to 10% of their programming to live professional sports), including professional wrestling from All Elite Wrestling (AEW Collision) and WWE (WWE LFG and WWE Rivals; while USA Network has been the long-time cable home of WWE in the United States—currently airing SmackDown—rights to WWE's main programming moved from Rogers' Sportsnet to Netflix in 2025 as part of a global licensing agreement. These two series are commissioned and distributed by A+E Global Media as part of its partnership with WWE Studios), and coverage of the NASCAR O'Reilly Auto Parts Series beginning in the 2025 season.

=== Original series (as Discovery (past and present)) ===
- Against All Odds
- Acorn the Nature Nut
- Aerospace
- Airshow
- Alien Mysteries
- Beastly Countdown
- Beyond Invention
- Birth of a Sports Car
- Bitchin' Rides
- Blood, Sweat & Tools
- Blueprint for Disaster
- BBQ Pit Wars
- Breaking Point
- Break It Down
- Building the Biggest
- Building the Ultimate (UK: Five co-production)
- Canadian Geographic Presents
- Canada's Greatest Know-It-All
- Canada's Worst Driver (carried over to USA)
- Canada's Worst Handyman
- Cold Water Cowboys
- Cash Cab
- Combat School
- Connections
- Creepy Canada
- Criss Angel Mindfreak
- A Cut Above
- Daily Planet (formerly @discovery.ca) (cancelled in 2018 as the result of Bell Media layoffs)
- Dangerous Flights
- Doctor*Ology
- Don't Drive Here
- Eco-Challenge
- Exhibit A: Secrets of Forensic Science
- Factory Made
- Fat N' Furious: Rolling Thunder
- Flightpath
- Fool's Gold
- Forensic Factor
- Frontier
- Frontiers of Construction
- Great Canadian Parks
- Guinea Pig
- Heavy Rescue: 401 (carried over to USA)
- Highway Thru Hell (carried over to USA)
- High Tech Rednecks
- How Do They Do It? (UK Wag TV coproduction)
- How It's Made (carried over to USA)
- Insectia
- I Shouldn't Be Alive
- Jacked!
- Jade Fever
- Jetstream
- Junk Raiders
- Junk Raiders 2
- Last Car Standing
- Licence to Drill
- Licence to Drill: Louisiana
- Manufactured
- Mayday (carried over to USA)
- Mega Builders
- MegaSpeed
- Mega World
- Mean Machines (UK IWC Media coproduction)
- Mean Green Machines
- The Mightiest
- Mighty Planes
- Mighty Ships
- Mighty Trains
- Naked Science (UK Pioneer Productions coproduction)
- Nature of the Beast
- Never Ever Do This at Home
- On the Run
- Out in the Cold
- Patent Bending
- Pyros
- Qubit
- Risk Takers
- Rocket Science
- Sci Q
- Science To Go
- Star Racer
- Superships
- The Body Machine
- The Exodus Decoded
- The Sex Files
- The World's Strangest UFO Stories
- Ultimate Cars (UK IWC Media coproduction)
- Ultimate
- Vegas Rat Rods
- White Hot Winter
- What's That About?
- You Asked For It

=== Current USA Network programs ===
- 9-1-1: Nashville
- The Anonymous
- The Bridge: Australia
- Criminal Minds
- Expedition X
- CSI: NY
- ER
- Good Cop/Bad Cop
- High Potential
- Long Bright River
- Naked and Afraid
- NUMB3RS
- Monk
- Race to Survive: Alaska
- Rocky Mountain Wreckers
- Suits
- The Pitt
- The Rainmaker
- The Summit (Australia)
- The Rookie
- The Traitors (UK)
- The Traitors (United States)
- The Traitors Canada
- The Traitors NZ
- Timber Titans

=== Upcoming programs ===
- The Death Coast
- The Traitors Australia

=== Sports programming ===
- All Elite Wrestling
  - AEW Collision (2025–)
- WWE
  - WWE LFG (2025–)
  - WWE Rivals (2025–)
  - WWE's Greatest Moments (2025–)
- NASCAR
  - NASCAR Xfinity Series (2025–)

== See also ==
- USA Network
- Discovery Channel (American TV channel)
- The current Canadian iteration of Discovery, owned by Rogers Sports & Media
- Science Channel (American TV channel)
