= 1 Girl 5 Gays =

- Genre: Talk show
- Presented by: Lauren Collins (season 4-6); Aliya Jasmine Sovani (season 1-4)
- Country of origin: Canada
- No. of seasons: 6

Production
- Running time: 30 minutes (including commercials)

Original release
- Network: MTV Canada
- Release: October 14, 2009 – 2014

1 Girl 5 Gays, sometimes abbreviated as 1g5g, is a Canadian talk show that premiered on October 14, 2009, on MTV Canada. In October 2010, gay-interest sister network Logo in the US picked up the program, and started airing it in the United States. Aliya Jasmine Sovani was the host for the first three seasons and part of the fourth. Lauren Collins, known for her role as Paige Michalchuk on Degrassi, replaced Sovani as the host.

Out Magazine described the show as containing "frank, often curse-laced discussions about bareback sex, masturbation and one-night stands", and analogised it with "The View meets Dr. Ruth, only with hot gay men instead of menopausal madams".

== Format ==
In each episode, one heterosexual woman (or "one girl") — Aliya Jasmine Sovani from 2009 to 2013, and Lauren Collins from 2013 to 2014, sits down with five panelists (or "five gays"), usually gay men but occasionally lesbian women, to discuss 20 questions about love and sex. The "five gays" in each episode are a rotating panel, each having differing backgrounds and points of view. The fast-paced discussion explores serious themes as well as lighthearted topics dealing with romance and pleasure. The show also featured special episodes, such as a high school edition, HIV+ men, naked men, co-ed episodes featuring lesbians and gays at the same time and more.

At the end of the fourth season, the show presented two special episodes featuring 20 "gays" departing the show, as producers chose to begin season five with a new cast, who were introduced 30 September 2013. MTV Canada resumed airing episodes with the new cast and Collins on October 4, 2013, but as of February 2014, Logo had not yet begun airing the show's fifth season; the show's official Twitter feed noted on March 17, 2014, that Logo had opted not to continue airing episodes after the end of season four.

When the show aired during prime time, some segments were grayed out and muted, with a notice that the uncensored show would air later.

== Panelists ==
The rotating panel of gay men included Michael Yerxa, Alex Illest, Jean-Paul Bevilacqua, Juan Manuel Gonzalez Calcaneo, Jonathan Morton-Schuster, Matt Barker, Dean McArthur, Matt Santos, Philip Tetro, Ian Lynch, Andrew Edwards, Jake Mossop, Thomas Trafford, Ish, Jonathan Nathaniel, Gerry King, Simon Lysnes, Max Claude, Alex Brown, Jason Yantha, Dillon Scheenaard, JP Larocque, Rafay Agha, Gabriel Rojas, Jae MT, Kiel Hughes, Gaelan Love, Michael Lehman, Shawn Hitchins, Taylor James, Thomas Haskell, Chris Corsini, David Robert, Maurie Sherman, Ralph Rosario, Evan Ford, Brad Blaylock, Ryan Carter, Ibrahim Hasan, Scott Do, Matthew Agius, Micha Baltman, Anthony Berardinucci, Matt Sims, Perez Hilton, James Bar, Jeffrey Bowers, Brett Ashley, Chase Hutchinson, Jonathan D. Lovitz, Mitchell Boucher, Mike Germanotta, Jamie Gillingham, and Taurel Lorenz.

A smaller number of episodes featured a panel of lesbians, including Brittany Leigh, Christina Mac, Brittany Emmons, Courtney Jean Milner, Valerie Bosso, and Nicole DeLargie.

== Cancellation ==
The program's cancellation was announced in 2014, as part of significant staffing and production cutbacks at Bell Media.

In 2021 it was announced at Bell Media's upfronts that Crave would air 1 Queen 5 Queers, essentially a revival of 1 Girl 5 Gays with a new roster of LGBTQ panelists moderated by drag queen Brooke Lynn Hytes.
