= Benjamin the Elephant =

German animated children's television show

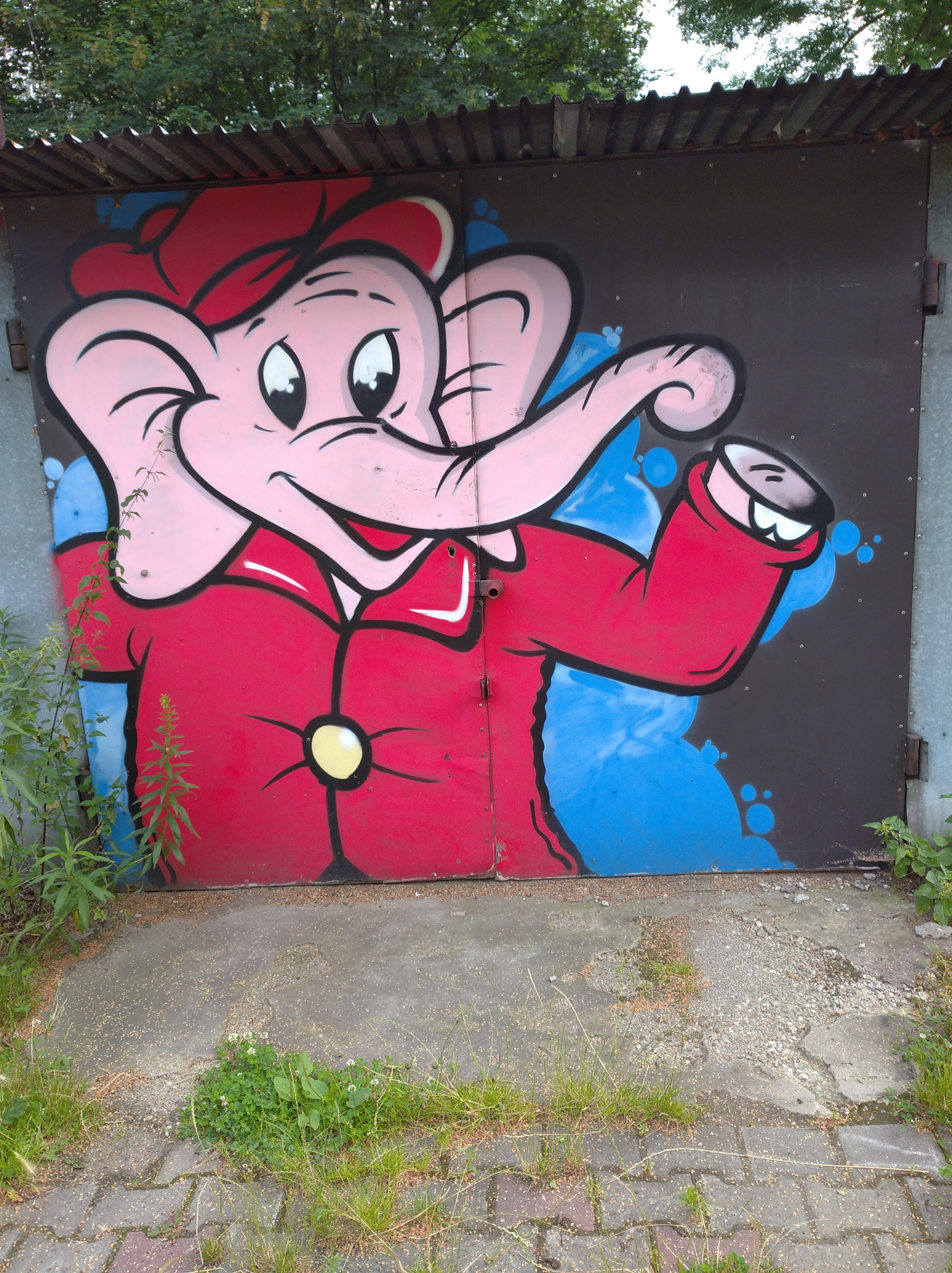
Benjamin the Elephant on a mural in Poland

Benjamin the Elephant (original German name: Benjamin Blümchen; "Benjamin Small Flower") (1988–2002) is an animated children's television show produced by Kiddinx Studios in Berlin. The show is based on audio stories by Elfie Donnelly. The audio series has been running since 1977 and has 142 stories as of 2019. On the show, the eponymous main character resides at the Newtown Zoo, with friends Otto and Stella. The adventures Benjamin gets involved in often require slipping into various roles, learning new jobs, or discovering new and distant places.

== Characters ==
- Benjamin - an African Elephant, is big and strong, cuddly and good-natured. He loves lazing around. But when something is going on around him, he is on his feet in a trice and ready to act. He is known for his unmistakable "Toroo!" call. He is very helpful and reliable. Benjamin's home is Neustadt Zoo, and the Zoo Director Herr Tierlieb, Karl the Keeper and all the animals are his family. His best friend of all is a boy named Otto. Benjamin spends nearly every afternoon with him and every weekend, and together they have many adventures. Voiced by Dave Pettitt (English) and Edgar Ott (until his death in 1994), Jürgen Kluckert (until his death in 2023) and Matti Klemm respectively (German).
- Otto - Benjamin's best friend. He is nice, polite, friendly and a very sensible boy. Since Otto knows a lot for a boy his age, he is able to explain things to Benjamin at times when he gets stuck. Otto visits Benjamin in the zoo just about every afternoon after school. They also spend nearly every weekend and the holidays together. From time to time, they even go on their travels together. Voiced by M.J. McCann (English) and Katja Primel (German).
- Stella Stellini - Otto's classmate and also a friend of Benjamin's. Stella is cheeky, energetic, adventurous and very sporty. Unlike Otto, Stella is very independent and often starts something on her own. When she is dealing with injustice or being headstrong, she often runs at brick walls. If Stella can't make any headway with a problem, or something goes wrong, then Benjamin and Otto are by her side to help out. Stella didn't make her first appearance until very late in the series.
- The Zoo Director, Herr Tierlieb - a good-natured, friendly elderly man. He lives and breathes his job as zoo director. Nothing is more important to him than the well-being of his animals. He is in charge of Neustadt Zoo and looks after all its inhabitants as if they were his children. It often troubles him that the zoo isn't making as much money as it should in order to provide food for all animals. The Zoo Director trusts Benjamin completely. If ever he needs his help, he is always able to count on his talking elephant. Voiced by Dean Galloway (English) and Hermann Wagner and Eric Vaessen respectively (German).
- Karl the Keeper - the zoo director's right hand, is well loved by all zoo animals. He looks after them with great love and care, keeps the enclosures in good repair, mends fences, fixes the heating when it breaks down and also orders the animal's food. Karl the Keeper loves his job. It is from Karl that Benjamin always finds out the latest news about the zoo and the animals. Voiced by Dan Gascon (English) and Til Hagen (German).
- Gulliver - the cheerful yet cheeky raven who thinks he knows everything and can do everything better than the others. The odd misfortune here or there does nothing to change his impetuous character. Gulliver only appears in the TV show, where he replaces the narrator. Voiced by David Lawrence Brown (English) and Wolfgang Ziffer (German).
- Karla Kolumna - Benjamin is friends with Karla Kolumna, a somewhat overexcitable reporter. Everyone in Neustadt knows her cheery "Hello there!" and her famous "Sensationnel!" ("Sensational!"). She is always on hand to help, especially when it's a matter of publicizing any scandals or injustices hatched by the Mayor of Neustadt. In such cases, Benjamin, Karla and Otto all work together. Voiced by Debbie Munro (English) and Gisela Fritsch (German).
- The Mayor - carries weight as Neustadt's premier citizen, as well as on his person. His name is Bruno Presssack (A Presssack is a German type of sausage.), but he is usually referred to as "the Mayor". He is rather vain and high-handed and is therefore often unjust. However, Benjamin, Otto and Karla always manage to make him change his attitude with their clever ideas. In the end, they find a fair solution for everything. Voiced by Doug de Nance (English) and Heinz Giese (German). After Giese's death, Roland Hemmo has been narrating him in the audio series since.
- Secretary Pichler - the Mayor's secretary. Although he always conforms to duty, he is a clever man with a sense of justice. When Benjamin and his friends are able to assert themselves against the Mayor, he is always secretly pleased. On a few occasions, he even secretly undermines the Mayor's plans. Voiced by Dean Galloway (English) and Wilfried Herbst (German).
- Baron Blunderbuss - a haughty aristocrat. He lives in a villa with enormous grounds right next to Newtown Zoo. The Baron has close contact to the Mayor and they support each other when it comes to promoting their interests. The Baron doesn't have much good to say about Benjamin the Elephant. His loud "Toroo!", which often reverberates around the zoo walls, disturb his peace and quiet. Voiced by Clark Robertson (English) and Friedrich G. Beckhaus (German).
- Hinky and Pinky - two crooks from Newtown. Hinky is tall and thin and a bit stupid, Pinky is fat and much cleverer. Wherever the pair appear, they are up to no good. But Benjamin and Otto are always on the spot and are able to get the pair arrested in the end. Voiced by Ben Jeffrey and Kevin Tokarsky (English) and Michael Pan and Andreas Mannkopff (German). In the audio series, Pinky has been narrated by Joachim Kaps since Mannkopff's death. Do not appear until very late in the series.
- Mr. Flatterer (?, Herr Schmeichler in the original) is a businessman in different professions (real estate, computer-selling, etc.; apparently he frequently runs down his businesses but always starts a new one). He uses flattery methods to trick people into deals, ranging sometimes to outright fraud (but not force). Usually among the villains of the story (much more so than the Mayor). Voiced by Klaus Miedel
- Otto's Mother - in the audio series, her name is revealed to be Ortrud.

== Book Series ==
- 1. Wo ist Winnie Waschbär? ("Where is Winnie Raccoon?")
- 2.

== Audio drama ==
- 1. Benjamin Blümchen als Wetterelefant ("Benjamin Blossom as Weather Elephant")
- 2. Benjamin Blümchen rettet den Zoo ("Benjamimn Blossom Saves the Zoo")
- 3. Benjamin Blümchen Kampf dem Lärm ("Benjamin Blossom Fight the Noise")
- 4. Benjamin Blümchen in Afrika ("Benjamin Blossom in Africa")
- 5. Benjamin Blümchen auf Hoher See ("Benjamin Blossom on the High Seas)"
- 6. Benjamin Blümchen und die Schule ("Benjamin Blossom and the School")
- 7. Benjamin Blümchen Verliebt Sich ("Benjamin Blossom Fall in Love")
- 8. Benjamin Blümchen auf dem Baum ("Benjamin Blossom on the Tree")
- 9. Benjamin Blümchen hat Geburtstag ("Benjamin Blossom has Birthday")
- 10. Benjamin Blümchen und das Schloss("Benjamin Blossom and the Castle")
- 11. Benjamin Blümchen auf dem Mond("Benjamin Blossom on the Moon")
- 12. Benjamin Blümchen als Briefträger ("Benjamin Blossom as a Postman")
- 13. Benjamin Blümchen im Krankenhaus ("Benjamin Blossom in the Hospital")
- 14. Benjamin Blümchen als Filmstar ("Benjamin Blossom as a Movie Star")
- 15. Benjamin Blümchen im Urlaub ("Benjamin Blossom on Holiday")
- 16. Benjamin Blümchen Träumt ("Benjamin Blossom Dreams")
- 17. Benjamin Blümchen Der Skiurlaub ("Benjamin Blossom the Ski Vacation")
- 18. Benjamin Blümchen als Schornsteinfeger ("Benjamin Blossom as a Chimney Sweep")
- 19. Benjamin Blümchen als Fussballstar("Benjamin Blossom as a Football Star")
- 20. Benjamin Blümchen und Bibi Blocksberg ("Benjamin Blossom and Bibi Blocksberg")
- 21. Benjamin Blümchen als Weihnachtsmann ("Benjamin Blossom as Santa Claus")
- 22. Benjamin Blümchen als Kinderarzt ("Benjamin Blossom as a Paediatrician")
- 23. Benjamin Blümchen als Koch ("Benjamin Blossom as a Cook")
- 24. Benjamin Blümchen als Detektiv ("Benjamin Blossom as a Detective")
- 25. Benjamin Blümchen auf Kreuzfahrt ("Benjamin Blossom on Cruise")
- 26. Benjamin Blümchen als Bademeister ("Benjamin Blossom as a Lifeguard")
- 27. Benjamin Blümchen auf dem Bauernhof ("Benjamin Blossom on the Farm")
- 28. Benjamin Blümchen Rettet den Kindergarten ("Benjamin Blossom Saves the Kindergarten")
- 29. Benjamin Blümchen auf dem Rummel ("Benjamin Blossom at the Fair")
- 30. Benjamin Blümchen als Pilot ("Benjamin Blossom as a Pilot")
- 31. Benjamin Blümchen als Feuerwehrmann (" as a Firefighter")
- 32. Die Verkehrsschule ("The Traffic School")
- 33. Das Osterfest ("Easter")
- 34. Benjamin Blümchen als Lokomotivführer ("Benjamin Blossom as a Locomotive Driver")
- 35. Benjamin Blümchen hat Zahnweh ("Benjamin Blossom has Toothache")
- 36. Benjamin Blümchen wird Verhext ("Benjamin Blossom is Bewitched")
- 37. Der Gorilla ist Weg ("The Gorilla is Gone")
- 38. Der Zoo zieht Um ("The Zoo is Moving")
- 39. Benjamin Blümchen Kauft Ein ("Benjamin Blossom Buys")
- 40. Benjamin Blümchen Zieht Aus ("Benjamin Blossom Moves Out")
- 41. Benjamin Blümchen als Pirat ("Benjamin Blossom as a Pirate")
- 42. Benjamin Blümchen als Ritter ("Benjamin Blossom as a Knight")
- 43. Benjamin Blümchen und die Autorallye ("Benjamin Blossom and the Car Rally")
- 44. Benjamin Blümchen als Bäcker ("Benjamin Blossom as a Baker")
- 45. Benjamin Blümchen als Zirkusclown ("Benjamin Blossom as a Circus Clown")
- 46. Benjamin Blümchen ("Benjamin Blossom Helps the Animals")
- 47. Benjamin Blümchen als Gärtner ("Benjamin Blossom as a Gardener")
- 48. Benjamin Blümchen Kriegt ein Geschenk ("Benjamin Blossom Gets a Present")
- 49. Benjamin Blümchen als Müllmann ("Benjamin Blossom as a Garbage Man")
- 50. Benjamin Blümchen als Sheriff ("Benjamin Blossom as Sheriff")
- 51. Der Weihnachtsabend ("The Christmas Eve")
- 52. Der Weihnachtstraum ("The Christmas Dream")
- 53. Benjamin Blümchen Wird Reich ("Benjamin Blossom Gets Rich")
- 54. Benjamin Blümchen ist Krank ("Benjamin Blossom is Sick")
- 55. Benjamin Blümchen und die Astrofanten ("Benjamin Blossom and the Astrophants")
- 56. Benjamin Blümchen als Reporter ("Benjamin Blossom as a Reporter")
- 57. Benjamin Blümchen als Bürgermeister ("Benjamin Blossom as Mayor")
- 58. Die Wünschelrute (The Divining Rod")
- 59. Benjamin Blümchen Findet einen Schatz ("Benjamin Blossom Finds a Treasure")
- 60. Der Doppelgänger ("The Lookalike")
- 61. Otto ist Krank ("Otto is Ill")
- 62. Benjamin Blümchen in der Steinzeit ("Benjamin Blossom in the Stone Age")
- 63. Der Computer ("The Computer")
- 64. Benjamin Blümchen als Butler ("Benjamin Blossom as a Butler")
- 65. Wo ist Otto? ("Where is Otto")
- 66. Benjamin Blümchen als Ballonfahrer ("Benjamin Blossom as a Balloonist")
- 67. Meine Schönsten Lieder ("My Most Beautiful Songs")
- 68. Benjamin Blümchen als Taxifahrer ("Benjamin Blossom as a Taxi Driver")
- 69. Benjamin Blümchen als Zoodirektor ("Benjamin Blossom as a Zoo Director")
- 70. Benjamin Blümchen und Bibi in Indien ("Benjamin Blossom and Bibi in India")
- 71. Alle Meine Freunde ("All My Friends")
- 72. Benjamin Blümchen und Bino ("Benjamin Blossom and Bino")
- 73. Benjamin Blümchen und der Weihnachtsmann ("Benjamin Blossom and Santa Claus")
- 74. Benjamin Blümchen Singt Weihnachtslieder ("Benjamin Blossom Sings Christmas Carols")
- 75. Der Geheimnisvolle Brief ("The Mysterious Letter")
- 76. Benjamin Blümchen als Förster ("Benjamin Blossom as a Forester")
- 77. Benjamin Blümchen und die Eisprinzessin ("Benjamin Blossom and the Ice Princess")
- 78. Benjamin Blümchen und der Kleine Hund ("Benjamin Blossom and the Little Dog")
- 79. Die Zirkuslöwen ("The Circus Lions")
- 80. Die Neue Zooheizung ("The New Zoo Heater")
- 81. Das Geheimnis der Templkatze ("The Secret of the Temple Cat")
- 82. Der Weisse Elefant ("The White Elephant")
- 83. Benjamin Blümchen als Gespenst ("Benjamin Blossom as a Ghost")
- 84. Der Kleine Ausreisser ("The Little Outlier")
- 85. Benjamin Blümchen als Tierarzt ("Benjamin Blossom as a Veterinarian")
- 86. Das Nilpferdbaby ("The Hippopotamus Baby")
- 87. Das Laternenfest ("The Lantern Festival")
- 88. Benjamin Blümchen als Cowboy ("Benjamin Blossom as a Cowboy")
- 89. Der Rote Luftballon ("The Red Balloon")
- 90. Das Zoojubiläum ("The Zoo Anniversary")
- 91. Benjamin Blümchen als Leuchtturmwätrter ("Benjamin Blossom as a Lighthouse Keeper")
- 92. Benjamin Blümchen bei den Eskimos ("Benjamin Blossom with the Eskimos")
- 93. Das Walbaby ("The Whale Baby")
- 94. Der Streichelzoo ("The Petting Zoo")
- 95. Die Wunderblume ("The Miracle Flower")
- 96. Der Bananendieb ("The Banana Thief")
- 97. Die Gespensterkinder ("The Ghost Children")
- 98. Benjamin Blümchen und die Murmeltiere ("Benjamin Blossom and the Marmots")
- 99. Der Geheimgang ("The Secret Passage")
- 100. Ottos Neue Freundin, Teil 1 ("Otto's New Girlfriend, Part 1")
- 101. Ottos Neue Freundin, Teil 2 ("Otto's New Girlfriend, Part 2")
- 102. Das Penguin-El ("The Penguin Egg")
- 103. 5:0 Für Benjamin ("5-0 for Benjamin")
- 104. Die Zoo-Olympiade ("The Zoo Olympiad")
- 105. Das Fleissige Faultier ("The Hard-Working Sloth")
- 106. Das Spaghetti-Eis-Fest ("The Spaghetti Ice Cream Feast")
- 107. Benjamin Blümchen in Schottland ("Benjamin Blossom in Scotland")
- 108. Ottos Kleines Geheimnis ("Otto's Little Secret")
- 109. Benjamin Blümchen als Baggerfahrer ("Benjamin Blossom as a Digger Driver")
- 110. Hilfe für das Pandababy ("Help for the Panda Baby")
- 111. Sei Nicht Traurig, Benjamin! ("Do Not Be Sad, Benjamin!")
- 112. Die Elefantenkönigin ("The Elephant Queen")

== Animated Series ==
- Season 1 (1988) (This series does not have an English dub equivalent and is in German only)
  - 1. Das Zookonzert ("The Zoo Concert")
  - 2. Benjamin Blümchen auf hoher See ("Benjamin on the High Sea")
  - 3. Benjamin Blümchen als Detektiv ("Benjamin the Detective")
  - 4. Benjamin Blümchen als Feuerwehrmann ("Benjamin the Firefighter")
  - 5. Benjamin Blümchen und Bibi Blocksberg ("Benjamin and Bibi Blocksberg")
  - 6. Benjamin Blümchen als Ritter ("Benjamin Blossom as a knight")
  - 7. Benjamin Blümchen in der Steinzeit ("Benjamin in the Stone Age")
  - 8. Benjamin Blümchen als Koch ("Benjamin the Chef")
  - 9. Benjamin Blümchen als Butler ("Benjamin the Butler")
  - 10. Wo ist Otto? ("Where Is Otto?")
  - 11. Benjamin Blümchen als Ballonfahrer ("Benjamin the Balloonist")
  - 12. Benjamin Blümchen als Taxifahrer ("Benjamin the Taxi Driver")
  - 13. Benjamin Blümchen auf dem Bauernhof ("Benjamin in the Farm Yard")
  - 14. Benjamin Blümchen und der Weihnachtsmann ("Benjamin and Santa Claus")
  - 15. Benjamin Blümchen und die Eisprinzessin ("Benjamin and the Ice Princess")
  - 16. Die Zirkuslöwen ("The Circus Lions")
  - 17. Das Geheimnis der Tempelkatze ("The Secret of the Temple Cat")
- Season 2 (2002)
  - 1. Das Zoofest ("The Zoo Festival")
  - 2. Benjamin Blümchen als Tierarzt ("Benjamin the Veterinarian")
  - 3. Benjamin Blümchen als Wetterelefant ("Benjamin the Weather Elephant")
  - 4. Benjamin Blümchen als Förster ("Benjamin the Forest Ranger")
  - 5. Der kleine Ausreisser ("The Little Runaway")
  - 6. Benjamin Blümchen als Gespenst ("Benjamin the Ghost")
  - 7. Das Nilpferdbaby ("The Baby Hippo")
  - 8. Benjamin Blümchen als Leuchtturmwärter ("Benjamin the Lighthouse Keeper")
  - 9. Das weiße Nashorn ("The White Rhinoceros")
  - 10. Die Gespensterkinder ("The Little Ghosts")
  - 11. Der Bananendieb ("The Banana Thief")
  - 12. Das rosarote Auto ("The Pink Car")
  - 13. Benjamin Blümchen rettet die Biber ("Benjamin Saves the Beavers")
  - 14. Die Wunderblume ("The Magic Flower")
  - 15. Die Eichhörnchenbande ("The Squirrel Gang")
  - 16. Benjamin Blümchen als Gärtner ("Benjamin the Gardener")
  - 17. Benjamin Blümchen und die blauen Elefanten ("Benjamin and the Blue Elephants")
  - 18. Der Streichelzoo ("The Petting Zoo")
  - 19. Benjamin Blümchen und die Eisbär-Babys ("Benjamin and the Polar Bear Babies")
  - 20. Das Regenbogenfest ("The Rainbow Festival")
  - 21. Das goldene Ei ("The Golden Egg")
  - 22. Benjamin Blümchen und der kleine Hund ("Benjamin and the Little Dog")
  - 23. Das Walbaby ("The Baby Whale")
  - 24. Benjamin Blümchen im Krankenhaus ("Benjamin in the Hospital")
  - 25. Benjamin Blümchen und die Geisterbahn ("Benjamin and the Ghost Train")
  - 26. Benjamin Blümchen als Cowboy ("Benjamin the Cowboy")
- Season 3 (2003)
  - 1. Benjamin Blümchen hat Geburstag ("Benjamin's Birthday")
  - 2. Benjamin Blümchen als Nachtwächter ("Benjamin the Nightwatchman")
  - 3. Benjamin Blümchen als Babysitter ("Benjamin the Babysitter")
  - 4. Benjamin Blümchen und Billi Ballo ("Benjamin and Billy Ballo")
  - 5. Der kleine Flaschengeist ("The Little Genie")
  - 6. Der schwarze Kater ("The Black Cat")
  - 7. Benjamin Blümchen und der Zauberzirkus ("Benjamin and the Magic Circus")
  - 8. Benjamin Blümchen findet einen Schatz ("Benjamin Finds a Treasure")
  - 9. Der Gorilla ist weg ("Where Is the Gorilla?")
  - 10. Der Schatz in der Mühle ("The Treasure in the Mill")
  - 11. Benjamin Blümchen und die Hüpfburg ("Benjamin and the Bouncy Castle")
  - 12. Benjamin Blümchen als Kinderarzt ("Benjamin the Paediatrician")
  - 13. Die kleinen Schildkröten ("The Little Tortoises")
  - 14. Benjamin Blümchen als Superelefant ("Benjamin the Superelephant")
  - 15. Benjamin Blümchen und die Murmeltiere ("Benjamin and the Marmots")
  - 16. Der Geheimgang ("The Secret Passage")
  - 17. Benjamin Blümchen als Lokomotivführer ("Benjamin the Engine Driver")
  - 18. Ein Freund für Winni Waschbär ("A Friend for Rocky Raccoon")
  - 19. Benjamin Blümchen im Eismeer ("Benjamin in the Arctic Ocean")
  - 20. Der Erdbeereis-Roboter ("The Strawberry Ice Cream Robot")
  - 21. Das Giraffenhaus ("The Giraffe House")
  - 22. Das Laternenfest ("The Lantern Festival")
  - 23. Benjamin Blümchen in Indien ("Benjamin in India")
  - 24. Benjamin Blümchen verliebt sich ("Benjamin Falls in Love")
  - 25. Benjamin Blümchen bei den Eskimos ("The Polar Adventure")
  - 26. Diebstahl im Zoo ("Thieves in the Zoo")

== Film ==
- Benjamin Blümchen (2019)

== In popular culture ==
- Benjamin is referenced in the German dub of the SpongeBob SquarePants episode “Born Again Krabs.” In the original English, Mr. Krabs gives his name as “Harold Flower” in order to avoid having his soul stolen by the Flying Dutchman; in German, this is changed to Benjamin Blümchen, both because “Blümchen” is a derivative of the German for “flower,” and because Mr. Krabs was at the time portrayed in the dub by Benjamin’s voice actor, Jürgen Kluckert.
