= Brian Walker (toy inventor) =

American toy inventor

Brian Walker (May 30, 1956 - February 15, 2025) was a toy inventor from Bend, Oregon known for attempting to build his own rocket and as the inventor of several toys, namely the air bazooka and light chaser (spinning light-up toy).

His rocket was known as Project R.U.S.H., which stands for Rapid Up Super High. It was intended to be fueled by hydrogen peroxide and equipped with parachutes for use when landing. The goal of the project was to launch Walker 50 miles into the sky. He wanted to launch 20 miles in a rocket-propelled aircraft from the world's largest crossbow., but in a 2015 interview, he said that he is no longer looking to launch himself skyward.

Walker had been interviewed by several media personalities, including Art Bell on his radio show Coast to Coast AM, and novelist Chuck Palahniuk, who included his interview with Walker in his book Stranger Than Fiction: True Stories.

For many years he documented his inventions and adventures on rocketguy.com

He started posting videos to his YouTube channel in 2009.

He wrote an autobiography called The Chronicles of Mania that covers his life, inventions, and struggles with bipolar disorder.

He died on February 15, 2025

== Sources ==
- http://interviews.slashdot.org/interviews/02/07/12/1410203.shtml?tid=160
- Palahniuk, Chuck. Stranger Than Fiction : True Stories. Doubleday, 2004. ISBN 0-385-50448-9
- When Rocket Guy Dreams (St. Petersburg Times, September 2000)
- Interview with Art Bell March 27, 2002
