= Aliya Jasmine Sovani =

Canadian television producer

- Born: 18 November 1981 (age 44)
- Education: University of Ottawa BA
- Occupations: Broadcaster; Journalist

Aliya Jasmine "AJ" Sovani (born November 18, 1981) is a Canadian television broadcaster and producer, initially known for her work on MTV Canada. She is currently working as an environmental journalist, most recently for NBC's Los Angeles station KNBC.

== Career ==
Before working at MTV, Sovani was a producer at MuchMusic, and has worked in front of and behind the camera at BPM:TV, Star!, and FashionTelevision as well as a freelance writer and professional speaker. She also worked as the Whistler Reporter for CTV's Olympic Morning show during the 2010 Winter Olympic Games in Vancouver, British Columbia, Canada.

Over the past decade, Sovani has been a reporter at the Vancouver Winter Olympics for CTV's Olympic Morning show, was on the ground in Haiti for Discovery Channel after the 2010 Haiti earthquake, was an NHL playoffs reporter for the NHL Network and co-hosted the red carpet program for TSN at the 2013 ESPY Awards with Cabbie Richards. She was on one seven on-air personalities that launched MTV Canada in 2006 and appeared regularly on the flagship show MTV Live. She soon expanded her role and was involved with several other programs on the network. She is best known for having produced & hosted her on sports/pop culture series on MTV called Play with AJ. She also anchored MTV News, was a regularly contributor to MTV Movie Night and hosted the talk show 1 Girl 5 Gays (a.k.a. "1g5g") on MTV Canada. She also helped produce the show IMPACT, a show that dealt with social and environmental issues.

In 2022, she was co-host with Teddy Wilson of the documentary series The Mightiest for Discovery Channel Canada.

== Personal life ==
Sovani was born on November 18, 1981, in Ottawa, Ontario. Her parents are African-Indians originally from Uganda.

She received international attention from various media outlets including The View, The Huffington Post, and Good Morning America for a breast cancer awareness video she wrote, and directed that went viral called "Save the Boobs".

In 2010, she was selected as one of HELLO! Magazine's 50 most beautiful Canadians and the National Post newspaper's "Worthy-30 to watch" lists.

She has her Social Media & Digital Marketing certificate from Harvard University, and her BA degree in Broadcast Communications from the University of Ottawa. She also has a Masters in Environmental Journalism from the University of South Carolina.

In 2020, Sovani married Mike Bradwell, former wide receiver for the Toronto Argonauts of the Canadian Football League, at the Sasaab resort in Kenya.
