= The Sex Files =

Canadian documentary television series

The Sex Files is a television program broadcasting on Discovery Channel Canada and was broadcast on CTV network stations after the watershed, due to its highly explicit discussion of the nature of sexuality issues and behavior, from genetics, reproduction, sexual orientation, puberty, etc. As one would expect of a show of its nature, it frequently featured nudity, but portrayed in a scientific manner for visual aid in learning, highly beneficial information on sexuality and the biology behind it. In Europe the show was called Sex Sense and featured a male narrator. The number of episodes and their titles were the same, but the episodes themselves were slightly different as the more explicit scenes were replaced. It aired on Discovery Channel Europe.

Starting with episode 41 (season 4), it is broadcast in high-definition.

== The Sex Files episode list ==
=== Season 1 ===
1. The Erection
2. Breasts
3. Orgasm
4. The Birds and the Bees
5. Aphrodisiacs
6. Fantasy
7. The Affair
8. Fetish
9. Gender
10. Hair
11. What is Sexy?
12. Girl Power
13. Birth Control

=== Season 2 ===
1. Sex Drive
2. The Act
3. The Vagina
4. Sexual Signals
5. Sexual Senses
6. Sex for One
7. Puberty
8. Homosexuality
9. The Rear End
10. Sexual Cycle
11. Love Juices
12. Circumcision
13. Intersexed People
14. Myths

=== Season 3 ===
1. Testicles
2. Celibacy
3. Behavioral addiction
4. Better Sex
5. Sexual Reconstruction
6. Menopause
7. Future Sex
8. Sex & Culture
9. Sex & Disabilities
10. Sex vs. Love
11. Healing Sex
12. Pregnancy
13. Sexpertise

=== Season 4 ===
1. Sex Toys
2. Kinky Sex
3. Rated X
4. Beyond Monogamy
5. Pleasure and Pain
6. The Kiss
7. The Strip
8. The Bi Way
9. Baring it All
10. No Sex Please
11. Dirty Jokes
12. Makin' it Work
13. More Kinky Sex

=== Season 5 ===
1. First Date
2. Sun, Sand and Sex
3. The Boob Tube
4. Top Ten Sexiest Clothes
5. The Love Glove
6. Top Ten Sexy Things
7. Sexercise
8. Top Ten Sexual Fantasies
9. Erotic Origins
10. His Sexy Makeover
11. Her Sexy Makeover
12. The Wedding
13. Making of the Sex Files

=== Season 6 ===
1. Virginity
2. Marriage Makeover
3. The Brothel
4. Breasts
5. Sex and Beauty
6. Girls on Top
7. Sex and Aging
8. Top Ten Myths
9. Touch
10. Sex and Rock n' Roll
11. Satisfaction
12. Top Ten Archetypes
13. Sextracurricular Activities

== Sexual Secrets ==
Sexual Secrets uses footage from The Sex Files, with contents rearranged to 1-hour episodes. Sexual Secrets was premiered on Life Network and Discovery Health. Episodes 1-18 use footage from first three seasons of The Sex Files. High-definition episodes are available starting with episode 19, which corresponds to the fourth and later seasons of The Sex Files.

=== Sexual Secrets episode list ===
1. Pleasure Zones (09/27/2002)
2. Love Potions (10/04/2002)
3. Sex Appeal (09/20/2002)to
4. Sex Drive (09/27/2002)
5. Forbidden Fruit (10/04/2002)
6. The Mating Game (11/21/2003)
7. Love Juices (10/18/2002)
8. Doing It Right (11/01/2002)
9. Love Triangles (11/08/2002)
10. The Body Beautiful (11/08/2002)
11. Sex 101 (04/25/2003)
12. Cheeky Secrets (04/25/2003)
13. Ultimate Sex (04/11/2003)
14. Sex, Lies and Abstinence
15. Constant Cravings (05/02/2003)
16. Designer Sex (05/16/2003)
17. Sexpecting (05/23/2003)
18. Prescription: Sex (05/30/2003)
19. Bi Now, Tri Later
20. Dating Secrets (03/05/2005)
21. Wild and Whipped
22. Kinky Secrets
23. Ultimate Makeover
24. Adults Only
25. Beach Bums
26. Ultimate Sex List (12/31/2004)
27. Under the Hood, and down the drain.
28. Put It On, Turn It On (02/26/2005)
29. Sex Ed for Grownups (04/14/2006)
30. Sex, Lies and Myth (04/21/2006)
31. Aged to Satisfaction (04/28/2006)
32. Rock n’ Roll in the Hay (5/05/2006)
33. Alpha Dames: Sex, Sass and Secrets (05/12/2006)
34. Beauty and the Breast (5/19/2006)
35. Pure and not so Simple (05/26/2006)
36. Sexy Marriage Makeover: From Hot to Not (06/02/2006)
