= WWE Rivals =

2022 American television series

- Poster for Season 2
- Genre: Documentary
- Presented by: Freddie Prinze Jr. (seasons 1–3); Gabriel Iglesias (season 4–present)
- Country of origin: United States
- Original language: English
- No. of seasons: 5
- No. of episodes: 42 (list of episodes)

Production
- Executive producers: Vince McMahon (season 1); Kevin Dunn (seasons 1-2); Paul "Triple H" Levesque (season 2 onwards); Lee Fitting (season 3 onwards); Chris Kaiser; Elaine Frontain Bryant; Brad Abramson; Jonathan Partridge
- Running time: 43 minutes
- Production company: WWE

Original release
- Network: A&E
- Release: July 10, 2022 – present

WWE Rivals, or simply Rivals, is a professional wrestling documentary series produced by WWE Studios. The series premiered on A&E on July 10, 2022.

== Premise ==
The series features round table discussions discussing the most iconic rivalries in WWE, featuring WWE performers, alumni, and Hall of Fame talent.

Most of the episodes in Season 1 tie into the wrestler who was also the featured subject in the first season of Biography: WWE Legends.

== Recurring Panelists ==
- John "Bradshaw" Layfield
- Natalya
- Kofi Kingston (seasons 1 & 4–5)
- Kevin Nash
- Tamina Snuka (season 1)
- Cody Rhodes
- Beth Phoenix (seasons 1–3)
- Sean Waltman (seasons 1 & 4–present)
- Bayley (seasons 1–3)
- Johnny Gargano (seasons 2–3)
- Renee Paquette (seasons 2–3)
- Booker T (seasons 2–3)
- D-Von Dudley (seasons 2–3)
- Kevin Owens (season 3–present)

== Series overview ==
| Season | Episodes | Originally released | |
| Season | Episodes | First released | Last released |
|---|---|---|---|
| 1 | 9 | July 10, 2022 | September 4, 2022 |
| 2 | 10 | February 19, 2023 | April 23, 2023 |
| 3 | 6 | February 25, 2024 | March 31, 2024 |
| 4 | 6 | April 21, 2024 | May 19, 2024 |
| 5 | 11 | February 16, 2025 | May 24, 2026 |

== Episode list ==
=== Season 1 (2022) ===
| No. overall | No. in season | Title | Original release date |
|---|---|---|---|
| 1 | 1 | "Shawn Michaels vs. Bret Hart" | July 10, 2022 |
| 2 | 2 | "The Undertaker vs. Kane" | July 17, 2022 |
| 3 | 3 | "Stone Cold Steve Austin vs. The Rock" | July 24, 2022 |
| 4 | 4 | "Brock Lesnar vs. Kurt Angle" | July 31, 2022 |
| 5 | 5 | "WWE vs. WCW" | August 7, 2022 |
| 6 | 6 | "Triple H vs. Mick Foley" | August 14, 2022 |
| 7 | 7 | "John Cena vs. Edge" | August 21, 2022 |
| 8 | 8 | "Rey Mysterio vs. Eddie Guerrero" | August 28, 2022 |
| 9 | 9 | "Stephanie McMahon vs. Brie Bella" | September 4, 2022 |

=== Season 2 (2023) ===
| No. overall | No. in season | Title | Original release date |
|---|---|---|---|
| 10 | 1 | "Hulk Hogan vs. Andre the Giant" | February 19, 2023 |
| 11 | 2 | "The Undertaker vs. Mankind" | February 26, 2023 |
| 12 | 3 | "The Rock vs. John Cena" | March 5, 2023 |
| 13 | 4 | "Triple H vs. Batista" | March 12, 2023 |
| 14 | 5 | "Trish Stratus vs. Lita" | March 19, 2023 |
| 15 | 6 | "Brock Lesnar vs. Roman Reigns" | March 26, 2023 |
| 16 | 7 | "The Undertaker vs. Randy Orton" | April 9, 2023 |
| 17 | 8 | "Hulk Hogan vs. "Rowdy" Roddy Piper" | April 16, 2023 |
| 18 | 9 | "Stone Cold Steve Austin vs. Bret Hart" | April 23, 2023 |
| 19 | 10 | "Stone Cold Steve Austin vs. Shawn Michaels" | April 23, 2023 |

=== Season 3 (2024) ===
| No. overall | No. in season | Title | Original release date |
|---|---|---|---|
| 20 | 1 | "Triple H vs. The Rock" | February 25, 2024 |
| 21 | 2 | "Jake Roberts vs. Randy Savage" | March 3, 2024 |
| 22 | 3 | "Shawn Michaels vs. The Undertaker" | March 10, 2024 |
| 23 | 4 | "John Cena vs. Randy Orton" | March 17, 2024 |
| 24 | 5 | "The Hardy Boyz vs. The Dudley Boyz vs. Edge & Christian" | March 24, 2024 |
| 25 | 6 | "The Miz vs. Daniel Bryan" | March 31, 2024 |

=== Season 4 (2024) ===
| No. overall | No. in season | Title | Original release date |
|---|---|---|---|
| 26 | 1 | "Hulk Hogan vs. Randy Savage" | April 21, 2024 |
| 27 | 2 | "Stone Cold Steve Austin vs. Booker T" | April 28, 2024 |
| 28 | 3 | "John Cena vs. Batista" | May 5, 2024 |
| 29 | 4 | "Triple H vs. Seth Rollins" | May 12, 2024 |
| 30 | 5 | "Ric Flair vs. Dusty Rhodes" | May 12, 2024 |
| 31 | 6 | "Hulk Hogan vs. The Rock" | May 19, 2024 |

=== Season 5 (2025–26) ===
| No. overall | No. in season | Title | Original release date |
|---|---|---|---|
| 32 | 1 | "Stone Cold Steve Austin vs. The Undertaker" | February 16, 2025 |
| 33 | 2 | ""Rowdy" Roddy Piper vs. Mr. T" | February 23, 2025 |
| 34 | 3 | "Hulk Hogan vs. Ultimate Warrior" | March 2, 2025 |
| 35 | 4 | "Triple H vs. Shawn Michaels" | March 9, 2025 |
| 36 | 5 | "The Rock vs. Mick Foley" | March 16, 2025 |
| 37 | 6 | "Ric Flair vs. Ricky "The Dragon" Steamboat" | March 23, 2025 |
| 38 | 7 | "Shawn Michaels vs. Scott Hall" | March 30, 2025 |
| 39 | 8 | "The Undertaker vs. Triple H" | April 6, 2025 |
| 40 | 9 | "Roman Reigns vs. Seth Rollins" | April 13, 2025 |
| 41 | 10 | "Ric Flair vs. Randy Savage" | May 24, 2026 |
| 42 | 11 | "Charlotte Flair vs. Becky Lynch" | May 24, 2026 |
