= Jonathan Lovitz =

American political figure (born 1984)

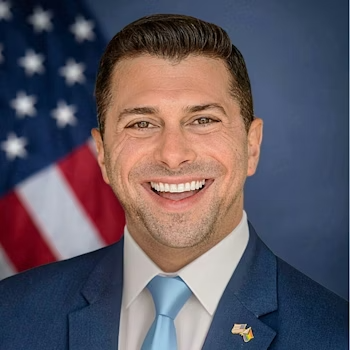
- Lovitz in 2023 at US Department of Commerce
- Born: July 19, 1984 (age 42); Atlantic City, New Jersey
- Education: University of Florida
- Organization: Human Rights Campaign
- Title: Senior Vice President, Campaigns & Communications
- Movement: LGBT rights movement
- Spouse: Steven Sosna

Jonathan D. Lovitz (born July 19, 1984) is an American communications and policy advocate, former actor, and senior executive.

== Early life and education ==
Lovitz was born in Atlantic City to a Jewish family and grew up in southern Florida, attending Broward County Public Schools. During this time he also attended Stagedoor Manor, a performing arts summer camp. He graduated Summa Cum Laude from the University of Florida in 2006.

== Performance career ==
Lovitz performed in the national touring productions of Joseph and the Amazing Technicolor Dreamcoat and Jesus Christ Superstar from 2006 to 2008. After moving to New York City in 2008, Lovitz worked in regional theaters and began taking small roles on television. In 2011 Lovitz joined Logo TV as an on-air correspondaent for CBS News on Logo, as well as one of the hosts of Setup Squad.

== Public service and advocacy career ==
Lovitz joined the National LGBT Chamber of Commerce in 2015 as Vice President of External Affairs and Director of nglccNY; he has served as Senior Vice President since 2016. At the NGLCC, Lovitz oversaw media relations and public policy initiatives focused on the LGBTQ business community. As head of the NGLCC advocacy division, he led the efforts to write, lobby for, and implement policies for the inclusion of certified of LGBTQ and other minority-owned businesses in the public sector, including in the State of New Jersey; Los Angeles, CA; Chicago, IL; Miami, FL; Orlando, FL; Nashville, TN; Baltimore, MD; Seattle, WA; and Jersey City, NJ.

In 2022, Lovitz ran for the Pennsylvania House of Representatives in the 182nd district, representing Center City Philadelphia.

In February 2023, President Joe Biden appointed Lovitz as Director of Public Affairs & Senior Advisor at the US Economic Development Administration within the US Department of Commerce. He led communications and public policy strategy to implement the agenda of Commerce Secretary Gina Raimondo and Assistant Secretary Alejandra Y. Castillo.

In 2025, Lovitz joined the Human Rights Campaign as Senior Vice President of Public Affairs & Engagement, overseeing media relations, public policy communications, and political engagement campaigns.

== Personal life ==
Lovitz lives in Washington, DC with his husband, CBS News meteorologist Steven Sosna. The two were married in New York City in October 2017 in a ceremony officiated by Jim Obergefell, Supreme Court marriage equality plaintiff in the landmark Obergefell v. Hodges case.

Out Magazine named Lovitz to the 2023 OUT 100 List of "artists, disruptors, educators, groundbreakers, innovators, and storytellers who all helped make the world a better place for LGBTQ+ people."

== Select filmography ==
Television
Year	Title	Role	Notes
2008	CSI: NY	Paralegal	(TV Series), 1 episode: "Page Turner"
2011	16th & 8th	Sam	(TV Series), 1 episode
2011	Setup Squad	Jonny	(TV Series), 10 episodes
2011	1 Girl 5 Gays	Self	(TV Series), 1 episode: "Episode #2.29"
2012	Broadway.TV	Host	(Web Series) 14 episodes
	Red Carpet Network	Host	(Web Series) 11 episodes
