= Orbis International =

U.S.-based international nonprofit organization

- Formation: 1982; 44 years ago
- Founded: 1982
- Founder: Albert Lee Ueltschi, Betsy Trippe DeVecci, Thomas Knight, David Paton
- Type: Non-profit organization
- Purpose: eliminating preventable blindness
- Headquarters: New York City, U.S.
- Region served: Worldwide (92 countries as of 2012)
- Board Chair: John Howitt
- President and CEO: Kathleen Sherwin
- Website: https://www.orbis.org

Orbis International is an international nonprofit organization which focuses on the prevention of blindness and the treatment of blinding eye diseases in developing countries through hands-on training, public health education, advocacy and local partnerships. Since 1982, Orbis capacity-building programs have enhanced the skills of 325,000 eye care personnel and provided medical and optical treatment to more than 23.3 million people in 92 countries.

Orbis is a registered 501(c)(3) tax-deductible non-profit charity in the United States. It was rated 4 stars on Charity Navigator in 2016 and was a Guidestar Gold Participant. It is headquartered in New York, with offices in Toronto, London, Dublin, Hong Kong, Macau, Shanghai, Singapore, Cape Town and Addis Ababa.

Orbis' programs emphasise skills, training and self-sufficiency. The organisation spends approximately a year planning and coordinating with partner hospitals and local organisations, making preliminary visits to observe the local medical teams. Its Flying Eye Hospital not only gives care to patients, but also provides training to local staff and delivers equipment and surgical supplies to ensure that local teams are able to continue to help people long after the plane has left the program site. Cybersight, Orbis' telemedicine program, continues the training and mentoring relationships. Orbis' intervention are tailored to local needs; Orbis trains local doctors in low-tech, low-cost yet effective methods to correct diseases of the eyes.

In addition to the Flying Eye Hospital, Orbis operates hospital-based programs in several countries and works with local medical research and health-care organizations on blindness prevention and eye disease treatment.

Orbis is a founding partner, along with the World Health Organization, of VISION 2020: The Right to Sight, "a worldwide concerted effort designed to eliminate avoidable blindness by the year 2020."

== History ==
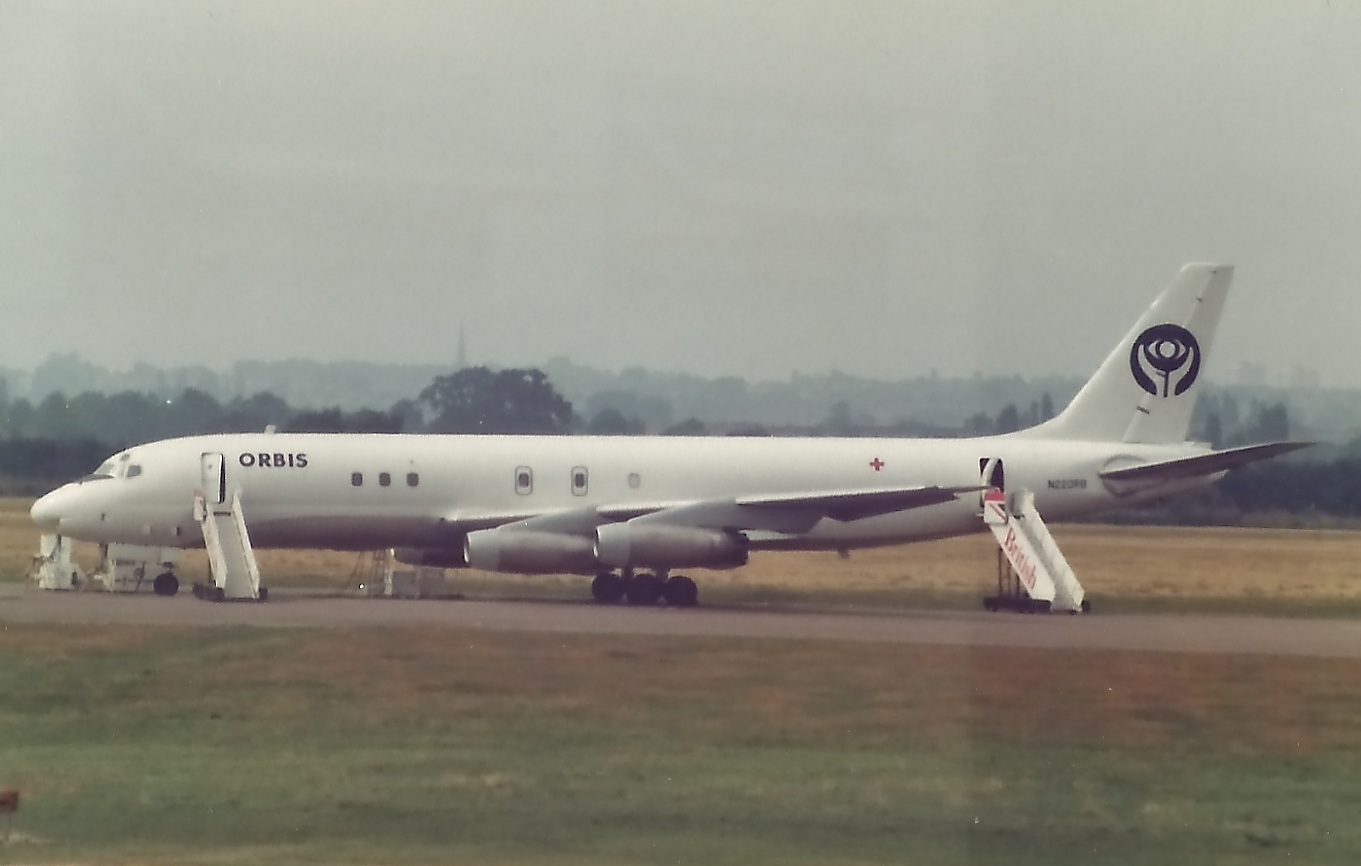
Orbis McDonnell Douglas DC-8-21 at Birmingham Airport, England

Orbis was founded in 1982 with a grant from the U.S. Agency for International Development (USAID) and a number of private donors. The first Flying Eye Hospital was a Douglas DC-8-21 (N220RB) donated by United Airlines. In its first two years of operation, the Orbis DC-8 visited countries and held programs emphasizing the hands-on transfer of surgical skills.

By the late 1980s, as replacement parts for the aging DC-8 became more difficult and expensive to obtain, it became clear that a newer, larger aircraft was needed. Funded by private donations, Orbis purchased a DC-10 in 1992. The DC-10 contained twice the interior space of the original DC-8. After two years of conversion and renovation, it was placed in service in 1994, and the DC-8 was retired and donated to Chinese Aviation Museum near Beijing, China. That summer, the new Flying Eye Hospital took off on its inaugural mission to Beijing.

In 1998, Orbis embarked on a new path based on the strategy to strengthen the capacity of local partners in the developing world to prevent and treat blindness through full-time, ongoing in-country programs. These programs were designed to respond to the needs of individual ophthalmic communities and local eye care providers. Orbis selected the first initial five countries to work in year round based on need (magnitude of blindness), opportunity (local infrastructure and resources), and safety & stability to operate in-country.

Orbis launched its first permanent country program in Ethiopia. Country programs in Bangladesh, China, India, Spain and Vietnam soon followed. In 2010 Orbis established a country program office in South Africa. Permanent Orbis offices in these countries, run by local staff, develop and implement an array of multi-year projects to improve the quality and accessibility of eye care to residents, particularly in rural area and impoverished urban communities. In addition to permanent country offices, Orbis also engages in long-term program work in countries in Latin America and the Caribbean as well is in countries including Nepal, Zambia, and Burkina Faso.

On April 7, 2008, Orbis announced it would replace the DC-10 Flying Eye Hospital with a DC-10 Series 30 freighter. United Airlines, with the support of FedEx, is donating the airplane to Orbis.

On August 8, 2011, FedEx announced that it would donate one of its DC-10-30s, retrofitted with the MD-10-30F upgrade, to Orbis to replace its DC-10-30F. The new MD-10 will feature a modular hospital suite, the first time these units will have been used on an aircraft.

== The Orbis Flying Eye Hospital ==
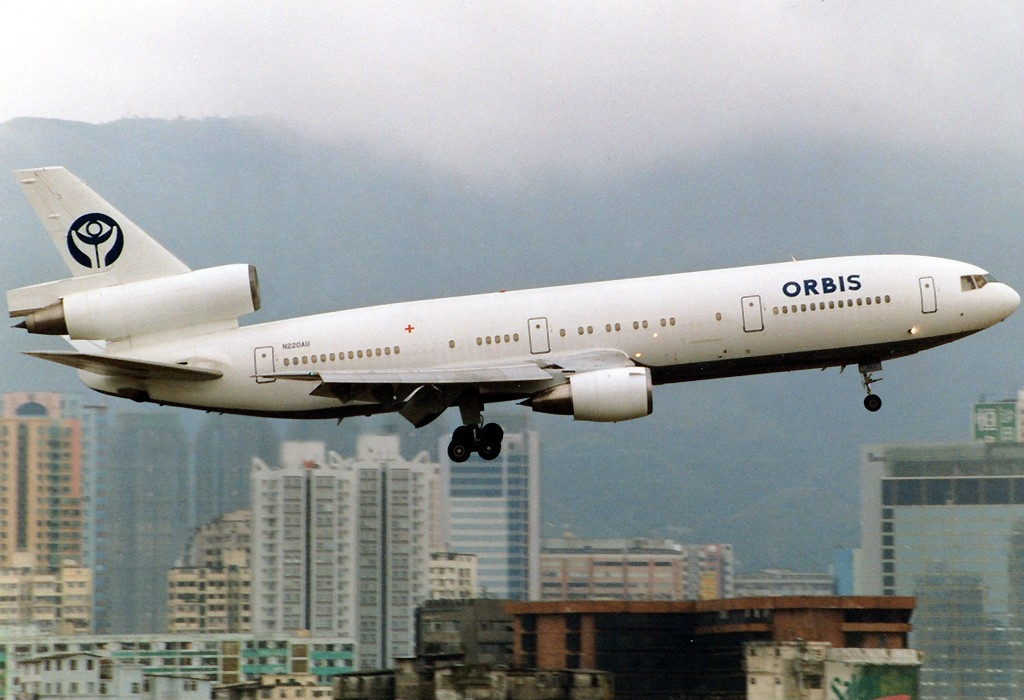
Orbis International McDonnell Douglas DC-10-10 at Hong Kong.

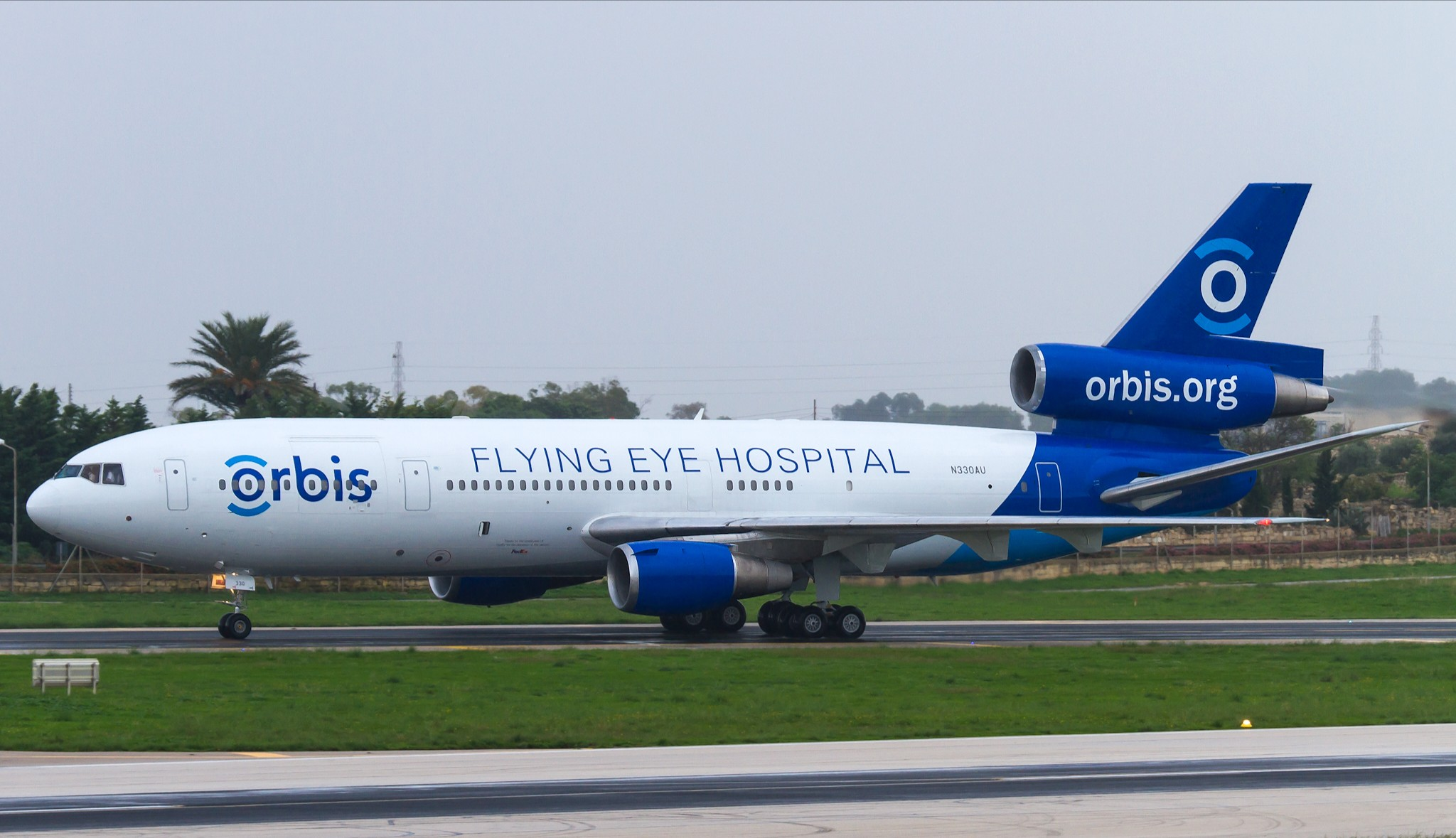
Orbis International McDonnell Douglas MD-10-30 at Malta International Airport, Malta

Orbis is well known for its "Flying Eye Hospital", an ophthalmic hospital and teaching facility located on board a McDonnell Douglas DC-10 aircraft. The Flying Eye Hospital brings training to doctors and nurses in developing countries with little access to professional development and training. Classrooms, operating theatres and laser rooms are aboard the aircraft and the local medical personnel are able to watch live surgeries as well as simulations. 3D filming and broadcast facilities allow the local ophthalmic professionals to observe the live surgeries through the eyes of the surgeon. Surgeries can also be broadcast to additional classes outside of the aircraft, be it a local hospital or halfway across the world. Participants can ask questions via a two-way audio-visual system. Volunteer pilots donate their time and skills to fly the hospital to the various program sites.

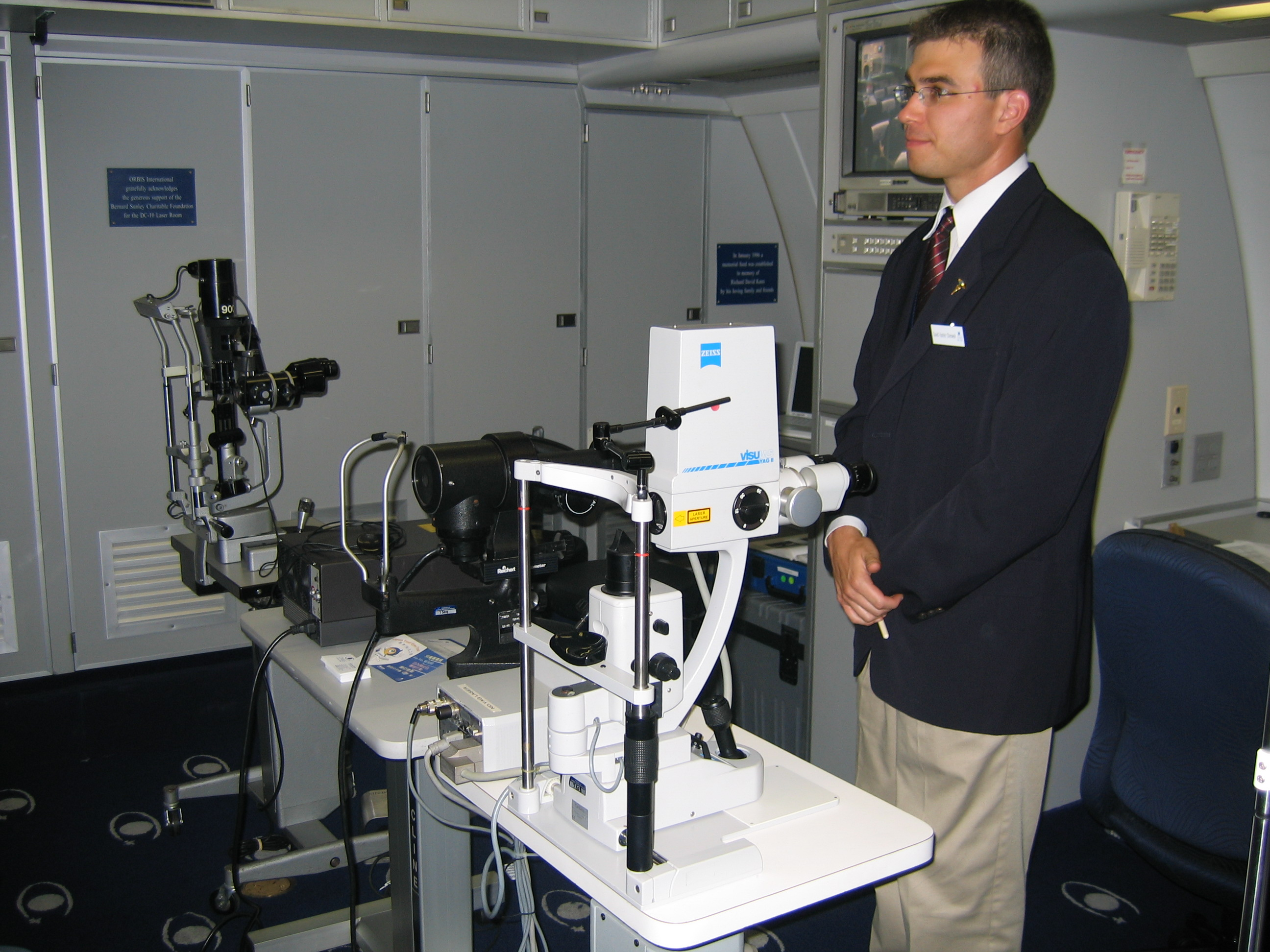
Examination and laser treatment suite inside the Flying Eye Hospital

In June 2016, Orbis revealed its third-generation Flying Eye Hospital. The hospital is a converted McDonnell Douglas MD-10 donated by FedEx and can fly twice as long as its predecessor. It is similar to a land-based hospital and is outfitted with safety features such as a back-up generator and early alert monitoring systems. The hospital also has its own water treatment plant and air conditioning systems. It also houses a 46-seat classroom, sterilization room and operating room and uses 3D technology and live broadcast systems which allow local participants to observe surgeries while they are taking place. A virtual tour of the plane was created as part of the launch which enables users to virtually explore all areas of the plane including the operating room and cargo hold.

Orbis's previous DC-10-10, which was the oldest flying example of its type by then, has since been donated to the Pima Air & Space Museum. It arrived at Davis–Monthan Air Force Base in November 2016 and is currently on display in the museum.

As of 2025, the Flying Eye Hospital has been grounded for inspections and repairs

== Country programs ==
In addition to the Flying Eye Hospital, Orbis operates long-term country programs and collaborates with local governments and organisations and push for eye care to be integrated into national health programs. It has also worked with local universities and healthcare institutions and manage a team of more than 400 medical volunteers from 29 countries to provide expert training to their local partners.

In each country, Orbis works with its local partner institutions to increase their capacity to provide comprehensive, affordable and sustainable eye care services over the long term. The programs include developing specialized hospital facilities, eye banks, patient and health care worker training, and prevention and treatment programs.

In 2015, more than 30,000 medical professionals were trained and more than 2 million patients were examined either on board Flying Eye Hospital or at its partner institutions.

== Cybersight ==
Cybersight is a telemedicine portal founded by Orbis that allows eye health workers in low- and middle-income countries to consult with expert mentors in their field, free of charge. Mentors give their opinion on patient cases, share learning materials, and help local eye health workers develop their skills in blindness treatment and prevention. Since its launch, more than 10,000 electronic cases have taken place. This allows for distance learning and discussion.

Cybersight also offers regular live lectures, a library of educational material, and allows users to take tests and receive certificates of achievement.

On September 10, 2018, Orbis announced a new collaboration with AI company Visulytix to apply their automated imaging technology to Cybersight. Visulytix's Pegasus AI system will be used to analyse images of the back of the eye taken with any standard retina camera or smartphone. Eye doctors in low-resource countries will be amongst the first in the world to have free access to this service on the Cybersight platform, helping them detect and diagnose sight-threatening eye diseases such as diabetic retinopathy, age-related macular degeneration and glaucoma, as well as quickly request a second opinion from Orbis's network of medical experts.
