= All for Nothing? =

- Genre: Reality renovations, Upgrading, DIY
- Created by: Tim Alp
- Directed by: Matt West, Andrew Fedosov, John Driftmier
- Starring: Paul Rushforth, Penny Southam (hosts)
- Narrated by: Jasen Laborde
- Theme music composer: Bartmart Audio
- Country of origin: Canada
- Original language: English
- No. of seasons: 2
- No. of episodes: 39

Production
- Executive producer: Tim Alp
- Producers: Tim Alp, Lisa Nault
- Production locations: Ottawa, Ontario, Canada
- Running time: 45 minutes
- Production company: Mountain Road Productions

Original release
- Network: W Network; Casa (TV channel)
- Release: October 7, 2010 – April 10, 2012

All for Nothing? is a Canadian real state and design television series that aired on the W Network. The series was produced by Mountain Road Productions and was based in Ottawa. The first season premiered on October 7, 2010, comprising 13 one-hour episodes and have since been aired on Casa. It also aired on the Ion Life channel in the United States.

In early 2011, the series was renewed for a second season of 26 episodes and Mark Burnett International (MBI) obtained the worldwide distribution and format rights. The second season premiered on W Network on January 3, 2012.

== Synopsis ==
A real estate and home renovation series, "All for Nothing?" is out to prove that you do not need to spend money to make your home sale ready. Each week, two households compete to improve their design-deficient homes, without budgets. The seller with the highest increase in value at the end of two weeks wins the commission-free listing services of realtor and host, Paul Rushforth. During renovations, homeowners get guidance from Paul and designer, Penny Southam, to help get them through mishaps.

== Hosts ==
=== Paul Rushforth ===
Rushforth is the resident real estate expert and co-host for All for Nothing?. He began his real estate career seven years before the start of the shaw. He is the CEO/owner of Paul Rushforth Real Estate. He is also the host of a weekly radio show, "Open House – The Real Estate and Mortgage Show". He lives in Ottawa with his wife and three children.

=== Penny Southam ===
Southam is the resident designer and co-host for All for Nothing?. She is an interior designer, specializing in architecture and custom homes. She is the principal of Southam Design Inc. and has been a contributing writer for Style at Home, Canadian Architecture & Design and the Ottawa Citizen. She lives in Ottawa with her children.

== Episodes ==
=== Season 1 ===
No.	#	Title	Directed by	Written by	Original release date
1	1001	"Big Family vs. Big Family"	Matt West	N/A	October 7, 2010
The Hermans sprint out of the gate with many friends and family helping to complete their renos while the Awadas go it alone taking the slow and steady approach. Can the tortoise overtake the hare in this race?
2	1002	"City House vs. Country House"	Matt West, John Driftmier	N/A	October 14, 2010
Darlene Moore and roommate Chris Curry tackle the huge job of re-siding their city home while Al and Jen Greer take on a number of smaller projects around their country home. It’s city house versus country house!
3	1003	"Upsizers vs. Downsizers"	Tim Alp, John Driftmier	N/A	October 21, 2010
Empty nesters Chris and Henry let their money do the heavy lifting when it comes to the renos while Aaren and Brianne invest sweat equity into their young family’s cramped and cluttered home.
4	1004	"Family Life vs. Single Life"	Matt West, John Driftmier	N/A	October 28, 2010
Cory and Jen Besharah juggle work and two young sons with reno projects at their family home in a subdivision outside the city while housemates Terri and Heidi upgrade their urban singles’ townhome after three years of neglect.
5	1005	"Bartering vs. Bargaining"	Matt West, John Driftmier	N/A	November 4, 2010
Dayna puts her bartering skills to the test to keep her reno costs low while Chris and Kitty bargain their way through the competition. Who will prevail in the bartering versus bargaining rivalry?
6	1006	"Growing Family vs. Growing Family"	Tim Alp, Matt West, John Driftmier	N/A	November 11, 2010
The Kangs and the Muis both have small starter homes that can no longer accommodate their growing families. They will battle to save big dollars in this competition to finance larger homes. Who will come out on top?.
7	1007	"Modern vs. Unique"	Tim Alp, Matt West, John Driftmier	N/A	November 18, 2010
Mat and Sonja make improvements to their modern chic city home while Vicki works to increase the value of her unique small-town home that used to be a church. It’s a fight to the finish between Modern Chic and Unique!
8	1008	"Starter Home vs. Semi-Detached"	Matt West, John Driftmier	N/A	January 27, 2011
Paula and Rob focus their efforts on fundraising while Jacob and Shoba sink a lot of time and energy into a Penny design feature that Paul doesn’t support. It’s a mad scramble to the finish in this Starter Home vs. Semi-Detached battle.
9	1009	"De-Clutter vs. Construction"	Matt West, John Driftmier	N/A	February 3, 2011
Chantal and Phil’s small city home is overwhelmed with stuff and needs to show much larger. Martina attempts to elevate the value of her outdated rural home. Who will prevail in the clutter versus construction competition?
10	1010	"Suburb vs. City"	Matt West, John Driftmier	N/A	February 10, 2011
Roxy and Jeff Gregoire update their cluttered suburban home while Kathleen McGovern takes her city home to the next level. It all comes down to a battle of wills to finish on time!
11	1011	"Mother & Daughter vs. Husband & Wife"	Matt West, John Driftmier	N/A	February 17, 2011
Denise and Melanie Reid recruit an army of family and friends to help with their renos while Jeff and Jill Alexander barter for assistance with their home improvements. Which will make for the winning strategy?
12	1012	"Small Town vs. Small Town"	Matt West	N/A	February 24, 2011
Homeowners Jonathan and Emilie take on Dan and Stacey in a small town rivalry. Both teams are struck by illness causing much delay; will either team finish their renos on time?
13	1013	"Chaos vs. Calm"	Matt West	N/A	March 3, 2011
Suzanne and Costa’s ‘go big or go home’ approach results in a chaotic two weeks, while Robin and Steve’s methodical reno is very calm and orderly. With these radically different approaches, which method is the one to get the win?

=== Season 2 ===
No.	#	Title	Directed by	Written by	Original release date
14	2014	"Chris & Nora vs. Lisa & Danny"	Matt West	N/A	January 3, 2012
It’s the battle of the condominiums as Chris and Nora have a slow reno start and are unlucky in fundraising while Lisa and Danny strike the community jackpot but are delayed in their important bathroom project.
15	2015	"Suzanne & Kevin vs. Dan & Sheri"	Andrew Fedosov	N/A	January 10, 2012
Suzanne and Kevin must fix two years’ worth of unfinished projects in just two weeks while Dan and Sheri, despite help from a lot of friends, find themselves in a race against time to complete all of their renos. It’s anyone’s game!
16	2016	"Jeff & Joanne vs. Jill & Joel"	Matt West	N/A	January 17, 2012
Jeff and Joanne tackle their kitchen reno with gusto resulting in a risky expense tally. Joel and Jill keep their expenses low but jeopardize their chances of finishing on time with their slow pace.
17	2017	"Trevor & Bonnie vs. Natalie & Ray"	Andrew Fedosov	N/A	January 24, 2012
When Trevor and Bonnie face a power outage and a trip to emergency, it’s up to their large team to conquer their reno delays. Natalie and Ray have a huge task ahead of them but fail to assemble a team to help. Can they do it alone?
18	2018	"Pat & Sue vs. Tracey & Angela"	Matt West	N/A	January 31, 2012
This race is down to the wire as Pat and Sue’s tight budget forces them to agonize over every penny spent while Tracey and Angie rely on their huge contingent of helpers to deal with all of their unexpected issues!
19	2019	"Lisa & Christie vs. Andrew & Michelle"	Andrew Fedosov	N/A	February 21, 2012
Things really heat up for Lisa when she loses Christie and struggles to complete projects without her reno partner while Andrew and Michelle struggle to complete their renovation nightmare.
20	2020	"Lynne & Dave vs. Kyle & Carol"	Matt West	N/A	February 28, 2012
Tired right out of the gate, Lynne updates and de-clutters her small starter home with fiancé, Dave while Kyle and Carol take on a time sucking basement reno to increase their home’s value. Who will make it to the finish line?
21	2021	"Suzanne & Kat vs. Guy & Kelly"	Andrew Fedosov	N/A	March 6, 2012
With little money in the bank, Suzanne and Kat must fundraise enough to front their reno expenses while Kelly and Guy struggle with an exhausting list of projects, despite raising a surplus of funds.
22	2022	"AJ & Ashley vs. Mitch & Laura"	Matt West	N/A	March 13, 2012
AJ and Ashley attempt to repair two years' worth of smelly pet damage to their home while their competition Mitch, with new girlfriend Laura, faces the past as he de-clutters and updates the home his father left to him.
23	2023	"Nicki & Tori vs. Angela & Dave"	Andrew Fedosov	N/A	March 20, 2012
Nicki and Tori transform their home from frat-house style to mainstream appeal with much help from their father as Angela and Dave strive to maximize their home’s appeal with high-end fixtures in this battle of the ‘burbs!
24	2024	"Brigitte & Dave vs. Peter & Shelagh"	Matt West	N/A	March 27, 2012
Brigitte and Dave tackle an enormous job list in the hopes of getting their massive house market ready while Peter and Shelagh prioritize their workload and tackle fewer projects. Which strategy will be the key to the prize?
25	2025	"Lucille & Natalie vs. Paula & Josh"	Andrew Fedosov	N/A	April 3, 2012
It’s a mother-daughter, mother-son rivalry! Lucille and Natalie attempt to complete their suburban-home update with high style while Paula and Josh tackle a complete design overhaul of their small city house.
26	2026	"Randy & Sarita vs. Jean-Marcel & Melodie"	Matt West	N/A	April 10, 2012
Jean-Marcel and Melodie make remarkable headway in the first days of demolition whereas Randy and Sarita don't even know where to start. Paul and Penny are disappointed in both teams at the half way check-in. Will they pull it together?

== Awards ==
On August 4, 2011, All for Nothing? was nominated for a Gemini Award in the Best Reality Program or Series category, alongside Dragons' Den (Canada) (CBC), Conviction Kitchen (CityTV), CheF*OFF (Food Network Canada) and Best. Trip. Ever. (Discovery Channel). The series also won awards two years in a row at the New York Festivals, having won a Finalist Certificate in 2011 and a Bronze World Medal in 2012, both in the Real Estate/Home Improvement category.

All for Nothing? was nominated for a Golden Sheaf Award at the 2012 Yorkton Film Festival in the Lifestyle Programs category for episode 11 of season 1, "Mother & Daughter vs. Husband & Wife".

Year	Nominee / work	Award	Result
2012	All for Nothing?	New York Festivals, Category: Real Estate/Home Improvement - Episode 11 "Mother & Daughter vs. Husband & Wife"	Won Finalist Certificate
2012	All for Nothing?	Summit Awards (SCA), Category: Editing/Effects - MC Gagnon "Episode 18 "Pat & Sue vs. Tracey & Angie"	Won Silver
2012	All for Nothing?	Golden Sheaf Awards, Category: Lifestyle Programs - Episode 11 "Mother & Daughter vs. Husband & Wife"	Nominated
2011	All for Nothing?	Gemini Award, Category: Best Reality Program or Series	Nominated
2011	All for Nothing?	Summit Awards (SCA), Category: Editing/Effects - MC Gagnon "Episode 9 De-Clutter vs. Construction"	Won Bronze
2011	All for Nothing?	Summit Awards (SCA), Category: Direction - Matt West "Episode 1 Big Family vs. Big Family"	Won Bronze
2011	All for Nothing?	New York Festivals, Category: Real Estate/Home Improvement - Episode 1 "Big Family vs. Big Family"	Won Bronze World Medal

== International syndication ==
Country / region	Name	Television network	Dubbing / subtitles
Canada	All for Nothing?	Casa	French

== See also ==
- Broken House Chronicles
- Me, My House & I
- Design U
- Be Real with JR Digs
- The Real Estate Adventures of Sandy & Maryse
- The Restaurant Adventures of Caroline & Dave
- Sheltered
- Totally Random (Website & TV Show)
