= Totally Random =

- Genre: Sketch Comedy Website
- Created by: Tim Alp
- Directed by: Tim Alp
- Starring: Ryley, Jayden, Mason (Hosts), Jason, Grant & Umu (TR Kids)
- Theme music composer: Bartmart Audio
- Country of origin: Canada
- Original language: English
- No. of seasons: 1
- No. of episodes: 8

Production
- Executive producer: Tim Alp
- Producers: Tim Alp, Chelsea O'Connor
- Production locations: Ottawa, Ontario, Canada
- Running time: 11 minutes
- Production company: Mountain Road Productions

Original release
- Release: April 1, 2012 – June 3, 2013

Totally Random is a Canadian sketch comedy web series produced exclusively for the web and interactive website uniquely intertwined. Both created and produced by Ottawa-based Mountain Road Productions the site officially launched on February 15, 2012 and is majorly funded by The Canada Media Fund's Experimental Stream.

The first episode premiered on April 1, 2012, in the TV section of the website, and was followed by a second episode being released two weeks later. The series is currently on a summer hiatus, and new episodes will air beginning September 1, 2012, to showcase the digital creations (SnowBalls) made on the site, Totally Random, over the summer.

== About ==
The first of its kind, Totally Random introduces an interactive form of television along with a social networking website aimed at kids aged 7 to 11. The series aims to introduce the next generation of kids to digital media by putting their creations in the spotlight, establishing a partnership between the producer and the viewer to create content for the TV series. The goal is a greater sense of ownership for the viewer and more fresh, relevant and timely content being produced.

It is an online entertainment experience where kids are meant to express themselves without limitations or expectations. The proprietary technology that drives the website aims to allow individual creativity, innovation and imagination while sharing the experience with a larger social network of kids.

The site features a large library of random elements; supplying kids with raw materials like still images, text, audio, and video to help them build their digital creations.

== How It Works ==
Using the library of random elements referred to as Seeds, and the website’s photo editor, kids build digital creations called SnowBalls. SnowBalls with the most tags move to the top and are featured in the Totally Random TV series. Presented by energetic hosts Ryley, Jayden, and Mason, the episodes encompass adventures and random comedy skits performed by the TR Kids, Grant, Jason, and Umu. Every episode features user-created content, while setting the stage for the seeds and themes of the next episode’s challenges and tasking the audience to come up with content, all the while creating new materials for the kids to use in their next SnowBall.

== Reception ==
Totally Random was showcased in Canadian Living's August 2012 issue, having made the renowned magazine's Editor's Picks for an interactive TV series for kids aged seven to 11.

== See also ==
- All for Nothing?
- Be Real with JR Digs
- Broken House Chronicles
- Design U
- Me, My House & I
- Sheltered
- The Real Estate Adventures of Sandy & Maryse
- The Restaurant Adventures of Caroline & Dave
