= Kortney Wilson =

Canadian actress and singer

- Also known as: Kortney Kayle
- Born: Kortney Galerno; February 8, 1979 (age 47); Windsor, Ontario, Canada
- Genre: Country
- Occupations: Singer, Realtor, HGTV Star
- Instrument: Vocals
- Years active: 2001–present
- Label: Lyric Street
- Member of: The Wilsons
- Website: Official website

Kortney Wilson (born February 8, 1979, as Kortney Galerno) is a Canadian actress, country music singer, real estate professional, designer, and television presenter, best known as cohost with her former husband Dave Wilson of home renovation programming for HGTV Canada.

== Background ==
She was born in Windsor, Ontario, and spent her childhood in Sudbury before her family moved to Kitchener when she was 13.

== Musical career ==
As a youth in 1994, she was performing as Annie with Royal City Musical Productions in Guelph. By 1998 she had signed a management deal with Scream Marketing and Christy DiNapoli, a publishing deal with Scream Music Publishing in Nashville, and was working with Reba McEntire. In 2001, she issued two singles as Kortney Kayle on Lyric Street Records, but her debut album never materialized. By October 2001, she had left the label.

Her highest charting single was "Unbroken by You", which reached No. 50 in 2001. She also recorded with Dave as a duo. In 2001, Kortney Wilson also made several appearances on the soap opera, One Life to Live. She co-wrote Ryan Tyler's 2003 single "Run, Run, Run", which was also released by Krysta Scoggins.

Kortney Wilson was also signed to Open Road Recordings with Dave Wilson as The Wilsons. Dave had also recorded for Lyric Street. They later lost their recording deal and turned to other jobs and eventually to renovating and flipping houses in Nashville.

Music videos by The Wilsons years earlier, including "Marry Me Again", "Stick Together", and "Mine All Mine", continued to air on YouTube as of August 2018. Another music video featuring Kortney Wilson in 2001, under the stage name Kortney Kayle, titled "Something To Cry About (Unreleased Song)", was also still airing on YouTube.

== Subsequent career ==
In 2006, Kortney and Dave Wilson did some cosmetic renovations on a home and sold it, at a $30,000 profit. The couple realized they could earn additional money by flipping other houses, initially part-time while continuing in music and other part time work. Eventually, this would become a full time business and later, the basis for their HGTV television programs. In 2008, Kortney Wilson got her real estate licence and she also took over the design aspects of the homes they were renovating. In the next year, the Wilson family began to star in the CMT Canada reality series Meet the Wilsons about trying to juggle a family (two children at that time) while pursuing music careers.

In 2015, they began working on their new series about buying, renovating and flipping houses, Masters of Flip, originally on the W Network. As of mid-2018, the series was running on HGTV in the US and Canada but also aired in numerous other countries. In May 2018, HGTV also began airing another reno/flip series with the Wilsons, Music City Fix; in the ten episodes, the couple renovated a "crumbling Craftsman bungalow" in historic East Nashville, Tennessee, while striving to retain as much of the original character as possible.

Masters of Flip ended after its fourth season, with the couple moving on to produce and host the new HGTV series Making it Home with Kortney and Dave. After the Wilsons' divorce, Dave Wilson left the show, which continued with Kenny Brain replacing Dave as the contractor.

Following the end of Making It Home in 2024, Wilson and Brain launched the new series Life Is Messy, devoted to helping homeowners declutter and reorganize their living spaces, on Home Network in 2026.

== Personal life ==
Kortney Wilson has joint Canadian/American citizenship.

Kortney Wilson was born in Windsor, Ontario, but grew up in Sudbury, Ontario, and then in Ayr, Ontario, Canada, before moving to Nashville at age 18. She was with Dave Wilson for 18 years and married for 14 of those. The couple first met when Dave (originally from Ottawa, Ontario) was working in England as part of a band, but was in Nashville on a writing vacation; he did not return to London after meeting Kortney. The couple announced on December 20, 2019, that they are separating and will divorce. They have two biological children, Jett and Sully and an adopted daughter, Lennox Esmee. In July 2021, Wilson introduced her Instagram followers to her boyfriend, Ryan and has continued to share relationship photos.

== Discography ==
=== Scrapped album ===
No Turning Back

Studio album (cancelled) by Kortney Kayle
- Released: Cancelled
- Genre: Country
- Label: Lyric Street
- Producers: David Malloy; Mark Bright

Singles from No Turning Back
- 1. "Don't Let Me Down" Released: February 20, 2001; 2. "Unbroken by You" Released: May 7, 2001

Wilson, while under the name Kortney Kayle, began work on her debut studio album titled No Turning Back in late 1999 with producer David Malloy and extra production by Mark Bright. According to Wilson, she wanted the album to be quite energetic and garner attention. While it was scheduled for release on August 28, 2001, it was cancelled altogether following the commercial failure of its singles and Wilson's departure from Lyric Street.

==== Singles ====
"Don't Let Me Down" was released on February 20, 2001. It debuted and peaked at number 60 on the US Hot Country Songs chart the week of March 24, 2001. "Unbroken by You" was the second and final single, released on May 7, 2001. It debuted at number 53 on June 9, 2001, and rose to a minuscule peak of number 50.

==== Track listing ====
No Turning Back track listing
No.	Title	Writer(s)	Producer	Length
1.	"Unbroken by You"	Gary Burr; Jack Blades; Trey Bruce	David Malloy	2:46
2.	"Something to Cry About"	Phillip White; Rachel Proctor	Mark Bright	3:26
3.	"You Got My Love"	Bob Regan; Tom Shapiro	Mark Bright	3:29
4.	"I Say Hello"	David Malloy; Tim Johnson	David Malloy	3:48
5.	"Yeah, Right"
6.	"Jump"	Kortney Kayle; Connie Harrington; Shaye Smith	Mark Bright	3:35
7.	"Soul Mates"
8.	"Not This Girl"
9.	"Don't Let Me Down"	Lonnie Wilson; Zack Turner	Mark Bright	3:29
10.	"Love Invented Us"
11.	"Dancing with Angels"

=== Singles ===
Year	Single	Peak positions	Album
Year	Single	US Country	Album
2001	"Don't Let Me Down"	60	No Turning Back (unreleased; as Kortney Kayle)
2001	"Unbroken by You"	50	No Turning Back (unreleased; as Kortney Kayle)

=== Music videos ===
Year	Video
2001	"Don't Let Me Down"
