= Force Four Entertainment =

Canadian film and television production company

Force Four Entertainment Inc.
- Company type: Subsidiary
- Industry: Television production
- Founded: 1983; 43 years ago
- Headquarters: Vancouver, British Columbia, Canada
- Key people: Rob Bromley (President); John Ritchie (Executive Producer); Gillian Lowrey (Director, Business Affairs)
- Products: Television programs
- Owner: Lionsgate Studios
- Parent: Entertainment One (2014–2024); Lionsgate Alternative Television (2024–present)

Force Four Entertainment (formerly known as Force Four Productions) is a Canadian film and television production company based in Vancouver.

Force Four Entertainment produces a variety of live-action programming, including lifestyle, documentary, and scripted entertainment. Original productions include Million Dollar Neighbourhood and Murder She Solved (OWN Canada), Urban Suburban (HGTV), and The Cupcake Girls (W Network).

== History ==
Force Four Entertainment was founded in 1983 as Force Four Productions. The company was renamed to its current name in 1999. On August 28, 2014, the company was acquired by Ontario-based Entertainment One. Partners Rob Bromley, John Richie, and Gillian Lowrey joined eOne as part of the deal.

== List of television series and films produced and distributed by Force Four Entertainment ==
- Keeping Canada Safe
- Keeping Canada Alive
- Chuck and Danny's Road Trip
- Tricked
- Border Security: America's Front Line
- Battle Cats
- Urban Suburban
- Border Security: Canada's Front Line
- The Cupcake Girls
- Murder She Solved
- Tube Tales: TV's Real Stories
- Six Degrees of TV
- 65 Redroses
- Manhattan Matchmaker
- The Bachelor Canada
- Million Dollar Neighbourhood
- Family Cook Off
- Murder She Solved: True Crime
- Playing for Keeps
- Human Cargo
- The Love Crimes of Gillian Guess
- Murder Unveiled
- Jinnah on Crime: Pizza 911
- Jinnah on Crime: White Knight, Black Widow
- Village on a Diet
- Tube Tales: TV's Real Stories
- The Shopping Bags
- Making It Big
- You, Me & the Kids
- Adventures in Parenting
- Wakanheja
- Art Zone
- Frank Mahovlich: The Big M
- Terry Fox: A Dream as Big as Our Country
- Better Ask Nellie: Nellie Cournoyea
- Family Drew: The Molson Family
- Brothers: The Phil and Tony Esposito Story
- Silken Laumann: Flying on Water
- Emily Carr: A Woman of All Sorts
- Lynn Johnston: Lynn's Looking Glass
- Christine Silverberg: Top Cop
- Rick Hansen: Never Give Up On Your Dreams
- Today Is a Good Day: Remembering Chief Dan George
- Carbon Hunters
- End of an Era
- Toxic Legacies
- Grizzlies of the Canadian Rockies
- Crocophiles
- Corrie Crazy: Canada Loves Coronation Street
- Brothel Project
- FASD: Finding Hope
- Rock and Roll Kid
- Making Waves
- The Ties That Bind
- Fall Out
- Without God
- Sing Out
- Welcome Back to Molly's Reach
- Wanderings: A Journey to Connect
- From Grief to Action
- Innocent Tricks
- Broken Words
- Love, Culture and the Kitchen Sink
- Laughing Through the Pain
- Seed (TV series)
- The Audience
