= OWN TV =

OWN TV or O.W.N. TV, or variations thereof, may refer to:

- Oprah Winfrey Network (U.S. TV channel), American television channel based in Los Angeles, California
- Oprah Winfrey Network (Canadian TV channel), a Canadian television station, originally Canadian Learning Television, which licenses the name and rebroadcasts content from the American OWN station
