= Million Dollar Neighbourhood =

- Genre: Documentary
- Presented by: Bruce Sellery; Joti Samra
- Country of origin: Canada
- No. of seasons: 2
- No. of episodes: 19

Production
- Production locations: Aldergrove, British Columbia (Season 1); Bowmanville, Ontario (Season 2)
- Running time: 40 to 44 minutes (excluding commercials)
- Production company: Force Four Entertainment

Original release
- Network: Oprah Winfrey Network
- Release: January 22, 2012 – present

Million Dollar Neighbourhood is a Canadian documentary television series on the Oprah Winfrey Network. The series debuted on January 22, 2012.

== Premise ==
For the show, a group of 100 families work to increase their total net worth by $1 million in 10 weeks. On each episode, the group awards one family $10,000. If the overall goal is reached, one individual wins $100,000.

== Episodes ==
=== Season 1 (2012) ===
No. overall	No. in season	Title	Original release date
1	1	"Hidden Money"	January 22, 2012
2	2	"The Great Purge"	January 29, 2012
3	3	"Skills and Jobs"	February 5, 2012
4	4	"Breaking Bread & Making Dough"	February 12, 2012
Note: Anthony Sedlak makes a guest appearance in this episode.
5	5	"Money in Motion"	February 19, 2012
6	6	"Entrepreneurial Aldergerove"	February 26, 2012
7	7	"The Kids Are Alright"	March 4, 2012
8	8	"Get On My Property"	March 11, 2012
9	9	"On Your Own"	March 18, 2012
10	10	"Accountability"	March 25, 2012

=== Season 2 (2013) ===
No. overall	No. in season	Title	Original release date
11	1	"Lighten Up"	January 7, 2013
12	2	"Rolling in It"	January 14, 2013
13	3	"Money Hungry"	January 21, 2013
14	4	"Crash Test"	January 28, 2013
15	5	"Buried Treasure"	February 4, 2013
16	6	"Discretion Advised"	February 11, 2013
17	7	"New Lease on Life"	February 18, 2013
18	8	"Pay It Forward"	February 25, 2013
19	9	"Back in Business"	March 4, 2013
20	10	"Leave a Legacy"	March 11, 2013
