= The Wilsons (country duo) =

Canadian country music duo, 2006–2012

- Origin: Richmond Hill, Ontario, Canada
- Genres: Country
- Years active: 2006–2012
- Labels: Open Road
- Members: Dave Wilson; Kortney Wilson

The Wilsons are Canadian husband and wife Dave and Kortney Wilson, who were country musicians and television personalities in Nashville, Tennessee. They were television presenters on the HGTV program Masters of Flip, having given up their music careers. They operated a business that flips (buys, renovates and sells) houses, the basis for the television program. The Wilsons announced they were separating after 18 years of marriage on December 19, 2019.

== History ==
Dave, from Ottawa, Ontario, and Kortney, from Ayr, Ontario, separately moved to Nashville and signed solo deals with Lyric Street Records. While neither artist released an album for Lyric Street, Kortney charted two singles on the Billboard Hot Country Singles & Tracks chart in the United States as Kortney Kayle. Kortney also made several appearances on the soap opera One Life to Live.

The pair met and started a family after they were both released from the label in 2003. They began performing together as The Wilsons in 2006. In 2009, they became the stars of Meet the Wilsons, an eight-part, half-hour series directed and edited by Bill Filipiak airing on CMT in Canada. The show debuted in the United States in December on CMT with a four-episode marathon.

The duo's first single, "Stick Together", was released in August 2009. The Wilsons released their first album, The Wilsons, for Open Road Recordings in June 2010. They later lost their recording deal and turned to renovating and flipping houses in Nashville, and this led to them starring in the reality television series Masters of Flip. The series runs on HGTV in North America but is also shown in numerous other countries.

In 2020, their new series Making it Home with Kortney and Dave premiered on HGTV Canada, where Dave and Kortney Wilson help homeowners create strategic moves with their money using their flipping expertise.

The show lasted one season before being rebranded Making it Home with Kortney and Kenny, with Kenny Brain replacing Dave Wilson as the contractor following the Wilsons' separation.

== Discography ==
=== Albums ===
Title	Details
The Wilsons	Release date: June 15, 2010; Label: Open Road Recordings

=== Singles ===
Year	Single	Album
2009	"Stick Together"	The Wilsons
2010	"Mine All Mine"	The Wilsons
2012	"Marry Me Again"	—N/a

=== Music videos ===
Year	Video	Director
2009	"Stick Together"	Warren P. Sonoda
2010	"Mine All Mine"	Warren P. Sonoda
2012	"Marry Me Again"	Jeth Weinrich
2012	"My List This Christmas"	
