= The Wilsons =

The Wilsons may refer to:

- The Wilsons, or the Wilson brothers, actors Owen Wilson, Luke Wilson, and Andrew Wilson.
- The Wilsons (album), 1997 album by Carnie and Wendy Wilson
- The Wilsons (country duo), musicians and television hosts
