= Cooking Channel (Canada) =

Canadian TV channel

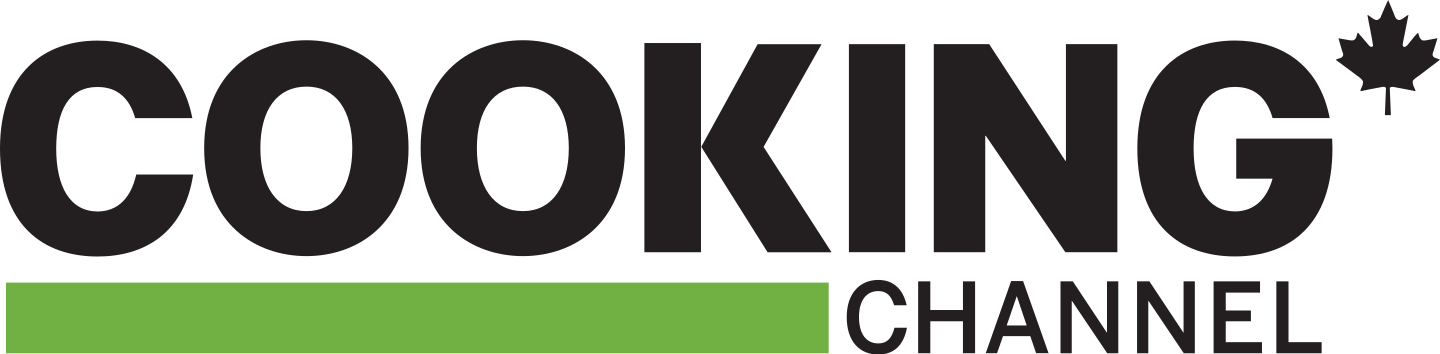
- Country: Canada
- Broadcast area: Nationwide
- Headquarters: Toronto, Ontario

Programming
- Language: English
- Picture format: 1080i HDTV (downscaled to letterboxed 480i for the SDTV feed)

Ownership
- Owner: Corus Entertainment (80.2%); Warner Bros. Discovery (19.8%)
- Sister channels: ABC Spark; Adult Swim; CMT; DTour; Flavour Network; Home Network; Lifetime; OWN (2016-2024); Slice; W Network

History
- Launched: September 7, 2001; 24 years ago
- Closed: December 31, 2024; 17 months ago
- Former names: SexTV: The Channel (2001–2010); W Movies (2010–2016)

Cooking Channel was a Canadian English language discretionary specialty channel majority-owned by Corus Entertainment. Dedicated to programming related to food and cooking, it served as a spin-off of Food Network.

The channel was launched in 2001 as SexTV: The Channel under the ownership of CHUM Limited; based on the Citytv series of the same name, it carried programming related to human sexuality and relationships. In 2009, then-owner CTVglobemedia sold the channel to Corus; in 2010, the channel was relaunched as W Movies, a spin-off of W Network focused on films targeting women. It then relaunched as Cooking Channel on December 12, 2016; following the relaunch, Scripps Networks Interactive took a minority interest in the channel.

In June 2024, Rogers Sports & Media announced that it had acquired Canadian rights to Warner Bros. Discovery factual and lifestyle television brands beginning in 2025, including Food Network and Cooking Channel. While Corus announced plans to relaunch Food Network as Flavour Network, no such plans were announced for Cooking Channel, and the channel was shut down by Corus on January 1, 2025, with its licence revoked by the CRTC on February 21. Rogers does not plan to launch a new specialty channel for Cooking Channel, with any original programming to be distributed via its digital platforms.

== History ==
=== SexTV: The Channel ===
In June 2001, CHUM Limited received approval by the Canadian Radio-television and Telecommunications Commission (CRTC) to launch a national Category 2 specialty channel known as Relationship Television, a channel described as being "devoted exclusively to programming related to love, romance, marriage, relationship-themed game shows, sexuality and gender issues, family planning, relationship breakdown and magazine style programming featuring romantic vacation resorts."

SexTV: The Channel logo (2001-2010)

The channel was launched three months later on September 7, 2001 as SexTV: The Channel, a channel modeled after and its name derived from SexTV, a now-former program on Citytv (which was a CHUM-owned property at the time). SexTV aired programming on sex and human sexuality, including issues on love, dating, romance and related subjects.

In July 2006, Bell Globemedia (later CTVglobemedia) announced that it would purchase CHUM for an estimated CAD$1.7 billion. Due to CTV planning to retain the Citytv network, SexTV: The Channel was among the channels along with A-Channel, Access, CKX-TV Brandon and CLT to be sold to Rogers Communications on April 9, 2007, awaiting the final approval. The sale was approved by the CRTC on June 8, 2007, on the condition that CTV must divest the Citytv stations, effectively cancelling the sale of SexTV: The Channel to Rogers and the transaction was completed on June 22, 2007 while the Citytv stations were sold to Rogers later that year.

=== Under Corus ownership ===
==== W Movies ====
W Movies logo (2010-2016)

On July 14, 2009, CTVglobemedia announced that it would sell Sex TV, along with Drive-In Classics (then Sundance Channel, now defunct), to Corus Entertainment for a combined CAD$40 million. In late September, Corus announced that the channel would be rebranded as W Movies, a spin-off of W Network with a focus on films targeting women. The sale was approved by the CRTC on November 19, with the transaction being completed by December. The on-air relaunch as W Movies took place on March 1, 2010.

On December 2, 2011, W Movies launched a high definition feed. It was available through all major television providers in the country.

==== Relaunch as Cooking Channel ====
After the CRTC relaxed genre protection rules in 2015, Corus announced on October 19, 2016 that W Movies would be relaunched as a Canadian version of Cooking Channel on December 12, 2016. The network served as a spin-off of Corus's Canadian version of Food Network, and came shortly after Bell Media's re-launch of Gusto, which competes directly against Food Network. Scripps Networks Interactive subsequently acquired a 19.8% interest in the channel.

==== Network closure ====
In June 2024, Rogers announced it had acquired the rights to all Warner Bros. Discovery factual and lifestyle television brands beginning January 1, 2025, including Food Network and Cooking Channel. Rogers stated that the Cooking Channel brand will operate as a digital platform on Citytv+, rather than being relaunched as a new discretionary service. While Corus announced plans to relaunch Food Network as Flavour Network on December 30, 2024, several television providers have stated that Cooking Channel will shut down on January 1, 2025. This change was directly confirmed by Corus via the channel's website in December, stating that Corus will no longer offer the channel and would focus more on Flavour Network and Home Network. The channel's licence was revoked by the CRTC on February 21, 2025.

As of 2025, the channel's website is now directed to the Cooking Channel section of Citytv+.

== Programming ==
Cooking Channel primarily aired programming similar to Food Network, albeit with a larger emphasis on instruction- and personality-based programming over reality and competition-style series.

As SexTV: The Channel, the network aired programming devoted to human sexuality including issues on love, dating, romance and related subjects. Past programs on the network included Sex Wars: Gender in the Age of Representation, Beyond Carnival: Sex in Brazil, and Sexploration.
