= Making it Home with Kortney and Kenny =

Canadian reality television show

Making it Home with Kortney and Kenny, formerly Making it Home with Kortney and Dave, is a Canadian reality television show, which premiered in 2020 on the Canadian and American versions of HGTV. Originally starring Dave and Kortney Wilson, formerly of the series Masters of Flip, the series features the duo helping homeowners to perform renovations on their homes.

The series debuted January 22, 2020 on HGTV Canada, and July 6, 2020, on HGTV U.S.

Mike Rilstone received a Canadian Screen Award nomination for Best Photography in a Lifestyle or Reality Program or Series at the 9th Canadian Screen Awards in 2021.

The series was renewed for a second season in May 2021, with Kenny Brain replacing Dave Wilson as the contractor.

As of 2024 the series is no longer in production. Kortney Wilson and Brain launched a new series, Life Is Messy, on Home Network in 2026.
