= BookTelevision =

Defunct Canadian cable TV channel

Coordinates: 43.649701°N 79.390233°W

- BookTelevision logo
- Country: Canada
- Broadcast area: Nationwide
- Headquarters: Toronto, Ontario

Programming
- Language(s): English
- Picture format: 480i (SDTV)

Ownership
- Owner: CHUM Limited (2001–2007); CTVglobemedia (2007–2011) (CTV Limited); Bell Media (2011–2021)
- Parent: Learning and Skills Television of Alberta Limited

History
- Launched: September 7, 2001
- Closed: February 21, 2021

BookTelevision was a Canadian English language specialty channel owned by Bell Media.

The channel was originally established in 2001 by Learning and Skills Television of Alberta Ltd., then partially owned by CHUM Limited, airing programming relating to books, literature, and various media.

Following its acquisition by Bell, the network later shifted primarily to airing Bell Media library programming with little relevance to its original format. Amid declining investments in the channel, BookTelevision was shut down on February 21, 2021.

== History ==
In November 2000, Learning and Skills Television of Alberta, a company majority owned by CHUM Limited (60%), was awarded a category 1 television broadcasting licence by the Canadian Radio-television and Telecommunications Commission (CRTC) called BookTelevision - The Channel, described as "a national English-language Category 1 specialty television service that will feature magazines and talk shows, dramas and documentaries that are exclusively based upon printed and published works, and offered with additional programming that provides an educational context and promotes reading."

The channel was launched on September 7, 2001. Although, shortly after the channel's launch, "The Channel" was dropped from its name and logo, resulting in a name change to simply BookTelevision.

On February 15, 2005, CHUM completed the purchase of the remaining interest in LSTA, bringing its ownership to 100 percent. A year later, in July 2006, Bell Globemedia (later renamed CTVglobemedia) announced that it would purchase CHUM for an estimated $1.7 billion CAD, included in the sale was LSTA and its interest in BookTelevision. The sale was subject to CRTC approval and was approved in June 2007, with the transaction completed on June 22, 2007. In 2008, LSTA (then known as Access Media Group) was wound up into CTV Limited (the renamed CHUM Limited).

On September 10, 2010, BCE (a minority shareholder in CTVglobemedia) announced that it planned to acquire 100% interest in CTVglobemedia for a total debt and equity transaction cost of $3.2 billion CAD. The deal which required CRTC approval, was approved on March 7, 2011 and closed on April 1 of that year, on which CTVglobemedia was rebranded Bell Media.

Along with Fashion Television, the channel later abandoned its original format, and began to primarily air reruns of library programming from other Bell Media networks, and after CRTC category restrictions were repealed in 2015, reruns of dramas such as JAG and Matlock, properties that had no literary inspiration. The channel ceased investments in original Canadian programming, and was rarely promoted by Bell. In January 2021, the CRTC approved a request by Bell to revoke BookTelevision and Fashion Television's licenses, stating that it planned to shut both channels down on February 21.
