= Ryan Tyler =

American singer-songwriter

- Birth name: Ryan McPherson
- Born: October 6, 1973 (age 51); Atlanta, Georgia, U.S.
- Origin: Nashville, Tennessee, U.S.
- Genres: Country
- Occupation(s): Singer, songwriter
- Instrument: Vocals
- Years active: 2003–2004
- Labels: Arista Nashville

Ryan McPherson Rygmyr (born October 6, 1973), known professionally as Ryan Tyler, is an American country music artist. Signed to the Arista Nashville label, charted two singles: "Run, Run, Run" in 2003 and "The Last Thing She Said".

== Biography ==
Ryan Lindsay McPherson was born October 6, 1973, in Atlanta, Georgia, and raised in Duluth, Georgia. She is an alumna of Arizona State University. After graduating from there, McPherson moved to Seattle, Washington with her husband, Tyler Rygmyr. She then moved again to Nashville, Tennessee, in 2001 to pursue a country music career. She chose her husband's first name as her stage name, because she considered it easier to pronounce than her married name. Two years after moving to Nashville, she was signed by Arista Nashville in 2003. The label released two singles: "Run, Run, Run" and "The Last Thing She Said", which both charted on Billboard Hot Country Songs between 2003 and 2004. "Run, Run, Run" was co-written by Hunter Davis, Little Texas guitarist Porter Howell, and Canadian country singer Kortney Kayle, while Tyler wrote "The Last Thing She Said" with Nashville songwriter Shaye Smith and record producer Mickey Jack Cones. In addition to these, Tyler co-wrote Kerry Harvick's 2004 single "Cowgirls" with Hillary Lindsey and Angelo Petraglia. Deborah Evans Price of Billboard reviewed "The Last Thing She Said" favorably, calling it a "poignant story song" while also praising Tyler's vocal and the production of Scott Hendricks.

Tyler's album for Arista Nashville was never completed due to her contract expiring, and she was released from Arista's roster in 2004. After exiting Arista Nashville in 2004, Tyler performed a series of concerts in Arizona that also included Clay Walker, Tracy Lawrence, and Dusty Drake.

== Singles ==
Year	Single	Peak positions
Year	Single	US Country
2003	"Run, Run, Run"	36
2004	"The Last Thing She Said"	42
