= The Restaurant Adventures of Caroline & Dave =

- Genre: Reality, Docudrama
- Created by: Tim Alp
- Directed by: Tim Alp; Sue Stranks
- Starring: Caroline Ishii; Dave Loan
- Theme music composer: Bartmart Audio
- Country of origin: Canada
- Original language: English
- No. of seasons: 1
- No. of episodes: 13

Production
- Executive producer: Tim Alp
- Producers: Tim Alp; Marisa Fusaro
- Running time: 22 Minutes
- Production company: Mountain Road Productions

Original release
- Network: W Network; OWN Canada
- Release: January 6 – February 17, 2010

The Restaurant Adventures of Caroline & Dave is a 13-part docudrama Canadian television series which premiered on January 6, 2010, on the W Network. Produced by Mountain Road Productions, the series follows neophyte restaurateurs and couple, Caroline Ishii and Dave Loan as they struggle to realize their dream of opening ZenKitchen, a vegetarian restaurant situated in Ottawa’s trendy Chinatown.

Episodes aired on OWN Canada Fridays at 3PM ET (Eastern Time Zone).

== Synopsis ==
Over the course of several years, novice restaurateurs Caroline and Dave struggle to keep their small business afloat. They face real estate troubles, money issues, unreliable contractors, fires in the kitchen and staffing problems. Each has given up a successful career, putting their life savings, relationship and mental health on the line in order to share their passion for vegetarian cuisine.

== Hosts ==
Caroline Ishii developed a passion for food and cooking as a child. Through her mother's influence she learned traditional Japanese cooking. As her food pallet cultivated, so did her development and belief in holistic approaches to wellness which led her to the practices of Yoga and Meditation. In Dave she found a kindred spirit sharing the dream of opening a restaurant. With Dave's encouragement, she enrolled in the Professional Chef Training Program with New York City's famed Natural Gourmet Institute for Health and Culinary Arts. After completing her studies and with some of the best natural food chefs in NYC and San Francisco, Caroline returned to Ottawa to open ZenKitchen. She is a member of various food organizations such as The National Capital Vegetarian Association, Just Food Ottawa, and The Toronto Vegetarian Association.

David Loan grew up surrounded by the fruit orchards, family farms and vineyards of the Niagara Peninsula. Cooking became a fast hobby at a young age for Dave as his parents introduced him to two different yet influential approaches to food; his mother being the exquisite baker and his father being the culinary experimenter. In 1996, he met Caroline at a leap year party. A shared passion for cooking and eating nurtured their relationship and sparked the vision of owning a restaurant. Five years later, Dave committed to vegetarianism and has not looked back since. Dining experiences at high end vegan restaurants influenced his and Caroline's decision to open ZenKitchen creating their unique approach to vegan cooking. Dave's background as a political organizer lends strength to the management side of the business allowing Caroline to focus on the food. Dave is currently studying for his sommelier certification.

== Episodes ==
No.	Title	Directed by	Written by	Original release date
1	"Location, Location, Location"	Tim Alp, Sue Stranks	Tim Alp, Marisa Fusaro, Sue Stranks	January 6, 2010
Caroline and Dave prepare a final catering gig as part of their small scale catering business. However, it’s not the last meal they will serve as they plan to branch out of the catering business to open their own gourmet vegan restaurant. They soon hit their first road block when they can’t find an appropriate location for the restaurant. It goes from bad to worse when the bank tells the couple that they are not eligible for the loan that they applied for, but they forge ahead with their search and eventually find the perfect place. Things begin to look up after a last minute offer from a different bank keeps the dream alive, but the good news is short lived when Caroline is given some bad news about her father.
2	"Not All That Glitters"	Sue Stranks	Tim Alp, Marisa Fusaro, Sue Stranks	January 6, 2010
Just as Caroline and Dave finally put in an offer to purchase a turn-key restaurant, Caroline has to rush out of town to take care of her sick father. When Dave and Caroline’s offer is accepted, Caroline arrives back in town just in time for the building inspection and discovers all kinds of problems with the location. Then, she’s off to New York City to attend vegan baking classes and Dave is left once again to handle the stress and problems as he negotiates the lease on his own. Caroline returns from New York a certified vegan baker and learns that she and Dave are now the proud owners of what will become ZenKitchen. During their celebratory dinner Caroline and Dave get into a heated debate over who should be the ‘boss’ in this new partnership.
3	"Gimme the Money, Honey"	Sue Stranks	Tim Alp, Marisa Fusaro, Sue Stranks	January 13, 2010
Caroline and Dave put on a fundraising event where they sell gift certificates to raise money for a much needed renovation. The night is a success as they raise over $10,000, but Caroline and Dave quickly disagree on how to spend the money. Caroline starts flexing her authority as the Chef and Dave pushes for a new bar and wine cooler. To make matters worse, their designer and contractor don’t see eye to eye with each other on the design plan. With the project already $30,000 over budget, tensions between the couple escalate as they are forced to re-mortgage their home and sell their car to make up the shortfall.
4	"Tempers Flare"	Sue Stranks, Kevin Burton	Tim Alp, Marisa Fusaro, Sue Stranks	January 13, 2010
Caroline finally turns her attention to menu planning with the help of her sous-chef Kyle. The hiring process begins as Dave puts pressure on potential candidates by asking them to balance a full tray and recite daily specials during their interviews. Caroline and Kyle come up with a “sniff” test where potential kitchen staff must identify common ingredients by smell alone. Meanwhile, the restaurant renovations drag on with missed deadlines and an AWOL contractor, leading Dave to completely lose his cool. With only two weeks until the grand opening, no one is sure whether or not they will be ready in time and with the mounting pile of bills, Caroline and Dave are at their wits’ end.
5	"The Final Countdown"	Sue Stranks	Tim Alp, Marisa Fusaro, Sue Stranks	January 20, 2010
The final countdown is on! Caroline and Dave are in the final stages of prepping for ZenKitchen’s grand opening. They gather their newly assembled staff to tackle the long to-do lists for both the kitchen and the dining room to be ready for their first customers. Caroline reviews her menu with Kyle and Dave who don’t seem to agree on anything. Disagreements continue between the designer and contractor and the occupancy permit from the City is still outstanding with less than 24 hours to opening! The Zen of ZenKitchen has been replaced by stress and tension; Caroline wonders if the installation of a Buddha over the bar will help bring it back.
6	"Opening Night"	Sue Stranks	Tim Alp, Marisa Fusaro, Sue Stranks	January 20, 2010
The big day is finally here! As the countdown continues, the grand opening of ZenKitchen is just hours away. Caroline, Dave and Kyle have been burning the midnight oil to get all the finishing touches done in time. Everyone’s exhausted and the restaurant isn’t even open yet! Dave’s front of house staff struggle to activate the brand new credit/debit machine and to make sense of the on-line reservation system. Dave realizes that his staff knows more about running a restaurant than he does. In the kitchen, Kyle is furiously unpacking boxes looking for plates for that night’s dinner service. Caroline rushes upstairs to the office to finish the menus minutes before the grand opening. The missing menu has been a source of stress for everyone. When the clock strikes five the doors open and the first dinner guests trickle in. Eventually, the night picks up and the restaurant gets slammed! Throughout the busy night, Caroline and Dave witness Kyle snap at his fellow kitchen staff and bark at the servers. In the face of a hugely successful opening night, Caroline and Dave are left wondering where the Zen has gone.
7	"The Morning After"	Sue Stranks	Tim Alp, Marisa Fusaro, Sue Stranks	January 27, 2010
Over morning coffee, an exhausted Caroline and Dave re-hash a few problems from opening night. The list grows longer and longer but they both agree on the biggest issue: Kyle. Caroline and Dave meet with Kyle that afternoon to attempt to get him back on side. They don’t want him snapping at the staff. Caroline reminds Kyle that when he took this job, he agreed to adopt her Zen philosophy and leave his hierarchical kitchen management style behind. Returning to his daunting list of prep work in the kitchen, Kyle admits that he’s not sure the restaurant can run smoothly with Caroline’s approach. More issues crop up as ZenKitchen’s doors open for a second night: a leaky basement forces them to move their stored wine; the computer ordering system goes haywire, overstaffing leaves the servers wondering if they’ll make enough money, and an electrical problem prompts an emergency late night call to an electrician. All of this starts to take its toll on Caroline and Dave and they’ve only been up and running for two days!
8	"Zen? Kitchen"	Sue Stranks	Tim Alp, Marisa Fusaro, Sue Stranks	January 27, 2010
It’s the first day off since ZenKitchen opened but there is no rest for Caroline and Dave. The chaotic first days of dinner service have left them with so much to do. They rush to replenish the restaurant’s supplies, finish installing wine racks and deal with all the other organizational hiccups that have cropped up. The next night has the servers frustrated once again. They are overstaffed and concerns over tips grow. In the kitchen, the tension between Caroline and Kyle reaches the breaking point leading them to have it out in front of the staff. Dave’s attempts to intervene only result in ramping things up even further. Despite a full dining room and great sales, Caroline and Dave are struggling to keeps things under control at ZenKitchen. Caroline laments the loss of her humanistic loving approach and Dave begins to wonder if some hard decisions are in ZenKitchen’s future.
9	"The Review"	Sue Stranks	Tim Alp, Marisa Fusaro, Sue Stranks	February 3, 2010
Caroline walks us through her approach to cooking as she whips up her famous ravioli. She starts with fresh, local organic ingredients and combines different flavors and textures to tap into the spirit and energy of the food. This special care is part of every dish at ZenKitchen, but tonight some extra care is taken as the staff prepare for their first visit from a food critic. Everyone is nervous in anticipation of the critic. Caroline, Dave and even Kyle put their differences aside to work as a team. The critic’s dining experience goes well, but the nervousness continues until the review is printed in the paper days later.
10	"Trading Places"	Sue Stranks	Tim Alp, Marisa Fusaro, Sue Stranks	February 3, 2010
After an evening of being short staffed, Caroline and Dave decide that they need some cross training between kitchen staff positions. And the training is not just limited to staff, Caroline works on the line for the first time and manages to surprise Kyle with how well she handles the heat. Caroline spends her only day off travelling to Toronto to visit with her Dad. They spend time at the Japanese Cultural Center which brings up bittersweet memories of the times spent there with her mother. Once back in Ottawa, Dave and Caroline are visited by Dave’s mom, but it’s not just a social call. Dave has enlisted her pie making skills to show Caroline a thing or two. Once the pie making extravaganza is done, Dave’s Mom puts her meat and potato tastes aside to reluctantly sample the ZenKitchen vegan fare. The next night, Dave dons some chef whites to take control of the kitchen, so that Caroline can spend time in the dining room sharing a meal with her niece. Dining as a customer, Caroline gains a new perspective on ZenKitchen and returns to the kitchen at the end of the evening armed with a list of improvements.
11	"The Bickersons"	Sue Stranks	Tim Alp, Marisa Fusaro, Sue Stranks	February 10, 2010
After two months with little sleep and a lot of stress Caroline and Dave have hit a wall in their relationship and they are bickering more than ever. Before things go completely off the rails, they decide to take a weekend away to recharge and get their relationship back on track. They head off to Montreal for a lover’s getaway. The love spreads once they get back to work as Dave starts planning a surprise party for Caroline’s birthday. Caroline sulks her way through the workday thinking that her special day has been forgotten, while all their staff and friends are in on the surprise!
12	"The Last Straw"	Sue Stranks	Tim Alp, Marisa Fusaro, Sue Stranks	February 10, 2010
Despite the love swirling around ZenKitchen, Caroline has had just about all she can take of her clashes with Kyle. All the staff at ZenKitchen set about prepping for a record number of reservations for that evening. Kyle ruffles her feathers for the last time. One hour away from service, the kitchen is nowhere near ready for the impending rush. Kyle blames Caroline’s absence from the kitchen. And Caroline and Dave clearly see fault in Kyle’s lack of focus and time management. Things reach the boiling point with Kyle needing to go for a walk to blow off steam. The fighting continues until Dave threatens to toss Kyle from the kitchen. In the end, Caroline and Dave decide they have to let Kyle go. The entire staff is shocked to hear the news. Kyle counts down the hours and minutes of his last shift, sagely doling out advice to his former kitchen colleagues and wishing much success to Dave and Caroline who surprise him with a gift and a toast of thanks before his teary eyed farewell.
13	"Payday"	Sue Stranks, Matt West	Tim Alp, Marisa Fusaro, Sue Stranks	February 17, 2010
ZenKitchen continues with its success despite losing sous chef Kyle. Caroline and Dave decide to raise ZenKitchen’s profile by participating in some community fundraising events. They each take a turn peddling their wares out on the town leaving the other back at the restaurant to keep things under control. Caroline jokes that this is the first time they’ve ever split up in their 11year relationship. Love is once again on everyone’s mind when an engagement party is held at ZenKitchen. Caroline is gushing over the party, but Dave stays back taking it all in. He starts to wonder if this is the time to make his union with Caroline official. Is an engagement ring in order? Either way, Caroline and Dave have good reason to celebrate. After meeting with their bookkeeper they are surprised to learn they can afford to pay themselves for the first time. Caroline signs Dave’s first cheque and Dave signs Caroline’s. The business relationship is a success. Will their personal relationship follow?

== Awards ==
Year	Nominee / work	Award	Result
2010	The Restaurant Adventures of Caroline & Dave	Gemini Award, Category: Best Original Music for a Lifestyle/Practical Information or Reality Program or Series - David Burns "Episode 12 The Last Straw"	Nominated
2010	The Restaurant Adventures of Caroline & Dave	Summit Awards (SCA), Category: Editing/Effects - MC Gagnon "Episode 12 The Last Straw"	Won Bronze

== International Syndication ==
Country / Region	Name	Television Network	Dubbing / Subtitles
Canada	The Restaurant Adventures of Caroline & Dave	OWN Canada	English
Canada	The Restaurant Adventures of Caroline & Dave	Asian Food Channel	English
