= CTV2 Alberta =

CTV2 cable channel in the province of Alberta

- Country: Canada
- Broadcast area: Alberta
- Network: CTV2; Former affiliations: Independent (1973–2011) (see below)
- Headquarters: Edmonton, Alberta

Programming
- Picture format: 480i (SDTV); 1080i (HDTV)

Ownership
- Owner: Bell Media
- Sister channels: CFRN-DT, CFCN-DT

History
- Launched: June 30, 1973
- Former names: Access (1973–2011); CTV Two Alberta (2011–2018)

Links
- Website: CTV2 Alberta

CJAL-TV and CIAN-TV
CJAL-TV: Edmonton, Alberta; CIAN-TV: Calgary, Alberta; Canada
- Channels for CJAL-TV: Analog: 9 (VHF)
- Channels for CIAN-TV: Analog: 13 (VHF)
- Branding: Access

Programming
- Affiliations: Independent

Ownership
- Owner: Bell Media; (Learning and Skills Television of Alberta Limited)
- Sister stations: CFRN-TV, CFCN-TV

History
- First air date: CJAL-TV: December 1, 1986; CIAN-TV: January 9, 1984
- Last air date: August 31, 2011; (transmitters terminated)
- Call sign meaning: CJAL-TV: Alberta; CIAN-TV: Access Network

Technical information
- ERP: CJAL-TV: 15 kW; CIAN-TV: 9.9 kW
- HAAT: CJAL-TV: 168.1 m (552 ft); CIAN-TV: 246.3 m (808 ft)
- Transmitter coordinates: CJAL-TV: 53°24′19″N 113°20′42″W; CIAN-TV: 51°3′53″N 114°12′51″W

CTV2 Alberta is a Canadian English-language entertainment and former educational television channel in the province of Alberta. Owned by the Bell Media subsidiary of BCE Inc., it is a de facto owned-and-operated station of its secondary CTV2 television system.

The channel was licensed by the Canadian Radio-television and Telecommunications Commission (CRTC) as an educational programming service for Alberta, and was formerly a public broadcaster owned by the Alberta provincial government. Following its privatization in 1995, its licence continued to require at least 60 hours of non-commercial educational programming per week along with entertainment programming more favourable to advertisers and adult viewers. In 2017, the channel officially relinquished its status as an educational broadcaster and dropped all its previous educational programming except the newsmagazine Alberta Primetime.

CTV2 Alberta is also designated as a "satellite-to-cable undertaking" serving the entirety of Alberta, and is therefore carried throughout the province on cable and licensed IPTV services on each service's basic tier. It is also available on both national satellite services.

== History ==
Access's logo from the 1970s

Access's previous logo from 2008 to 2011, designed to resemble the logo used by the "A" system. Access also aired limited programming from "A" during this period.

The channel was launched on June 30, 1973 as Access. It was owned by the Alberta Educational Communications Corporation (AECC), a Crown corporation of the Government of Alberta that also operated CKUA Radio. Prior to this point, English-language educational programs aired on Radio-Canada's television station CBXFT in Edmonton.

For its first decade, Access was only available through cable, and did not broadcast over-the-air. It competed with KSPS-TV in Spokane, Washington, a member of the American Public Broadcasting Service (PBS) that was available on cable in most of the province.

On January 9, 1984, AECC was granted a licence from the CRTC for a terrestrial television station in Calgary, CIAN-TV, to rebroadcast the Access cable feed. on December 1, 1986, AECC was granted another licence for a television station in Edmonton, CJAL-TV, to serve as a satellite of CIAN.

After re-evaluating all provincial funding recipients, the Government of Alberta announced in 1993 that it would cease to directly fund Access past 1994. As a result, in 1995, Access was privatized and sold to Learning and Skills Television of Alberta Limited (LSTA), which was 60% owned by CHUM Limited. In February 2005, CHUM Limited acquired the remaining 40% interest in LSTA (and renamed it Access Media Group), giving the company 100% of its shares, including its ownership in Access.

On July 12, 2006, CTVglobemedia announced that it would make a friendly takeover bid to buy CHUM Limited. Due to CTVglobemedia's plans to keep CTV and Citytv, Rogers Communications was expected to purchase Access (along with CHUM's A-Channel stations, CKX-TV in Brandon, Canadian Learning Television and SexTV: The Channel) as announced on April 9, 2007, pending CRTC approval (and approval of CTVglobemedia's purchase).

With the CRTC electing to force CTV to sell the Citytv stations instead, the Rogers deal was rendered void. As such, CTVglobemedia retained Access along with the A-Channel stations, CKX-TV and all of CHUM's specialty channels, and sold the Citytv stations to Rogers. The takeover transaction was finalized on June 22, 2007. The A-Channel stations were rebranded as "A" on August 11, 2008; on the same date, Access debuted a new A-styled logo and began airing programming from "A" during certain prime time hours.

On June 8, 2011, it was revealed that Access would be relaunched as CTV Two Alberta on August 29, 2011, as part of a rebranding of the "A" system.

On January 11, 2016, during CTV2 Alberta's licence renewal, Bell Media (a successor to CTVglobemedia) requested that the channel no longer be classified as an educational broadcaster. The company stated that the province would be better served with both a dedicated educational broadcaster alongside a private service. Despite receiving criticism from a number of groups, most notably from Ontario educational broadcaster TVO, the CRTC approved the request on May 15, 2017, citing the lack of intervention from the provincial government, as well as talks between the government and British Columbia's Knowledge Network to potentially launch a new publicly owned and operated educational broadcast service in Alberta. As a result, CTV2 Alberta dropped all educational programming but continues to air the newsmagazine Alberta Primetime.

== Digital television ==
As part of Canada's transition to digital terrestrial television, broadcast television stations in Calgary and Edmonton were required to convert to digital broadcasting or sign off completely by August 31, 2011. Prior to this deadline, Access' only over-the-air transmitters were located in Calgary and Edmonton.

As Access/CTV2 was licensed as a satellite-to-cable undertaking, it was not required to offer over-the-air transmitters. Due to this, the costs of converting the two Access transmitters in Calgary and Edmonton to digital, and because the network already must be carried by cable and IPTV providers in the area as the province's designated educational broadcaster, CTV2 shut down its over-the-air television transmitters on August 31, 2011.

== Programming ==
As Access, the network carried a variety of educational and informative programs along with entertainment programs all of which include children's programs, documentaries, feature films, talk shows, dramas, comedies and other programs. Starting March 9, 2009, Access began cabling a province-wide news and current affairs magazine program called Alberta Primetime, from the CTV/Access studios in Edmonton. Resources from CTV's owned-and-operated stations in Edmonton (CFRN-DT) and Calgary (CFCN-DT) are used to produce the program.

Former logo. Used from 2011 to 2018.

CTV2 Alberta dropped all children's and educational programming from its schedule (including archival Access Network programming) when it ceased being licensed as an educational broadcaster in 2017. It now airs the full CTV2 schedule with the exception of the provincial newsmagazine Alberta Primetime.

== See also ==
- CTV2 Atlantic – a similar cable-only affiliate of CTV2 in Atlantic Canada; formerly the Atlantic Satellite Network (ASN) and A Atlantic
- Citytv Saskatchewan – a similar cable-only affiliate of Citytv in the Canadian province of Saskatchewan; formerly Saskatchewan Communications Network
- The CW Plus – an alternate feed of The CW Television Network for small and mid-size television markets in the United States, made up of privately owned digital multicast channels and cable-only affiliates, with syndicated programs supplied by the network in addition to CW network programming
