= Life Is Messy (TV series) =

Canadian reality television series

Life Is Messy is a Canadian reality television series, which premiered in 2026 on Home Network. Hosted by Kortney Wilson and Kenny Brain following the end of production on their prior series Making it Home with Kortney and Kenny, the series features the duo helping homeowners whose living spaces have become badly cluttered to improve their quality of life by decluttering the home and building new, improved storage and organization solutions.

Production and casting for the show were first announced in 2024.

The series premiered on April 9, 2026.
