= Save Us from Our House =

- Starring: Hina Khan; Scott Puddicombe; Dylan Marcel
- Country of origin: Canada

Production
- Running time: Approx. 30 minutes

Original release
- Network: W Network (Canada); HGTV (United States)
- Release: 2005 – 2010

Save Us From Our House! is a Canadian reality series, which premiered on W Network in Canada in 2005. The series was produced by General Purpose Pictures.

The program focused on families who were suffering interpersonal tensions due to their living spaces. A licensed psychotherapist (Hina Khan) counseled the family through their relationship difficulties, while a construction contractor (Scott Puddicombe in the first season, Dylan Marcel for the remainder of the series) remodeled the home into a more welcoming and family-oriented living space.

The series also aired on HGTV in the United States.

The program's theme song was an instrumental portion of Spirit of the West's 1990 single "Save This House".
