= Access Media Group =

Media Company

Learning and Skills Television of Alberta Ltd.
- Trade name: Access Media Group
- Company type: Broadcasting/Multimedia
- Industry: Media
- Founded: Edmonton, Alberta (1994)
- Defunct: 2008 (independent); April 16, 2020 (dissolved)
- Fate: Subsumed into Bell Media
- Successor: Bell Media Television
- Headquarters: Edmonton, Alberta, Canada
- Products: Media, Broadcasting
- Owner: BCE, Inc.
- Parent: Bell Media

Access Media Group, legally Learning and Skills Television of Alberta Ltd., which also served as the corporate brand until 2005, was a privately held Canadian broadcasting and multimedia group based in Edmonton, Alberta, Canada specializing in learning-based media, originally majority-owned (and later wholly owned) by CHUM Limited. It owned four television channels, a multimedia distribution company, and a school for continuing education and personal growth. AMG's headquarters are situated at Enterprise Square in Edmonton, Alberta.

At the time of the company's founding in 1994, it was 60% owned by CHUM Limited. On February 15, 2005, CHUM purchased the remainder of the company. The company had been owned by CTVglobemedia (later became as Bell Media since June 22, 2007 as a result of its takeover of CHUM; and AMG was wound up into CTV Limited (the renamed CHUM Limited) in 2008. CTVglobemedia continued to own the majority of AMG's assets, broadcasting and otherwise.

BookTelevision and CourtTV Canada was relocated to the CTVglobemedia headquarters in Toronto, Ontario while Access TV was relocated to CFRN-TV's studios.

CTVglobemedia was acquired by Bell Canada in 2011 resulting in the company renamed into Bell Media. AMG continued to exist within Bell Media's corporate structures until its dissolution on April 16, 2020, when Bell Media reorganized its subsidiaries into Bell Media Television.

== Assets prior to dissolution ==
All assets remain under the ownership of CTVglobemedia (now Bell Media) unless otherwise noted.

=== Television stations ===
- Access (renamed to CTV 2 Alberta, all educational programming was eliminated in 2017)
- BookTelevision (shut down in February 2021)
- Canadian Learning Television (sold to Corus Entertainment in 2008, renamed to Oprah Winfrey Network and shut down in 2024)
- CourtTV Canada (became Investigation Discovery in 2010, relaunched as Oxygen in 2025)

=== Distribution ===
- Distribution Access (bought out by management in 2009)

=== Continuing education ===
- The Learning Annex of Canada (70%) (website now redirects to TLA's corporate site, implying that TLAC may now be wholly owned by the U.S. company)
- TLAC Toronto Printing which is a growing Canadian Printing company for businesses and self publishers is not a division of Access Media.
- ideaCity, an annual conference of forward-thinkers held in Toronto (now directly managed by Moses Znaimer)
