= SexTV =

Canadian television series

- Genre: Documentary, sexuality
- Created by: Moses Znaimer
- Country of origin: Canada
- Original language: English

Original release
- Network: Citytv; CHUM Limited
- Release: 1998 – 2008

SexTV is a Canadian documentary television series that aired on Citytv and later CHUM Limited's channels in a late-night time slot and was produced at the network's Toronto building at 299 Queen Street West. It also aired internationally in syndication and eventually aired on other channels owned by CHUM Limited such as NewNet and CP24 that explored a diverse range of topics related to human sexuality and gender. Created by the Canadian media executive Moses Znaimer, the documentary-series premiered in 1999 on national broadcast television and ran for ten seasons, concluding in 2008. The SexTV brand, as of 2026, is currently owned by Corus Entertainment.

The series used Leonard Cohen's song, "Ain't No Cure for Love", as its theme music; Cohen and Znaimer were friends.

The doc-series was described as feminist, ethnographic and part of the sex-positive movement. Over the course of its run, the show was acclaimed by critics and academics, receiving eight Gemini Award nominations (now called Canadian Screen Awards) and winning Best Lifestyle/General Interest Series at the 19th Gemini Awards in 2004. SexTV was known as its first broadcast television program to explore gender and sexuality around the world covering an extensive range of subjects from female masturbation (featuring the "godmother of masturbation" Dr. Betty Dodson) to the controversial medical treatment of children who are born intersex.

With the increasing popularity of the show and the move to digital television, a documentary television channel called SexTV: The Channel was launched in 2001.
