= Kenny Brain =

Canadian television personality

Kenny Brain (born August 26, 1988) is a Canadian television personality, best known as cohost with Kortney Wilson of the HGTV Canada home renovation series Making it Home with Kortney and Kenny. The series is no longer in production, with the duo launching a new series, Life Is Messy, in 2026.

Originally from Grand Falls-Windsor, Newfoundland and Labrador, Brain worked as a model before competing in the second season of Big Brother Canada in 2014. Although openly gay in real life and honest about his sexuality in viewer confessionals, he initially pursued a strategy of remaining closeted among his housemates; although he did come out to housemate Sarah Miller a few weeks into the season, his strategy sparked some viewer and media debate about whether his choice was sending a message to viewers that being gay could be seen as a shameful secret. He and Miller were both voted out of the Big Brother house on Day 43. He has also since stated that his decision to stay in the closet at first, and come out as gay once the season was underway, helped to spark a valuable conversation about homophobia and the differing standards to which gay and straight people are held.

After appearing on Big Brother Canada, Brain quit modelling and trained as a construction contractor, later launching his own contracting business in Vancouver, British Columbia. Following Wilson's divorce from her former husband and business partner Dave Wilson, Brain debuted as the new cohost of Making it Home in the show's second season in 2021. He has stated that one of his goals as a home renovation host is to provide a positive role model for LGBTQ representation and inclusion in construction trades.
