= Ayr, Ontario =

Ayr
- Unincorporated community
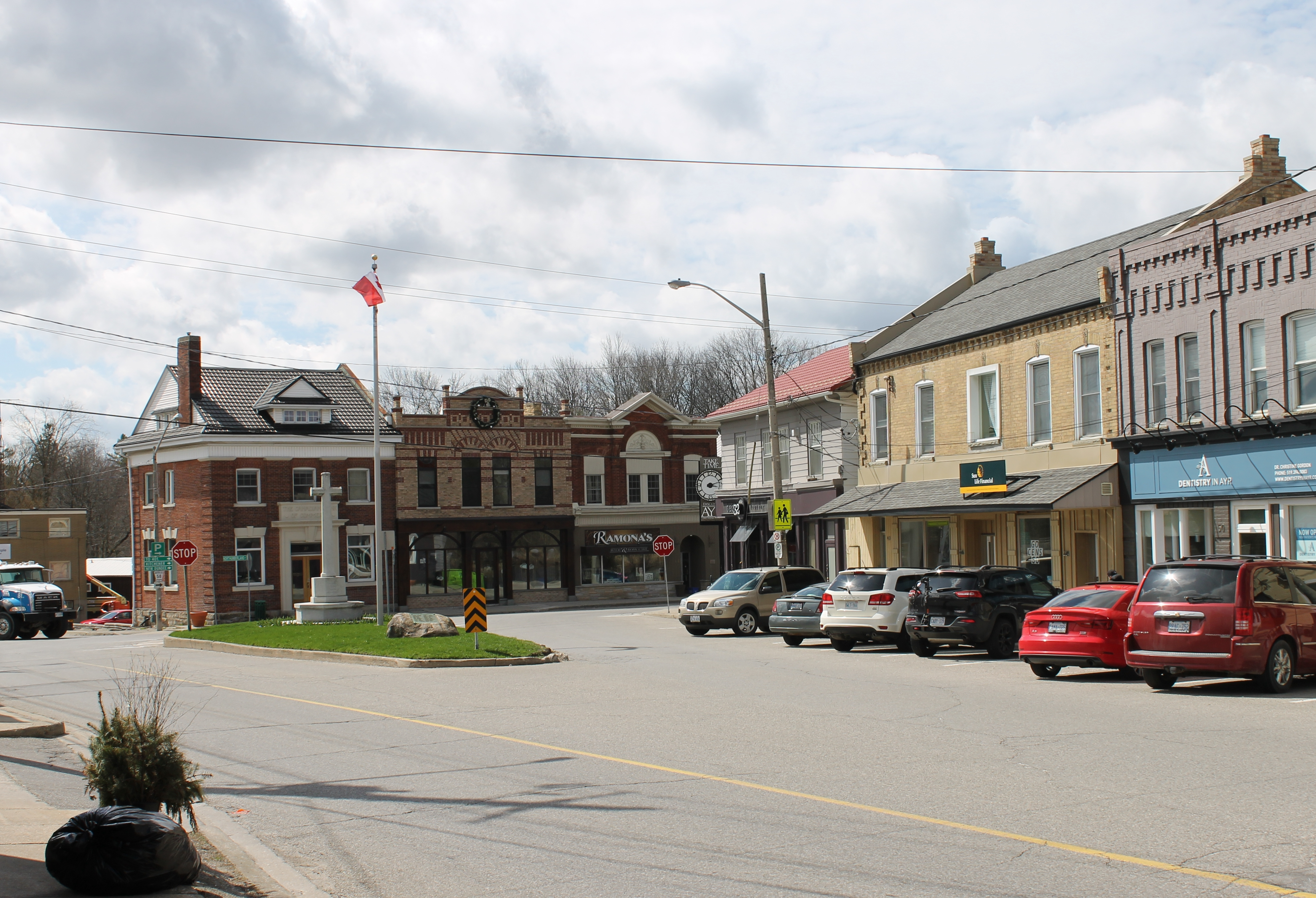
- Downtown Ayr

- Location within Regional Municipality of Waterloo Location within Southern Ontario
- Coordinates: 43°17′8″N 80°27′0″W
- Country: Canada
- Province: Ontario
- Regional municipality: Waterloo
- Township: North Dumfries
- Settled: 1824

Area
  - Total: 5.76 km^{2} (2.22 sq mi)

Population (2021)
  - Total: 5,383
  - Density: 934.4/km^{2} (2,420/sq mi)
- Time zone: UTC-5 (EST)
  - Summer (DST): UTC-4 (EDT)
- Forward sortation area: N0B 1E0
- Area codes: 519, 226 and 548
- NTS Map: 040P08
- GNBC Code: FEGAH

Ayr is a community in Ontario, Canada that is located within the Township of North Dumfries in the Regional Municipality of Waterloo in Southwestern Ontario. Ayr is located south of Kitchener and west of Cambridge.

== History ==
The village later to be called Ayr, on the Nith River, was originally a group of settlements, Mudge's Mills in the centre, Jedburgh to the east and Nithvale to the west, that eventually combined into one as they expanded. The name Ayr was first used in 1840 when it was assigned to the post office.

The territory in this area, eventually to be the township of North Dumfries, consisting of 94,305 acres, had been sold to Philip Stedman in 1798 from Joseph Brant of the Six Nations. Ownership transferred to Thomas Clarke and then in 1816 to William Dickson a wealthy immigrant from Scotland.

Absalom Shade was the only individual land owner in the area of the junction of Smith's Creek (now the Nith River) and Cedar Creek in 1822 and the first actual settler was Abel Mudge, initially as a squatter. He built a dam, a sawmill and a grist mill. The Nith River and Cedar Creek were useful for powering mills. Most subsequent settlers at Mudge's Mills were Scottish, farmers, artisans or tradesmen.

Jedburgh was founded by John Hall from Scotland in 1832. He built a flour mill and a distillery. Nithvale was founded during the early 1830s when a flour mill and two sawmills were opened but little information remains from that era. Hall opened a flour mill and a distillery nearby in 1832.

The settlement at Mudge's Mill was laid out by James Jackson, the first settler, with J. R. Andrews, and Robert Wylie in 1839. The name Ayr was chosen by Wylie after his hometown of Ayr, Scotland; Wylie served as the community's second postmaster after Jackson. The other two settlements were not a part of Ayr but received their mail at the single post office. The Smith's Canadian Gazetteer of 1846 describes Ayr, population 230, as containing two churches, a post office receiving mail once a week and businesses such as a grist mill, fulling mill and carding machine, a tannery, two stores, a blacksmith, two shoemakers, two tailors, one cooper and two carpenters.

The Ayr Agricultural Works was founded in 1847 by John Watson from Scotland. It originally manufactured iron pots and stoves but expanded into agricultural machinery in the 1880s. In 1882, a new, four storey factory was built, making the company the largest agricultural works in Canada at that time. The company was renamed the John Watson Manufacturing Company in 1884. It ceased to operate in 1991.

By 1848 the population of Ayr was 700. In the next few years a newspaper and library were operating. The town-hall was built in 1850. A large furniture factory also opened at about the same time. There were also five flour mills in the three communities that later formed Ayr, a very large sawmill and a woolen mill by then. Watson's company was very successful, shipping agricultural implements across the country by 1864. By 1850, a good road to Galt had been built and a railway had reached Galt, some distance from Ayr. During that time, goods for export were taken by ox carts to the train station at Paris, Ontario. The town hall was built in 1850 and a fire department was started the same year.

By 1854, the village had a small library, two school houses, a fire company, a newspaper and a single (Presbyterian) church. In addition to the major farm implements manufacturer, other businesses that were operating in 1864 included grist and saw mills, five flour mills, a woollen mill, stores and a furniture factory. The population was 1000, there were five churches, a fire company, a weekly newspaper and a large school with students from primary to senior level.

The village got a rail line from the Credit Valley Railway in 1879, which helped facilitate the importing and exporting of goods. Jedburg and Nithvale were absorbed into Ayr in 1884 when the village was incorporated, with foundry owner John Watson as the first Reeve.

By 1888, the streets were lit with coal oil lamps and concrete sidewalks were installed in 1901. A large library was built in 1909 with funds provided by a Carnegie grant. Ayr was declining by around 1910 and some of the population moved to nearby Berlin and Preston. Starting in the 1950s and still continuing, new homes were built for commuters, helping to increase the population.

In January 1973, Ayr was incorporated into the Township of North Dumfries and the Regional Municipality of Waterloo.

On the morning of August 17, 2024, the town was hit by a EF2 tornado that damaged multiple homes, buildings, businesses, vehicles, as well as overturning rail cars.

== Sports ==
Ayr Centennials Home Game

Ayr is home to the Ayr Centennials, a junior hockey team in the Greater Ontario Hockey League, and the Ayr Curling Club

== Community buildings ==
The newest major addition to the village of Ayr is the North Dumfries Community Complex; major construction was completed in 2011.

== Education ==
The community of Ayr is served by three publicly funded elementary schools. Built in 1890, Ayr public school was the area's first school for nearly a century. The school's current population of 200 ranges from Junior Kindergarten to Grade 6, feeding into Cedar Creek Public School. St. Brigid Catholic Elementary School was opened in 1998 to serve the students from kindergarten to Grade 8 The most recent school of the three, Cedar Creek public school first opened its doors in 1999; currently serving 460 students in Junior Kindergarten to Grade 8.

As Ayr does not have a high school, most of the community's students attend school in Cambridge. Graduates of Cedar Creek Public School will go on to attend Southwood Secondary School; while catholic students will attend Monsignor Doyle Catholic Secondary School.

== TV and movies ==
- Sketches of Our Town, a half-hour Canadian documentary series from the mid 80s and early 90s, featured Ayr in one of their episodes.
- The 2003 movie Cold Creek Manor, starring Dennis Quaid, Sharon Stone, Stephen Dorff and Juliette Lewis, was filmed in Ayr.
- Blood and Guts (film), the 1978 Paul Lynch film had scenes shot inside of an Ayr pub. Lynch also used the town for The Hard Part Begins five years prior.
- Portions of the film How To Lose A Guy In 10 Days were filmed in downtown Ayr.
- The Stephen King miniseries 11/22/63, starring James Franco, was filmed in and around Ayr and the Township of North Dumfries
- Numerous scenes for Murdoch Mysteries Season 9 Episode 6 were shot in Ayr
- Scenes for Impulse (TV series) were filmed in downtown Ayr

== Notable people ==
- Kyle Clifford, ice hockey player, two time Stanley Cup champion
- John Goldie, Scottish-born botanist, founder of the adjacent hamlet Greenfield
- William Goldie, physician and lecturer at the University of Toronto
- Will Kidman, musician, best known for role in Canadian rock band Constantines
- Joseph Kilgour, early twentieth century stage and film actor
- Henry Maracle, Mohawk hockey player born in Ayr who played for the New York Rangers in 1931, controversially viewed as potentially the first Indigenous NHLer
- Dean Prentice, ice hockey player, 22 years in the NHL with the New York Rangers, Boston Bruins, Detroit Red Wings, Pittsburgh Penguins and Minnesota North Stars
- Don Thomson Jr., racing driver
- Jay Wells, ice hockey player, Stanley Cup champion with the New York Rangers in 1994
- Kortney Wilson, country music singer and star of the HGTV Show Masters of Flip along with her husband Dave

== See also ==
- List of population centres in Ontario
- List of unincorporated communities in Ontario
