= Be Real with JR Digs =

- Genre: Reality
- Created by: Tim Alp
- Directed by: Kevin Burton
- Starring: JR Digs
- Theme music composer: Bartmart Audio
- Country of origin: Canada
- Original language: English
- No. of seasons: 1
- No. of episodes: 13

Production
- Executive producer: Tim Alp
- Production location: Ontario, Canada
- Running time: 22 minutes
- Production company: Mountain Road Productions

Original release
- Network: TVtropolis
- Release: September 20, 2006

Be Real with JR Digs was a 13-part Canadian reality television series which premiered on September 20, 2006, on TV Tropolis. It was produced by Mountain Road Productions. The premise of the show was "turning regular people's ordinary lives into their very own reality TV show". The series was cancelled after 13 episodes.

== Synopsis ==
The show was described by host J.R. Digs as "playing mentor" to young filmmakers. Seemingly random people were chosen to be a "reality TV star" and accompanied on a regular day. According to the production company, there were no plans, no scripts and no pre-production before filming.

== Episodes ==
No.	Title	Directed by	Original release date
1	"A Fare to Remember"	Kevin Burton	September 20, 2006
JR looks for his reality star on the streets of Guelph, and finds a cab driver named Scott. The day starts with JR directing Scott as he looks to buy a rental property with his wheeling and dealing realtor. Then it's off to work, as we meet the wild cast of characters who ride in his taxi. The night only gets stranger as it progresses.
2	"Woman on Top"	Kevin Burton	September 27, 2006
JR searches for his talent in the town of Perth. He finds Sue, a wife and mother who has just successfully finished entrepreneurial school. JR directs the graduation ceremony and then follows her home to celebrate. Upon his arrival, JR finds out that her husband may not be so happy with his wife's new direction in life.
3	"Farm Follies"	Kevin Burton	October 4, 2006
In Saint Jacobs, JR searches miles of rural roads looking for a farming Mennonite, but finds his next great reality star selling Chanel and Gucci at a farmer's market. He follows her as she closes down for the day and goes to pick up her pampered pooch. The action heats up when she takes a special interest in the young, strong farm boy next door—shades of Mrs. Robinson as JR directs her to ask for a glass of water to help cool herself down.
4	"Bridging the Gap"	Kevin Burton	October 11, 2006
While casting in Carleton Place, JR finds a grandfather visiting from Labrador to be his reality TV star. JR introduces his star to a crowd of adoring fans at the local Highland Games. Later, on the way to pick up pizza for a family dinner, an incident exposes a generation gap between the star and his grandson. JR takes on the challenge of helping his star to bridge the gap in one of the season's most emotionally charged episodes.
5	"Get a Job"	Kevin Burton	October 18, 2006
JR searches for his reality television star in downtown Ottawa, and finds a young woman struggling in search of a job, and in search of herself. JR takes on the role of friend and councilor, and with his guidance, she gets rid of her boyfriend, gets a make-over, and finds herself a job.
6	"Wrestling with Reality"	Kevin Burton	October 25, 2006
In the streets of Hamilton, JR finds an up-and-coming professional wrestler to be his next reality star. JR directs him as he goes through his training, including an urban workout on the streets of the city. Then it's into the ring, as JR helps his star find a signature move to unleash on an unsuspecting opponent. After that, JR introduces the city to his creation – "The Asian Nightmare" - and directs him on how to handle his adoring fans.
7	"Honeymoon Upgrade"	Kevin Burton	October 25, 2006
JR finds a newlywed couple to star in this honeymoon version of Be Real from Niagara Falls. Using the power of television, he moves them to the front of the line on the Maid of the Mist, gets them the best seats in town for dinner, arranges a fireworks display, and takes them on the wildest rides on the strip. Then it's back to their hotel room where things heat up with champagne and a dip in the hot tub to conclude their first-class honeymoon.
8	"The First Date"	Kevin Burton	October 25, 2006
In the lakefront town of Port Dalhousie, JR finds an aspiring pro beach volleyball player to be his reality star. The day starts with a match on the beach with his shirtless buddies - can you say "Top Gun?". Then JR directs the star through a wild first date that includes a sunset boat trip, two hippies and a bunny, and dinner at a Greek restaurant - complete with ouzo, dancing and plate breaking.
9	"I Do! I Don't!"	Kevin Burton	October 25, 2006
In Ottawa, JR finds a government worker on his way home from work. The episode comes to a screeching halt when his wife tosses the crew out of the house and lets him know that his reality TV debut is over. JR saves the show by finding a guy celebrating his last night of freedom with his friends before his wedding the next day. Go-Karts, mini putt, beer and women ensue. The episode continues the next day when JR attempts to crash the wedding.
10	"I Do! I Don't! DJ Remix"	Kevin Burton	October 25, 2006
In Kingston, JR meets a bride that agrees to have her wedding day turned into reality TV, but is soon stone-walled by the groom's family. He then hooks up with Mango, a rapper, actor and DJ. JR directs him as he advertises a gig that he's doing that night, then follows him back to his "crib" to lay down some new tracks for the show. Then it's off to the venue, where JR gets Mango to interact with his adoring fans and helps him turn his bar gig into the biggest show in town.
11	"Pink Bike No More"	Kevin Burton	October 25, 2006
JR searches for his star in the town of Picton. He finds Gregory, a shy kid in search of a job. JR helps him replace his pink bicycle at the hardware store, then helps give him the confidence to apply for a job while he is there. Gregory really breaks out of his shell when he learns to fly a kite. The day raps up as Gregory spends time at home with his family. A truly beautiful JR created moment!.
12	"Jumping the Shark"	Kevin Burton	October 25, 2006
JR searches for his next reality TV personality in Kitchener, and finds a Brazilian basketball player in town with the Brazilian women's Olympic basketball team. JR joins them as they prepare for an upcoming tournament. While directing her, JR learns that our star is recovering from an injury caused by a shark attack. He takes her from the basketball court to the weight room as she struggles through her pain to regain her form. Then JR directs her interaction with her teammates, as they break curfew to enjoy a night on the town Canadian style.
13	"Here, Mayor and Everywhere"	Kevin Burton	October 25, 2006
In Nappanee, JR finds a civic minded city worker with a full schedule. He helps her wrap up her day at the office, then directs her through a sequence that has her wake up her husband and get him off to work for his night shift. Then she checks out an Elvis impersonator who is playing a charity event she is organizing, and reports back to the mayor. She ends her busy day curled up in bed with her Saint Bernard—and JR of course.

== Awards ==
Year	Nominee / work	Award	Result
2007	Be Real with JR Digs	Summit Awards (SIA), Category: Movie/Film Music Website	Won Gold
2007	Be Real with JR Digs	Banff World Media Festival, Category: Hors Concours Selection for Reality Format Programs	Won
2007	Be Real with JR Digs	Gemini Award, Category: Best Host in a Lifestyle/Practical Information, or Performing Arts Program or Series – JR Digs	Nominated
