= Sheltered =

- Genre: Documentary
- Created by: Tim Alp, Jocelyn Rheaume
- Directed by: Dave Rheaume
- Starring: Derek Marsden
- Theme music composer: Bartmart Audio
- Country of origin: Canada
- Original language: English
- No. of seasons: 1
- No. of episodes: 4

Production
- Executive producer: Tim Alp
- Producers: Tim Alp, Jocelyn Rheaume
- Production locations: Peru, Costa Rica, Benin, Namibia
- Running time: 22 Minutes
- Production companies: Mountain Road Productions, Bossy Jossy Productions

Original release
- Network: Aboriginal Peoples Television Network
- Release: October 18, 2010

Sheltered (Brantley) is a 4-part documentary Canadian television series which premiered on October 20, 2010 on the Aboriginal Peoples Television Network. Co-produced by Mountain Road Productions and Bossy Jossy Productions the series follows Derek Marsden, an Ojibway carpenter, as he travels the world to learn the ancient home building techniques of the world's Indigenous and traditional cultures. His journey takes him to locations in Africa, Central and South America where he lives and works with people who are managing to maintain their customs and lifestyle.

== Synopsis ==
During his visits Derek stays in a structure similar to the one he is working on, spending time with a family and seeing how the shelter functions and shapes the lives of its occupants. He joins them at meals, in games and learns about their culture at the same time that he experiences what it’s like to build a home in a completely different way.

As Derek learns the construction techniques used to build the home, he also faces the challenges of learning to communicate in a foreign language and the lack of power tools. We see how he adapts to the ways of the locals, from mixing mud and straw by hand to hoisting stones with ropes and pulleys. In some cases, it’s how they've done it for thousands of years.

Through his exposure to other Indigenous and traditional cultures he gains insight into how his own people can re-connect to their traditional home building techniques and ultimately their traditional way of life.

Sheltered is an Aboriginal carpenter’s search for the missing links to his past.

== Documentary subject bio ==
Ojibway carpenter Derek Marsden was born and raised on the Alderville First Nations Reserve in south-central Ontario. He learned his carpentry skills working at the side of his grandfather from the time he was a young boy. He has earned a living by building and renovating modern homes for the last ten years. Derek was inspired to go on the Sheltered journey in an attempt to understand how other indigenous cultures have maintained their traditional ways and gain insight into how his own people can reconnect to their past.

== Episodes ==
No. overall	No. in season	Title	Directed by	Written by	Original release date
1	1	"Peru: The Journey Begins..."	Dave Rheaume	Tim Alp, Jocelyn Rheaume	October 18, 2010
We meet Derek Marsden, an Ojibway carpenter who packs up to leave his home reserve to explore other indigenous cultures and learn traditional house building techniques. His first stop is Lake Titicaca, Peru. These islands are inhabited by the very colourful Uros people. Derek is welcomed on the island by his host Hugo and his newly expanded family. Everything around him is made of reeds, including the island itself! Hugo teaches Derek how to build a traditional home from harvesting the reeds by boat to sewing reed mats for the roofing.
2	2	"Costa Rica: Work Work - Don't Be Lazy!"	Dave Rheaume	Tim Alp, Jocelyn Rheaume	October 25, 2010
Derek travels to Costa Rica. It is in this dense rain forest setting where the Bri Bri people build their homes using bamboo and vine. Derek is invited to live with Victor and his Bri Bri family in their home. He meets Armando, a village elder who teaches him how to build a traditional shelter just like the one he’s been living in. Armando is tireless and Derek has a hard time keeping up with him, whether carrying heavy loads of palm leaves on his back or learning to handle a machete. The language barrier doesn’t stop Derek and Armando from developing a lasting friendship.
3	3	"Bénin: Hot Enough For Ya?"	Dave Rheaume	Tim Alp, Jocelyn Rheaume, Dave Rheaume	November 1, 2010
Derek travels to the tiny, but bustling West-African country of Bénin. The Bètchabè people here live in three storey castle-like houses called Tata-Sombas. The heat and humidity are oppressive and Derek feels like he’s sleeping in an oven. The Tata-Sombas are made from clay and tree branches. He works on these homes in various stages of construction, alongside the villagers and experiences their joie de vivre first hand.
4	4	"Namibia: Women's Work!"	Dave Rheaume	Tim Alp, Jocelyn Rheaume	November 8, 2010
Derek unpacks his bags in northern Namibia where the Himba people’s lives depend upon their cattle and goats. Their wealth is measured in cattle, and their wives are bought with them. Derek quickly learns what else the cattle are good for, as he is sent out with the women to very reluctantly collect fresh dung to help build a new shelter. Mixing dung with sand and saplings, he helps his host family fashion the simple cone-shaped dwelling that will house their ever-expanding family.

== Awards ==
Year	Nominee / work	Award	Result
2011	Sheltered	Summit Awards (SCA), Category: Direction - Dave Rheaume - "Episode 4 Women's Work!"	Won Silver
