= The Cupcake Girls =

Canadian reality television series

The Cupcake Girls is a Canadian reality television series, which premiered on W Network in 2010. The series centres on Heather White and Lori Joyce, two women who are partners in a cupcake business in Vancouver, British Columbia.

The series aired for three seasons, concluding in 2012.

The series won the Gemini Award for Best Reality Series at the 25th Gemini Awards.
