= Design U =

- Genre: Design
- Created by: Tim Alp
- Directed by: Janet P. Smith
- Starring: Maureen Ross Neilson, Ernst Hupel, Melanie Martin, Baron Bryant, Christina Maureen Rice, William Mood, Blair Varden, Penny Southam, Ramón Robleto, Tyler Hamilton, Jeff Palmer, Lucie Soulard
- Theme music composer: Bartmart Audio
- Country of origin: Canada
- Original language: English
- No. of seasons: 4
- No. of episodes: 52

Production
- Executive producer: Tim Alp
- Producer: Marisa Fusaro
- Production locations: Ottawa, Ontario, Canada
- Running time: 30 Minutes
- Production company: Mountain Road Productions

Original release
- Network: HGTV
- Release: April 4, 2005

Design U is a Canadian television series which premiered on April 4, 2005, on HGTV. It ran for four seasons. Produced by Mountain Road Productions, the series gives clueless designers a crash course in interior design. After one intense day with a professional designer learning the ins and outs of design theory, the design students test their knowledge during a two-day makeover. With $3,000 and a team of renovators at their disposal, the student has to transform a single room in a house. At the end, the professional designer returns to review the results.

Hosted by Maureen Ross Neilson, the show featured designers Ernst Hupel, Melanie Martin, Ramon Robleto, and Penny Southam; lead carpenters Tyler Hamilton and Baron Bryant; seamstress Christina Maureen Rice; assistant carpenters William Mood, Jeff Palmer, Lucie Soulard and Blair Varden.

== Episodes ==
=== Season 1 (2005) ===
| No. overall | No. in series | Title | Directed by | Written by | Original release date |
|---|---|---|---|---|---|
| 1 | 1001 | "Owen's Living Room" | Unknown | Unknown | April 4, 2005 |
Roommates Owen and Chris enjoy entertaining their many friends, but all of those good times have taken a toll on their small house. Chris sends Owen to Design U to learn how to transform their living room from frat house flop to martini lounge chic. Designer Penny Southam is there to show Owen the finer points of room layout, colours, and swanky lighting.
| 2 | 1002 | "Joanne's Bedroom" | Unknown | Unknown | April 11, 2005 |
Marnie sends her good friend Joanne to Design U in the hopes that it will put a stop to Joanne’s incessant complaining about the state of her master bedroom. Will top notch designer Melanie Martin be able to help Joanne change from complainer to bragger? Joanne is certainly up for the challenge.
| 3 | 1003 | "Marg's Foyer" | Unknown | Unknown | April 18, 2005 |
Marg has only one chance to make a first impression and her best friend, Pat, knows that. So Pat enrols Marg for a one-day course at Design U so she can learn the finer points of creating a stunning foyer. Lucky for Marg, design professor Ernst Hupel opens the door to a whole new world of design.
| 4 | 1004 | "Anna's Family Room" | Unknown | Unknown | April 25, 2005 |
Eleni nominated her best friend, Anna, so she can transform her big, fat (and ugly), green family room into a space that makes you say, "Opa!" With frequent gatherings the norm in this extended Greek family, Anna needs to do something before the gang stops visiting. So, she hopes her crash course at Design U, with designer Penny Southam, will help keep the Ouzo flowing and the plates crashing… after she's finished of course!
| 5 | 1005 | "John's Basement" | Unknown | Unknown | May 2, 2005 |
John wants a room of his own and his wife, Marisa, is happy to let him have it – in the basement. But first, John has to spend some time at Design U with designer Melanie Martin so he can truly stake his claim to the one room in the house where he can let his inner hooligan run wild. Boys will be boys when it comes to basements.
| 6 | 1006 | "Karen's Living Room and Dining Room" | Unknown | Unknown | May 9, 2005 |
Karen has a beautiful old Victorian home in the heart of the city… that is a complete disastrously disorganized mess. Her best friend Suzanne can't stand to see this beautiful home in such a state, so she nominated Karen for a crash course at Design U in the hopes that Karen will add some style to her old house. Designer Ramón Robleto helps Karen realize that a room’s character and charm need to be supplemented with fabric, colour, and focus for its inner beauty to be realized.
| 7 | 1007 | "Vance's Living Room" | Unknown | Unknown | May 16, 2005 |
Lesley really wants to move back in with her sweetheart, Vance, but only if he can transform his cluttered living space into something actually liveable. Design U instructor Ernst Hupel channels his inner Cupid to help Vance win back his former roommate with lessons in multi-functional furniture, drapery, and focal points. For this bachelor, a lesson in design could turn out to be a lesson in love!
| 8 | 1008 | "Bryce's Nursery" | Unknown | Unknown | May 23, 2005 |
The stork is days away, and Bryce and Isabelle aren’t ready! Isabelle has waited almost nine months for Bryce to put together a nursery, and he still hasn’t delivered - even though Isabelle is ready to deliver! After a little time at Design U, Bryce labours day and night to complete the project. Design U prof. Penny Southam is on hand to assist with this baby.
| 9 | 1009 | "Corey's Bedroom" | Unknown | Unknown | May 30, 2005 |
Josée is hoping to shift her mechanic husband, Corey, into a different gear so she's nominated him for Design U. Now, it’s up to Design U teacher Ramón Robleto to show Corey how to build a better bedroom and take him from mechanic to designer in just one day.
| 10 | 1010 | "Geordie's Living and Dining Room" | Unknown | Unknown | June 6, 2005 |
Geordie’s mom, Norma, wants only the best for her son, so, of course, she sends him to Design U. "Geordie the teacher" becomes "Geordie the student" when his design instructor Melanie Martin teaches him how to create a harmonious living and dining area.
| 11 | 1011 | "Andrew's Living and Dining Room" | Unknown | Unknown | June 13, 2005 |
Andrew’s cluttered space has become a danger zone for his friends and family. Luckily, his pal, Randy, enrols him in Design U to keep Andrew’s living room and dining room from becoming condemned. Design U instructor Ernst Hupel shows Andrew how to use focal points and furniture to create an inviting – and safe – space.
| 12 | 1012 | "Glenn's Basement" | Unknown | Unknown | June 20, 2005 |
John is boycotting his friend Glenn’s basement until something gets done about it. Glenn enters Design U with the hope of gaining some extra space in his basement for his daughter’s toys, his computer, and his 42-inch flat screen television. Fortunately, designer Penny Southam is on hand to teach Glenn about the importance of space planning and creating zones in the room.
| 13 | 1013 | "Scott's Kitchen" | Unknown | Unknown | June 27, 2005 |
A stint at Design U may be the only way Scott can keep his mother-in-law, Judy, from complaining about the condition of his kitchen. Design U professor Ernst Hupel is there to teach Scott about kitchen layout, room flow, and materials. If he passes this test, Judy vows to keep the home-cooked meals coming. If not? Did someone mention take out?

=== Season 2 (2006) ===
| No. overall | No. in series | Title | Directed by | Written by | Original release date |
|---|---|---|---|---|---|
| 14 | 2014 | "Elsbeth’s Home Office" | Unknown | Unknown | April 3, 2006 |
Friends and business partners, Elsbeth and Bobbi, want to take their new business initiative, "Project X," to the big time. However, before they can reveal it to the general public, they need a place to get their business plan in order. Bobbi has found the perfect spot - in Elsbeth’s house. Designer Melanie Martin helps Elsbeth learn the fundamentals of good home office design and Elsbeth works overtime to get a good grade.
| 15 | 2015 | "Tony’s Patio" | Unknown | Unknown | April 10, 2006 |
Can a city girl learn to love the great outdoors? She can if she sends her sweetheart to Design U! Antonella sends her outdoorsy boyfriend, Tony, to design school so he can transform their dilapidated deck and patio into a garden oasis. Designer Ernst Hupel shows Tony the finer points of "la dolce vita al fresco."
| 16 | 2016 | "Stephen’s Living and Dining Room" | Unknown | Unknown | April 17, 2006 |
Emily wants her little brother Stephen to spruce up his living and dining room in the hope that it will give his love life a boost. Designer Melanie Martin shows Stephen the ropes when it comes to putting a very modern spin on his space. "Mr. Perfect" learns he has room for improvement!
| 17 | 2017 | "Tracee’s Bedroom" | Unknown | Unknown | April 24, 2006 |
Tracee takes her design skill to another level when her husband nominates her and their bedroom for Design U. Top-notch designer Ernst Hupel is on hand to show Tracee how to take her bedroom from blah to boutique with colour, fabric, and accessories.
| 18 | 2018 | "Marnie's Basement" | Unknown | Unknown | May 1, 2006 |
Maija sends her older sister, Marnie, to Design U for some lessons on how to create a safe and fun family room for all of their kids to use. Designer Penny Southam helps Marnie realize that interior design is not child’s play.
| 19 | 2019 | "Steve’s Living and Dining Room" | Unknown | Unknown | May 8, 2006 |
Lyne wants her husband Steve stopped before he can do any more damage to their house. Professional designer Melanie Martin puts an end to the insanity by teaching Steve how to create a clever design for their small living and dining room.
| 20 | 2020 | "Pam's Dining Room" | Unknown | Unknown | May 12, 2006 |
When they were roommates, Leah and Pam hosted dinner parties using their frat house furniture and accessories. Now that they have grown up and moved into their own homes, Leah wants Pam to move on from the frat phase and learn how to create a sophisticated dining room design. Wielding all the right ingredients is Designer Ernst Hupel, who hopes to help Pam create the perfect recipe for change.
| 21 | 2021 | "Matt's Living and Dining Room" | Unknown | Unknown | May 22, 2006 |
Jessica will not move in with her boyfriend Matt until he does something about the party palace he calls a living/dining room. Taking him from "lad pad" to "love nest" is designer Melanie Martin, who shows Matt how to make recycled furniture and wallpaper work for him.
| 22 | 2022 | "Krista's Living and Dining Room" | Unknown | Unknown | May 29, 2006 |
Krista is always letting other people help her make her design and décor decisions. Her friend, Angie, has had enough of that! She sends Krista to Design U with top designer Penny Southam so that Krista will gain some confidence to truly do-it-herself.
| 23 | 2023 | "Jay's Living Room" | Unknown | Unknown | June 5, 2006 |
Young couple Jay and Amanda have moved to a new city. Throughout their relationship, Amanda has made many sacrifices to be with her man. Now that they have bought their first house, she thinks it’s time he did something for her to make her feel comfortable in their new digs. Jay attends Design U and studies with designer Ernst Hupel. His ideas bubble over as he decides to add water to his design.
| 24 | 2024 | "Jeff's Kitchen" | Unknown | Unknown | June 12, 2006 |
Now that his girlfriend, Sally, has moved in, Jeff spends some time at Design U with designer Melanie Martin to learn to make his outdated kitchen really cook!
| 25 | 2025 | "Christine's Basement" | Unknown | Unknown | June 18, 2006 |
Enrolling her in Design U may be the only way Anne Lise can keep her little sister, Christine, from invading her space to watch TV. Design U professor Ernst takes Christine under his wing and shows her how to use the proper room layout and the right furniture to make the most of her unusually shaped basement.
| 26 | 2026 | "Shawn's Bedroom" | Unknown | Unknown | June 26, 2006 |
Angus would really like to help his partner Shawn make some changes to their bedroom. However, Shawn’s idea of change is switching his "Star Wars" pillowcase for a Technicolor one. Angus sends Shawn to Design U where Penny Southam teaches him about focal points, window treatments, and how to make a bed.

=== Season 3 (2007) ===
| No. overall | No. in series | Title | Directed by | Written by | Original release date |
|---|---|---|---|---|---|
| 27 | 3027 | "Olenka’s House Curb Appeal" | Unknown | Unknown | April 2, 2007 |
Olenka gets lessons in curb appeal when her handsome husband, Chris, sends her to Design U for a crash course in front yard design. Designer Ernst Hupel helps Olenka learn how to make a great first impression with landscaping and colour.
| 28 | 3028 | "Jodi's Bedroom" | Unknown | Unknown | April 9, 2007 |
Jodi’s love of design magazines doesn’t necessarily translate when it comes to designing her bedroom. So her fiancé Todd sends Jodi to Design U so she can learn how to create a space worthy of her very own glossy design magazine spread.
| 29 | 3029 | "John's Backyard" | Unknown | Unknown | April 16, 2007 |
John’s weed-infested backyard is driving his girlfriend Paula crazy so she decides to enrol John in Design U for some hands-on training in backyard design. After learning the importance of a focal point and strong colours, John completely transforms the small yard into a peaceful backyard retreat.
| 30 | 3030 | "Jeff's Basement" | Unknown | Unknown | April 23, 2007 |
Jeff is a radio personality with a gift for gab – not design. And his basement has, as they say, a face for radio. After being sent to Design U by his radio show partner and good buddy, Scott, it’s up to professional designer Melanie Martin to teach Jeff how to create a basement design that will be a big hit… at least with his family and friends.
| 31 | 3031 | "Lynn's Kitchen" | Unknown | Unknown | April 30, 2007 |
Does Lynn have the right recipe for a tasty new kitchen? Her friend, Marianne, enrols Lynn in Design U so she can find the right mix of ingredients to make her kitchen the flavour of the month.
| 32 | 3032 | "Anik's Guest Room" | Unknown | Unknown | May 7, 2007 |
Anik loves having friends and family stay at her house; the problem is her guest room is cluttered and drab. Her friend Kathryn sends her to Design U so she can become the hostess with the mostess and learn what happens when hospitality and interior design come together.
| 33 | 3033 | "Roberto's Office" | Unknown | Unknown | May 14, 2007 |
All work and no inspiration make a dull home office. And this is what Roberto is stuck with day in and day out. So his wife, Jennifer, sends him to Design U to get some design education and motivation. After taking care of business at school with professional designer Ernst Hupel, Roberto creates a home office that rocks!
| 34 | 3034 | "Rupa's Baby Nursery" | Unknown | Unknown | May 21, 2007 |
Rupa is an expectant mother who feels that she already has a good sense of design, but making room for baby is a challenge of a different kind. So soon-to-be daddy Denis sends his wife to Design U to help her take the first baby-steps toward a great nursery design.
| 35 | 3035 | "Zhan’s Living and Dining Room" | Unknown | Unknown | May 28, 2007 |
A new baby, three computers, and lots of old furniture spell design disaster in Zhan’s crowded living and dining room. To stop the walls from closing in on her, Zhan’s wife Phuong enrols him in Design U. It’s up to instructor Ernst Hupel to show Zhan the way to a clutter-free future.
| 36 | 3036 | "Mike's Bedroom" | Unknown | Unknown | June 4, 2007 |
Shannon has taken pity on her little brother Mike, who is blissfully unaware of how bad his bedroom design is. She sends him to Design U for a crash course with Melanie Martin. Mike learns that minimalism does not equal unfinished painting and mattresses stacked on the floor.
| 37 | 3037 | "JP's Kitchen" | Unknown | Unknown | June 11, 2007 |
Ann Marie sends her stressed-out pal JP to Design U for some lessons on kitchen design in the hope that he will get a least one room done in his unfinished home. Instructor Ernst Hupel manages to create a stir by showing JP some kitchens and materials that get his creative juices flowing.
| 38 | 3038 | "Rita's Bedroom" | Unknown | Unknown | June 18, 2007 |
Mother doesn’t always know best, as Rita finds out when her young daughters, Lindsay and Madi, send her to Design U for a much needed education on bedroom design. They want her to turn her bedroom from drab to dramatic and Rita couldn’t agree more.
| 39 | 3039 | "Colt's Living Room" | Unknown | Unknown | June 25, 2007 |
Colt realizes it’s time to grow up when he is sent to Design U to learn how to turn his frat house chic living room into something a little more mature. Designer Melanie Martin explains the finer points of modern style by showing Colt layout, fabric and colour options. But will he find room for his foosball table in his new grown-up pad?

=== Season 4 (2008) ===
| No. overall | No. in series | Title | Directed by | Written by | Original release date |
|---|---|---|---|---|---|
| 40 | 4040 | "Sandra's Bedroom" | Unknown | Unknown | March 31, 2008 |
Carter and Sandra are on-air partners on a morning-drive-time radio show - which means early to bed and early to rise for both of them. Carter is aware of how cranky his co- worker Sandra can be if she doesn’t get a good night’s rest. So he is sending her to Design U so that she will transform her boring, utilitarian bedroom into a comfortable and luxurious place where she can get a much needed, uninterrupted sleep every night.
| 41 | 4041 | "Joanne's Backyard" | Unknown | Unknown | April 7, 2008 |
Christine thinks her sister Joanne is stylish and has a great love of the outdoors. So she can’t understand why Joanne’s backyard is in such horrible shape. Christine is hoping some time at Design U with Designer Ernst Hupel will help Joanne turn her backyard into an oasis.
| 42 | 4042 | "James's Basement" | Unknown | Unknown | April 14, 2008 |
James loves his games, especially his pride and joy – the pool table. But his girlfriend, Stephanie, doesn’t think much of the space where he keeps them – their basement. James’s has left the space with unfinished walls, ugly industrial carpet, and no place to sit. Most of his buddies don’t mind but Stephanie does and she’s had enough. That’s why she is sending James to Design U and a date with designer Melanie Martin to see if he can change the space – if not himself!
| 43 | 4043 | "Julie's Front Yard" | Unknown | Unknown | April 21, 2008 |
Genevieve thinks her sister Julie, a graphic designer, has an interesting sense of design, but only when it comes to the interior of the house. The exterior is the part that really needs help since it lacks any of Julie’s personality and design savvy. Designer Ernst Hupel is the instructor who teaches Julie how to raise the curb appeal of her house so it will be as exciting and interesting on the outside as it is on the inside.
| 44 | 4044 | "Edith's Backyard" | Unknown | Unknown | April 28, 2008 |
Edith’s teenage daughter, Samuelle, is tired of the fact that they cannot use their disaster zone of a backyard. A huge pile of rubble from the destruction of the old deck makes it look like a hurricane passed through recently. Edith is more than willing to take a stab at fixing it, but she’s clueless about design when it comes to backyards. Samuelle knows that their current style, "War Zone Chic" doesn’t cut it, so its Design U and Designer Ernst Hupel to the rescue!
| 45 | 4045 | "Allison's Apartment" | Unknown | Unknown | May 5, 2008 |
Allison is a third-year college student who has energy and enthusiasm and no clue how to channel that into a cool redesign for her bachelorette pad. Her friend Carlene spends a lot of nights sleeping on the pull-out couch at Allison’s place, so she will definitely benefit from a nicely designed space. Carlene enrolls Allison in a new course curriculum at Design U with Designer Melanie Martin so she’ll learn how to maximize her small space.
| 46 | 4046 | "Tracy's Basement" | Unknown | Unknown | May 12, 2008 |
Tracey is an urban planner, who can work wonders with the layout of a city. However, when it comes to her basement, all that planning skill is nowhere to be found. The basement pulls double duty as a family room and home office. Her sister, Shelley, sends Tracey to Design U so Tracey can get her business organized and at the same time create a nice family room for everyone to enjoy.
| 47 | 4047 | "Pam's Kitchen" | Unknown | Unknown | May 19, 2008 |
Marie is a college student living with her older sister, Pam. Pam has a nice little house, but the kitchen is a disaster. Marie is a busy student and she just wants to get in and out of the kitchen without having to climb over people or furniture. Pam heads to Design U with Designer Ernst Hupel to learn the finer points of kitchen layout.
| 48 | 4048 | "Stephen's Guest Room" | Unknown | Unknown | May 26, 2008 |
Kim is taking a dramatic step! She is letting her husband Stephen redesign the guest room in their house. She thinks he is creative and clever and but isn’t too sure about his designing abilities. With a little guidance from Designer Melanie Martin at Design U, Stephen just might be able to prove to his wife that he is more than just a guy with a brain.
| 49 | 4049 | "Nella's Foyer" | Unknown | Unknown | June 2, 2008 |
Nella and Shari are neighbours, constantly visiting each other. This has given Shari numerous opportunities to examine Nella’s foyer. For a space that is supposed to make a good impression on those who enter the house, Nella’s foyer makes no impression at all. Very high ceilings, bare walls, and ugly light fixtures are the first things to greet visitors to Nella’s home. It’s up to Design U Instructor Ernst Hupel to teach Nella how to make a big impact in an often-neglected space.
| 50 | 4050 | "Jillienne's Living Room" | Unknown | Unknown | June 9, 2008 |
Nancy loves her daughter Jillienne, but hates her daughter’s living room design. While Nancy feels that the room has some nice features, it lacks any style. The leopard print motif is a relic from Jillienne’s single days and doesn’t at all represent the woman she is now: married with a four-year-old son and a second child on the way. Her mom would like nothing more than to see her daughter’s family come together at the end of each day in a relaxed and comfortable environment without the distraction and confusion of the current clutter.
| 51 | 4051 | "Bruno's Daughter's Bedroom" | Unknown | Unknown | June 16, 2008 |
Maria sends her brother, Bruno, to Design U so he will pull his house out of its 1960s time warp and into the 21st century. The newly divorced dad is starting with the cramped bedroom his twin daughters share. Designer Ernst Hupel gives him tips on putting together a space the kids can grow up with instead of grow out of.
| 52 | 4052 | "Michelle's Living Room/Dining Room" | Unknown | Unknown | June 23, 2008 |
Michelle is an event planner who often has to make quick decisions. However, Radji, her husband, finds her to be indecisive when it’s time to design their home. Even though they have been in the house for two years, Radji feels like they just moved in because they haven’t settled on one look for their open concept living room/dining room. Michelle thinks Radji is just being too "particular." Radji thinks Michelle needs Design U.

== Awards ==
| Year | Nominee / work | Award | Result |
|---|---|---|---|
| 2009 | Design U | Gemini Award, Category: Best Original Music for a Lifestyle/Practical Information or Reality Program or Series – David Burns "Bruno’s Daughter’s Bedroom" | Nominated |
| 2009 | Design U | New York Festivals, Category: Educational/Instructional TV - "Sandra's Bedroom/James' Basement/Bruno's Daughter's Bedroom" | Won Gold World Medal |
| 2008 | Design U | Summit Emerging Media Awards (EMA), Category: Media Website | Won Leader Award |
| 2007 | Design U | Summit Awards (SIA), Category: Movie/Film Music Website | Won Bronze |
| 2007 | Design U | Yorkton Film Festival, Golden Sheaf Award, Category: Lifestyle Programs | Nominated |

== International Syndication ==
| Country / Region | Name | Television Network | Dubbing / Subtitles |
|---|---|---|---|
| US | Design U | ION Media Networks | English |
