= Me, My House & I =

- Genre: Design, Renovation
- Created by: Tim Alp
- Starring: Brigitte Gall, Anthony Sayers
- Theme music composer: Bartmart Audio
- Country of origin: Canada
- Original language: English
- No. of seasons: 4
- No. of episodes: 52

Production
- Executive producers: Tim Alp and Brigitte Gall
- Production locations: Ottawa, Ontario, Canada
- Running time: 30 Minutes
- Production company: Mountain Road Productions

Original release
- Network: W Network
- Release: 2003

Me, My House & I is a Canadian television series which premiered on the W Network in 2003. It was produced by Mountain Road Productions.

== Awards ==
Year	Nominee / work	Award	Result
2006	Me, My House & I	Summit Awards (SIA), Category: Movie/Film Music Website	Won Bronze
2004	Me, My House & I	Gemini Award, Category: Best Practical Information Series	Nominated
