= W Network =

Canadian women's entertainment specialty channel

- Country: Canada
- Broadcast area: Nationwide
- Headquarters: Toronto, Ontario

Programming
- Picture format: 1080i HDTV (downscaled to letterboxed 480i for the SDTV feed)
- Timeshift service: W Network East; W Network West

Ownership
- Owner: Corus Entertainment
- Sister channels: Slice; Showcase; Adult Swim

History
- Launched: January 1, 1995; 31 years ago
- Former names: Women's Television Network (1995–2002)

Links
- Website: wnetwork.com

Availability

Streaming media
- Amazon Prime Video Channels: StackTV
- RiverTV: Channel 11 (HD)

W Network (often shortened to W) is a Canadian English language discretionary specialty channel owned by Corus Entertainment. The channel primarily broadcasts general entertainment programming oriented towards a female audience.

W Network was established in 1995 as the Women's Television Network (WTN), which had a focus on women's lifestyle programming. The channel was eventually acquired by Corus in 2001 and relaunched under its current branding in 2002. As part of the relaunch, W's programming shifted to a mix of both entertainment and lifestyle programming. By 2017, W had moved its lifestyle programming to its sister networks, shifting to a general entertainment format targeting women. In 2018, the channel became part of output deals with Hallmark Media, and later Comcast's Peacock and Sky Studios in 2020 (an agreement shared with sister network Showcase).

The channel is available in two time shifted feeds, East (operating from the Eastern Time Zone) and West (operating from the Pacific Time Zone).

== History ==
=== As Women's Television Network ===
Women's Television Network logo; 1995-2002

In June 1994, Linda Rankin, on behalf of a corporation to be incorporated, (later incorporated as Lifestyle Television (1994) Limited, principally owned by Moffat Communications) was granted a television broadcasting licence by the Canadian Radio-television and Telecommunications Commission (CRTC) to operate a channel called Lifestyle Television, described as offering "information and entertainment programming of particular interest to women."

The channel subsequently launched on January 1, 1995, as the Women's Television Network (WTN). Like Moffat's other cable television operations, WTN was headquartered in Winnipeg, Manitoba. Linda Rankin served as the president of the network from its launch.

Programming on the network was originally largely focused on lifestyle programming that many had suggested was "feminist" in nature. Such programming included female takes on traditionally male-dominated activities such as fishing and mechanics, with Natural Angler and Car Care, respectively, while other programs, such as Go Girl!, took a comedic approach at parodying typical female-targeted talk shows that discussed subjects such as beauty and fashion. Other programs included films, current affairs, and occasionally athletic-themed.

The channel suffered from low ratings in the start. Of the slew of new channels launched on January 1, 1995, WTN was initially the lowest-rated channel on average. Linda Rankin later resigned in August 1995 citing "differences in management philosophy".

=== As W Network ===
In December 2000, Shaw Communications announced it intended to purchase Moffat. The deal was later closed in early 2001. Shaw announced in March 2001 that it would sell WTN to Corus Entertainment, a company that it spun off in 1999, for CA$205 million (Shaw had primarily acquired Moffat for its cable television systems). Once Corus took ownership of the channel, it moved operations from Winnipeg to Toronto in mid-January 2002, laying off 50 employees in the process. Corus subsequently relaunched the network as W on April 15, 2002, with a more entertainment-oriented mix of recent dramas and movies. On the same date, Corus launched the west coast feed.

In 2009, Corus Entertainment acquired SexTV: The Channel from CTVglobemedia, and relaunched the channel as W Movies — a spin-off of W Network focusing on films aimed towards women, on March 1, 2010. On December 12, 2016, W Movies was closed and replaced by a relaunched, Canadian version of the Cooking Channel.

On August 2, 2011, the channel launched its HD feed, a simulcast of W Network's standard-definition Eastern-time feed. The HD feed was added to Bell Satellite TV satellite and Bell Fibe TV channel lineups on March 23, 2012. It was also available on Eastlink, Optik TV, Shaw Direct, SaskTel, Rogers Cable, Cogeco, and Access Communications. On October 1, 2013, an HD feed for the Western-timed channel was launched on Shaw Cable, then on Shaw Direct on September 18, 2019.

==== 2017–present ====
By 2017, W Network had begun to place a larger emphasis on scripted series targeting a female audience to compliment sister channel Showcase, including new acquisitions such as Nashville and Valor. The majority of its lifestyle programming, including the Property Brothers franchise, was moved to HGTV (now Home Network), as well as Corus' other women and lifestyle networks.

On October 25, 2018, Corus announced an output deal with Crown Media Holdings, giving W Network exclusive Canadian rights to original movies and series produced for Hallmark Channel and Hallmark Movies & Mysteries. W Network carries branded blocks of Hallmark Channel content, including seasonal programming events such as Countdown to Christmas; many of Hallmark's productions are filmed in Canada.

In June 2020, Corus reached output agreements with NBCUniversal Global Distribution for Canadian rights to Peacock original series, shared primarily between W and sister network Showcase. The following month, Corus also reached an agreement with sister company Sky Studios. Devils served as one of the first series to air on W as part of the Sky agreement. As part of the Peacock agreement, the long-running soap opera Days of our Lives (which had long-been carried by sister broadcast network Global in simulcast with NBC) moved to W Network in September 2022.

== Programming ==
W Network primarily broadcasts films and television series targeting a female audience, including dramas, sitcoms, and romantic comedies. The network has an output agreement with Hallmark Media that gives it the exclusive Canadian rights to Hallmark Channel, Hallmark Mystery, and Hallmark+ original productions, including seasonal programming events such as Countdown to Christmas. It also participates in Corus Entertainment's agreements with NBCUniversal for Peacock and Sky Studios original programming.

W previously produced and aired unscripted reality shows and lifestyle programming; it was well known for originating the Love It or List It and Property Brothers franchises seen on HGTV in the U.S. These programs moved to Corus' other lifestyle networks (particularly HGTV Canada and Slice) following W's shift to scripted programming.

=== List of programming ===
==== Original series ====
- All for Nothing?
- Anna & Kristina's Grocery Bag
- The Atwood Stories
- The Bachelorette Canada
- Brother vs. Brother
- Cameron's House Rules
- Candice Tells All
- Cash and Cari
- Colour Confidential
- Come Dine with Me Canada
- The Cupcake Girls
- Deal with It
- Divine Design
- Game of Homes
- Grin and Build It
- Hockey Wives
- Inside the Box with Ty Pennington
- Love It or List It
- Love It or List It Vancouver
- Masters of Flip
- Maxed Out
- Me, My House & I
- My House Your Money
- Property Brothers
- Property Brothers: Buying + Selling
- The Real Estate Adventures of Sandy & Maryse
- The Restaurant Adventures of Caroline & Dave
- The Shields Stories
- Save Us from Our House
- Say Yes to the Dress Canada
- Shannon and Sophie
- The Smart Woman Survival Guide
- Take This House and Sell It
- Tessa and Scott
- Undercover Boss Canada
- Who Lives Here?

==== Acquired programming ====
- Based on a True Story
- The Best Man: The Final Chapters
- Chesapeake Shores
- Days of Our Lives
- Days of Our Lives: Beyond Salem
- Days of Our Lives: A Very Salem Christmas
- Dreamland
- The Equalizer
- Five Bedrooms
- Frasier
- Ghosts
- The Girl from Plainville
- Girls5eva
- The Good Doctor
- The Good Fight
- Good Witch
- I Am...
- Katy Keene
- Law & Order: Special Victims Unit
- A Million Little Things
- Mom
- Mystery 101
- Nancy Drew
- NCIS: Los Angeles
- The Neighborhood
- One of Us Is Lying
- Outlander
- Pitch Perfect: Bumper in Berlin
- Sex with Sue
- So Help Me Todd
- Superstore
- This Way Up
- Vampire Academy
- Walker: Independence
- The Way Home
- We Are Lady Parts
- When Calls the Heart
- Why Women Kill
- Will & Grace
