= Oprah Winfrey Network (Canada) =

Defunct Canadian TV channel

OWN Canada
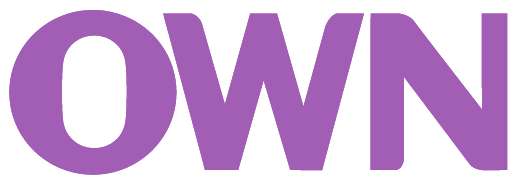
- Country: Canada
- Broadcast area: Nationwide
- Headquarters: Toronto, Ontario

Programming
- Language: English
- Picture format: 1080i HDTV (downscaled to letterboxed 480i for the SDTV feed)

Ownership
- Owner: Corus Entertainment (branding licensed from Warner Bros. Discovery)
- Sister channels: Cooking Channel; DTour; Food Network Canada; HGTV Canada; Magnolia Network Canada; Slice

History
- Launched: September 1, 1999; 27 years ago
- Closed: September 1, 2024; 2 years ago
- Former names: Canadian Learning Television (1999–2008); Viva (2008–2011)

Links
- Website: owntv.ca

Oprah Winfrey Network, more commonly shortened to OWN, was a Canadian English language discretionary specialty channel owned by Corus Entertainment, with brand licensing and its American programming obtained from Warner Bros. Discovery (owners of OWN) that operated from September 1, 1999, to September 30, 2024.

Established as Canadian Learning Television (CLT) by Learning and Skills Television of Alberta, Ltd., (Note: then held by CHUM Limited) the channel began as a spinoff of Access, targeting a family and male demographic with a focus on educational and infomercial programming. Its lineup later expanded to incorporate lifestyle, entertainment and reality programming aimed at a female audience.

Under Corus ownership and its final branding as Oprah Winfrey Network, the channel adopted its final format and largely retired its original format. Corus eventually lost the rights to the OWN brand and its American programming at the end of summer 2024, resulting in the complete shutdown of OWN effective September 1, 2024. Although Rogers Sports & Media took over the Canadian rights to the OWN programming effective January 1, 2025, it did not plan to relaunch as a new channel. Instead, it is primarily distributing it through its Citytv+ streaming service.

== History ==
=== As Canadian Learning Television ===
In September 1996, Learning and Skills Television of Alberta Ltd. (LSTA) (controlled by CHUM Limited through a 60% interest in the company) was granted a television broadcasting licence by the Canadian Radio-television and Telecommunications Commission (CRTC) called Canadian Learning Television. The channel was licensed to provide "formal and informal educational programs on a wide range of topics."

Canadian Learning Television logo used from 1999 to 2003.

The channel launched on September 1, 1999, as Canadian Learning Television, with a mix of educational and informational television programs. CHUM would later gain 100% ownership of the channel when it completed its purchase of the remaining interest in LSTA on February 15, 2005. The company would later be renamed Access Media Group.

In 2003, Canadian Learning Television adopted a new logo and on-air presentation. With this change, the channel began using the brand "CLT" in most media instead of using its full name, although Canadian Learning Television remained the official name of the channel.

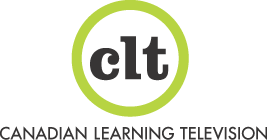
Logo as CLT (2003–2008), often the wording below the circle was omitted

In July 2006, Bell Globemedia (later CTVglobemedia) announced that it would purchase CHUM for an estimated CAD$1.7 billion, included in the sale was CLT. As CTVglobemedia planned to retain CTV and Citytv, CLT was among the channels to be acquired by Rogers Communications along with CHUM's A-Channel stations, CKX-TV in Brandon, Access and SexTV: The Channel) as announced on April 9, 2007, pending CRTC approval (and approval of CTVglobemedia's purchase).

However, on June 8, 2007, the CRTC approved the sale of CHUM on a condition that CTV must sell the Citytv stations instead, the Rogers deal was rendered void. As such, CTVglobemedia retained CLT along with the A-Channel stations, CKX-TV, and all of CHUM's specialty channels, and sold the Citytv stations to Rogers Media. The transaction was finalized on June 22, 2007.

In less than a year after taking ownership of Canadian Learning Television, on March 7, 2008, CTVglobemedia announced it would sell the channel to Corus Entertainment for approximately $73 million CAD. The deal was approved by the CRTC on August 22, 2008. The transaction was then finalized on September 1, 2008.

=== Refocusing as a lifestyle channel ===
In October 2008, Corus announced it would relaunch CLT as Viva, a female-focused entertainment and lifestyle channel targeting the baby boomer demographic. The rebrand took effect on November 3, 2008. On August 31, 2009, Viva switched to an ad-supported format.

Logo used as Viva & Viva HD

On September 29, 2010, Corus announced it had finalized an agreement to launch a Canadian version of the Oprah Winfrey Network in Canada in 2011. Although Corus had said the new channel would involve rebranding an existing channel owned by the company, it had not announced which channel it would be, nor did Corus announce a specific launch date. However, in November 2010, Corus announced that Viva would be rebranded as OWN on March 1, 2011, two months after the Discovery Health channel in the United States was relaunched as the Oprah Winfrey Network on January 1. During that time, select OWN programming was broadcast on Viva and on another Corus-owned female-targeted channel, W Network. An HD feed was also launched.

==== CRTC licence controversy ====
In December 2012, the Canadian Radio-television and Telecommunications Commission held a hearing investigating OWN's non-compliance with its mandate to air formal education programming – a holdover of its establishment as Canadian Learning Television. Although Corus stated that it was planning changes to the network's programming to comply with the requirements (including the introduction of four new weekly educational programs to its lineup), the CRTC warned that it could revoke the channel's license or require Corus to apply for a new category B license to operate the channel under.

OWN TV logo 2011-2015

On March 15, 2013, the CRTC further issued a "mandatory order", the last step before license revocation. The order asked for the reduction of programming about "life enhancement," and for more programming addressing the building of job and credit-building skills, along with violations of programming, including airing films, which the network is not allowed to do, and that what did air had only a short professor introduction without any tie-in to the film. The CRTC increased monitoring requirements for the network and asked Corus for a new programming plan to be introduced no later than April 5.

In October 2015, the requirement to air adult education programming, as well as the increased monitoring requirements, were both dropped by the CRTC at the request of Corus, when the CRTC repealed the genre protection rules as part of reforms to policies regarding specialty television services.

The network was united with other Discovery and Scripps-licensed networks on April 1, 2016, after Corus completed its acquisition of rival broadcaster Shaw Media.

=== Network closure ===
On June 7, 2024, Corus announced it had been informed by Warner Bros. Discovery (WBD) that the latter would be ending its trademark licensing and program output agreements for some WBD-branded channels after December 31, 2024. On June 10, 2024, Rogers Sports & Media announced it had reached an agreement with WBD for Canadian rights to its lifestyle brands beginning in January 2025. Corus later acknowledged that OWN was one of the affected brands.

Corus said in its announcement that it would continue operating the affected channels with their existing Canadian programming with alternate imported content. On June 25, 2024, a notice posted to the service updates page of Rogers Cable stated that "starting September 1, 2024, OWN TV Canada will no longer be aired by the broadcaster." Corus made no further mentions of any changes to their networks until the announcement of their third quarter earnings on July 15, confirming the affected networks were under review and stated that while some of the affected channels would be considered for closure, sister channels Food Network and HGTV are expected to be respectively rebranded as Flavour Network and Home Network as Corus retains domestic rights to programming originally produced for those channels by it and its forerunners.

On August 13, 2024, the channel's website was reduced to a one-page statement confirming its September 1 closure (which occurred as planned with no ceremony, and no acknowledgment outside on-screen provider notices) after other providers announced as such. The website was eventually closed on August 30, redirecting to the official Oprah Winfrey website. The network's license was surrendered to the CRTC on October 8, 2024. OWN's content under Rogers will be a part of its Citytv+ streaming service at the start of 2025, rather than being transferred to any Rogers-owned linear channels.

== Programming ==
When the channel was launched as CLT, it aired a mix of formal and informal educational and informational programming in the style of newsmagazines, talk shows, documentaries, and sitcoms aimed at family audiences, among others. Over time, the channel introduced more entertainment-based programs such as films and television dramas. The channel maintained a similar scheduling format as Access (the current-day CTV 2 Alberta), which aired a mix of entertainment and educational programming until 2017, both of which were under the same ownership of CHUM and later CTVglobemedia before CLT was sold to Corus Entertainment.

As licensed for various educational channels, OWN, historically, did not broadcast traditional commercials during programs, opting instead to air promos and PSAs between programs. The channel aired commercials from 2009 to 2024 after the channel rebranding to Viva.

As Viva, the channel aired a mix of entertainment and loosely based educational programming to satisfy its CRTC licence requirements, and to that end, many programs continued to be tied to some sort of ongoing course at a Canadian post-secondary institution as it did under CLT. However, with the changeover to Viva, most of the programs had begun with a short introduction from an instructor at the applicable institution.

Under the OWN moniker, the channel would continue to target women with programming, ranging from lifestyle and information to entertainment programming. By 2015, its educational and informational programming had left the schedule, with comedy following in 2020: the channel's final programming consisted of various lifestyle programming.
