= Masters of Flip =

- Presented by: Dave Wilson; Kortney Wilson
- Country of origin: Canada

Production
- Running time: 60 minutes
- Production company: Rhino Content

Original release
- Network: W, HGTV
- Release: May 12, 2015 – May 15, 2019

Masters of Flip is a Canadian home renovation reality television series, which premiered in 2015 on W. The series centres on Dave and Kortney Wilson, a then-married Canadian couple who moved to Nashville, Tennessee, to pursue careers in country music and then turned to renovating and flipping houses after their musical careers faltered.

The couple also previously appeared in the CMT Canada reality shows Meet the Wilsons and Kortney & Dave: By Request, and have served as guest judges on W's Game of Homes.

In mid-2018, Masters of Flip series was running on HGTV in North America and also in numerous other countries.

At the 4th Canadian Screen Awards in 2016 and the 5th Canadian Screen Awards in 2017 and the 6th Canadian Screen Awards in 2018 the series garnered nominations for Best Lifestyle Program or Series, Best Editing in a reality or competition program or series, Best Photography in a lifestyle or reality program or series and Best Directing for Lifestyle or information series.

The series ended after its fourth season, with the Wilsons moving on to produce and host the new series Making it Home with Kortney and Dave.
