= The Real Estate Adventures of Sandy & Maryse =

- Genre: Reality, Docudrama
- Created by: Tim Alp
- Directed by: Sue Stranks
- Starring: Sandy Niemczak, Maryse Derouin
- Theme music composer: Bartmart Audio
- Country of origin: Canada
- Original language: English
- No. of seasons: 1
- No. of episodes: 10

Production
- Executive producer: Tim Alp
- Producers: Tim Alp, Marisa Fusaro
- Production locations: Ottawa, Ontario, Canada
- Running time: 30 Minutes
- Production company: Mountain Road Productions

Original release
- Network: W Network
- Release: September 8, 2008

The Real Estate Adventures of Sandy & Maryse is a Canadian television series which premiered on September 8, 2008, on the W Network. Produced by Mountain Road Productions the series is the story of two women, motivated by a desire for change and a love of home renovation, take on the challenge of flipping a house for fun and profit.

== Awards ==
Year	Nominee / work	Award	Result
2009	The Real Estate Adventures of Sandy & Maryse	New York Festivals, Category: International TV Broadcasting	Won Finalist Award
