= Home Network =

Canadian specialty TV channel

- Country: Canada
- Broadcast area: Nationwide
- Headquarters: Toronto, Ontario

Programming
- Language: English
- Picture format: 1080i (HDTV); 480i (SDTV)

Ownership
- Owner: Corus Entertainment
- Parent: Home Network, Inc.
- Sister channels: Flavour Network; W Network

History
- Launched: October 17, 1997; 28 years ago
- Former names: HGTV Canada (1997–2024)

Links
- Website: Home Network

Availability

Streaming media
- StackTV: Internet Protocol television

Home Network is a Canadian English-language discretionary cable and satellite specialty channel owned by Home Network, Inc., a subsidiary of Corus Entertainment. Home Network broadcasts programs relating to real estate, home and garden design, and renovations.

This channel was launched as HGTV Canada on October 17, 1997 under the joint ownership of Atlantis Communications and E. W. Scripps Company. Atlantis merged with Alliance Communications to form Alliance Atlantis Communications in 1998 and the stake of HGTV was then acquired. After several ownership changes throughout the years while maintaining the same format, the channel has been owned by Corus since 2016.

As HGTV, the network's programming drew partially from the U.S. version of the channel, but it also carried original Canadian-produced series, some of which have in turn also been picked up for broadcast by the U.S. network or others internationally, as well as a smaller selection of home renovation programming acquired from other producers in the United States or the United Kingdom.

In June 2024, Rogers Sports & Media announced that it had acquired Canadian rights to Warner Bros. Discovery factual and lifestyle television brands beginning in 2025, including HGTV. Rogers announced its intent to relaunch HGTV as a new discretionary specialty channel on January 1, 2025. Corus announced that it would continue to operate its existing HGTV channel under a new brand, replacing HGTV U.S. programming with other acquisitions to accompany its existing Canadian productions. The new brand was later announced as Home Network, which launched on December 30, 2024.

== History ==
=== As HGTV Canada ===
In September 1996, Atlantis Communications subsidiary Your Channel Television Inc., owner of Life Network, and minority partner E. W. Scripps Company were granted a television broadcasting licence by the Canadian Radio-television and Telecommunications Commission (CRTC) for a channel called HGTV-TV Canada. The decision described the channel as focused on "programming that presents practical, hands-on advice and instruction about homes and gardens", and would "revolve around five key themes: building and remodelling, decorating and interior design, gardening and landscaping, crafts and hobbies and special interests."

HGTV Canada logo used from 1997 to 2012

The channel was launched as HGTV on October 17, 1997. Channels also launched that day were History Television, Teletoon, and Prime. In June 1998, Atlantis Communications announced that it planned to merge with Alliance Communications, another fellow television and film producer and broadcaster, owners of History Television and Showcase at the time, to form a new company called Alliance Atlantis Communications. The CRTC approved the merger in May 1999.

On January 18, 2008, a joint venture between Canwest and Goldman Sachs Alternatives known as CW Media acquired control of HGTV through its purchase of Alliance Atlantis' broadcasting assets, which were placed in a trust in August 2007.

On October 27, 2010, the channel's ownership changed again as Shaw Communications gained control of HGTV as a result of its acquisition of Canwest and Goldman Sachs' interest in CW Media.

A high definition feed launched on January 31, 2011, which was eventually made available through all major television providers.

HGTV Canada logo used from 2012 to 2015

On April 1, 2016, Shaw Media was sold to Corus Entertainment, making HGTV Canada a sibling to additional channels such as W Network.

=== As Home Network ===
HGTV Canada logo used from 2015 to 2024

On June 7, 2024, Corus announced it had been informed by Warner Bros. Discovery (WBD) that the latter would be ending its trademark licensing and program output agreements for some WBD-branded channels at the end of 2024. Three days later, Rogers Sports & Media announced it had reached an agreement with WBD for the Canadian rights to its lifestyle brands including HGTV beginning in January 2025. Rogers subsequently announced it intends to launch its own HGTV linear channel on January 1, 2025.

Corus said in its June announcement that it intended to continue operating many of the affected channels under new brands with their existing Canadian programming along with "alternate foreign content supply". In September, Corus announced that the current HGTV channel would relaunch as "Home Network" on December 30, 2024; its new schedule will feature new and renewed series featuring Canadian personalities such as Bryan Baeumler and Scott McGillivray (who have direct relationships with Corus despite also having been featured on the American HGTV channel), as well as new international acquisitions. Some repeats of HGTV U.S. programming will continue airing into 2025.

At some point after the rebranding, Warner Bros. Discovery divested its stake in the subsidiary that holds Home Network's license to Corus Media Holdings, making it sole owner.

== Programming ==
As Home Network, the service continues to hold the rights to nearly all programming that it produced prior to the conclusion of the HGTV brand licensing; it has, however, lost Baeumler's programming after he signed a new production deal with the Rogers iteration of HGTV in fall 2025, while McGillivray also signed a new production deal with Rogers in June 2026.

New Canadian programs airing on the service since the rebranding have included Beer Budget Reno, Rentovation and Life Is Messy, as well as new seasons of Canadian series that premiered before the branding shift.

The channel has shifted to air American programming from other sources besides HGTV, including the 2024 revival of Extreme Makeover: Home Edition and design programming from Tastemade, A&E's Home.Made.Nation programming block and The Roku Channel, as well as British and Australian home design and real estate programming such as A Place in the Sun, Love It or List It UK, George Clarke's Amazing Spaces, Selling Houses Australia and The Block.
