= Summit Awards =

Summit International Awards
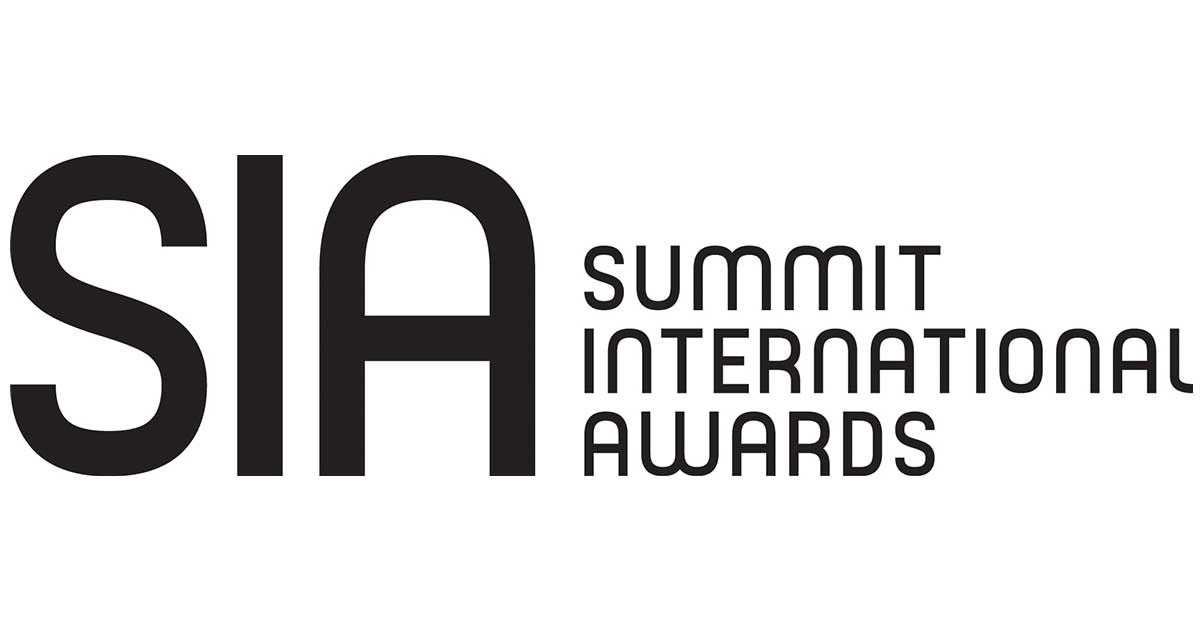
- Awarded for: Excellence in advertising, marketing, and communication
- Country: United States
- First award: 1994
- Final award: 2024
- Website: www.summitawards.com

Summit Awards is a United States-based organization in the communications and marketing industry. It bestows awards for excellence in design, creativity and effectiveness of advertising and marketing communication. Established in 1993, it offers three annual award competitions.

== Categories ==
Three times a year the Summit International Awards assembles an international panel of judges from multiple creative disciplines to evaluate submissions in three main categories:

1. Summit Creative Award (Summit SCA). Recognizes creative and innovative work in advertising and marketing.
2. Summit Marketing Effectiveness Award (Summit MEA). Awards campaigns that demonstrate significant impact and marketing effectiveness.
3. Summit Emerging Media Awards (Summit EMA). Celebrates pioneering work in emerging media platforms.

Entrants are graded on creativity, originality, effectiveness and excellence. From the entrants, a first round of judges determine the finalists; senior judges then grade each finalist to determine if they are considered an award winner. An award winner can earn a Bronze, Silver or Gold Summit Award. Only one winner in each category can be selected for a Summit Best of Show Award.

The award is open to professional creative arts agencies, studios and designers from all countries with annual capitalized billings of under $30 million.
