= Global Reporting Centre =

Canadian news organization

- Founded: 2016
- Purpose: Investigative journalism
- Location: Vancouver, British Columbia
- Method: Non-profit
- Key people: Peter W. Klein, Founder and Chair of the Board; Andrea Crossan, Executive Director; Britney Dennison, Executive Editor
- Employees: <10
- Website: www.globalreportingcentre.org

The Global Reporting Centre (GRC) is an independent news organization focused on innovating global journalism, based out of the University of British Columbia in Vancouver, British Columbia, Canada. Its model works by pairing scholars, leading journalists and news organizations to cover neglected stories around the world.

Founded by Peter W. Klein, it grew from the International Reporting Program (now called the Global Reporting Program) based at the University of British Columbia Graduate School of Journalism, Writing, and Media.

== Projects ==
In 2018, the Global Reporting Centre received a $2.5 million grant from the Social Sciences and Humanities Research Council of Canada for ‘Hidden Costs of Global Supply Chains,’ a multi-year project bringing together researchers, journalists, students, and media broadcasters to investigate “corruption, labour abuses and environmental impact hidden within global supply chains.” The organization has also partnered with the Center for Investigative Reporting to report on a digital dumping ground in China. In 2016, the Global Reporting Centre received funding from the Aga Khan Foundation to profile efforts to wipe out Rh Disease and explore it as a public health issue. The resulting story by Jennifer Yang was published in the Toronto Star.

During the early stages of the COVID-19 pandemic, the Global Reporting Centre partnered with the Associated Press and the PBS series FRONTLINE to investigate the medical supply crisis as part of its work on global supply chains. That investigation led to a documentary, a series of articles, and an interactive explainer. The Pulitzer Center also created educational resources based on the documentary. From 2021 to 2023, the Global Reporting Centre continued its reporting on supply chains, partnering with NBC News to produce a series about plastic production in Appalachia. Shell agreed to pay $10 million for exceeding emissions limits during the launch of its Petrochemicals Complex in Beaver County, PA, weeks after NBC News and The Global Reporting Centre questioned Shell and the Pennsylvania Department of Environmental Protection as part of its investigation.

The Global Reporting Centre has also supported cross-sector collaboration between academics and journalists by providing grants and other support under the ‘Hidden Costs of Global Supply Chains’ project, including funding projects like The Carbon Cage, a collaboration between journalist Duy Linh Tu and Saint Mary’s University associate professor Kate Ervine, published by Scientific American. The Carbon Cage won the 2023 Telly Award in Virtual Art Direction. The Global Reporting Centre also funded a partnership between Toronto Star reporter Robert Cribb and Genevieve LeBaron, former University of Sheffield professor and current professor and director of the School of Public Policy at Simon Fraser University. That collaboration led to a 10-month investigation into how COVID-19 was impacting garment workers in South Asian and African countries; it garnered global coverage from the BBC, Reuters, and The New York Times.
