= International Reporting Program =

The International Reporting Program (IRP) is a program at the University of British Columbia Graduate School of Journalism, which gives students the opportunity to research and report under-covered stories from around the world and develop innovative ways of covering these issues. Student projects are featured on major news outlets including The New York Times, PBS, Al Jazeera, CBS, Global, Vice News and The Globe and Mail. Past project have won some of the top media awards, including the Emmy for Best Investigation, two Sigma Delta Chi Awards from the Society of Professional Journalists, four Edward R. Murrow Awards from the Radio Television Digital News Association, two Webby honors, the Digital Publishing Award, an American Health Care Journalism Award, numerous Canadian Online Publishing Awards and several "Online News Association" nominations.

Past projects have taken students to China, India, Indonesia, Ghana, Togo, Benin, Cameroon, Chile, Brazil, Thailand, Ukraine, Russia and Jordan.

The program was created by professor Peter Klein with the help of a $1 million donation from Alison Lawton and the Mindset Social Innovation Foundation.

== Awards ==
Project	Project Year	Award/Nomination
China's Generation Green	2014	Edward R. Murrow National Award for Best Online Video News Series
China's Generation Green	2014	Society of Professional Journalists – Sigma Delta Chi Award for Non-Deadline Online Reporting
China's Generation Green	2014	Canadian Association of Journalists Award for Online Media
China's Generation Green	2014	Edward R. Murrow Regional Award (International Region) Small Online News Organization Video Series
China's Generation Green	2014	Canadian Online Publishing Award – Best Interactive Story
CUT	2013	Edward R. Murrow Regional Award (International Region) Small Online News Organization Overall Excellence
CUT	2013	Webby Award - Green Category
CUT	2013	Canadian Online Publishing Award - Best Multimedia Feature
CUT	2013	Canadian Online Publishing Award - Best Interactive Story
The Pain Project	2011	Association of Health Care Journalists Award
The Pain Project	2011	Canadian Online Publishing Award - Best Multimedia Feature Gold
The Pain Project	2011	Canadian Online Publishing Award - Best Online-Only Publication Silver
Cheap Shrimp: Hidden Costs	2010	Canadian Online Publishing Award - Nomination
Cheap Shrimp: Hidden Costs	2010	Online Journalism Award - Nomination Online Video Journalism, Small Site
Ghana: Digital Dumping Ground	2009	Emmy Award - Outstanding Investigative Journalism
Ghana: Digital Dumping Ground	2009	Emmy Award - Nomination for Outstanding Research
Ghana: Digital Dumping Ground	2009	Livingston Award for Young Journalists - Nomination
