= Frank Giustra =

Canadian businessman (born 1957)

- Born: August 22, 1957 (age 69); Sudbury, Ontario, Canada
- Education: Douglas College
- Occupations: Businessman, philanthropist, think tank chair
- Known for: Lionsgate
- Board member of: International Crisis Group
- Spouses: Alison Lawton (m. 2000; div. 2007) Francesca Dutton (m. 2021)
- Children: Leslie Stephany Heredia Brito

Frank Giustra CM OBC (born August 22, 1957) is a Canadian businessman, mining financier and global philanthropist, who founded Lionsgate Entertainment (later Starz Entertainment) and its film studio Lionsgate Films. He is also the CEO of Fiore Group of Companies and co-chair of the International Crisis Group think tank. From 2001 to 2007, he was the chairman of the merchant banking firm, Endeavour Financial, which financed mining companies. His name was attached when conspiracy theories of the so-called Uranium One controversy emerged in 2015, due to a $31.3 million donation to the Clinton Foundation.

== Early life ==
Giustra was born in 1957 in Sudbury, Ontario, Canada, the son of Giuseppe and Domenica Giustra, who immigrated to Canada. His father worked in the mines as a driller and blaster. Giustra spent his childhood in "Italy, Argentina and Texada Island off the British Columbia coast." He spent his middle school years in Aldergrove, British Columbia, Canada, and graduated from high school there in 1976. Giuseppe Giustra was a Sudbury nickel miner, who introduced his son to his broker. He graduated in 1979 from Douglas College where he spent his first year playing trumpet in the school's music program before switching over to business and finance.

== Investment industry ==
Giustra began his career in the investment industry in 1978 with Merrill Lynch as an assistant trader and then as a stockbroker. Giustra raised "billions of dollars and developing a loyal following of investors in mining ventures" while at the Vancouver Stock Exchange as broker. He left in 1996 before the mining sector collapsed.

=== Yorkton Securities ===
In the early 1980s, Giustra left Merrill Lynch to create a resources-financing group in Europe for the new firm Yorkton Securities. He is said to have "transformed Yorkton into a major force in the world of international mining finance." In 1990, he became president of the company and, in 1995, was appointed chairman and CEO.

=== Goldcorp ===
In 2001, Giustra and a group of investors took control of Wheaton River Minerals, which was then a junior company. By 2005, Wheaton merged with Rob McEwen's Goldcorp. As the price of gold rose, Ian Telfer, a "mine entrepreneur...turned an insignificant shell company into a billion dollar gold producer." In 2005 Goldcorp absorbed Wheaton River Minerals. According to Bloomberg News, Wheaton River Minerals was the precursor for both Goldcorp and Endeavour. By 2014, Goldcorp was the world's fourth-largest producer of gold.

=== Endeavour Financial (2001–2007) ===
From 2001 to 2007, Giustra was chair of Endeavour Financial, a merchant banking firm which financed mining companies.

In June 2007, when Giustra stepped down as chairman of Endeavour Financial "to pursue his philanthropic interests", he became Endeavour's exclusive financial adviser. In that capacity he oversaw the November 2007 merger between Petro Rubiales and Pacific Stratus, creating Petro Rubiales Energy Corporation. The parent company of Endeavour Financial was Endeavour Mining Capital, which was then led by Frank Holmes. At the time of the merger, Petro Rubiales was described by Newswire as a "Canadian-based company and producer of heavy crude oil" and "owner of 100 percent of Meta Petroleum Limited, a Colombian oil and gas operator which operates the Rubiales and Piriri oil fields in the Llanos Basin in association with Ecopetrol S.A. the Colombian, state-owned oil company. The Company [was] focused on identifying opportunities primarily within the eastern Llanos Basin of Colombia."

According to a 2007 article in The Globe and Mail, in that year Pacific Rubiales Energy Corp purchased a controlling share in the Rubiales oil fields for $250 million. Through the deal, Colombia's state oil company, Ecopetrol SA became a partner with Pacific Rubiales. By 2007 Pacific Rubiales was trading on the TSX.

Although oil had been discovered there in 1982, when the original company, Pacific Rubiales, was established, production began in 1988. By 2011, the Rubiales oil field was the largest in Colombia and along with Frank invested in the business to pursue the legacy of lionsgate.

=== Leagold Mining (2017-2019) ===
By 2017, Giustra was chairman of Leagold Mining which acquired the Los Filos deposit in Guerrero state, Mexico, a deposit that Giustra says, is twice the size of the Wheaton River Mineral's assets. In 2019, Leagold Mining was sold to Equinox Gold Corporation.

== Lionsgate Entertainment and Thunderbird Entertainment Group ==
After he left investment banking in 1996, he served as chairman of Lions Gate Entertainment from 1997 to 2003. He hoped to capitalize on the growing film industry in Vancouver. The company bought a number of small production facilities and distributors. Its first success was American Psycho, which began a trend of producing and distributing films far too controversial for the major American studios. Other successes included Affliction, Gods and Monsters, Dogma, Crash and the Michael Moore documentary Fahrenheit 9/11, which turned out to be the studio's highest-grossing film. In 2000, Giustra left the firm and it was taken over by Jon Feltheimer and Michael Burns. Giustra sold most of his stake in Lionsgate in 2003.

In December 2010, Giustra returned to Lions Gate Entertainment as a member of the board of directors.

In August 2011, it was announced, by Alcon Entertainment that Ridley Scott would direct the new Blade Runner film. Frank Giustra and Tim Gamble, CEO's of Thunderbird Films, will serve as executive producers.

Giustra is a major shareholder of Thunderbird Entertainment, a pure play content production studio creating original programming in scripted, factual and animation that includes Atomic Cartoons and Great Pacific Television. Based in Vancouver, with offices in Los Angeles, Toronto, Ottawa and London, Thunderbird partners with OTT platforms such as Netflix and Amazon Prime and traditional broadcasters like CBC and Discovery. Thunderbird's projects include Highway Thru Hell for Discovery, Oscar winning Blade Runner 2049, CSA winning Kim's Convenience for CBC and Netflix, and the animated Emmy winning series Beat Bugs for Netflix. Thunderbird's animation company, Atomic Cartoons is producing Last Kids on Earth based on the New York Times best selling book series for Netflix and is in development on Eerie Elementary and Princesses Wear Pants adaptations as well.

== Fiore Group of Companies ==
Mr. Giustra is president and CEO of the Fiore Group, a private firm managing a broad portfolio of private equity investments and companies, focussing on natural resources, entertainment, art, food and lifestyle. The portfolio is as varied as Mr. Giustra's interests – Modern Farmer Media Inc., and he is the founder of Domenica Fiore, award-winning Olive Oils which is named after his mother, a company that produces olive oil. His entrepreneurial success includes founding Lionsgate Entertainment, now one of the world's largest independent film companies. Giustra is a major shareholder of Thunderbird Entertainment, a company focused on content and distribution in the television and film sector.

=== Awards ===
2019 Order of Canada, C.M.

== Philanthropy ==
=== The Giustra Foundation ===
The Giustra Foundation (formerly Radcliffe Foundation) was established in 1997 by Frank Giustra. The Vancouver-based foundation supports initiatives focused on women and children, education, homelessness and refugee resettlement in British Columbia and elsewhere in Canada. The Giustra Foundation is involved in the global refugee crisis by providing humanitarian aid, along with being the founding partner in the Global Refugee Sponsorship Initiative.

The Giustra Foundation also has worked with the Vancouver Foundation and the City of Vancouver on Streetohome, a community-based initiative established in 2008 which brings together non-profits, civil society groups, business, governments and citizens to address homelessness in Vancouver. Giustra sits on the board of Streetohome Foundation and chairs the capital campaign. He also donated $5 million to the foundation in 2010.

=== Acceso ===
In 2007, Giustra and President Bill Clinton launched the Clinton Giustra Enterprise Partnership, which in 2020 transitioned into a new independent entity named Acceso. Acceso is a social business builder. Acceso, with support from Giustra, invested start-up capital, built from scratch, and manages agribusinesses in Colombia, El Salvador, and Haiti.

Frank Giustra Social Enterprise Partnership and Initiative CGSGI aims to alleviate poverty in the developing world in partnership with the global mining community. Giustra committed US$100 million plus half of what he earns in the resource industry for the rest of his life. Carlos Slim Helú, the Mexican businessman and one of the richest men in the world, made a matching contribution.

On June 17, 2010, Giustra joined with Carlos Slim and President Clinton to create a $20 million fund to assist small businesses in earthquake-ravaged Haiti.

=== International Crisis Group ===
In 2020, Giustra was named co-chair of the International Crisis Group. He has been a trustee of the International Crisis Group since July 1, 2006, an international, non-profit, non-governmental organization whose mission is to prevent and resolve deadly conflicts through high level advocacy.

In 2005, the foundation began supporting the International Crisis Group, an independent organization working to prevent and resolve deadly conflict on five continents through analysis and high-level advocacy. With the support of Giustra, who sits on the executive committee, and contributions that total $10 million, the International Crisis Group is a leading independent, non-partisan, source of analysis and advice to governments and intergovernmental bodies like the United Nations, European Union, and World Bank on the prevention and resolution of deadly conflict.

== Personal life ==
In 2021, Giustra married Francesca Dutton. His previous marriage was to Alison Lawton, a Canadian investor, activist, and producer of documentary films on humanitarian crises. Giustra and Lawton divorced in 2007 and have two children together.
