= List of Highway Thru Hell episodes =

This is a list of TV episodes for the Discovery Channel Canada reality TV series Highway Thru Hell.

== Series overview ==
Season	Episodes	Originally released	
Season	Episodes	First released	Last released
1	10	September 4, 2012	December 25, 2012
2	13	September 3, 2013	November 19, 2013
3	13	September 2, 2014	November 25, 2014
4	13	September 8, 2015	December 1, 2015
5	13	September 13, 2016	December 6, 2016
6	14	September 5, 2017	December 4, 2017
7	17	September 4, 2018	December 25, 2018
8	17	October 7, 2019	January 27, 2020
9	18	September 14, 2020	January 11, 2021
10	18	September 6, 2021	January 17, 2022
11	18	September 26, 2022	January 9, 2023
12	18	August 21, 2023	January 29, 2024
13	12	January 14, 2025	April 1, 2025
14	12	January 20, 2026	April 7, 2026

== Episodes ==
=== Season 1 (2012) ===
No. overall	No. in season	Title	Original release date
1	1	"Death on the Coq"	September 4, 2012
The winter season is already off to a hellish start when a major blizzard slams the Coquihalla Highway. Jamie Davis Heavy Rescue's "A" team, Adam and Kevin, spends a busy morning clearing spun out semis off the road when word comes that a multi vehicle pile-up has closed down both northbound lanes. While Adam scrambles to get the highway open, Jamie tries to free a semi from a steep, icy off-ramp. Jamie's eldest son, Brandon's first night on the job ended when he discovered a driver fatality crushed by the wheels.
2	2	"Where's My Rotator?"	September 11, 2012
A double-trailer load of lumber had flipped and spilled across a quarter mile of highway. Even with three heavy rescue trucks, Jamie's crew doesn't have enough equipment to do the job right. Adam is angry about the lack of equipment and the poor condition of his truck. Last year, Jamie ordered a state of the art heavy rescue truck called a Rotator. But the busy winter season is here and the custom-built wrecker still hasn't been delivered. Just days before Christmas, Jamie heads to the factory in Tennessee to bring it home himself with his new recruit, Hugo. While they are gone, Adam has his hands full with the B team when a semi filled with expensive wine goes off a cliff.
3	3	"It's Stormy Everywhere"	September 18, 2012
Jamie's having second thoughts about bringing his son Brandon on board when the teenager spends his paycheck on ear piercings. Then his right hand man Kevin shows up to a wreck without the gear he needs to control traffic. When Jamie confronts him, Kevin storms off the job. Jamie's one bright spot is his brand new truck, the Rotator. But even that lets him down when he's called out to save a trailer stuck in a ditch, and only ends up destroying it after Kevin discovered it was weighed down by boxes of cadmium. Next night, little Jamie Jr. joins in as an observer for a seemingly 'easy job', only for Junior to fall asleep in the truck, while Jamie, Kevin and Brandon witnessed two more accidents in deteriorating weather and road conditions, turning it into a multi-car pileup, and Jamie ended up unnecessarily destroying the snow plow.
4	4	"Roughing Up the Rookie"	September 25, 2012
To keep up with a busy season, Jamie hires on a new guy, greenhorn driver Rob. When Rob turns out to be a slow learner - and then goes AWOL during a major blizzard - Jamie's patience is pushed to the breaking point. Out of boredom, a prank on Rob ended on a sour note when news of a reefer truck with frozen foods crashes over a bank that ended up killing the driver, Jamie is forced to bring in a pick-up crew just to do the recovery while Rob guards the trailer. However, with the cables for flipping the truck snapping, Jamie could get eletrocuted under the live electrical cables. Before firing Rob, he decides to give him one last chance when a call comes in for a repo job.
5	5	"No Tears in Towing"	October 2, 2012
Jamie isn't the only tow guy on the Coq. Lone wolf Al Quiring is a tough as nails wrecker and Jamie's main rival, and despite living on the edge of Vancouver, is willing to travel long distances to poach work from Jamie's crew. Their dads did battle a generation ago, now Jamie and Al are fighting it out for the title -"King of the Coq". When the Rotator lands in the shop during an especially busy week by a cheap gasket leakage, Al uses it as a chance to scoop a job off Jamie. Things get more complicated when one of Jamie's new drivers, from the city, learns a close buddy has nearly died in a towing accident during a snowstorm. Ken Monkhouse, who is Vancouver-based, and far more experienced compared to Rob, is working only on commission, and having to hunt for work himself frustrates him, but has to put everything into perspective when he heads to the hospital and comes face to face with the reality of the career he has chosen, and a buddy who has lost his leg, while desperately trying to save the other leg, and was full conscious and aware through the ordeal when it was filmed on the news. To make matters worse, Adam and Hugo must team up with Al and his new driver, Gord, to free up traffic after a multi-truck accident blocked the Coq, as well as racing against each other to get the better cut of the earnings.
6	6	"The Avalanche Zone"	October 9, 2012
Heavy snowfall has created avalanche conditions on the Coq. Plow crews are barely able to keep up. When traffic starts backing up in high-risk avalanche zones, highway authorities decide to close the road in both directions. A team of avalanche techs flies up the mountain in helicopters to drop concussion bombs and release the build-up, but bad weather hampers their first attempt. With the Coq closed overnight, trucks are using the back roads to get through. Jamie's team is called out to recover a semi that went over the cliff on rural Highway 3. The next day is a battle on all fronts to get the Coq open - with helicopter teams dropping more bombs, highway crews faced with two feet of accumulation, and Jamie's team forced to call in a second rotator, who happened to be Jamie's brother, Jason.
7	7	"Family Business"	October 16, 2012
In the mountains of the Pacific Northwest, on the Coquihalla Highway, a small job turns into a major headache and a father's dreams of his stepson joining the family business backfires as Brandon Kodallas' aspirations of being a gym instructor and his disdain to drive a manual transmission vehicles does not sit well with anybody else, while teaching Ken about rigging, something the Richmond-based city towie doesn't do. When Ken and Samy were on their fourth attempt to recover an empty SUV that plunged off the cliff and into a river 1000 feet below, a simple job turned into a lost cause for the company. Brandon walked off on the job after the operation took a lot longer than expected, but next morning, he learns the basics of car recovery and towing, but by the fifth attempt at recovering the car, Jamie gave up calling on Brandon and asked Gord to help. After the job was finally done, Brandon invited Jamie and his wife to his gym and showed him his interpretation of the meaning of 'dedication'.
8	8	"Yin & Yang"	October 23, 2012
Why is one guy always happy, while another is always pissed off? Kevin considers yard man/swamper Samy, a 40-year-old immigrant from Fiji, to be his assistant. When Kevin buys a video camera to film wrecks, his new hobby starts to get in the way of his current job. A head-on collision between two semis has the entire crew battling to clear the charred wreckage and get the road open. While Kevin captures the action on tape, Samy does most of the heavy lifting and dismantling of the burnt wreck, earning him a large bottle of scotch and Jamie's praise, even when he removed the barrel that could have been used to contain an oil leak, which heaped pressure to do a 2-hour salvage operation in just 20-minutes just to open the highway. That night, Samy, who sleeps in Jamie's office during the week, reveals that his hard work is all for his beloved wife and three kids. Meanwhile, Kevin, reviewing his footage at home, reveals that his video hobby started with his father, who worked in TV. When Kevin announced as a teen that he wanted to be a truck driver, his dad cut him off and hasn't seen him in over 20 years. He considers Jamie to be his adopted father. The next day, a harrowing drive up the Coq in dangerous avalanche conditions leaves both Kevin and Samy questioning why they do this for a living. Samy returns to Vancouver to visit his family while Kevin raises safety issues with Jamie. Since Kevin's truck was a converted fire truck, it has no protection from collisions
9	9	"I Can't Take It Anymore!"	October 30, 2012
With spring coming, Jamie is facing a backlog of bills and heavy pressure to cut costs by laying off some of his staff, with Kevin and Samy laid off. When a semi full of mail goes off a cliff, Adam and the weary crew are sent out to unload and recover it. But a long season has everyone's tempers on edge. When a winter-worn cable snaps, narrowly missing Adams head, Jamie's most senior driver threatens to go on strike. In the end of the winter season, Jamie has to be on call to deal with the wrecks alone.
10	10	"After the Crash"	December 25, 2012
HIGHWAY THRU HELL: AFTER THE CRASH catches up with the heavy rescue crew as they reflect over the highs and lows on the mountain last winter. In between highlight clips, showing some of the best and worst times they had the over the season's eight gripping episodes, the guys talk about their toughest wrecks, worst injuries, stormiest weather, tense moments on the team, and why they stick it out despite it all. Jamie talks about being prepared for anything and how his amazing fleet of heavy rescue trucks helps him tackle it all. Ken, the new guy from the city, stops in for a beer and recounts his struggles adjusting to life on the mountain. Brandon, Jamie's 17-year-old stepson and last winter's rookie, takes some heat for his work ethic but isn't afraid to throw it back. As things are heating up, an unexpected visit from arch-rival Al Quiring brings out some serious barbs from Adam. Then Mark turns the tough questions on Kevin, Adam, and the boss himself, Jamie. It all ends with a surprise when Mark invites the guys to see the Coquihalla, and the majestic mountains surrounding it, from an angle they've never experienced: from mid-air in a helicopter.

=== Season 2 (2013) ===
No. overall	No. in season	Title	Original release date
11	1	"Welcome To Winter"	September 3, 2013
Jamie Davis, eager for the winter season to begin, has one thing on his mind - amp up his manpower and his equipment, so he's ready for anything that happens on the mountain. He has brought back a big crew - Adam Gazzola, Narayan Samy, Kevin Ritchie, Rob Mitchell, Bruce Hardy, Ken Monkhouse, the new guy Gord Lundin, and Davis' stepson Brandon Kodallas. Everyone has big, but not always realistic, expectations for the winter ahead. On the first job of the season, Davis' team struggles to find their groove unloading and recovering an expensive B-Train full of lumber for an important client. That night on the Coquihalla, Gazzola is first on site to a grocery truck fully engulfed in flames. With no fire department to help, Gazzola tries out an old fire truck Davis bought for cheap. Ritchie jumps to the task, but the truck is slow to start, and Davis' crew is left to struggle to put out the fire and get the truck off the highway. Later, Davis begins to doubt the optimistic gamble he's made this season and questions if he's brought on too much manpower and possibly the wrong machines.
12	2	"Deadlift"	September 10, 2013
The closures of two major highways cause drivers to voice their frustration leaving Gazzola in a sour mood over all the grief he receives. Ken Monkhouse arrives at a job to find that the competition has gotten the jump on him. Responding to a woodchip wreck, Davis, Gazzola and Ritchie disagree on how to recover the wreck, leaving Davis to do his own swamping. Later, when a heavy SeaCan tips over, Davis and his rotator are pushed to their limit. Monkhouse, realizing he needs help in the car towing division, invites Kodallas for a lesson in a new truck, but Kodallas has words with his stepfather and walks off in a huff. Monkhouse then turns to the new guy - quiet, tattooed Lundin - testing him out on a tough tow lesson.
13	3	"The Comeback Kid"	September 17, 2013
Jamie brings back veteran driver Scott by promising him a new state of the art heavy wrecker. But the new truck is months behind schedule, so Scott has to settle for a worn-out vintage truck. A grueling schedule pushes Adam to his breaking point and he goes AWOL, while Jamie is forced to abandon his Rotator on a backcountry road that is too dangerous to drive.
14	4	"Two Guys, Two Trucks"	September 24, 2013
Tension between Jamie and Adam boils over as they struggle to flip a B-train on a narrow icy road. Adam comes close to quitting, but then backs off when Jamie makes him a promise. A two-car collision closes the snow shed and puts Ken's towing know-how to the test. A truckload of Christmas mail nearly goes off a cliff.
15	5	"Sometimes The Patient Dies"	October 1, 2013
A trailer filled with costly pharmaceuticals gets imbedded in a block of ice. A truckload of frozen chickens crashes into a tangle of trees. 65-year-old Bruce begins to show signs that he may be over the hill. Rob's promotion to lead flagger is short-lived when police revoke his license for speeding.
16	6	"Still Got It"	October 8, 2013
A local competitor challenges Jamie's status on the Hill. A trailer full of cat food bursts into flames - and Scott and Gord have to battle for two days to get the burning heap off the Smasher. Bruce gets into a fight that lands him in the hospital.
17	7	"Crazy Horse"	October 15, 2013
The biggest storm of the season is about to hit the Coq with a fury, just as Jamie discovers that his license has expired. His day gets even worse when Scott smashes the Rotator. When Jamie then gets a call for a dream job it turns into the most challenging recovery of the season.
18	8	"Suck It Up Princess"	October 22, 2013
A semi hits a barrier so hard that it tears off the trailer's rear axle, blocking the Coq's most important exit. Scott tells Jamie he's fed up with the vintage truck he's been driving, and a mysterious new driver shows up in the yard to start work.
19	9	"Over The Edge"	October 29, 2013
Heavy rescue has to recover a severely damaged trailer loaded with millions of plastic beads. Spring rains are causing rock slides on Highway 1. When a B-train loaded with lumber drives off a cliff in order to avoid a boulder, Jamie's called in to recover the wreck before it falls down onto an active railroad line.
20	10	"A Man Of My Word"	November 5, 2013
Jamie and crew wrestle to recover a trailer loaded with apples off a dangerous bridge. A multi-vehicle wreck turns deadly for a Good Samaritan. Scott returns after two weeks of forced vacation, hoping to finally get his new heavy rescue truck.
21	11	"Cut In Half"	November 12, 2013
Adam and Jamie are forced to use some fancy rigging to try to save a wreck on Highway 1 that threatens to spill its load all over the road. When a new competitor rolls onto the mountain and cuts the work in half Jamie is forced to realize he can't afford to keep his world class fleet of trucks on the Coq.
22	12	"Beer O'Clock"	November 17, 2013
Producer and Host Mark Miller joins the crew of Jamie Davis Heavy Rescue for "Beer O'Clock" for a pre-game build up to the season finale. Jamie, Adam, Scott, Ken, Bruce, Kevin and the rest of the guys share beers and trade stories about season 2 on the Coq
23	13	"Closure Is Not An Option"	November 19, 2013
A new competitor on the Coq has cut Jamie's business in half, and the one job he lands in weeks ends up being a complex recovery that no one seems willing to pay for. Heavy rescue faces a life and death decision - shut down or leave the Coq for the oil rush boomtown of Fort McMurray and some steady cash. Determined that "closure is not an option" for Jamie Davis Heavy Rescue, the crew packs up and heads north in search of the new highway thru hell.

=== Season 3 (2014) ===
No. overall	No. in season	Title	Original release date
24	1	"New Hell Old Hell"	September 2, 2014
A new winter season starts with Jamie Davis heavy rescue split in two… Adam has taken half the fleet north to Alberta’s rich and dangerous oil fields while Jamie stays back to fight and keep the Coq open all by himself.
25	2	"New Hope"	September 9, 2014
Jamie hires a new driver named Howie, whose debut is marked by misfortune after crashing the historic teal tow truck while navigating the canyon. Jamie’s stepson Brandon must prove himself after his plans to join the Alberta team are put on hold. A rookie operator named Colin learns just how tough his new boss Adam can be...when a seemingly simple job goes sideways. Howie later overcomes his misfortune by undoing a series of jackknifed semis, which helps a medical van carrying blood packs pass by.
26	3	"Be Afraid"	September 16, 2014
A close call on the highway shows Brandon that fear is his best friend when it comes to staying alive. Jamie’s called to help save a woman trapped in an overturned truck submerged in an icy river. In Alberta, tempers flare in the extreme cold as the new crew is put to the test.
27	4	"No Way Out"	September 23, 2014
A sudden winter storm slams B.C. – but Jamie is powerless to help. Two of Heavy Rescue’s crew face a life-or-death situation on a remote logging road. In Alberta, Adam calls for reinforcements when he just can’t budge a truck that’s flipped over a bank -- forcing Jamie to make a tough decision about moving his flagship Rotator out of B.C.
28	5	"One Man, One Truck"	September 30, 2014
In B.C., a truck full of wine is sliced in half... Less than 24 hours after Jamie ships the Rotator to Alberta. Howie must tackle this monster recovery all on his own. And a cascade of wrecks on two different highways mean both Al Quiring and Adam Gazzola must face their own night from hell.
29	6	"Back in the Saddle"	October 7, 2014
Howie faces a seemingly impossible challenge after a massive wreck spills lumber across a busy highway. With his heavy wrecker in for repairs, Howie must use a few small trucks to try and tackle a very, very big job. In northern Alberta, the Rotator faces its first real test as the crew works to prove they can handle the heavy industrial wrecks and extreme weather.
30	7	"Red Hot Wrecks"	October 14, 2014
In Alberta and B.C., pipe trucks have rolled over and crews in both places race to open vital highways. Things for Al Quiring turn red hot when a trailer jammed with thousands of bottles of hot sauce is ripped open. Jamie and Brandon take a well-deserved break from clearing wrecks on the highway to compete in a car race on a frozen lake.
31	8	"Uphill Battle"	October 21, 2014
A massive build up of snow on the Coq means avalanches are imminent if something isn’t done fast. In Alberta, Adam and Brandon face off in a clash that will change the course of the winter season.
32	9	"Snowmageddon"	October 28, 2014
A record snowfall brings B.C.'s vital Coquihalla Highway to a standstill and sends shockwaves across the region. Howie leads a team on a dangerous recovery that sparks an unexpected emotional reaction. In Alberta, Adam and Colin have to get a toxic chemical wreck safely back on the road.
33	10	"Prove Yourself"	November 4, 2014
The Alberta crew faces a complex recovery with a million dollar truck while Jamie struggles with an unstable wreck. Colin is forced to go it alone after a freak snowstorm leaves the highway littered with crashed vehicles. This episode was dedicated in memory of Bruce "Crazy Horse" Hardy.
34	11	"Top Dog, Lone Wolf"	November 11, 2014
For the first time all season Howie and Adam end up on the same BC wreck and the old Coq vet doesn’t like how the new guy is running the show. In Alberta, the crew faces one of its biggest challenges yet when they attempt a recovery with two big wreckers on a very narrow industrial road.
35	12	"Downhill Slide"	November 18, 2014
In BC, new-hires Phil and Wayne face big problems when they get their chance to run big wreckers. Al runs into trouble on a steep and twisting logging road. In Alberta, Jamie and Adam race to open two highways when both roads to Fort McMurray shut down.
36	13	"Arming For Battle"	November 25, 2014
In the season finale, Adam faces a tough personal choice about his future in Heavy Rescue. Jamie finds himself in harm’s way on one of the most technically difficult recoveries of the year. As Jamie looks ahead to next season, he makes a bold gamble that impacts both his BC and Alberta operations.

=== Season 4 (2015) ===
No. overall	No. in season	Title	Original release date
37	1	"Casualties of War"	September 8, 2015
When winter strikes, Jamie's crew has to save a snowplow stuck in the grip of an icy river. Jamie pushes further into new territory, changes rock the company and the entire community says goodbye to a Heavy Rescue legend.
38	2	"Saved on Preacher's Corner"	September 15, 2015
Jamie's new crew in British Columbia struggles with a mangled trailer on a blind and icy corner of highway 3. When Colin slips up on a big recovery in Alberta, Jamie's brother has to take over the job - even though he's new to the rotator.
39	3	"War Zone"	September 22, 2015
When a lumber truck and diesel tanker collide, the flaming wreckage becomes the biggest recovery of Colin's career. As snowstorms pummel the Coquihalla, Al heads up to battle, while another operator faces off against a mangled tractor.
40	4	"Holidays Thru Hell"	September 29, 2015
Al and Gord battle through a stormy night to keep the Coquihalla Highway open for Christmas. A semi plows off a bridge, stranding holiday travelers, and a remote logging road job forces Ken to relive his close call from last year.
41	5	"Wreck, Recover, Repeat."	October 6, 2015
Al Quiring is in a high-pressure race to open the TransCanada Highway before rush hour. Jordie from Mission Towing faces a semi ready to split in two. Jamie Davis is running a race too when a pharmaceutical truck plunges down a bank.
42	6	"Ice Storm"	October 13, 2015
Freezing rain covers Hope in a thick layer of ice, crippling Jamie's operations. A good friend of Jamie's is called into action when two semis collide head on, leaving wreckage scattered across the TransCanada Highway and a major rail line.
43	7	"You Can't Argue with Gravity"	October 20, 2015
Al and Gord work to rescue a loaded semi that's teetering on the edge of a 300-foot drop. Colin faces a white-knuckle drive on a remote Alberta back road, and Jamie tests out a new driver, who might be in over his head.
44	8	"My Purpose is to Protect"	October 27, 2015
When recovery crews team up for a massive wreck, a close call leads Brandon to reconsider his future in the business; attempts to straighten out a jackknifed truck get twisted.
45	9	"A Moment's Notice"	November 3, 2015
Strategies collide when the Davis and Quiring families team up for a rare joint recovery that shuts down the busiest highway in B.C.; on the Coquihalla Highway, a big rig is left teetering in a seemingly impossible position.
46	10	"Immovable Objects"	November 10, 2015
A simple job turns into an urgent puzzle when a flipped semi pulls Jamie back out on the road; Randy Jacknife faces one of the biggest and heaviest challenges of his career against an overturned truck trapped under its load of steel.
47	11	"Nervous Wreck"	November 17, 2015
Al and Gord gamble on a job that's closed the highway and pushed both green wreckers to the limits; in Alberta, Jamie's crew battles a whiteout to reach a chain reaction wreck; in B.C., a wrecker is called in to help solve an underwater mystery.
48	12	"Rear View"	November 24, 2015
The cast and crew discuss the shows past 4 seasons, including what former drivers of Jamie Davis are currently doing.
49	13	"Fork In The Road"	December 1, 2015
Jamie takes control of the rotator for the first time in months; Jamie turns to his competition for advice about a major decision that will determine the future of Heavy Rescue.

=== Season 5 (2016) ===
No. overall	No. in season	Title	Original release date
50	1	"Less Is More"	September 6, 2016
Jamie Davis battles a truck fire on The Coq, then reveals big changes to his operation. Jordie welcomes his brother back to the family business as they tackles a vehicle in a river. In Alberta, Colin takes on a hazardous load.
51	2	"Suicide Creek"	September 20, 2016
Mission Towing races to an urgent call on a logging road after a truck tumbles 90 feet into a creek. Jamie Davis deploys air bags to flip a bulging tractor trailer loaded with groceries in Alberta. Scott and Mike try to solve a roadside mystery on the Coq.
52	3	"Bridge Out"	September 27, 2016
A jackknifed semi-trailer on the edge of a bridge has Jamie Davis and his Heavy Rescue team on one of the most heart stopping wrecks of the season. On an active logging road in BC's Fraser Canyon, Nik and the Mission Towing team race to finish a recovery and open the road before a convoy of equipment reaches them.
53	4	"Wind Storm"	October 4, 2016
Gale-force winds send a semi airborne and shut down the Trans Canada Highway; Al and Gord try to recover a massive mining truck.
54	5	"Christmas Wrap"	October 11, 2016
On the busiest travel week of the year, Al works to clear a burning tractor trailer off the Coq, and Colin rescues a delivery truck loaded with Christmas parcels.
55	6	"In Deep"	October 18, 2016
On his first night on the Coq, prairie tow operator Jonny Tipton faces his toughest recovery, and Quiring Towing's Gord Boyd clashes with stubborn truckers on the Coq.
56	7	"Man Against Machine"	October 25, 2016
Al Quiring has to rescue a pair of 40-ton excavators buried in a bog, and Jamie and Scott are called to a mysterious wreck in The Canyon.
57	8	"Crossroads"	November 1, 2016
Jordie Duperon and his Mission Towing crew work to clear a wreck that's blocking a rail line; Jamie Davis drivers Scott and Mike help clear the Coq' by towing trucks up a steep grade; Al Quiring returns to pull the second excavator, mired to its roof, out of the bog; Colin gets his first call in weeks.
58	9	"Pick Up Sticks"	November 8, 2016
Jamie calls in Jason's rotator to tackle a recovery in the Canyon, the Mission Towing team juggles a lost load of telephone poles, and emergency responders race to a crash involving one of Jamie's crew.
59	10	"Family Matters"	November 15, 2016
Al Quiring, with his father Bob and his son Cary, deals with a truck hauling massive rolls of paper that's on its side in the ditch; Jaime Davis driver Ken Monkhouse is dealing with health issues; Nik Duperon and Neil Wakefield of Mission Towing deal with a fatal car versus semi accident blocking Highway 7.
60	11	"All Nighter"	November 22, 2016
A spectacular crash between two tractor-trailers has Jordie's crew working through the night. Scott is forced to get 'inventive' to finish a job. Al and Gord try to get a handle on a 30-ton cement drum.
61	12	"Heavy Duty"	November 29, 2016
Jamie's rookie driver Mike is dispatched to rescue a convoy of oversized loads on The Coq. Scott battles to keep a spun out lumber truck from tipping. Mission Towing tries to fish a 40-thousand pound relic out of a river.
62	13	"Long Way Down"	December 6, 2016
Al Quiring attempts to pull up a logging truck that plunged 700 feet off a cliff. Jamie and Scott team up on a heavy roll over in the Fraser Canyon. As winter comes to a close, Nik reflects on his return to heavy rescue while he tackles one final job.

=== Season 6 (2017) ===
No. overall	No. in season	Title	Original release date
63	1	"Cliffhanger"	September 5, 2017
Winter strikes hard and fast as Jamie Davis and his heavy rescue crew face tough new challenges in Hope, BC. A former operator returns, but a spectacular wreck pushes him to the edge on his first mountain recovery.
64	2	"Unfinished Business"	September 12, 2017
Jamie helps Colin recover a massive wreck near the 'Rock Cut'; Brandon confronts his fears on the big job; and Al Quiring finds a unique way to tackle an overturned truck carrying lava rock.
65	3	"Gate Crasher"	September 19, 2017
A troublesome winch line forces Jamie and his cousin to find a quick fix; big changes for Jordie, as he faces a twisted wreck that crashed through an airport fence; and Al tries to save a logging truck from a rising river.
66	4	"Slippery Slope"	September 26, 2017
A crash in the Fraser Canyon has Colin and crew working below an unstable rock slope. Jamie charts a new course for his business - setting out on a 2,000 km journey. A heavy rescue 'legend' shows up to help Dylan on an icy recovery.
67	5	"Perfect Storm"	October 3, 2017
A winter storm unleashes chaos on all highways around Hope, BC forcing Jamie's team into an all-night battle. Jason and Merv tangle with a loaded semi in the snow-filled Valley but later Merv gets to have some fun on the Coquihalla.
68	6	"Python Unleashed"	October 10, 2017
Jamie's newest classic wrecker 'The Python' is put to the test on a semi embedded in a row of trees. Ken and Dylan fight to recover a flipped logging truck off an icy mountain road. Later Jamie makes a special trip to Mission Towing.
69	7	"Hell of a Ride"	October 17, 2017
A truck driver survives a spectacular crash on 'The Coq' during a nasty snowstorm. Hampered by heavy snow, rocks and extreme cold - Colin and Kelly must finish the tough recovery and meet a tight deadline for Jamie Davis.
70	8	"Reading the Road"	October 24, 2017
An oversized load tests Jamie and his rebuilt wrecker HR-126 and a gravel hauler ricochets off a rock wall leaving a twisted mess for Kelly and John. Swamper Gord Lundin gets a chance to operate his own tow truck.
71	9	"Snowbound"	October 31, 2017
Jamie and his fleet of heavy wreckers are paralyzed in his own yard by a massive overnight snowfall. A 'tow-up' in deep powder turns into big trouble for Colin. Al and Gord race to rescue a teetering semi during the morning rush on Hwy 1.
72	10	"Junior's Job"	November 7, 2017
Jamie's 13-year-old son gets a steep lesson in wreck recovery after a semi crashes down a 150-foot embankment. Rock slides north of Hope, BC trigger road closures and an explosive clean up led by Rasta Blasta. Dylan goes waist-deep to fish a truck out of a lake.
73	11	"Bumpy Ride"	November 14, 2017
The Python gets a workout as Jamie takes the old school wrecker 'off road' for the first time. Jamie's brother Kelly battles high winds and a power pole to save a semi loaded with pipes. Gord Boyd picks up a brand new heavy wrecker for Quiring Towing.
74	12	"Trapped"	November 21, 2017
A missing truck driver trapped inside a wreck for two consecutive days draws Jamie Davis Heavy Rescue and first responders into one of the most difficult and emotional recoveries in years. Unfortunately, the rescued driver later died upon arrival at the hospital.
75	13	"No Man's Land"	November 28, 2017
A wild winter storm forces officials to shut down BC's Coquihalla HWY. Working through blinding snow, freezing rain and an avalanche threat - heavy rescue crews battle to help drivers out of the 'closure zone' and off the mountain highway.
76	14	"Hooked"	December 4, 2017
Season Finale - Jamie Davis travels across North America to explore the roots of heavy rescue. From the invention of the first tow truck, to the latest modern machines, Jamie explores how tow trucks have changed the world. Then, his classic restoration project - The 'Mighty Mo' - finally comes to life.

=== Season 7 (2018) ===
No. overall	No. in season	Title	Original release date
77	1	"Heavy Recall"	September 4, 2018
Jamie, Al, Jason, and Ken look back at each other's recoveries from season 6 and take a look ahead at the new season.
78	2	"A Mighty Winter"	September 11, 2018
Jamie's restored classic wrecker faces its first test; Colin, Merv and Jason attempt a heavy rescue; Al battles with an excavator buried in a rock-slide.
79	3	"Double Trouble"	September 18, 2018
Mission Towing's Dylan Greenwood has to solve a puzzle of twisted metal when two big rigs collide. Jamie takes his Python wrecker off-road to rescue a propane truck, while Al Quiring has to save a snowplow hit by a semi on the Coquihalla.
80	4	"Mud Slide"	September 25, 2018
Heavy rains trigger a massive mudslide near Hope, B.C. cutting off the Trans-Canada Highway and forcing Jamie's team to work in the kill-zone to recover a buried semi. Mission Towing has to rescue a dump truck teetering on a slippery slope.
81	5	"Bridge Battle"	October 2, 2018
Al and Gord are called in to winch a 65-ton steel bridge across the Coquihalla River; Jamie takes a bad fall while operating'Mighty Mo; a new recruit is put to the test on an epic backroad recovery.
82	6	"Whiteout Workout"	October 9, 2018
Colin takes the controls of Mighty Mo during a whiteout storm; Dylan encounters a semi on the edge of a cliff; Jamie and Paris attempt to bring an old dozer back to life.
83	7	"Cold Gold"	October 16, 2018
Al and Gord search for a lost logging truck on a snowy back road; Jamie attempts a maneuver with Mighty Mo; Colin faces his fear while working on a semi.
84	8	"Wreck From Hell: Part 1"	October 23, 2018
Jamie heads north in B.C. to rescue a tractor trailer that tipped on its side.
85	9	"Wreck From Hell: Part 2"	October 30, 2018
Jamie faces his toughest wreck in years, so he calls in a familiar face and a 50-ton rotator; Al attempts to free a 70-ton excavator from a mud hole.
86	10	"Push and Pull"	November 6, 2018
A tour bus spins out of control, launching Al Quiring into action; Jamie gets to test a heavy-duty weapon bolted to the front of Mighty Mo; a new team on The Coq takes on a trailer with live pigs.
87	11	"Road To Ruin"	November 13, 2018
Merv's called up The Coq to help Reliable Towing untangle three major wrecks less than a kilometre apart; Dylan races to recover a car dangling on a bridge; Colin rolls up on a heavy rescue head scratcher
88	12	"Heartburn"	November 20, 2018
Out of the frying pan and into the fire for Al, An unexpected detour becomes a night of heavy rescue for Collin, an offroad mission threatens to bog down Ken.
89	13	"Above and Beyond"	November 27, 2018
A massive pileup plunges Al's son into the middle of a disaster. A half million dollar load becomes a balancing act. Jamie brings back a load from the Yukon.
90	14	"Battle Scars"	December 4, 2018
A lost load of lumber stacks the odds against team Reliable. A bad flu forces Jamie to send a new driver into battle. A tough pull pushes Mighty Mo too far.
91	15	"Entombed"	December 11, 2018
Jamie feels winter's bite on a frozen recovery. A humbling hill and a crumbling fix. A brutal, back road mission on a burned-out wreck.
92	16	"Rock Slide"	December 18, 2018
A back road battle roughs up Jamie. A race to clear the Coq has Dylan spun around. A close call puts Al in the crush zone.
93	17	"The General"	December 25, 2018
A load of heavy pipes has two teams locked in an all-out battle. A steep mountain road puts Ken on the edge. A legendary truck makes a triumphant return.

=== Season 8 (2019–20) ===
No. overall	No. in season	Title	Original release date
94	1	"Winter Strikes"	October 7, 2019
On B.C.'s Coquihalla Highway, an early snowfall catches truckers off guard and puts Jamie Davis face to face with a heavy fuel tanker; sparks fly when James Luke and The Black Sheep try to rescue a semi in deep snow.
95	2	"Battle in the Gravel"	October 14, 2019
Jamie tests the limits of his classic wrecker against a rock crusher in a gravel pit, Mitch and James scramble to save a truck and camper on an icy cliff, and Colin finally gets a crack at Mighty Mo's push bumper.
96	3	"Chain Saw"	October 21, 2019
When a dump truck and trailer crash into dense bush, Al Quiring and Sons become heavy rescue lumberjacks; with the help of Gord Boyd, Team Green overcame environmental obstacles and a twisted wreck trapped in the trees.
97	4	"Oil and Water"	October 28, 2019
In Hope, Jamie, Colin and Cam battle heavy rains to recover a rolled semi blocking the highway through town; with traffic to The Coq cut off and a trailer full of cooking oil starting to rip, Jamie's crew must get the road open.
98	5	"Return to Sender"	November 4, 2019
Near Merritt, a parcel delivery truck is torn open, scattering hundreds of packages across The Coq; Reliable Towing overcomes numerous obstacles to clear the wreck.
99	6	"Thin Ice"	November 11, 2019
The team have to attempt a cliffside recovery on the banks of the Coldwater River - and they're on thin ice. Colin makes a repair during a winter storm. Al and Gord race to move a house off a busy highway.
100	7	"Heavy Hearts"	November 18, 2019
Merv is dispatched in Aggressive Towing's 50-ton rotator to open the road after a collision in Fraser Valley; Jamie takes a classic wrecker on a 2,000-kilometre journey north; news about a key member of the Mission Towing family hits home.
101	8	"Road to Recovery"	November 25, 2019
A tractor trailer clinging to the edge of a mountain has Mitch, Merv and James pulling together to save the load; after years of relying on older equipment, Jamie Davis brings home a surprise for the team.
102	9	"Door to Door"	December 2, 2019
James Luke and Black Sheep rush to clear a tractor trailer on its side loaded with heavy doors. An 18-wheeler filled with firewood tests Cam and Colin.
103	10	"Sub Zero"	December 9, 2019
A polar vortex brings extreme cold and brutal working conditions to truck drivers and heavy wrecker operators on The Coq; Colin fights to recover a frozen rig; Cam finds himself in a dilemma with one of Jamie's classic wreckers.
104	11	"Lives on the Line"	December 16, 2019
A terrifying crash involving one of their own shocks Team Reliable; Dylan and Merv pair up to lift a heavy load of steel pilings off a highway; Cam races to rescue a fellow tow operator stuck on a blind corner.
105	12	"Double Crossed"	December 23, 2019
Mitch discovers a massive wreck involving two semis; Reliable and Aggressive Towing join forces to recover a pair of entangled 18-wheelers; a tippy trailer abandoned on a soft shoulder tests Jamie; Gord finds himself in deep in a peat bog.
106	13	"Off Road"	December 30, 2019
Jamie and his tow brothers discuss some of their toughest adventures over the years, while Al, Ken, Jason and Mitch share tales and advice with one another on some of their most spectacular off-road recoveries.
107	14	"Rock and a Hard Place"	January 6, 2020
Brandon and Cam team up to rescue a lumber truck tangled in a rock face on Highway 3; Al digs out a buried semi on a notorious corner on The Coq; a tractor fire puts James in the hot seat.
108	15	"Fried Chicken"	January 13, 2020
Near Hope, B.C., a burning truck hauling frozen chicken has Cam and Jamie in a race to move the smoky hazard off the highway; a flipped logging truck near Merritt turns into a tussle for Mitch and James.
109	16	"The Warrior"	January 20, 2020
A lost load of lumber pulls Jamie and Colin Mclean into a battle on the banks of B.C.'s Skagit River; Al takes a chance with Big Green to rescue a sinking excavator; James and Rooster wrestle a twisted wreck near Merritt.
110	17	"Fire Mountain"	January 27, 2020
After surviving a near-fatal heart attack, Ken leads the Mission crew on its most daunting recovery in years; lodged in the trees, 200 feet below a mountain road, the damaged dump truck pushes Ken's team to the edge of disaster.

=== Season 9 (2020–21) ===
No. overall	No. in season	Title	Original release date
111	1	"Dead Man's Curve"	September 14, 2020
The season's first snowstorm paralyzes the Coquihalla Summit, launching Al Quiring and Gord Boyd into battle; Jamie Davis and a new operator from Ireland tackle a torn-up semi on a dangerous corner.
112	2	"Winch Wizard"	September 21, 2020
A rolled logging truck launches Jamie Davis and his heavy wreckers to a remote crash site in British Columbia; Reliable Towing's James Luke scrambles to disconnect a flaming tractor from its trailer and is assisted by a surprising new hire.
113	3	"Jailhouse Wreck"	September 28, 2020
Ken Duperon is on his first job since his heart attack; a familiar face switches teams and leads Reliable Towing on a major recovery.
114	4	"Burning Treasure"	October 5, 2020
A raging truck fire tests Dylan and Team Reliable; a valuable surprise in the ashes; Jamie's rookie operator and veteran mechanic pair up to rescue a broken down semi.
115	5	"Frozen Stiff"	October 12, 2020
An extreme arctic blast descends on Hope, BC delivering brutal cold and a bone-chilling battle for Jamie and his brother Jason; Al's son Cary is unexpectedly called in to cover for his father on the Coq Summit for the first time.
116	6	"Tanked"	October 19, 2020
A tanker crash in Fraser Canyon lands rookie operator Greg Mulligan in the middle of an epic recovery; faced with 47-thousand litres of diesel and a mass of twisted metal, Greg's luck turns when Merv and Aggressive Towing's 50-ton rotator arrive.
117	7	"Jackknife Mountain"	October 26, 2020
Gord Boyd races to clear a jackknifed semi as snow plows battle to keep The Coq moving; a loaded 18-wheeler on the edge of a cliff tests Reliable Towing's Cam and Chace; a lost trucker needs help backing down a dark road.
118	8	"Cold Comfort"	November 2, 2020
A recovery on The Coq turns into a roadside emergency for Team Reliable; Jamie and new operator Greg Mulligan get more than they bargained for when a semi plows into a snowbank.
119	9	"Blown Away"	November 9, 2020
High winds in BC's Fraser Valley flip a trailer on a bridge and blow away Ken and the Mission crew; Reliable Towing's James Luke and Mitch Karr battle 70-kph wind gusts to recover a wreck loaded with lumber.
120	10	"Hats And Jalapenos"	November 16, 2020
Two transport trucks make contact, ripping open their trailers and shutting down the main highway outside Golden BC; the crash launches Jamie Davis and his classic wrecker The General from his new winter base.
121	11	"Washout"	November 23, 2020
Torrential rain and a raging river threatens Jamie's operation in Hope, BC; Al Quiring goes fishing for logs to save a community from flooding; a jackknifed semi hauling bottles of water tests Rick and Brandon.
122	12	"Blood, Sweat and Tears"	November 30, 2020
Jamie gets a painful reminder of the hazards of being hands on while working on Mighty Mo; two simultaneous wrecks on the same stretch of The Coq double the pressure on Team Reliable.
123	13	"Edge Of Disaster"	December 7, 2020
A back road job drifts towards disaster when James Luke's 30-ton wrecker Black Sheep starts sliding backwards; a tree through a trucker's windshield launches Brian up The Coq; Jamie's tow buddy Big John tackles a head-on crash near Revelstoke, BC.
124	14	"Up In Smoke"	December 14, 2020
Black smoke billowing above the Fraser Valley sends fire crews and Ken Duperon racing to the Mission Towing yard; a cracked trailer in deep snow becomes a delicate recovery for Rick and Brandon.
125	15	"Weather The Storm"	December 21, 2020
Jamie Davis and the cast look back at some of their biggest battles with Mother Nature; Al, Merv, Colin, James and Ken Duperon discuss how each extreme weather condition has impacted recoveries; plus, a tribute to one of Jamie's original crewmembers.
126	16	"Close Calls"	January 4, 2021
Cam narrowly escapes a deadly crash when his 50-ton wrecker is struck from behind; Jamie and Greg climb into the backcountry to rescue an articulating rock truck clinging to a mountain slope.
127	17	"The Bait"	January 11, 2021
Jamie attempts to lure back former lead operator Colin McLean by ordering his dream truck; Team Reliable tackles a smashed semi with a super-sized load of French fries; A blown tire launches a dump truck into the ditch and two teams into action.
128	18	"Reunited"	January 18, 2021
Just in time for one of Jamie's most challenging recoveries this season, a familiar face shows up at the yard and is recruited to help save a loaded car carrier; Al and Gord travel north to an epic job near a gold mining town.

=== Season 10 (2021–22) ===
No. overall	No. in season	Title	Original release date
129	1	"Red Truck Wreck"	September 6, 2021
Gord is tested by the snowfall, and the Reliable crew's military rotator faces double trouble where no roads go.
130	2	"Back For More"	September 13, 2021
Al comes to the rescue of an overconfident driver, team Reliable gains a fiery personality, and Gary faces a heavyweight challenge.
131	3	"Legacy On The Line"	September 20, 2021
A logging truck tangled down a steep bank brings the entire Mission Towing roster out to battle. A surprise storm launches James Luke into unusual territory. Team Green takes on a dozer sunk into a peat bog; a legendary tow family faces a crossroads.
132	4	"Legend On Scene"	September 27, 2021
Jamie and Brandon respond to a semi sucked into a muddy ditch; a familiar face eyes a legendary tow company; Reliable's 50-ton wrecker takes on a tricky recovery; an upside-down camper and star-studded vintage pickup test a newly-formed team.
133	5	"The Golden Ticket"	October 4, 2021
The biggest storm of winter yet sees an accident involving highway crew; Scott Bird takes on his first mountain storm in years with a greenhorn riding shotgun.
134	6	"Bent Metal Dynasty"	October 11, 2021
A crash brings Greg and Brian out for action; Team Aggressive wrangles a teetering truck; MSA takes on a major recovery affecting the busiest stretch of highway in B.C.
135	7	"Hard as a Rock"	October 18, 2021
Jamie and his team battle a B-train that's taken a deep dive on punishing terrain; Al takes on a spun-out trucker to keep an army of plows moving; Al's son Cary steps up in a quarter-million-dollar house move.
136	8	"Black Ice Mayhem"	October 25, 2021
Greg responds to a crash after black ice forms on the Coq; heavy winter rains launch MSA into an epic fight with a big machine in a mudpit; an accident hits close to home for Brandon; Scott mentors the next generation on a defiant wreck.
137	9	"Redline Warriors"	November 1, 2021
Gord is called on to rescue an unpredictable trucker; Big John and Rick Wood face the wreck of a lifetime; a stolen pickup dumped far up a snowy logging road reunites Dylan with his former boss and pushes Reliable's military rotator to its limits.
138	10	"Holly Jolly Chaos"	November 8, 2021
Scott is dealt polar opposites in a surprise storm; Big John takes on a tractor buried in big timber; Merv gets a mangled holiday surprise; James Luke takes the next generation on a tow; an old friend brings a special gift for Jamie.
139	11	"High And Low"	November 15, 2021
Dylan and Brandon attempt to recover a tippy sem. James Luke and Cary battle to save a unique machine, as MSA Towing navigates unusual conditions. Jamie's classic iron is pushed to its limits with a wreck that doesn't add up.
140	12	"Heavy Liftoff"	November 22, 2021
Al recruits reinforcements to get truckers moving; Dylan faces a heavy breakdown on a remote job; Merv pilots a warplane through a city while Brian and Greg grapple with a mysterious load.
141	13	"Double Down"	November 29, 2021
A double-rotator recovery has the Aggressive team on the edge; a crash near the border tests Kirpal and his sons; Dylan takes Reliable's offroad warrior out for its first blacktop battle; Rooster is on the front lines of recovery and fatherhood
142	14	"Long Lines"	December 6, 2021
Jamie and Greg fight an uphill battle against a flipped excavator; Big John is challenged by a defiant semi; Dylan and Scott test their teamwork on a technical recovery.
143	15	"The Toll"	December 13, 2021
Aggressive Towing's Merv and Team Green's Cary Quiring battle a twisted dump truck wreck; On the Coq, Jamie's mechanic Brian Rush is dispatched to recover a 4x4 car 150 feet into the ditch; A back-road assignment near Harrison Lake has Mission Towing attempting to recover a bush buggy lodged 200 feet below
144	16	"Fly Or Fall"	January 3, 2022
Team Reliable is in foggy chaos; Ken turns an off-road recovery into a joyride; Greg takes charge on his biggest recovery without the boss; Gord hustles to open the Coq's steepest stretch.
145	17	"Hell In The Canyon"	January 10, 2022
Jamie and his brother team up for the most stunning wreck of the season; Al hauls a unique piece of equipment on a treacherous backroad; Brandon and highway crews face a difficult night on the Coq; Jamie adds a wrecker like no other to his fleet.
146	18	"Heavy Rescue Decade"	January 17, 2022
Jamie and the other Heavy Rescue businesses reminisce over the last 10 years of rescues.

=== Season 11 (2022–23) ===
No. overall	No. in season	Title	Original release date
147	1	"Hell and High Water"	September 26, 2022
Jamie's new operator hits a Coquihalla mudslide, while highway crews are in a life or death race to evacuate motorists and save vital infrastructure. Team Reliable braves floodwaters to rescue stranded residents.
148	2	"No Thru Road"	October 3, 2022
With all highways closed after unprecedented flooding, drivers and residents are trapped in Hope as a raging creek threatens Jamie's shop and family home. Dylan tries to rescue a trapped family surrounded on all sides by a river gone wild.
149	3	"Wreck and Rebuild"	October 10, 2022
Jamie's brother Jason fears for his home after being evacuated by air. Reliable clears vehicles in a slide zone to help reopen the first highway out of Hope. The Coquihalla Highway rebuild begins in a race against winter.
150	4	"Recover Stronger"	October 17, 2022
Team Reliable's James Luke and over 20 tow trucks must recover 200 cars in a mudslide zone in mere hours as a second atmospheric river threatens the Fraser Valley. The military is brought in to help engineer solutions.
151	5	"A Fighting Chance"	October 24, 2022
Cary Quiring is tasked with keeping crucial goods flowing. A wreck that brings three heavies out tests Jamie's new LA Rotator. Aggressive Towing tackles a sideways transport.
152	6	"Ripper Hill"	October 31, 2022
James Luke and the Reliable team contend with two detoured wrecks on the same punishing corner of a narrow route. MSA's Kirpal Banwait and sons must stretch a long line to reach a machine stuck on a farm.
153	7	"Let It Snow"	November 7, 2022
Al and Merv team up for a snowy tug of war. With the Canyon Highway closed, Jamie battles a fuel tanker to keep trains moving. A blockage on the only route through the Cascade Mountains forces MSA into a bold move.
154	8	"Deep Freeze"	November 14, 2022
Bone-chilling temperatures challenge the teams to pull off recoveries in punishing conditions. Dylan pushes Reliable's military rotator in a new way. Media gets a sneak peek at an extraordinary repair effort on Coquihalla, closed after the floods.
155	9	"On The Road Again"	November 21, 2022
Aggressive Towing copes with a slick situation in the Valley while Reliable's new Highway 3 base battles a snowstorm. Jamie, Al and Kurtis hit the Coquihalla on an emotional day.
156	10	"Wreck Attack"	November 28, 2022
A flash freeze launches Team Green into action. Dylan heads a two-wrecker recovery of a toppled lumber truck. Jason tackles a two-piece gravel wreck. A snowy recovery deals Jamie an unexpected snag. Reliable's Ty and Chris search for a wreck in the mudflats.
157	11	"Get 'Er Done"	December 5, 2022
Aggressive Towing mobilizes both rotators to help MSA on back-to-back recoveries. Two young Reliable Mission up-and-comers are hours from civilization when a back-road recovery goes into night. Greg is helped by Jamie on a jackknife in winter.
158	12	"Shot at Redemption"	December 12, 2022
Jamie and the next generation take on an airbag wreck similar to a challenging one from the past; Dylan must rely on roadside ingenuity against a sideways semi; Al and Gord deal with four wheelers on the Coq.
159	13	"Far And Wide"	December 19, 2022
Jamie and his LA Rotator attack a b-train alone; Cary Quiring is under pressure to contain a hazardous problem and clear the highway; MSA discovers a repeat customer in a tough quagmire.
160	14	"Step Up"	December 26, 2022
A fiery multi-vehicle crash is attacked by Dylan and new recruit Steph; Aggressive Towing takes on a two-rotator suburban showdown under live power lines; Jamie throws the next generation into the fire in the remote back-country.
161	15	"Double Carnage"	January 2, 2023
Jamie and Rick tackle a massive double recovery; Heavy fog tests Reliable's newest hire; Big John trains a familiar face to operate a heavy on an unusual jackknife; John and his daughter take on a wreck with a twist.
162	16	"Triple Play"	January 2, 2023
Aggressive's Jason and Merv team up with MSA's Kirpal and Sons for a triple wrecker recovery; Ty, Andy and a heavy recovery hopeful take on a mudslide wreck; Dylan, Rooster and Andy get pushed to their limits by a heavy transport frozen in.
163	17	"Know When To Hold 'Em"	January 9, 2023
Jamie helps the victim of a crash; Dylan and team Reliable return for another swing at a heavy transport frozen in; Merv helps out Reliable's Ty for the final battle in a mudslide; Big John has a high-stakes unload and a semi stuck in the forest; Jamie shows his daughter the ropes on a back-road tow.
164	18	"Rise Up"	January 9, 2023
Aggressive and Quiring Towing unite forces to take on a snowy recovery that threatens to fall apart; Reliable's Ty and Andy fight swamped-in heavy equipment; Jamie and his crew take on a gigantic haul; Kurtis Brown looks back on a season like no other.

=== Season 12 (2023–24) ===
No. overall	No. in season	Title	Original release date
165	1	"Endless Summer"	August 21, 2023
Jamie is on high alert with a wildfire threatening his own backyard in Hope; Team Aggressive must navigate tinder dry conditions on a back road bush recovery; Reliable Towing wrangles an overturned cattle hauler under smoke-filled skies.
166	2	"Triple Threat"	August 28, 2023
Jamie joins forces with brother Jason and Aggressive Towing to pull off a triple rotator job on the Canyon Highway, Team Reliable's Ty and Andy contend with trees and tight space to pull out an RV, Jamie gets emotional when one of his favorite trucks goes down in flames.
167	3	"Billion Dollar Pull"	September 4, 2023
Jamie clears a snowed-in semi at the foot of the Rockies before an avalanche control operation ends. Al fills a crucial role in a billion dollar infrastructure project. Reliable's Ty and Andy wrestle a wreck to keep rush hour moving. Dylan uses the military rotator on an icy back-road recovery.
168	4	"Killer's Corner"	September 11, 2023
MSA and Reliable team up for a wreck on the Canyon Highway's notorious Killer's Corner. Jamie uses a rollover as an opportunity to teach crew new skills. Team Quiring meet the challenge of a swamped-in dump truck with a bulldozer. The anniversary of last year's catastrophic floods is cause for reflection.
169	5	"Bold Moves"	September 18, 2023
Reliable's team are challenged by a sideways semi that could lose its load of groceries at any moment. A snowstorm keeps Al busy while BC Highway Patrol arms motorists to brave the Coquihalla. AJ does a solo job for Jamie, battling through deep snow on a back road.
170	6	"Deliver The Goods"	September 25, 2023
Merv helps Abbotsford Police deal with a wreck on the vital Highway 11 route to the US border. Team Reliable battles a twisted lumber b-train shutting down Highway 7. MSA's Kirpal works with his son Gurk to rescue a semi on the verge of tipping into a ditch. Jamie is impressed by AJ's skills when they rescue a trailer from a landslide.
171	7	"Head On"	October 16, 2023
A crash on the Canyon Highway requires the technical skills of Hope to rescue the driver; Dylan mentors reliable operator Stephanie on her first heavy job; a new team in the north takes on a huge job with the help of a crane truck
172	8	"Blacktop Whiteout"	October 23, 2023
Team Aggressive navigates their way through the snowy chaos to join Reliable Towing's Dylan on a recovery. Jamie uses his LA Rotator to help truckers stuck in the snow. Highways Maintenance and Al have their hands full guiding drivers up the highway. AJ braves the snowy back-country by himself to rescue a stuck service truck.
173	9	"When It Hits Home"	October 30, 2023
Jamie's on high alert as he's the first responder to a pileup while on his way to another crash. Team Quiring works with BC Highway Patrol to clear a multi-vehicle crash on Highway 1. A shocking crash into a residential home.
174	10	"Wrecker and Goliath"	November 6, 2023
Team MSA debuts their brand new 35-ton up on the Coquihalla to take on their first double heavy job with their own trucks. Aggressive Towing's junior operator Jaydan struggles to pull out a severe jackknife. Blistering winds test Jamie with a subzero recovery.
175	11	"Brothers In Tow"	November 13, 2023
Al and Jamie have a rare reunion while working the summit of the Coquihalla highway; John and Andy must close a vital brake check while recovering a rolled-over semi; team Aggressive uses an unconventional solution.
176	12	"Rolling Solo"	November 20, 2023
Al heads to a semi in a snowbank but a second rig hits it before he gets there; Jamie puts his LA Rotator to the test on a technical elevated roadway recovery; Kyle wrestles with doing a dump truck rollover without the help of his Uncle Rob.
177	13	"Home Delivery"	November 27, 2023
Merv leads Team Aggressive to get a lumber b-train out of the ditch. Reliable Towing races to recover a semi down a deep bank off the highway. Don and Mike from Peninsula Towing play a vital role in getting a house to a waiting barge before the tide goes out.
178	14	"Pileup Under the Mistle-Tow"	December 4, 2023
As the holiday season approaches, Reliable Towing is faced with their biggest wreck of the season. Jamie enlists Rob's log truck driving experience to pilot a torn-up trailer safely down Highway 1. Merv uses the full might of his rotator to right a flipped crane truck.
179	15	"Twisted Metal"	January 8, 2024
A winter storm bears down on the Coquihalla as Team Reliable takes on a twisted trailer; Abbotsford Police and CVSE run a joint operation to clamp down on trucker safety violations; Jamie rescues a pickup that goes off the highway.
180	16	"Forever a Trucker"	January 15, 2024
At the foot of the Rockies, a jackknifed semi puts the pressure on AJ as he runs a heavy for the first time; Jamie brings his LA Rotator out to help a local tow company recover a loaded tractor-trailer; Ty and Andy take on a waterlogged excavator.
181	17	"Is This How It All Ends?"	January 22, 2024
Jamie lives out his worst nightmare when he's part of a massive crash that takes out his LA Rotator; Al helps a relative haul a superload up the hill; AJ and James Junior must rely on their know-how to pull a brand-new pickup out of the mud.
182	18	"Turning The Page"	January 29, 2024
AJ is excited to do his first tow-up on the Coquihalla but he's forced to make it work with only a medium-duty wrecker; Jamie feels the loss of his heavies this season as he does a snowy recovery on the summit.

=== Season 13 (2025) ===
No. overall	No. in season	Title	Original release date
183	1	"Worth The Weight"	January 14, 2025
Jamie realizes he's been given the wrong information; Team Reliable wrestles with a cable barrier on Highway 1; Aggressive Towing battles with a heavy B-train down a deep ditch in the Fraser Valley.
184	2	"More Than We Bargained For"	January 21, 2025
Jamie's return to the nightmare of a wreck in the mountains turns into an epic family effort; Merv schools Jaydan on a back road job in East Harrison; Al has family safety on his mind while negotiating a live lane recovery.
185	3	"Mudslide Mayhem"	January 28, 2025
Team MSA takes on their most challenging recovery ever when a tanker is sucked down a hill by a mudslide. Up in Quesnel, Rob from Autotow does his first pull-up on their own "Mini Coq." while back down south, Reliable Towing's newest operators, Bob and Keelan, are forced to call in Andy for help on a massive logging B-train wreck. Then it's a father-daughter training day when Jamie takes Alexis on her first dolly tow job.
186	4	"Crash and Burn"	February 4, 2025
Bob from Reliable Towing wrestles with a burning semi on the side of the Coquihalla, but when he finally hauls it away, a semi crashes into him, bringing out all of the Reliable Merritt to his aid. Jamie hauls a snowcat for a snowmobile club in the Rockies, piquing his curiosity about the local winter recreation. Team MSA brings Gursharan's brother-in-law Kulji to his first recovery job on the busy Fraser Highway.
187	5	"A Tow Man's Worst Nightmare"	February 11, 2025
Team Reliable's Laine must juggle training two junior operators while clearing a flipped semi, shutting down Highway 3. Al wrestles a broken trailer with a fragile load off the busy Highway 1 in the Fraser Valley while Jamie climbs into the mountains to rescue European tourists and their imported motorhome off a backroad. Then Merv and Jaydan tag team to recover a specialized roll-off truck from a watery ditch.
188	6	"Sink or Swin"	February 18, 2025
Jamie is forced to reckon with the trauma of his L.A. Rotator crash last year while dealing with his newest wrecker breaking down during a long haul. Merv takes on an unusual job pulling a sunken barge out of the river. Bob Potts makes his return to Team Reliable and does his first recovery after his own crash. AJ rescues a vital firewood delivery truck before paying a visit to a veteran walking the highway for mental health awareness.
189	7	"Family Affair"	February 25, 2025
Reliable Towing lead operator Andy finds himself in Golden to lend his expertise to the team working an incredibly jackknifed semi on Highway 1. In Quesnel, Rob and Kyle navigate tight spaces around a tippy tractor-trailer on Highway 97. Cary honours his family's legacy by using his late grandfather's old wrecker to rescue a trail worker's equipment in the Fraser Valley while in the mountains, Jamie is impressed by his twin daughter's skills while recovering a car on a snowy backroad. Then Kirpal teaches his eldest son Gursharan a lesson in resilience as they pull a stubborn pump truck out of a muddy ditch.
190	8	"The Whole Coquihalla Highway Is Relying On You, Buddy"	March 4, 2025
With a major storm front about to hit the Coquihalla, Al Quiring must coordinate with Kurtis Brown's highways maintenance teams as they lock in for a night of "Snowshed Protocol." At the top of the Coq, Jamie brings out Might Mo to help out some newer tow operators on the Coq rescue a semi before the storm lands, and as night falls, Team Reliable's Andy and John Dods join the race against the storm to wrestle a tipping semi out of the ditch. Days later, Jamie is visited by Colin and reveals the completion of a passion project that's been more than 8 seasons in the making.
191	9	"Turning The Tide"	March 11, 2025
Merv bringing his rotator to the big city of Vancouver to help recover a stranded boat in False Creek, Team Reliable fighting wet conditions to pull a jackknifed semi out of the ditch on Highway 1, Jamie Davis' long haul driver Mitch Mahood making the jump to heavy operator when he rescues a frozen semi on the Coq with Mighty Mo, and Autow's uncle and nephew team fighting the freeze to untangle a lumber truck b-train from a massive spill on Highway 97.
192	10	"Dashing Thru The Tow"	March 18, 2025
Jamie working a semi recovery off the highway without his go-to heavy wreckers, Sim racing to finish a recovery when he learns his in-law has been in a nearby crash, Cary feeling the pressure of safety traversing the Coquihalla when he trades his tow truck for a semi, BC Highway Patrol launching a province-wide road safety operation for the holidays, and the tow companies all celebrate the festive season in their local communities.
193	11	"Hook, Line and Wincher"	March 25, 2025
Reliable prairie boy Evan Purdy puts his wrecker to the test recovering a truck broken in two from a narrow bridge, Al Quiring flexing his technical skills on a massive dump truck spill on Highway 3, Autow's Kyle Langlois takes the lead on a burnt-out wreck on an icy Highway 97. Jaydan Dyck does a solo mission to rescue a bogged-down loader before joining his adopted Aggressive family for some off-roading fun.
194	12	"Good Ol' Crusty"	April 1, 2025
Jamie unveils his new railway wrecker to pull up a semi that's gone off Highway 1 in the mountains, Team Reliable's lead operator Andy tackles a gravel truck that's rolled off the shoulder of a logging road, MSA's youngest brother Gurk takes on the controls of the 50-ton for the first time for a foggy Fraser Valley recovery, and Al has to put in the sweat equity to pull a farmer's flipped dump truck out of the mud.

=== Season 14 (2026) ===
No. overall	No. in season	Title	Original release date
195	1	"Holy Grail"	January 20, 2026
Jamie debuts another heavy duty to his fleet as he and Co. work to recover a nearly intact semi on a snowbank. Autow has its hands full when dealing with an overturned excavator off a narrow backroad. John Dodds nearly has a close call as he deals with 2 stuck semis on Icy Highway 5A.
196	2	"Shift into Winter"	January 27, 2026
Al and Curtis battle the first snowstorm on the Coq, Reliable deals with a ditched semi that struck an ambulance up on the Coq, Mike from Ben's Towing deals with a semi blocking the only route through eastern BC, Autow deals with lumber off highway 97.
197	3	"Rubber Meets The Road"	February 3, 2026
Rob deals with a B-train that is in a ditch, Merv deals with an upside down trailer loaded with manure, Kirpal and Sim race to save a trailer sinking to the ground, and Jamie gets an unexpected visitor who's looking to work for him.
198	4	"Under Pressure"	February 10, 2026
Team MSA deals with a semi in the marsh off Hwy 1, Reliable fights to deal with a compromised semi on the Coq, Jamie uses his new railway wrecker dubbed Chromeo as he and Cary Quiring deal with a damaged cement truck, Kyle and Paul from Autow deal with a car down a steep bank.
199	5	"Better Call Al"	February 17, 2026
Rob from Autow deals with 2 jackknifed semis and then a secondary crash on Highway 97, Al Quiring teams up with former tow operator James Luke as he deals with an excavator in quagmire, Reliable’s Andy Collum and John Dodds deal with a jackknife on Icy Highway 3, Jamie’s new hire is put to the test to tow a 4-wheeler with a flat tire.
200	6	"Time is Money"	February 24, 2026
Reliable deals with a overturned sea can that’s at the worst possible spot, the entrance of a vital brake check, Al is maxed out when he deals with moving big heavy machinery from a garage, Merv deals with a excavator stuck in mud.
201	7	"Push, Pull, or Drag"	March 3, 2026
Jamie and crew deal with a disabled utility truck on a blind corner against fast and moving traffic outside of Hope, Ben’s Towing deal with a refrigerated semi that detached from its toppled trailer, John Dodds battles terrain as he deals with a camper near the river, tow companies in BC celebrate the holidays with a toy run.
202	8	"Smörgåsbord of Wreck"	March 10, 2026
A chain reaction crash caused by scattered lumber paralyzes all lanes of the Coq during a massive snowstorm, Merv deals with an upside down trailer loaded with farm equipment, Rob Barber deals with a mini van down in a steep ditch, Jamie and his daughter, Alexis, deal with a mailing truck and a steep slope.
203	9	"On the Razor's Edge"	March 17, 2026
Jas from Coquihalla towing uses his recently purchased wrecker Mighty Mo to deal with a semi rolled over in the steep ditch, Al uses his lighter dozer D-5 to move a semi stuck in the median off Highway 1, Merv deals with a Articulating Boom Lift on soft ground and threatening to collapse the drainage system, MSA deals with a burnt truck in a farm with terrain and surroundings impeding the recovery.
204	10	"You Just Need Some Old Iron"	March 24, 2026
Jas and Reliable deal with a sea can with a load of $250K meat, Merv races against the tide to rescue a sunken boat, Rob and Autow deal with a semi that lost a load of wood chips on a critical route, Maxime, Quen, and Mark deal with a compromised SUV down a rocky slope.
205	11	"Coming Undone"	March 31, 2026
Reliable deals with icy conditions on the Coq as they try to recover a compromised semi, Merv and Aggressive deal with a shifted load of big pipes causing a big time road hazard in Abbotsford, Snowshed protocol gets activated as a extreme snowstorm bears down on the Coq at the same time Kurtis does his last shift as Highway Maintenance Supervisor.
206	12	"Point of No Return"	April 7, 2026
Jamie debuts his new railway wrecker called “Hercules” as he and Jas do an airbag job to save the semi from tearing apart, Rob deals with a logging truck down in the wooded area off the Barkerville Highway, Andy Cullum takes the military rotator up a narrow and rocky off-road trail north of Mission to recover an ATV.
