= Heavy Rescue: 401 =

Canadian reality TV show

- Country of origin: Canada
- Original language: English
- No. of seasons: 7
- No. of episodes: 90

Production
- Production locations: Greater Toronto Area, Ontario, Canada; Sarnia, Ontario, Canada; Southern Ontario, Canada Cornwall, Ontario, Canada Eastern Ontario, Canada
- Running time: 43–44 minutes

Original release
- Network: Discovery Channel Canada (2016); The Weather Channel (2017)
- Release: October 10, 2016 – April 24, 2023

Related
- Highway Thru Hell

Heavy Rescue: 401 is a Canadian reality television show that follows the operations of multiple heavy vehicle rescue and recovery towing companies, as well as the Ontario Provincial Police (OPP), Ministry of Transportation of Ontario, and York Regional Police, based in the Greater Toronto Area (GTA) and the Southern Ontario region. The show focuses on the hardships of vehicle recovery along Ontario's Highway 401 and other 400-series highways, frequently in the Greater Toronto Area.

After the success of Highway Thru Hell, series creator Mark Miller developed a spinoff series titled Heavy Rescue: 401, which debuted on January 3, 2017, on Discovery Canada following the October 2016 pilot. The show is produced by Great Pacific Television, and executive produced by Kelly McClugan and Blair Reekie.

== Episodes ==
Season	Episodes	Originally released	
Season	Episodes	First released	Last released
1	9	October 10, 2016	February 28, 2017
2	10	January 2, 2018	March 6, 2018
3	14	January 8, 2019	April 9, 2019
4	14	January 7, 2020	April 7, 2020
5	17	January 5, 2021	April 27, 2021
6	13	January 24, 2022	April 18, 2022
7	13	January 23, 2023	April 24, 2023

=== Season 1 (2016-17) ===
No. overall	No. in season	Title	Original release date
1	1	"War Zone"	January 3, 2017
Sonny is tested when a 40-car pile-up turns a major highway into a war zone. Bear faces a fierce storm that's triggered a triple-semi crash. Preferred Towing races to clear the road. John jumps into speeding traffic to tackle an urgent job.
2	2	"Shock and Awe"	October 10, 2016
Pressure is on Kevin when a semi crash shuts down a crucial border route. Sonny helps out a stuck trucker. James and Bubba tackle a tanker wreck that has thrown the Toronto commute into chaos. Collin works to master a tough maneuver.
3	3	"All Around Us"	January 17, 2017
When a courier truck rolls over, James and Bubba battle a bursting trailer as they struggle to deliver the mail on time. A storm puts Mark in the middle of a crash zone on the 401. Crew has to dive for cover during an icy airbag job.
4	4	"Anything Can Happen"	January 24, 2017
When a semi smashes into a building, James and Bubba must recover it without bringing down the whole structure. Problems plague Kevin when a truck crashes in deep mud. Sonny fights traffic, and frustration, trying to answer an urgent call.
5	5	"A Load of Problems"	January 31, 2017
Gary's team fights to upright a battered trailer that risks splitting open. A rookie takes a shot as lead operator on the Rotator when a shipment flips on the 401. James runs out of options for removing a ripped semi from the highway.
6	6	"Honour Guard"	February 7, 2017
Kyle tackles a wreck and proving he can lead the team. Curious drivers create problems at the scene of a jackknife with Sonny. Ross' crew take on a job after a storm. Tragedy hits a nearby tow company, driving home the dangers of the job.
7	7	"Nerves of Steel"	February 14, 2017
A whiteout pile-up scatters heavy I-beams across the highway, testing James and his crew; Kevin must lift a 20,000-pound chunk of steel off the road.
8	8	"My Way or The Highway"	February 21, 2017
A surprise storm brings chaos to the city. Steve cleans up a spill blocking the 400. Sonny aims to keep an alternate route moving. John recovers a semi that went airborne. Gary gambles with a maneuver so big, his own crew can't believe it.
9	9	"Worlds Apart"	February 28, 2017
Worlds collide when Heavy Rescue veterans from Highway Thru Hell join the Heavy Rescue 401 crew to weigh in on the unique challenges of recovery operations in Ontario vs British Columbia, comparing the toughest wrecks of the past winter.

=== Season 2 (2018) ===
No. overall	No. in season	Title	Original release date
10	1	"It Only Takes A Second"	January 2, 2018
Steve's Towing fights to remove the wreckage of a dump truck embedded in an overpass. James Ireland faces a trailer threatening to cave in on his crew. A job in a thunderstorm turns into a crucial test for Collin.
11	2	"This is Chaos"	January 9, 2018
A freak storm unleashes a hundred-car pileup east of Toronto. Kevin fights a tough wreck after a trucker smashes into an orchard. A special police detail goes on a lifesaving mission. The Cornwall crew battles a stubborn jackknife.
12	3	"Guardian Angel"	January 16, 2018
The crew from Coxon's clear a big mess in a tight space. Mark Haslett heads to the rescue when a woman is trapped on a dangerous stretch of highway. Herb's Towing try to contain a load of beer ready to burst through the front of a trailer.
13	4	"Skyway Thru Hell"	January 23, 2018
A violent windstorm flips a tractor-trailer on an exposed bridge, challenging Kevin. Just to the north, James takes on a wind-battered wreck of his own. In Sarnia, a tanker rollover creates major challenges for every member of Gary's team.
14	5	"Where There's Smoke"	January 30, 2018
A tragic collision between two semis sends Bear and the crew from Ross' into the fray. Nate and Andrew have to improvise after a load of lumber rolls on the 401. Sonny acts fast when he spots a truck ready to burst into flames.
15	6	"Not Your Regular Fender-Bender"	February 6, 2018
A runaway van smashes through a wall and into the path of a full-speed truck. The crew from Herb's has to hurry to save a load of pharmaceuticals. A whiteout on the 400 leaves a smashed semi straddling a barrier.
16	7	"Feels Like A Win"	February 13, 2018
Gary works solo to open the continent's busiest border crossing. Brad, Eric and crew untangle a sedan badly crushed by a semi. A police constable works to prevent a disaster on the 401. A car plunges through the ice and into the river.
17	8	"A Very Long Night"	February 20, 2018
A storm sweeps across the province, sending heavy rescue crews scrambling. In Hamilton, Kevin fights to clear a wreck in time for the plows to get through. A massive pileup on the 401 pushes Herb's crew into a recovery marathon.
18	9	"Always A Danger"	February 27, 2018
A flipped truck blocks access to the airport. Coxon fights a wreck with a toxic payload. The Ross crew clear a trail of destruction. James works to clean up a dangerous spill. Sonny makes a big decision about his future in heavy recovery.
19	10	"Thrown in the Deep End"	March 6, 2018
A frustrating recovery threatens to overwhelm Kevin. After a big change in his career, Sonny struggles when a heavy load flips in the middle of the city. Gary and Collin work together to clear a rollover - for the first time ever.

=== Season 3 (2019) ===
No. overall	No. in season	Title	Original release date
20	1	"It's Now or Never and Pray for the Best"	January 8, 2019
During the first storm of the winter Sonny takes on a stubborn jackknife while just down the road - with snow plows bearing down -- John Allen wrestles a messy wreck under a low overpass. A big shakeup leads Bubba to a promotion but a heavy load threatens to take out his truck. And Collin gets a big surprise when he struggles to move up in heavy rescue.
21	2	"One Twisted Mess"	January 15, 2019
When a load of scrap metal explodes across the highway, Kevin must keep a team of heavy operators in perfect sync. A mammoth double wreck sends Gary's crew on a marathon recovery. Eric works to train the next generation of operators. The OPP chase down a potential disaster on the 401.
22	3	"The 401 is Calling"	January 22, 2019
The Sarnia crew battles exhaustion and frustration on a wreck that refuses to stop fighting. A badly-timed breakdown puts Eric on edge. Sonny works to free a fleet of plows trapped on the highway. And Andrew's newly rebuilt team attempts a complicated move on a very tight ramp.
23	4	"There's Gotta Be A Way"	January 29, 2019
Thick fog descends on the highway, turning a seemingly simple recovery into one of the most dangerous jobs of Gary's career; a mangled trailer forces the Ross crew to take a chance on a very unconventional maneuver.
24	5	"Only Getting Worse"	February 5, 2019
When a relentless whiteout attacks Highway 402, Gary's crew scrambles to keep the roads open. But when the storm forces a closure, the OPP race to aid stranded drivers. In Toronto John Allen fights the wind as he wrangles an unruly load high above the 401 while surrounded by moving traffic.
25	6	"Your Heart Sinks"	February 12, 2019
Herb's Towing turns a wreck on its head with some unexpected assistance; with traffic backing up for 50 kilometers, a fuel leak complicates an already stressful recovery for Steve and crew.
26	7	"Plan of Attack"	February 19, 2019
The Ross crew responds to an overturned wreck; the road to the boarder is shut down; John faces a steep ravine for a recovery.
27	8	"Ladies and Gents, We Are Going to War"	February 26, 2019
The crew from Herb's faces a night of non-stop recoveries when a blizzard hits; a veteran fights the toughest battle of his career at a multi-semi pileup.
28	9	"Whole Lot of Faith"	March 5, 2019
The crew responds to a wreck scene that stretches over half a kilometre.
29	10	"There is Nothing Else"	March 12, 2019
Gary and the team tackle a tanker wreck; Steve's crew fights to get a tall tractor off the highway.
30	11	"Only One Shot"	March 19, 2019
When a bridge collapses in a river, it's up to the Ross crew to execute the biggest, most complex job of the season - with an entire town turning up to watch. And one of North America's youngest rotator operators gets in over his head.
31	12	"We're Not Safe Here"	March 26, 2019
Collin is stuck right in the middle when icy roads send trucks smashing into the ditch. Later, his first shot at a solo heavy recovery holds a nasty surprise. And Bubba scrambles to fight a fuel leak and a buckling trailer.
32	13	"Between Life and Death"	April 2, 2019
Andrew's sister joins the crew for her first recovery; Eric attempts to keep his crew safe; Collin's once-in-a-lifetime job goes wrong.
33	14	"Beat Up and Bloody"	April 9, 2019
When a springtime ice storm attacks the 400, Bubba battles his most stubborn wreck. Sonny improvises to clear a pile of heavy steel beams. Still reeling from Collin's recent close call, Gary has to put second thoughts aside when a flammable tanker plummets from an on-ramp.

=== Season 4 (2020) ===
No. overall	No. in season	Title	Original release date
34	1	"We're Jumping In"	January 7, 2020
After three decades on the highway, a major change forces Eric Godard to adapt to a new crew on a tough rollover; a vicious pre-winter storm pushes Sonny into urgent on-the-job training; a jet fuel spill shuts down the entire 401.
35	2	"Take A Deep Breath"	January 14, 2020
When a tanker bursts open east of Toronto, a young operator faces a toxic mess; Gary reacts fast when he spots a dangerous mistake on the road; a rookie takes the controls for his first heavy job.
36	3	"There's Always Fear"	January 21, 2020
Steve's crew battles a fiery wreck in the heart of Toronto; the OPP takes to the air to keep the roads safe; when freezing rain ices up the highway around London, a newly-promoted rotator operator gets his first big test.
37	4	"Not the Best Spot to Be"	January 28, 2020
A pileup on the 401 brings traffic to a standstill and pushes the Ross crew into action; Sonny helps a driver stuck on a dangerous stretch of highway in Toronto; Herb's rookie Zach masters a difficult move for the first time.
38	5	"Free the Highway"	February 4, 2020
A 70-vehicle whiteout crash shuts down Highway 400 and the OPP jumps to organize an army of recovery crews; the Sarnia team struggles to recover a severely damaged trailer without losing the load.
39	6	"Pull 'n Pray"	February 11, 2020
Eric is still working to find his place on the new County/Coxon team when a T-bone semi collision spurs them into action; with his first baby on the way, a blizzard in the east sends Andrew on an urgent rescue mission.
40	7	"A Big Problem"	February 18, 2020
An air ambulance crew takes off after a pileup results in serious casualties; when a low bridge knocks over an industrial payload, Steve and crew battle their way through a sandstorm.
41	8	"Holy Mackerel, What A Mess"	February 25, 2020
After a triple crash, the crew from Chatham struggles to keep a mangled truck in one piece; a complicated air cushion job tests a new rotator operator; the new heavy crew at Metro gets a bad case of déjà vu.
42	9	"That Highway Is The Lifeline"	March 3, 2020
Herb's team fights fire while tussling with a burned-out semi; as whiteouts rage across the 402 in Sarnia, Mark fights his way through a long backup to reach a job; a unique recovery crew faces a heavy load of peat moss and trailer ready to split.
43	10	"A Real Disaster"	March 10, 2020
With his dad away, Mitch works with his older brother to get a stubborn wreck onto the road, but these brothers rarely see eye-to-eye; Glen, Todd and the crew improvise to offload some extreme cargo.
44	11	"I've Seen My Share"	March 17, 2020
When a rolled-over dump truck spills its load on the 401 in the middle of rush hour, Steve, Sonny and crew must make a split-second decision; Eric and his boss disagree on how to handle a shredded trailer.
45	12	"You Are Never Safe"	March 24, 2020
Snow squalls attack Highway 402, sending Gary, Collin and Mark to work deep in the trees; a fuel tanker rolls next to rail lines in Toronto's industrial port lands; the Chatham crew improvises against a fire-ravaged wreck.
46	13	"Always Makes My Knees Knock"	March 31, 2020
Mitch's new partnership with his brother is put to the test in the aftermath of a brutal storm; Eric, Derek and crew take on a load of steel pipes, threatening to spring loose on the road; Andrew and his team wrestle difficult cargo.
47	14	"It's A Rush Every Time"	April 7, 2020
Gary's crew and family come together for a multi-wreck scene blocking the border; low power lines and a bad fuel leak complicate a delicate recovery in Toronto; a garbage hauler creates a heavy mess for the Ross crew.

=== Season 5 (2021) ===
No. overall	No. in season	Title	Original release date
48	1	"Big, Mean and Heavy"	January 5, 2021
A load of lumber spills across the 401 in the heart of Toronto, sending John Allen into the first storm of the season. After an injury on the job, Gary must lean on Collin for a heavy and delicate recovery. Meanwhile, Sonny makes a major change in his life and career.
49	2	"The Worst Place"	January 12, 2021
The OPP must manage a chaotic scene after a thirty-vehicle pileup shuts down the 401; Mitch sets a tight deadline in his first job as leader of the heavy crew; a semi smashes into a culvert, the Ross's try out their newest operator.
50	3	"Everything That Can Go Wrong"	January 19, 2021
Sonny and his new boss face their first heavy test, fighting a semi frozen hard into the mud; a double collision brings border traffic to a halt in Sarnia, forcing Gary and crew to wrangle a difficult load of cargo.
51	4	"A Hell of a Pull"	January 26, 2021
A rolled-over load of scrap metal defies gravity and Kevin's patience; the Cornwall crew rides to the rescue of a fire truck; County Towing struggles to get a grip on an icy highway.
52	5	"I'm On My Way"	February 2, 2021
The OPP responds to a tragedy that rocks the towing community; when Sonny gets caught on a dangerous stretch of road, he must turn to an unexpected source for help; a truckload of confetti shreds Mitch's nerves.
53	6	"No Room For Error"	February 9, 2021
A compromised trailer breaks apart in Chatham; John Allen maneuvers a truckload of water.
54	7	"Thread the Needle"	February 16, 2021
A tractor wedged between an overpass and a guardrail forces the Ross crew into a game of inches; Herb's crew goes deep into the woods to rescue a tree-bound truck; Sonny tries to clear a stalled semi in a dangerous spot.
55	8	"This Ain't Gonna Be Pretty"	February 23, 2021
A massive storm across the southern tip of the province pushes the County crew into an intense double recovery; a tree stump in the worst possible spot threatens a big job for Duncan.
56	9	"Moment of Truth"	March 2, 2021
Mitch from B&G joins forces with John Allen to clean up a triple collision and a badly leaking tanker; a newly promoted rotator op fights a trailer that's ripping in two; Kevin rushes to clear a wreck in time for an important family milestone.
57	10	"I Don't Stop"	March 9, 2021
A tractor-trailer rolls over in an icy median; the oldest member of Duncan's team takes on the most dangerous job; a fiery wreck in Toronto turns Steve's crew into a pit crew; swapping wheels in a race against rush hour.
58	11	"No Other Choice"	March 16, 2021
A massive super-storm blasts across the province; Sonny rushes into action to help a stranded customer.
59	12	"Recipe For Disaster"	March 23, 2021
When the Classic and Lucky crews battle a trailer ready to break in two, they make a drastic decision, turning to their tree expert and his chainsaw; Mike and David Ross ease out a semi caught between a culvert and a heavy steel coil.
60	13	"In For The Long Haul"	March 30, 2021
John Allen finds himself in need of a heavy rescue when he gets stuck on an icy side road; a rotator operator takes on a tough challenge when he tries to save a trailer buckling under heavy concrete; a new member joins the Preferred crew.
61	14	"For Some Reason, I Like It"	April 6, 2021
Racing to prevent a fuel spill, Mitch must execute a complex manoeuvre he's never tried before; Adam attempts to help out a group of drivers stranded on a dangerous hill; when James Ireland faces a tough wreck, he turns to his wife, Fabiana.
62	15	"Slay the Dragon"	April 13, 2021
Adam improvises when heavy winds complicate a tough recovery; Gary's new team and hopes are put to the test against a heavy sea container; when a trailer loses its wheels, Duncan has to wrestle it to the road.
63	16	"It's "Right Now" Time"	April 20, 2021
With Herb watching over the crew, Zach shakes off his nerves and pulls off a tough move; after a bad crash, the Chatham crew clears the road while preserving a tractor for the police investigation; the Rosses do battle on double fronts.
64	17	"A Major Situation"	April 27, 2021
When Sonny needs to pull off an urgent recovery, he turns to an unexpected source for help; a tight recovery puts Duncan right up against a live lane of traffic; Gary's crew takes on the last big rollover of the winter.

=== Season 6 (2022) ===
No. overall	No. in season	Title	Original release date
65	1	"When They Need Help, I'll Be There"	January 24, 2022
The first storm of the season forces OPP Sgt. Kerry Schmidt to take hands-on action; Collin leads the crew to recover a tanker with a highly toxic payload; the Ross crew faces a trailer on its head that demands a double roll to wrangle it upright.
66	2	"Wreck And A Half"	January 31, 2022
Bill Wright and his son need to become a tight team on a remote job; a city-based crew heads north to fight a demolished tractor-trailer in rugged terrain; Kevin feels the pressure when a load of steel smashes onto the highway right before rush hour.
67	3	"A Real Logjam"	February 7, 2022
Investigators race to find crucial evidence in the wake of a devastating crash; an unexpected malfunction puts Collin directly in the line of fire.
68	4	"Scared As Hell"	February 14, 2022
Todd tests his skill against a truck crashed up a steep slope; Bill Wright must learn to trust his son as they struggle against a swampy wreck; a frustrating job rattles Duncan while a key member of his team fights to return from a serious injury.
69	5	"A Whole Lot Of Kaboom"	February 21, 2022
An overpass jackknife pushes Bill Wright into quick action; Collin's first heavy job after a close call forces him to put his father's new safety plan to the test.
70	6	"This Is Crazy"	February 28, 2022
An Eastern Ontario crew works to untangle a truck from a thick stand of trees; Mike Ross and Austin battle a trailer ready to burst; Andrew's crew faces a tragic job after losing a key member of their team.
71	7	"Not A Warm Fuzzy Feeling"	March 7, 2022
A tanker full of wine rolls and spills on the 401; Mike McPhee takes his first step back toward the highway after a potentially career-ending accident; Eric and the crew work to save an excavator from the edge of Lake Erie.
72	8	"A "Hail Mary" Move"	March 14, 2022
A storm slams into Toronto and Kerry takes cleanup into his own hands; Bill Wright is forced to pull off an impossible move; when a truck smashes through an overturned semi, John Campbell has to improvise with the tools at hand.
73	9	"Become One With The Truck"	March 21, 2022
Duncan takes on a difficult wreck as Mike McPhee returns from the injured list; a load of liquid asphalt threatens to spread.
74	10	"Get Back Up"	March 28, 2022
Bill Wright must perform a complicated rescue; Kevin leaves his home base to work a recovery in the big city; Gary and Collin fight a dumped load of giant boulders; Mitch reveals a tough personal struggle.
75	11	"We’re In Trouble Here Now"	April 4, 2022
Duncan helps an industry veteran take on a heavy rollover in a marathon job that delivers one problem after another.
76	12	"What We Live For"	April 11, 2022
Heavy squalls launch a surprise attack on the Ross crew; Sonny handles huge rolls of paper that threaten to tear through a trailer; Eric faces the end of the winter with a muddy battle and a major decision about how much more heavy recovery his battered body can stand.
77	13	"You Wanna Fight?"	April 18, 2022
When winter mounts an unexpected comeback, John Allen spends a night battling spilled scrap metal; Collin faces a tight deadline on a tough double recovery; Bill Wright makes a hard call, leading to an emotional farewell.

=== Season 7 (2023) ===
No. overall	No. in season	Title	Original release date
78	1	"Oh Boy, What A Mess"	January 23, 2023
A double tanker loaded with gasoline smashes into a house; Duncan Cooper puts his new 50-ton rotator to the test; Gary and Collin bring their rookie crew to a bad collision blocking the road to the border.
79	2	"Snow Screws Everything Up"	January 30, 2023
Sgt. Kerry Schmidt fights to get stuck commuters moving; Austin Hutchinson is forced to battle a nasty wreck all on his own; Abrams' John Allen tackles a snowplow blocking a vital ramp.
80	3	"No Time Like The Present"	February 6, 2023
Sgt. Kerry Schmidt coordinates heavy tows and Sonny Subra must clear a ramp littered with semis; Herb's Towing takes on a B-train that slid right off the highway; Eric Goddard brings a brand-new heavy wrecker to recover a heavy trailer.
81	4	"All Hands On Deck"	February 13, 2023
An armored truck with a valuable payload rolls over on the 401. Kim Reid's crew deals with a toppled trailer in a very risky spot. Ross Services handles a tanker full of gasoline.
82	5	"A Lump In The Throat"	February 20, 2023
As a mix of snow and freezing rain hits the roads, Chad Grenier deals with a spun-out tractor. Bill Wright brings his new rotator to a dangerous corner of the 401. When a semi barrels across both sides of the highway, the Herb's Towing crew faces a major challenge.
83	6	"Way Worse Than A Jackknife"	February 27, 2023
A heavy crew must remove a load of industrial glass panels from a buckled trailer. A double wreck pushes the crews from Herb's and Cornwall into a tense race. And Gary gives a rookie operator the chance to learn the ropes at a scene.
84	7	"No Coming Back"	March 6, 2023
As a massive weather front hammers the western edge of Ontario, Eric and Senior work to coax a semi back on the road. With multiple wrecks across the eastern 401, Kim Reid leads her team into a day-long battle.
85	8	"Take Your Time But Hurry Up"	March 13, 2023
High winds wreak havoc on the Burlington Skyway west of Toronto. When a transport rolls on a dangerous curve, John Campbell needs to master his new rotator in a hurry. Duncan Cooper and crew take on a full load of medical supplies.
86	9	"Metal Twisted Upon Metal"	March 20, 2023
Toronto drivers struggle after a heavy winter storm. North of the city, Sonny pushes his small wrecker to its limit. A load of buttermilk spurs a messy cleanup. And the newest member of Andrew's crew gets to prove her worth against a badly mangled wreck.
87	10	"Running On Adrenaline"	April 3, 2023
When a load of wood beams goes for a wild ride, Herb takes a break from retirement to help the crew wrangle a huge and heavy job. An OPP constable makes a very unusual traffic stop in Toronto. And the Preferred team confronts a challenge that even Gary has never seen before - a fully loaded car carrier overturned in the median.
88	11	"Out Of The Comfort Zone"	April 10, 2023
The Preferred crew must split up to clear two wrecks. But Gary is soon desperate to have Collin back at his side. Mitch Wright returns home just in time to pick up a shovel and lead a frustrating recovery against a dump truck filled with manure.
89	12	"Nature Of The Beast"	April 17, 2023
Another snowstorm hits Toronto as Sgt. Kerry Schmidt works with Abram's crew to clear the continent's busiest stretch of highway. Duncan teams with John Campbell on a semi mired deep in the mud. Ross' Mike and Austin attempt to recover a trailer carrying an unusual load. And when a fire closes down Highway 400, James and Fabiana answer the call.
90	13	"Deep, Steep And Stuck"	April 24, 2023
Outside Toronto, a bad jackknife makes a mess of the morning commute. Sonny needs to clear a spun-out semi in time to make an important family commitment. After a transport veers off the highway, Eric faces a hard truth about the future of his career. And Andrew's crew must overcome intense resistance from a truck frozen deep in the ditch.
