= Bribe, Inc. =

Bribe, Inc. is an Emmy-nominated documentary film that examines the Unaoil bribery scandal, centered on Unaoil, a Monaco-based firm founded by Iranian expatriate Ata Ahsani and later run by his sons, Cyrus and Saman Ahsani. According to the film, the company conducted an "industrial scale bribery operation" on behalf of large corporations seeking government contracts in oil-rich nations. The film was directed by Peter W. Klein.

== Synopsis ==
The film follows Australian investigative journalist Nick McKenzie, who was contacted by an anonymous whistleblower codenamed "Figaro." McKenzie worked with Figaro to analyze a trove of leaked documents, ultimately determining the extent of the company's alleged bribery.

"Figaro" is the pseudonym used for a former Unaoil employee who provided McKenzie with a large cache of internal emails. The whistleblower's identity is disguised in the film, and his voice is replaced by that of actor William B. Davis.

Drawing on more than 317,000 leaked files, McKenzie and Figaro traced a money trail spanning Iraq, Monaco, Rome, London, Australia, and the United States. The film states that Unaoil paid multi-million-dollar bribes connected to major companies operating across Europe, North America, and Australia.

The documentary also follows Serious Fraud Office prosecutor Tom Martin, who investigated Unaoil. The film marks the first time Martin, who was dismissed amid disputed circumstances following his pursuit of the Unaoil case and later found to have been unfairly dismissed, has spoken publicly about it. The film also reports that, following his arrest, one member of the Ahsani family was permitted a single phone call, which he made to an FBI agent.

Anti-corruption activist Alexandra Wrage also appears in the film. Wrage, founder of the nonprofit TRACE International, had previously awarded Unaoil a compliance "Seal of Approval," and expresses frustration in the film that her organization's work was used to lend the company an appearance of legitimacy.

== Reception ==
The film had its festival premier at the Beverly Hills Film festival, and its broadcast premiere on the Australian streamer Stan. and has received positive reviews. Variety called the film's revelations “explosive.” Daily Mail said the documentary is the “greatest exposé of bribery and corruption in modern history.” The Guardian described it as “filled with the kind of cloak-and-dagger developments one associates with potboilers and airport novels – clandestine meetings, coded emails and secret-filled hard drives.” The documentary was nominated for the 2026 Emmy Award for Best Business Documentary
