= Highway Thru Hell =

Canadian documentary series

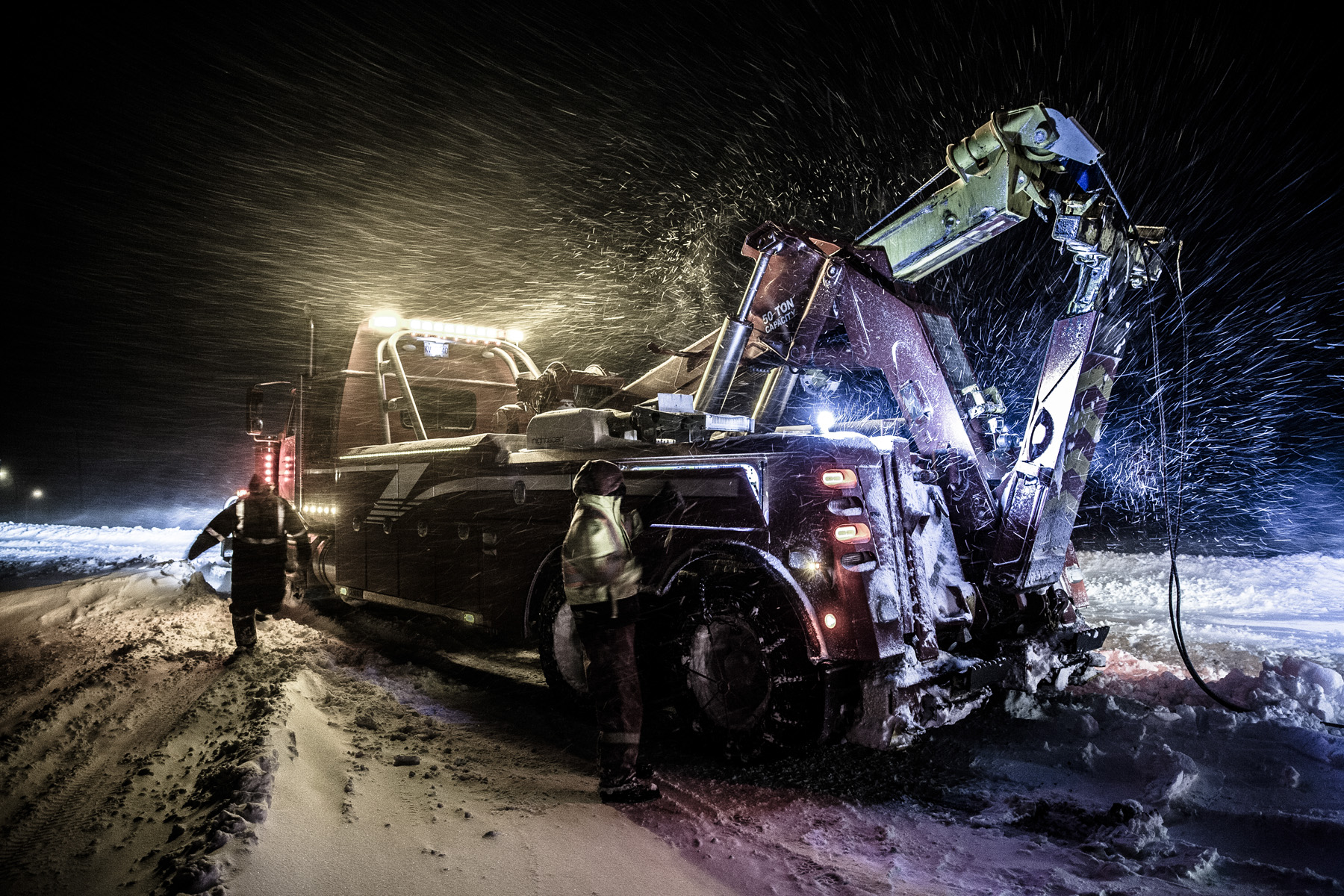
- Heavy wrecker
- Genre: Documentary; Reality
- Created by: Mark A. Miller, Kevin Mills, and Neil Thomas Great Pacific Television
- Starring: Jamie Davis; Colin McLean; Cam Neno; Al Quiring; Gord Boyd; Cary Quiring; Jason Davis; Chris Mervyn; Ken Duperon; Dylan Greenwood; James Luke; Mitch Karr; Evan Pardy; Jace Summers; Andy Cullum; Aj Case; Ty Kennedy; John Dods; Scott Bird; Kelly Davis; Bruce Hardy; Brandon Kodallas; John Rogers; Ken Monkhouse; Jordie Duperon; Ritchie Hawkins; Nick Duperon; Wally Duperon
- Narrated by: David Pettitt
- Composers: Mark A. Miller and Paul Airey
- Country of origin: Canada
- Original language: English
- No. of seasons: 14
- No. of episodes: 206 (list of episodes)

Production
- Production locations: Hope, British Columbia, Canada; Aldergrove, British Columbia, Canada; Merritt, British Columbia, Canada; Lac La Biche, Alberta, Canada
- Running time: 43–44 minutes
- Production companies: Great Pacific Media (seasons 1–14); Blue Ant Studios (seasons 15–)

Original release
- Network: USA Network (Canadian TV channel) (January 2025-present); Discovery Channel Canada (September 2012-January 2024); Discovery Channel (Spring 2012-October 2013); The Weather Channel (October 2013-April 2024); National Geographic (2012-present); National Geographic Channel (UK and Ireland) (2013-present); TV3 (New Zealand) (2015-present); ABC2 (2016-present); National Geographic Channel (Scandinavia) (2013-present)
- Release: September 4, 2012 – present

Related
- Heavy Rescue: 401

Highway Thru Hell is a Canadian documentary television series that follows the operations of Jamie Davis Motor Truck & Auto Ltd., a heavy vehicle rescue and recovery towing company based in Hope, British Columbia. Quiring Towing, Aggressive Towing, MSA Towing, Mission Towing and Reliable Towing are also featured in the series. The show focuses on the hardships of operating along the highways of the BC Interior, especially the Coquihalla Highway (Coq).

== Episodes ==
Season	Episodes	Originally released	
Season	Episodes	First released	Last released
1	10	September 4, 2012	December 25, 2012
2	13	September 3, 2013	November 19, 2013
3	13	September 2, 2014	November 25, 2014
4	13	September 8, 2015	December 1, 2015
5	13	September 13, 2016	December 6, 2016
6	14	September 5, 2017	December 4, 2017
7	17	September 4, 2018	December 25, 2018
8	17	October 7, 2019	January 27, 2020
9	18	September 14, 2020	January 11, 2021
10	18	September 6, 2021	January 17, 2022
11	18	September 26, 2022	January 9, 2023
12	18	August 21, 2023	January 29, 2024
13	12	January 14, 2025	April 1, 2025
14	12	January 20, 2026	April 7, 2026

== Production ==
Highway Thru Hell was created by Mark A. Miller, Kevin Mills, and Neil Thomas. Thomas met one of the heavy rescue operators for Jamie Davis Motor Truck & Auto after Thomas' moving truck broke down on Highway 5 in the summer of 2010. In the early winter of 2011, cameraman Mills and executive producer Miller dropped in on Davis' company while passing through Hope. The idea of a show about heavy recovery was discussed. The winter of 2010–2011 had been a record-setting season for Davis' business, and he expressed a desire to change the public's perceptions about his industry.

In his review of High Arctic Haulers, another reality-TV series produced by Great Pacific Media, Jim Bell of Nunatsiaq News described the formula used by this and similar shows: "Rugged teams of blue-collar heroes, mostly male, struggle against bad weather, bad luck and other hardships to transport the necessities of life ..."

Highway Thru Hell debuted on Canada's Discovery Channel on Tuesday, September 4, 2012. Steep hills, lethal drop-offs, killer rockslides, and the worst weather in a decade captivated audiences, resulting in the most-watched series premiere in the channel's history.

The second season premiered on September 3, 2013, and included 13 new episodes, as well as four re-edited Season 1 episodes featuring new content, factoids, and viewer tweets.

After Season 2, competition in the Hope area became more intense, causing Davis to seek out new territory, and expand his business (and fleet) along Alberta Highway 63. In Season 3, Davis is seen dealing with the stresses of business expansion, especially as senior drivers step into managerial roles in his absence, and sometimes leave chaos in their wake. As an active avalanche season occurs on the Coquihalla, the issue of post-traumatic stress disorder is tackled by the series, as some drivers encounter difficult situations. Al Quiring's family business, Quiring Towing, is featured more prominently in this season.

Filming for Season 4 took place in British Columbia and Alberta during the winter of 2014–2015, when the days-long Hope Ice Storm occurred. Davis' company is split into two "camps", and he sometimes calls in his brother's company, Aggressive Towing, for backup. Mission Towing, a family business including generations of tow-operators, headquartered in British Columbia's Fraser Valley, is first featured in this season.

Season 5 kicked off on September 13, 2016, with an episode depicting a teary-eyed Davis selling his beloved rotator. Quiring Towing tackles some difficult excavator recoveries in British Columbia's nasty peat bog, and Davis' crew suffers some near-misses.

In Season 6, Davis closes his company's Alberta offices, shrinking his operation to Hope and Chilliwack, British Columbia. In an effort to make his business more lean, Davis begins buying and restoring older equipment to add to his fleet, such as a vintage 22-ton Holmes Python wrecker.

Season 7 began airing on September 4, 2018. At Davis' yard in Hope, classic Holmes tow trucks – some nearly half a century old – are replacing newer, costlier wreckers. For Davis, the vintage trucks are more than just a passion; they represent survival. Under pressure to reduce costs and stay competitive, Davis is confident he and his crew can tackle some of the toughest jobs – on and off the Coquihalla – using an older, rebuilt fleet. Colin McLean is back in Hope as lead driver, but since he has driven some top-of-the-line hydraulic trucks, Davis' "old iron" takes some getting used to. The seventh season sees some of the younger generation stepping up, with Cary Quiring one of the first to respond to a mass-casualty event on the Coquihalla, and Dylan Greenwood of Mission Towing taking the lead on some big wrecks and recoveries in the Fraser Valley. Reliable Towing, out of Merritt, makes its debut in the second half of Season 7, first responding to a small wreck of a truck and trailer with pigs inside, and then to a six-semitrailer crash on the Coquihalla, north of Merritt. Mudslides and rockslides contribute to a tough time for recovery crews all around. The season ends with a tearful goodbye as Davis sells HR 116 to Reliable which adds the truck to their Mission fleet.

Season 8 opens with the winter of 2019 and the Hope Mudslide which almost destroys Davis' yard and buries The Coq in 20 feet of mud cutting off access to Merritt and Abbotsford. Davis buys a new Mack Anthem and dubs it HR 127 to close out the season.

Season 9 begins with Davis hiring Greg to drive HR 127 and marks the return of TR 37 to service which was under repairs in Davis' shop at the end of Season 7 to get a new motor. The season ends with the return of Colin and the passing of Ken Monkhouse who died in May 2020. Davis tries to get Colin back by ordering HR 130 but ends up selling HR 126 to pay for the truck. Quiring Towing is profiled as Quiring shows us his hobby of recovering and restoring old bulldozers and excavators and several recoveries featuring Quiring using his dozers to recover wrecks and trapped machinery from the peat bogs following the landslides.

Season 10 opens with Davis buying Columbia Towing and acquiring some of his former trucks back which he sold to them at the end of Season 3 when he closed Alberta and opening a new yard in Golden. Davis also gets Brandon back who now works for a flagging crew out of Golden. Mission is forced to bring out all their trucks and even ask for help when a logging truck goes over the edge. Jr. joins the Davis crew as a swamper and Davis announces his projects for the year. The COVID-19 pandemic forces Davis to lean back his operation as mandates go into effect. The Season ends with Davis teaming up with Aggressive to recover a truck that went over the edge, Davis in Ely, Nevada buying one of his project trucks and a used boom for 47, and Davis in LA buying HR 56 from the LA Fire Department and adding it to his fleet. The Rotator is also profiled recovering two wrecks after its arrival from LA, a lumber truck that went off the road in the same spot another one did in Season 6, a logging truck that went over the edge in Fraser Canyon, and a tanker which almost causes a chemical spill. Davis also reminisces on 10 years of Highway Thru Hell on the air.

Season 11 opens with another mudslide in Hope which threatens to take out Davis' yard, Davis Towing acquires several new trucks some of which appeared on Ice Road Truckers and other shows, The Coq is rebuilt so Davis can help with the cleanup, Davis says goodbye to some of his fleet after HR 127 is lost in a fire and COVID forces him to make selloffs to pay Miller for replacements to keep his fleet running, and an old warhorse returns to the Coq while Jr. profiles his projects with Davis working on some of his own.

Season 12 opens with disaster. Rotator is run off the road and suffers a bad crash, FD 124 suffers a rollover and is totaled, Jamie's Mack Anthem 127 is torched, and Jamie is forced to sell HR 85 and the General as collateral to pay for a new truck. The season ends with the arrival of HR 100 and MR 134 who will fill in for Rotator and 47 and the cast of Highway Thru Hell says farewell as the series announces the death of Al's mother and father.

Season 13 opens with Jamie training his children producer Brianna, her twin sister Alexis, AJ, and Junior how to do recoveries which involved using airbags, heavy straps, and chains on four recoveries. Some of those recoveries involve Jamie going off road and he even takes the snowcat up into the hills. Midway through the season while on a long haul tow Jamie goes back to where it all happened in Season 12 when Rotator was run off the road and suffered a bad crash. Dealing with the PTSD from it Jamie suffers a breakdown and has to get HR 100 fixed so he can finish his tow up. Near the end of the season Jamie reveals two new wreckers to his fleet and an old legend returns to the Coq. HR 50 is back good as new just as the day when Bruce turned it off for the last time. Jamie also reveals upcoming projects which will be shown later on his YouTube channel and in upcoming episodes of the coming season.

== International broadcast ==
- National Geographic Channel began airing the show on its American and Scandinavian channels in spring 2013, and has also aired the first two seasons on its British and Irish channel.
- The Weather Channel broadcast the show in the United States as well, beginning in October 2013. Seasons 13 & 14 will air starting January 10, 2027. It last aired new episodes in April 2024 for season 12.
- TV3 screened the first season in New Zealand in 2015.
- Season 1 was also shown in France on RMC Découverte in 2015.
- Australia's ABC2 screened the first three seasons in 2016.
- ProSieben Maxx has been broadcasting the show in Germany, under the title Highway Heroes Canada, since March 2015.
- In Iran, the show is broadcast on IRIB Mostanad.
- Seasons 1 through 5 were available in some territories on Netflix by January 2017. By January 2020, the series was no longer available on the platform.
- In Poland, Fokus TV and Telewizja Polsat broadcast this series under Polish title "Autostrada przez Piekło"

== Fleets ==
=== Jamie Davis Motor Truck fleet ===
Jamie Davis Hope Yard

- HR - 2026 Western Star 49X, Vulcan V100; (50 Ton Wrecker) (Being assembled at NATTS)
- HR 130 - 2026 Kenworth T880, Century 5230; (30 Ton Wrecker)
- 144 - 2025 Freightliner M2 106 Plus Extended Cab, Century 12 Series 22′ LCG Carrier (6 Ton)
- 142 - 2025 Freightliner M2 106 Plus Extended Cab, Century 12 Series 22′ LCG Carrier (6 Ton)
- HR 56 – 1995 Peterbilt 377 Century 1040; (40 ton Rotator) Rebuild 2026 after major accident
- HR 140 - 1994 Peterbilt 379 Holmes DTU; (35 Ton)
- 41 - 1972 Chevrolet Silverado C30 Holmes 500; (10 Ton)
- 42 - Chevrolet Silverado C30 Holmes H475T; (6 T)
- 43 - GMC 7000, 2023 Jerr Dan Deck ( 2026 painted red to match fleet)
- 127 - Kenworth T800 tri-drive tractor (ex Heidelberg/ ocean cement)
- TR 96 – 1996 Kenworth (Still owned?)
- low bed trailer
- RC 130 "Old Crusty"- 1982 Freightliner Anderson Classic with Isringhausen Works 125 ton crane; Road/rail unit

63011 Flood Hope Rd, Hope Yard

- 7 - Green GMC 3500 Wrecker Holmes 480 (8 Ton) (Ex Discount Towing)
- - Red / Yellow GMC, Holmes 1100 Trooper
- Coastline 44 – 1985 Chevrolet 30 Scottsdale, Holmes 480 Twin Line (8 Ton), (Originally had a Holmes 440 (4 Ton), bought season 2 on Highway Thru Hell)
- Coastline 50 – 1985 Western Star Holmes 750 (25 Ton)
- HU 88 - 1995 Freightliner FLT cabover fire truck; replaced R 120. Transports airbags and compressor.
- LR 92 - 2023/2024 Ford F550 XLT, Chevron 408 (8 Ton Wrecker)
- RC 140 "Chromeo"- 1983 Krenshaw 130 ton crane; Road/ rail units
- RC 150 " Hercules"- 1994 Freightliner FTL with 150 ton Industrial Works crane; Road/ rail unit

Langley Location

- 129 – 2017 Chevrolet 3500 HD Crew Cab, Century 411 (4 Ton) Wrecker (wrecker off a old JDT 1 Ton)
- 138 - 2024 Ford F550 XLT, Century 10 Series 19' Deck Truck (5 Ton)
- 139 - 2026? Ford F600 XL, Jerr Dan Deck Truck (5 Ton)
- 131 - 202? Toyota Prius, Booster Car

Golden Yard

- HR 100 1988 Peterbilt 377 Century 1050 (50 Ton Wrecker), purchased 2023
- 136 - 2024 Western Star 47X, Century 15 Series LCG 30' Flat Deck (15 Ton)
- TR 132 - 2005 Freightliner Coronado (Day Cab) with Landoll trailer (bought from Central Valley Towing in 2022)
- TR 133 - Peterbilt 377 Green Tractor (Ex Aggressive Towing, Day Cab)
- 128 - 2020 ? Ford F-150 XLT Crew Cab Pick Up

Coastline Trucks

- TR 37 (TR 06) – 1974 Peterbilt 359 Tractor (2nd ever wrecker for JDT, originally had a Holmes 750 on it)
- Coastline 44 – 1985 Chevrolet 30 Scottsdale, Holmes 480 Twin Line (8 Ton), (Originally had a Holmes 440 (4 Ton), bought season 2 on Highway Thru Hell)
- Coastline 50 – 1985 Western Star Holmes 750 (25 Ton

Out of Service (Project List)

- 47 – 1979 GMC 7000, Holmes 500 (10 ton) (awaiting upgrade to Holmes 600)
- TR 52 "007" – Kenworth Tractor (blown engine, supposed to be stretched and receive a 1701)
- Holmes 1601 Python (22 Ton) (Chassis scrapped, rebuilding onto Peterbilt chassis, unknown completion)
- Holmes 1625 Legend (25 Ton) (Chassis scrapped, in storage, bought to mount on HR 50, status unknown)
- ? – Yellow GMC currently tandem axle gas engine
- ? – Old Yeller Holmes 750
- James Jr. Projects
- ? – 1990 Chevy Silverado with AATAC body (Jr.'s project truck, to be mounted onto a Ford F350 XLT, will be assigned to Hope Fleet)
- ? – 1998 Ford F350 XLT crew cab (new chassis for Jr.'s project truck, see above)

==== Jamie's Former Fleet ====
- HR 5 - 1980 5 Star GMC General, Century 820 (20 Ton) (Chassis scrapped, wrecker sold by wrecker dealer)
- 41 - GMC 3500 Deck winch and under lift (White w/ Blue Stripe bought for Brandon)
- 44 - 2006 Chevrolet C7500, 23' Century 16 Series (10 Ton) Flat Deck (Originally Steve's Towing, was for sale in 2025 at Commercial Truck)
- FD 45 - 2009 Hino flat deck (In Surrey)
- FD 54 - 2011 Freightliner Flat Deck (2016 sold to Nanoose Towing, Former Ken Monhouse truck)
- Coastline 46 – 2000 Peterbilt 379 Holmes DTU (16 Ton) (Sold to Operator in Manitoba)
- Coastline 48 – 2019 Ford F550 XLT, 19' Century 10 Series Flat Deck (5 Ton) (sold Feb 2023, Owner unknown?)
- Coastline 49 - 2022 Ford F550, Jerr Dan self-loader (8 Ton) (sold Feb 2023, Owner Clover Towing)
- 48 - GMC Sierra, Holmes 480 (8 Ton) (Bought for Bruce Hardy to downsize, ex Tom Merritt Towing)
- HR 50 – 1992 Peterbilt 379 Holmes 750; 16 Ton, Bruce "Crazy Horse" Hardy's Former Truck (Rebuilt with DTU 25 Ton) (Sold to Barriere Towing)
- Coastline 51 - ? Freightliner M2 106, 23' Century 16 Series (8 Ton) Flat Deck, (Sold 2019 to Logan Lake Towing)
- Coastline 51 – 2018 Freightliner M2 106 Extended Cab, 23' Century 16 Series (8 Ton) Flat Deck (Traded in Commercial Truck Co., sold to MEC Towing & Transport)
- HR 52 – 1999 Kenworth W900L 2007 Century 5230 (30 Ton) Wrecker, (sold in 2013 (1st HR 52) to Peninsula Towing on Vancouver Island)
- HR 52 – 2009 Kenworth T800 Century 5230 (Adam's truck) (30 Ton) Wrecker, (sold to Tonk's Towing in Richmond B.C, 2022 sold to Mario's Towing in Kelowna B.C.)
- TR 57 – Western Star, (sold to Van Horne Towing)
- TR 58 – Western Star, (Sold)?
- 59 - Kenworth DTU (Chassis Scrapped, DTU bought by Aggressive Towing)
- MR 60 – “Army” International, Holmes 600 (16 Ton) Wrecker (Chassis in Jamie Yard?, wrecker off unit)
- MR 62 –1993 GMC Topkick, Holmes 600 (16 Ton) Wrecker (Last Owner - Vista Towing Sask.)
- HR 63 "Mighty Mo" - 1993 Western Star, Holmes 850 (40 Ton) wrecker, (sold 2024 to Coquihalla Towing)
- MR 64 / Coastline 43 – 2009 Peterbilt Century 3212 (16 Ton) Wrecker, (Owned by Coquitlam Towing)
- HR 64 - International Holmes 750 (25 Ton) Wrecker (Wheel lift on Mighty Mo, truck scrapped)
- HR 66 – International Century 925 (25 Ton) Wrecker, (sold to Columbia towing, sold 2020 to Kool Country Towing in BC)
- 68 - 1997 Ford F-Super Duty F550 Jerrdan Wrecker ( Ton) (Ex Aggressive Towing, Teal)
- HR 68 – 2007 Western Star 4900sb, 2013 Century 5230 (30 Ton) Wrecker, (Bought for Scott Bird, used in Alberta by Colin, Johnny), sold to Berg's Towing in IL, sold to Val-U Auto & Towing in Owego, NY, and in July 2021 at Lil Pete's Automotive in Mahopac, NY, Mike's Connecticut
- HR 70 "The General" – 1981 GMC Brigadier General, Holmes 1801 (45 Ton) Wrecker, (sold June 2021 to Hustler Towing in Olds Alberta, wrecker sold to BRW Services)
- HR 85 – 1985 Kenworth LW900, Century 1040 (40 Ton) Wrecker (bought from Ben's Towing in 2021), sold to Steve's Towing, Clinton, British Columbia (Restored)
- IR 108 – 2013 Ram 5500 4-wheel drive, Century 602 (8 Ton) Wrecker (Sold to Sorrento Towing)
- FD 110 - Peterbilt Century Tandem Flat Deck
- FD 114 - 2001 Freightliner Tandem Axle, 30' Century Flat Deck, (15 Ton)(sold 2022 to Peninsula Towing September)
- HR 116 – 2015 Western Star 4900sb, Century 9055 (50 Ton) Wrecker, (sold to Reliable Towing Merritt, BC, currently Ben's Towing Fleet)
- HR 117 – 2015 Western Star 4900sb, Tri Axle Century 9055 with SP-850 XP side puller (50 ton) Wrecker, sold to Berg's Towing in Monmouth, IL, traded in to Zip's and then to A+ Towing, Warner Towing, Sask. (2026)
- FD 121 – 2015 Freightliner M2 106, 23' Century 16 Series (8 Ton) Flat Deck, (sold 2019 to Aggressive Towing)
- FD 122 – 2015 Freightliner M2 106, 23' Century 16 Series (8 Ton) Flat Deck, (Became FD 124)
- FD 124 – 2015? Freightliner M2 106, 23' Century 16 Series (8 Ton) Flat Deck, (Rob Mitchell's flat deck truck that was severely damaged in a rollover incident, recovered by Jamie in HWH, Status unknown)
- HR 126 – 1999 Peterbilt 379, 2015 Vulcan V70 (25 Ton) Wrecker (sold January 2021 to Peninsula Towing in Vancouver Island)
- HR 127 – 2019 Mack Anthem, Century 5230 (30 Ton) Wrecker, Burned in a fire due to brakes catching fire on a downhill while towing a tractor on May 16, 2022.
- TR 128 - 2016 Volvo 770 Tractor (Sold)
- HR 130 "Lucy"- 2020 Peterbilt 389, Century 5230; 30 Ton Wrecker (2026 Traded in commercial truck for new unit, Bought in Sept 9, 2026 by Tow of the Day, Mission )
- FD 131 – 2021 Ford F-550 XLT, 19' Century 10 Series Flat Deck (5 Ton) (SOLD)
- MR 134 - 2022 Freightliner M2 Extended Cab, Century 3212 (16 ton) Wrecker (Sold June 2025 to Tiger Towing, Duncan)
- FD 501 - 2011 Kenworth Tandem (15 Ton) Flat Deck (Sold 2015 to Mid Island Towing)
- LR 19 – 2019 F550 Chevron 408 (8 Ton) Wrecker - (Sold 2025 Pro Tow, Vernon)

Rotators

- HR 150 – 2008 Peterbilt 357 Twin axle Century 1075 (75 ton), sold to United Towing Services Inc in Canmore, AB, sold to FIFE in Washington state, then sold to Purdy's towing in Oregon
- HR 150 "The Famous Rotator" – 2012 Western Star 4900SB Tri Axle Century 1075 (75 ton), sold to Berg's Towing in Monmouth, IL, traded in to Zip's, July 2021 Ron's Towing Lincoln, IL

Miscellaneous Former Trucks

- Blue Freightliner Tractor (Scrapped)
- White & Red Peterbilt Tractor (Sold)
- Red & Brown Peterbilt Tractor (Sold)
- 2006 Ford F350 XL SD Century 411 Wrecker, (8 Ton) (Ex totem)
- 2006 Ford F450 Century Wrecker, ( Ton) (Ex totem)
- Coastline 44 - Ford F350 ( Ton) (Ex totem)
- IR 109 - Ford F450 (BCAA) Decals ( Ton) (Ex totem)
- IR 112 - Ford F350 ( Ton) (Ex totem)

Support Trucks & Flagging

- HU 55 - International Incident Response Truck (Sold)
- AC 103 - 2002 GMC (Sold)
  - IR 104 – Toyota Tundra
  - IR 105 – Toyota Tundra
  - IR 106 – Toyota Tundra
  - IR 107 – Toyota Tundra
  - IR 118 – Ford F150
- R 120 – Rescue truck (Not Running)
- E 121 - 1989 Ford F800 Pumper (Not Running)
  - White GMC Pick up
  - Red Chevrolet 2500 Pick Up

=== Quiring Towing Fleet ===
- Unit 90 "The Green Goblin" – 2007 Kenworth T800H with a Vulcan V100 tri-axle wrecker with side puller
- Unit 55 "Plan B" – 2017 KW T800 V100 Vulcan tandem wrecker
- Unit 75 - 2027 Kenworth T480V with a Century 4024 (20 Ton)
- Unit 95 – 2009 Kenworth T300 single axle, Challenger (20 ton)
- Unit 85 – 2016 Kenworth T800 28-foot Tandem NRC 40TB Flatdeck
- Unit 50 – 2016 Kenworth T470 26-foot Jerr-Dan Flatdeck with SRS10 Side Recovery System (10 ton)
- Unit ?? - 2021 Ford 22-foot Deck truck
- Unit C60 – 1973 GMC 3-ton Holmes 500 Wrecker
- Unit 25 – 1985 GMC Service Truck
- Unit ?? - 1964 D9 Dozer
- Unit ?? - 1967 D9 Dozer

== Spinoff ==
On October 10, 2016, the pilot for Heavy Rescue: 401, a spinoff series set in Ontario, aired on the Discovery Channel. The first season of Heavy Rescue: 401 debuted on January 3, 2017.
