= Peter W. Klein =

American journalist

- Born: Cincinnati, Ohio, United States
- Citizenship: Canadian, American, Hungarian
- Education: Columbia University (M.S. in Journalism, 1993); Pennsylvania State University (B.A. in Philosophy, Honors Degree in Economics, Honors Degree in Science Technology and Society, 1991)
- Occupations: Journalist, television and documentary film producer, professor
- Known for: Investigative and global reporting (earning three Emmys, and numerous other awards)
- Website: globalreportingcentre.org

Peter W. Klein is an Emmy Award-winning journalist, documentary filmmaker, professor, and media leader. He was the founder of the Global Reporting Centre, a non-profit organization dedicated to innovating how global investigative journalism is funded, produced and finds audiences. A hallmark of the centre is collaboration, as well as experimentation with new forms of reporting, including empowerment journalism.

From 2023 to 2025, Klein was the executive editor at NBC News. Prior to that, he was an investigative producer for 60 Minutes at CBS and an investigative producer at ABC News' Law & Justice unit. He is a contributor to the documentary series PBS Frontline, where his work has been honored with the Emmy for Best Investigative Magazine, as well as the Investigative Reporters and Editors Award and the Sigma Delta Chi Award. He was a regular contributor to The New York Times series Retro Report, focusing on national security stories. He previously wrote a column for The Globe and Mail.

From 2009 to 2010 Klein was the host of the Canadian current affairs interview program The Standard. From 2010 to 2015 he was the Director of the University of British Columbia's Graduate School of Journalism where he continues to serve as a professor and runs the Global Reporting Program, in which he works with students around the world to collaborate on major reporting projects. His journalism has earned recognition from leading professional organizations, including the National Academy of Television Arts & Sciences (three Emmy Awards), Society of Professional Journalists (two Sigma Delta Chis), Radio Television Digital News Association (numerous Edward R. Murrows), International Academy of Digital Arts and Sciences (Webby Honor) and the Online Journalism Organization (ONA).

== Early life ==
Klein was born to immigrants who fled the Hungarian Revolution of 1956. His father Fred was a knife sharpener and burr hand at the Ford automotive plant in Sharonville, Ohio. His mother Alice was a bookkeeper at a bank. The family spoke Hungarian at home, and Klein maintains dual American and Hungarian citizenship. He was born in Cincinnati, Ohio, and grew up in Miami Beach, Florida.

== Career ==
In the early 1990s, Klein worked as a public radio reporter during the Bosnian War while freelancing print stories for various publications. In 1994, he helped found VNI New York Times Television, which pioneered foreign news reporting using small format Hi-8 cameras. He went from there to become a senior producer for CBS News' cable channel, Eye on People, and co-created a documentary series called I Witness, where video journalists spent months covering one topic.

In 1996 Klein left CBS to become a producer at ABC News' Law and Justice Unit. There he conducted investigations for 20/20, Nightline, and World News Tonight. In the late 90s he and correspondent John Miller investigated anti-government militias, as well as Eric Rudolph of the Army of God’s string of abortion clinic attacks. Klein and correspondent Elizabeth Vargas investigated the wrongful conviction of a woman named Betty Tyson and helped overturn her conviction, a project which earned Vargas her first Emmy nomination. Klein also filmed, edited and produced documentary specials for Nightline, following people over long periods of time, including the abortion clinic bombing victim Emily Lyons as she spent her first year recovering from a near-fatal blast. In a project entitled "Life & Death", Klein shadowed Noel Earley, a Vietnam veteran dying of amyotrophic lateral sclerosis, as he fought for the right to use doctor-assisted suicide. In another project, Klein followed a convicted child molester from the day he was released from prison. Over a six-month period, Klein documented his journey moving back into society, showing the police notifications, the community meetings and the pedophile's life at his mother's house.

In 1999, Klein joined 60 Minutes as a staff producer. In 2000 he and Mike Wallace reported on the threat posed by unsecured smallpox virus samples, and on September 5, 2001, their report won a News and Documentary Emmy. After 9/11, Klein went on to work with Wallace covering the aftermath of the terrorist attacks. Their interview with Secretary of Health Tommy Thompson, in which Thompson insisted the country was completely safe from any biological attack, led to a Senate hearing about US biowarfare preparedness. Klein was one of the first network magazine producers to travel to Iraq after the invasion and, working with correspondent Bob Simon, he secured the first and to-date, only Western TV interview with the Shiite cleric Muqtada Al-Sadr.

Throughout his career, Klein has reported on public and mental health, earning two Emmy Awards for projects on pandemics, and was co-producer of Unseen Enemy, a feature documentary directed by Janet Tobias about the risks of global pandemics. Other areas of investigation include corruption and national security.

In 2006, Klein launched an investigative series for the History Channel called Beyond Top Secret. The series received two Emmy nominations in 2007 and was featured on a segment of The Daily Show with Jon Stewart. He was the director and producer of the Emmy-nominated documentary Over a Barrel, an ABC News special project about the business of the oil industry. Klein has also contributed business reporting and documentaries to CNBC and CBS News, and earned several Business News Emmy Award nominations, including for a 60 Minutes investigation into market timing in the mutual fund industry.

In 2009, Klein became the host of a weekly current affairs program on VisionTV and JoyTV in Canada called The Standard. Some of his notable guests have included former Mossad director Efraim Halevy and Nate Phelps, son of the radical anti-gay preacher Fred Phelps.

Klein has written for The New York Times, The Globe and Mail, The Miami Herald, The Christian Science Monitor, and numerous other publications during his career.

Klein directed the 2024 documentary film Bribe, Inc. which explores the corrupt practices of the Monaco-based company Unaoil.

== Teaching ==
In addition to his professional work, Klein has been teaching journalism since 1998, initially at New York University and Columbia University Graduate School of Journalism. In 2005, Klein became a professor at the University of British Columbia's School of Journalism, where he teaches investigative reporting, documentary production and global reporting. In 2009, with the support of a $1 million donation from Mindset Foundation, he founded the International Reporting Program in which he took graduate students overseas to produce long-form reporting projects. In 2009, his class produced a documentary for PBS Frontline/World called "Digital Dumping Ground" in which they traced the path of electronic waste to three continents. The project won the Emmy Award for Outstanding Investigative in a Newsmagazine. The course has developed into a more collaborative Global Reporting Program in which students at universities around the world work together to produce journalism in partnership with major media organizations.
