= University of British Columbia School of Journalism, Writing, and Media =

Coordinates: 49.2678°N 123.2578°W

- Established: 1997
- Location: Vancouver, British Columbia, Canada
- Website: journalism.ubc.ca

The University of British Columbia School of Journalism, Writing, and Media (JWAM) offers a two-year Masters of Journalism program offered at the University of British Columbia's Point Grey campus in Vancouver, British Columbia. The program requires students to focus on an area of reporting specialization. The school has also developed a reputation in teaching multimedia journalism and was one of the first programs in North America to replace craft streams with an integrated journalism curriculum. The program has 60 students a year, with close to 20 faculty members, adjuncts and staff. Faculty members come from a variety of traditional and new media organizations including CBC, BBC News Online, CBS News 60 Minutes, The Globe and Mail, The Vancouver Sun, and The Tyee.

== History ==
The Graduate School of Journalism at the University of British Columbia was established on July 24, 1996 as an academic unit within UBC's Faculty of Arts. The building in which it is currently housed, the 3-story Sing Tao building, was opened on Aug. 27, 1997, and the school accepted its first class of students in September 1998.

Donna Logan was the founding director in 1998, and the school graduated its first class in 2000. In January 2020, the school expanded to become the School of Journalism, Writing and Media, bringing together the graduate Master of Journalism program and the undergraduate Arts Studies in Research and Writing program.

== Curriculum ==
The Master of Journalism degree is a professional graduate program running over five terms with a mandatory professional internship during the summer.

The two-term Integrated Journalism (IJ) course is taken by every student during their first year. IJ provides a basic foundation in the grammar and syntax of news writing while introducing students to media across platforms including audio, visual and print. Working in a newsroom setting, students learn reporting basics and the importance of deadlines. Student projects are published on The Thunderbird.ca, the school's award-winning online news service. First-year students are also required to take Media Law.

Students are required to complete a 12-week internship during the summer between first and second years.

The program requires students to take 3 graduate level academic courses in a specialization, which builds the foundation for their reporting on a yearlong final research project, which usually consists of a major multimedia reporting project.

Graduates of the program have gone on to work as reporters, producers and managers at some of the top news organizations in the world including CBC News, The Globe and Mail, The Toronto Star, National Public Radio, CBS News and Al Jazeera English. Many also pursue successful careers as free-lance journalists or as media entrepreneurs.

== Specialized Courses ==
Reporting in Indigenous Communities provides students an understanding of local First Nations culture and history as well as trends in contemporary media portrayals of indigenous peoples in B.C. Some participating First Nations include Squamish Nation, Tsleil-watuth First Nation, Tsawwassen First Nation, and Sto:lo Tribal Council. Students are admitted to this class by way of an application process. The course is taught by CBC National reporter Duncan McCue, who developed the course during a Knight-Stanford fellowship.

The International Reporting Program was created by professor Peter W. Klein with a $1 million donation from philanthropist Alison Lawton’s Mindset Foundation. Students research under-reported global stories and then travel abroad and report in the field alongside industry veterans. Previous projects include Ghana: Digital Dumping Ground, the Emmy Award-winning collaboration with Frontline World, and Freedom from Pain, a documentary airing on Al Jazeera English and awarded second place in the 2011 Awards for Excellence in Health Care Journalism. The school also collaborated with The New York Times in 2012 to produce two web documentaries exploring development pressures and land disputes in Brazil.

Decoding Social Media: Theory and Practice provides students with an advanced understanding of how media is being transformed by social networking technologies and shifting patterns of human communication and interaction. The course was first launched in January 2013 in partnership with the UBC Sauder School of Business. It was created by UBC journalism professor Alfred Hermida and marketing instructor Paul Cubbon. The course brings together journalism and business students to work on social media projects for media partners, including The Vancouver Sun, CBC Music, Global BC and Vancouver Magazine.
