= Alison Lawton =

Canadian social venture philanthropist

- Born: May 29, 1970 (age 56); Montreal, Quebec, Canada
- Notable work: Uganda Rising
- Spouse: Frank Giustra (m. 2000; div. 2007)
- Children: 2

Alison Lawton (born May 29, 1970) is a Canadian social venture philanthropist, social advocate, and business investor.

== Personal life ==
Alison Lawton was born in Montreal, Quebec, Canada. She attended the United Nations Earth Summit in Rio de Janeiro in 1992, after which she started volunteer work for Earth Day International. This fundraising work led her to approach David Richardson who convinced her to join Investor First Financial to learn about investing.

Lawton graduated with a Bachelor of Arts degree in Communication Studies from Concordia University in 1995. After graduating, she joined Investor First Financial in Vancouver, BC where she started her business career in private equity sales in the areas of syndicated software, film, television, real estate and tax shelter offerings.

In 1997, Lawton founded her own private equity boutique investment firm, Winfield Venture Group Ltd, now known as Mindset Venture Group Ltd.

Lawton completed a Master of Arts degree in Applied Sciences at Simon Fraser University in 2006. Her thesis focused on "the role of the media in creating value in financial markets."

In 2000, Lawton married Canadian businessman and philanthropist Frank Giustra. They separated in 2007 and have two children together. Lawton is currently in a relationship with Venezuelan actress, model and philanthropist Patricia Velásquez.

== Business career ==
In 1998, Lawton was one of three founding partners of Vancouver-based leading tech incubator IdeaPark Ventures, Inc. that was listed on the Toronto Stock Exchange. In 2000, IdeaPark sold to Itemus Inc – a dot com incubator co-founded by Goldcorp mining magnate Ian Telfer.

Lawton continued her business career by investing in start-up companies and was an early stage investor in Alida (previously known as Vision Critical) and Yoga. Other portfolio companies included BC based software start-ups Sosido Networks, Strutta, and Tyze Personal Networks. Alison served on the Board of Directors of Vision Critical, now known as Alida, as well as the advisory board of LX Ventures Inc.

She was an early investor in the Acumen Fund, one of the first impact investment funds in the US. She partnered with Richard Branson’s Virgin Unite and the MaRS Centre for Impact Investing to launch Canada’s first social impact investment fund, the MaRS Catalyst Fund, now known as Amplify Capital. Alison’ is also a founding investor and a board member of Canada's first health related social impact bond, Activate, created by the Heart & Stroke Foundation in collaboration with the Public Health Agency of Canada and the MaRS Centre for Impact Investing.

Lawton continues to invest in early stage companies with rapid growth potential through her Vancouver-based private boutique investment firm Mindset Venture Group Ltd.. Mindset Venture Group Ltd invests in a variety of industries including consumer products, with a focus on health & wellness and food & beverage, as well as SaaS, fintech, healthtech.

== Philanthropy and advocacy ==
In 2005, Lawton was appointed Chair of the Unite for Children, Unite Against AIDS campaign for UNICEF Canada. Some of her campaign initiatives included producing the Unite against AIDS concert series, including artists Avril Lavigne, John Mayer, and Sarah McLachlan, and UNICEF's first Canadian art auction, Unite with Art. The events raised funds for UNICEF, as well as the consciousness around HIV/AIDS and how it redefines childhood for millions of children worldwide. Alison also produced a 25-minute educational documentary for UNICEF; Hope in the Time of AIDS featured Stephen Lewis and was narrated by Pierce Brosnan.

Lawton met Lloyd Axworthy, former Director of the University of British Columbia's Liu Institute for Global Issues and former Canadian Foreign Affairs Minister, in 2004. He encouraged her to cover the forcible conscription of children in Uganda's civil war. After a trip to Uganda she struggled with how to properly publicize the plight of the Acholi children in Uganda and consulted with former President Bill Clinton, whom she met while touring Africa with UNICEF and the Clinton Foundation. On request from the Dalai Lama Center for Peace and Education, she flew to India to present her work and also consult with the Dalai Lama. The spiritual leader told her to stop worrying and "work from a place in your heart." What started off as an educational video that Axworthy could use for lobbying, ended up becoming "Uganda Rising", a full-length documentary that chronicled the 20-year civil war in the country. Written and co-directed (with Jesse James Miller) by Pete McCormack, and narrated by Kevin Spacey, it screened at more than 25 film festivals worldwide and was the recipient of the Best Documentary Award at several festivals including WT Os International Film Festival and Full Frame Documentary Film Festival.

In 2006, Lawton founded Mindset Media Society, now known as Mindset Social Innovation Foundation. Mindset Foundation is a registered Canadian charity. Lawton also joined the Board of Directors of the Sarah McLachlan Foundation in 2006. The Sarah McLachlan Foundation is a registered charity that primarily supports the Sarah McLachlan School of Music which provides free music education to at-risk youth.

Lawton donated $1M to the University of British Columbia Graduate School of Journalism in 2009 to establish the International Reporting Program. The International Reporting Program (IRP) ran for ten years and gave journalism graduate students the opportunity to report on under-reported global issues. The students of the first year of the program won an Emmy for the investigative journalism short film 'Ghana: Digital Dumping Ground’. After the completion of the IRP, the UBC Global Reporting Program (GRP) launched in 2020. Lawton holds the position of Honorary Chair of the GRP's Advisory Board.

In 2009, Lawton launched the Open Health Initiative as the new focus of Mindset Foundation. Research commissioned by the Foundation identified that the North American public had limited awareness of the problem, and supported the launch of the Access Our Medicine Initiative in 2014. Since then, over 130,000 people from 160 countries have signed a declaration calling on stakeholders to work together to find solutions. Mindset Foundation's support of social innovators also led Lawton and her team to partner with the Dispensary of Hope, a US 501(c)(3) charitable medication distributor based in Nashville, TN, on a $200M drug recovery program through a commitment to action through the Clinton Global Initiative.

In 2019, Pain BC, a non-profit organization advocating for the treatment and support of people living with chronic pain, approached Lawton to help expand its offering across Canada. Mindset Foundation supported Pain BC's partnership with the Angus Reid Institute, that led to the commissioning of an independent research study on chronic pain in Canada.

Lawton is also a supporter and donor to the UBC CampOUT! initiative, a summer leadership and learning camp for queer, trans, Two-Spirit, questioning, and allied youth from across BC and the Yukon.

Lawton joined the World Refugee and Migration Council's Canadian Task Force Against Global Corruption in 2023. One focus of the task force is to promote the repurposing of frozen and seized assets, in accordance with Canada's Special Economic Measures Act and its regulations. Lawton published a paper on the viability of creating The Canadian-Ukrainian Social Impact Reconstruction Trust Fund to aid victims of the unlawful occupation of Ukraine by Russian forces.

In November 2024, Mindset Social Innovation Foundation partnered with the Angus Reid Institute and the World Refugee & Migration Council to run a public opinion survey on Canadian's perceptions of Corruption in their communities and Canada nationwide. The results of the research were announced at a panel event in Vancouver.

== Awards, appointments and memberships ==
- UNICEF's Champion for Children Award (2006)
- UNICEF Canada Unite for Children, Unite against AIDS Chairperson (2006–2010)
- Simon Fraser University Outstanding Alumni Award for Community Service (2007)
- Business in Vancouver's Top 40 Under 40 Award (2006)
- Appointed to the John F. Kennedy School of Government Women's Leadership Board at Harvard University
- Previously: Advisory Committee for Virgin Unite Canada
- Previously: BC Advisory Council for Social Entrepreneurship
- Member of the UBC Graduate School of Journalism Advisory Board
- Capilano University Doctor of Letters, honoris causa (2025)
