= List of programs broadcast by Slice =

The following is a current list of programs broadcast by the Canadian TV channel Slice, and its former incarnation as Life Network.

== Current programming ==
As of August 2025:

=== Acquired programming ===
- Backyard Builds
- Carnival Eats
- The Daily Show
- Date My Mate
- Disaster Decks
- Ghosts
- The Goldbergs
- Jersey Shore: Family Vacation
- The King of Queens
- Love After Lockup
- Love It or List It
- The Marriage Pact
- Property Brothers: Buying & Selling
- Real Girlfriends in Paris
- The Real Housewives of Miami
- The Real Housewives of Melbourne
- Rules of Engagement
- Superstore

== Past programming ==
=== Original programming ===
- At the End of My Leash
- Big Brother Canada
- Birth Days
- Brides of Beverly Hills
- Bulging Brides
- Cake Walk
- Cake Walk: Wedding Cake Edition
- Carlawood
- Child Star
- Crash Test Mommy
- Dogs with Jobs
- Dr. in the House
- Extreme Collectors
- Ex-Wives of Rock
- Four Weddings Canada
- Intervention Canada
- The Last 10 Pounds Bootcamp
- The List
- Lost and Sold
- Marriage Under Construction
- Matchmaker
- The Mistress
- Money Moron
- Mother of the Bride
- My Teenage Wedding
- Outlaw In-Laws
- Princess
- Project Runway Canada
- The Real Housewives of Toronto
- The Real Housewives of Vancouver
- Renovate My Wardrobe
- Rich Bride, Poor Bride
- Rich Groom, Poor Groom
- Rocker Moms
- Three Takes
- Til Debt Do Us Part
- U8TV: The Lofters
- Unusually Thicke
- Wedding SOS
- X-Weighted

=== Acquired programming ===
- 48 Hours Mystery
- 72 Hours
- Average Joe
- Beautiful People
- Bethenny Ever After...
- Bethenny Getting Married?
- Big Brother: After Dark
- Big City Broker
- The Biggest Loser
- Border Security: Canada's Front Line
- Buy Me
- Canada Sings
- Casino Confidential
- Celebrity Paranormal Project
- Dance Moms
- Entertainment Tonight Canada
- The Ex-Wives Club
- Face to Face with David
- Friends
- The Glee Project
- The Hero
- I Do, Let's Eat
- Karma's A B*tch
- Kendra on Top
- King of the Nerds
- Kitchen Nightmares
- Million Dollar Listing Miami
- Million Dollar Listing New York
- The Millionaire Matchmaker
- Mob Wives
- The Mom Show
- Murder in Paradise
- Newlywed, Nearly Dead
- One Born Every Minute
- Online Dating Rituals of the American Male
- Party Mamas
- Property Shop
- Property Virgins
- The Real Housewives of Atlanta
- The Real Housewives of Beverly Hills
- The Real Housewives of DC
- The Real Housewives of New Jersey
- The Real Housewives of New York City
- The Real Housewives of Orange County
- See No Evil
- The Singles Project
- Southern Charm
- A Stranger in My Home
- Supernanny
- Surviving Evil
- Tabatha Takes Over
- Tabatha's Salon Takeovers
- Tim Gunn's Guide To Style
- Tori & Dean: Home Sweet Hollywood
- Tori & Dean: Inn Love
- Tori & Dean: sTORIbook Weddings
- Trading Spouses
