= List of programs broadcast by Global Television Network =

This is a list of television programs currently, formerly, and soon to be broadcast by the Global Television Network, a national broadcast network owned by Corus Entertainment.

== Current programming ==
=== Original series ===
==== Drama ====
- Murder in a Small Town (2024) (Note: Co-production with Fox)

==== Reality/docuseries ====
- The Fish'n Canada Show (1986)
- Crime Beat (2020)

==== News programming ====
- Global News Morning (2001)
- Global National (2001)
- The Morning Show (2011)
- The West Block (2011)

==== Awards shows ====
- Canadian Screen Awards (2026)

=== Canadian repeats ===
- Backyard Builds
- Border Security: Canada's Front Line (2016)
- Carnival Eats
- Disaster DIY
- Farmhouse Facelift (2024)
- Leave It to Bryan
- Masters of Flip
- The Firm (2012 TV series) (2012)
- Private Eyes (2016)
- Property Brothers
- Property Brothers: Forever Home (2023)
- Rock Solid Builds (2024)
- Rust Valley Restorers (2020–21; 2023)
- Sarah's Mountain Escape (2024)
- Save My Reno (2020)

=== American series ===
Show	Type	Original network	Aired since
48 Hours	News	CBS	2020
60 Minutes	News	CBS	1980–2000; 2020
9-1-1	Drama	FOX/ABC	2018
Abbott Elementary	Comedy	ABC	2022
Big Brother USA	Reality	CBS	2000
Doc	Drama	FOX	2025
The Drew Barrymore Show	Talk show	Syndication	2020
Elsbeth	Dramedy	CBS	2024
Entertainment Tonight	News	Syndication	2005
FBI	Drama	CBS	2018
Fire Country	Drama	CBS	2022
Ghosts	Comedy	CBS	2021
The Goldbergs (reruns)	Sitcom	ABC	2023
Joel Osteen	Christian talk show	Syndication	Continuing on-air
The Late Show with Stephen Colbert	Late-night talk show	CBS	2015
Life Today with James Robison	Christian talk show	Syndication	2014
Matlock	Drama	CBS	2024
NCIS	Drama	CBS	2003
NCIS: Origins	Drama	CBS	2024
NCIS: Sydney	Drama	CBS	2023
The Neighborhood	Comedy	CBS	2018
Raid the Cage	Game show	CBS	2023
Saturday Night Live	Sketch comedy	NBC	1980; 1985
Survivor	Reality	CBS	2001
Tamron Hall	Talk show	Syndication	2019
Tough as Nails	Reality	CBS	2020
The Wall	Game show	NBC	2016
Watson	Drama	CBS	2025
The Young and the Restless	Soap opera	CBS	1984

== Former programming ==
=== Drama ===
Canadian series

- Adventure Inc. (2002–03)
- The Adventures of Sinbad
- Andromeda
- Blackfly
- Bomb Girls (2012–13)
- Continuum
- Danger Bay (1994–97)
- Departure (2020–23)
- Destiny Ridge (1993–95)
- Falcon Beach
- Family Law (2021–26)
- Global Playhouse (1984–86)
- The Hardy Boys (2022)
- Jake and the Kid (1995–99)
- Mary Kills People (2017–19)
- Mutant X
- Nurses (2020–21)
- The Outer Limits
- Psi Factor (1996–2003)
- Queen of Swords (2000–01)
- Ransom (2017–19)
- Remedy (2014–15)
- Robyn Hood (2023)
- Rookie Blue (2010–15)
- Traders
- Train 48
- Troupers (1985–88)
- Zoe Busiek: Wild Card

Acquired programming

- 90210 (2008–2012)
- Action (1999–2000)
- Adam-12
- Adderly
- The Agency (2001–2003)
- Alfred Hitchcock Presents
- Almost Human (2013–2014)
- American Gothic (2016)
- Awake (2012)
- Battle Creek (March 1 – May 24, 2015)
- Beverly Hills, 90210 (1991–2000)
- The Black Donnellys (2007)
- The Blacklist (2013–2017; 2019–2023)
- Blood & Treasure (2019)
- The Blue Knight
- The Bold and the Beautiful (1987–1995)
- Bones (2005–2017)
- Boston Public (2000–2004)
- Brimstone (1998–1999)
- Brothers & Sisters (2006–2011)
- Bull (2016–22)
- Charlie's Angels (1979–1988)
- Chicago Fire (2012–2019)
- Chicago Hope (1994–2000)
- Chicago Justice (2017)
- Chicago Med (2015–2019)
- Chicago PD (2014–2019)
- The Code (2019)
- The Colbys
- Columbo
- Combat Hospital (2011)
- The Commish (1991–1995)
- Constantine (2014–2015)
- Containment (April 19 – July 19, 2016)
- Conviction (2006)
- Cop Rock (1990)
- Crossing Jordan
- CSI: Vegas (2021–2024)
- Dawson's Creek (1998–2003)
- Dark Angel (2001–02)
- Day Break
- Days of Our Lives (1984–2022)
- Destiny Ridge (1993–1995)
- Doc
- Dollhouse (2009–2011)
- Doogie Howser, M.D.
- Dracula
- Dynasty
- Early Edition (1997–2000)
- Elementary (2012–19)
- Extant
- Family Law (2001–02)
- Falcon Crest (1984–1986)
- Fantasy Island (1979–1984)
- The Finder (2012)
- Finder of Lost Loves (1984–1985)
- The Firm (2012)
- Freakylinks (2000–2001)
- Friday Night Lights
- The Fugitive
- General Hospital (1991–2000)
- Get Real (1999–2000)
- A Gifted Man (2012)
- Gilmore Girls (2000–2007)
- The Good Fight (2019)
- The Good Wife (2009–2016)
- Gracepoint (2014)
- The Guard (2008–2009)
- Guiding Light
- Hack (2002–2004)
- The Handler (2003–2004)
- Harsh Realm (1999)
- Harper's Island
- Harry's Law (2011–2012)
- Hawaii Five-0 (2010–2020)
- Heartbeat
- Hercules: The Legendary Journeys
- Heroes (2006–2010)
- Heroes Reborn
- Hotel
- Houdini & Doyle (2016, 2019)
- House (2004–2012)
- Homicide: Life on the Street (1993–1994)
- In the Heat of the Night
- The InBetween (2019)
- Instinct (2018–19)
- Ironside (2013)
- Jack & Jill (1999–2000)
- Judging Amy (2001–2005)
- Kidnapped
- Knots Landing (1983–1986)
- Kung Fu (1983–1986)
- L.A. Dragnet (2003–2004)
- Las Vegas (2003–2008)
- Last Resort (2012)
- LAX (2004–2005)
- L.A. Law
- Life (2007–2009)
- Life on Mars (2008–2009)
- Limitless (2015–2016)
- The Lyon's Den (2003)
- The Lone Gunmen (2001)
- Loving Friends and Perfect Couples (1983)
- MacGyver (2016–2021)
- Madam Secretary (2014–2020)
- Made in Jersey
- Matt Helm (1975–1976)
- Miami Vice (1988–1989)
- Mickey Spillane's Mike Hammer
- Midnight, Texas (2017–2019)
- Millennium (1996–1999)
- Minority Report (September 21 – November 30, 2015)
- Mobile One (1975)
- Monarch (2022)
- Murder, She Wrote (1986–1996)
- My Own Worst Enemy (2008)
- NCIS: Hawai'i (2021–2024)
- NCIS: Los Angeles (2009–2023)
- The New Alfred Hitchcock Presents
- New Amsterdam (2018–2023)
- Next (2020)
- The Night Shift
- NUMB3RS (2005–2010)
- NYC 22 (2012)
- NYPD Blue (1994–2005)
- Off the Map (2011)
- Paradise Beach
- Parenthood (March 2, 2010-January 29, 2015)
- Partners in Crime
- Party of Five (1994–2000)
- Passions
- Pitch (2016)
- The Practice
- Presidio Med (2002–2003)
- Prime Suspect
- Prodigal Son (2019–21)
- Psych (2007–March 26, 2014)
- Pure Genius (2016–2017)
- Rawhide (1989–1990)
- Ringer (2011–2012)
- Runaway
- Ryan Caulfield: Year One (1999)
- Santa Barbara (1988–1991)
- Sleepy Hollow (2013–2016)
- Smallville (2001–2002)
- St. Elsewhere (1984–1988)
- Six Degrees (2006–2007)
- Stalker
- Standoff
- Starsky & Hutch (1979–1980)
- State of Affairs (November 17, 2014–February 16, 2015)
- The Street (2000)
- Supergirl (2015–2016)
- Shark (2006–2008)
- So Help Me Todd (2022–2024)
- T. and T. (1988–1991)
- That's Life (2000–2001)
- Threshold (2005)
- Timeless (2016–2018)
- Time of Your Life (1999–2000)
- Tommy (2020)
- Touch (2012–2013)
- Touched by an Angel (2001–2003)
- Under the Dome (2013–2015)
- The Unusuals (2009)
- Vanished
- Vegas (2012–2013)
- The Visitor (1997–1998)
- Without a Trace (2002–2007)
- Women of the Movement (2022)
- Wonderfalls
- The X-Files
- Xena: Warrior Princess
- Yellowstone (2023–2024)

=== Comedy ===
Canadian series

- Bob and Margaret
- The Jane Show
- Shhh It's The News (1974)
- Second City TV (1976–1980)
- Super Dave (1988–1994)

Acquired programming

- 3rd Rock from the Sun (1996–2001)
- Abby's (2019)
- About a Boy (February 22, 2014–February 20, 2015)
- Alice
- Allen Gregory (2011)
- America 2-Night (1978–1980)
- American Dad! (2005–2018)
- Angel from Hell
- Any Day Now (1999–2000)
- A.P. Bio (2018–2019)
- Are You Being Served?
- Are You There, Chelsea? (2012)
- Arrested Development (2003–2006)
- Baby Blues (2000)
- Bad Judge
- Battery Park (2000)
- Becker (2001–2004)
- The Benny Hill Show
- Bob's Burgers (2011–2015)
- Bram & Alice (2002)
- The Brian Benben Show (1998)
- Broke (2020)
- Carol's Second Act (2019–2020)
- Caroline in the City (1995–1999)
- Cheers (1990–1993)
- Chico and the Man (1977–1985)
- Clueless (1996–2001)
- The Cleveland Show (2009–2013)
- Coach (1989–1997)
- Cosby (1998–1999)
- Crazy Ex-Girlfriend (2015–2019)
- Daddio (2000; season 1)
- Dave's World (1993–1998)
- Dharma & Greg (1997–2001)
- Diff'rent Strokes (1983–1985)
- DiResta (1998–1999)
- Doctor in the House (1974–1975, 1981–1985)
- Doctor on the Go (1975–1979)
- E/R (1984–1985)
- Everybody Loves Raymond (2001–2005)
- The Exes (February–June 2012)
- Family Guy (1999–2015)
- Fernwood 2 Night (1977–1978)
- Ferris Bueller (1990–1991)
- Frasier (1993–2004)
- Friends (1994–2004)
- Futurama (1999–2003)
- Game of Silence (April 12 – June 5, 2016)
- Gilligan's Island (1975–1984)
- Grace Under Fire
- Go On
- The Good Place (2016–2020)
- Good Sam (2022)
- Good Times (1974–1984)
- The Great Indoors (2016–2017)
- Growing Up Fisher (Feb. 23 – June 11, 2014)
- Guys With Kids
- Hangin' with Mr. Cooper
- I Hate My Teenage Daughter (2011–2012)
- The Hughleys (1998–2000)
- Hogan's Heroes (1975–1976)
- How to be a Gentleman
- How We Roll (2022)
- The Jeffersons (1975–1984)
- Jesse (1998–2000)
- Just Shoot Me! (2000–2003)
- Joey (2004–2006)
- Kath & Kim (2008–2009)
- Kevin Can Wait (2016–2018)
- Kids Say the Darndest Things (2019–2020)
- King of the Hill (1997–2009)
- The Little Rascals (1975–1988)
- Love Bites (2011)
- The Love Boat (1977–1987)
- Loving Friends and Perfect Couples (1985)
- Mad About You (1992–2000)
- Mad TV
- Major Dad
- Make Me Laugh
- Malcolm in the Middle (2000–2006)
- Man with a Plan (2016–2020)
- Married... with Children
- Marry Me
- Mary Hartman, Mary Hartman (1976–1977)
- The Mary Tyler Moore Show (1981–1988)
- Maya & Marty (2016)
- Madman of the People (1994–1995)
- The Michael J. Fox Show
- The Millers (2013–2014)
- Modern Family (2019–2020)
- The Monkees (1975–1976)
- Mulaney
- My Name Is Earl (2005–2009)
- Napoleon Dynamite (2012-13)
- NCIS: New Orleans (2014–2021)
- The New Addams Family (1998–2001)
- Ned and Stacey (1995–1997)
- Normal, Ohio (2000)
- Nurses
- The Odd Couple (1975–1977)
- One Day at a Time (1977–1984)
- On the Buses
- Parker Lewis Can't Lose (1990–1993)
- Partners (2014)
- Raising Hope (2010–2011)
- The Red Green Show (1994–1997)
- Rob (2012)
- Sabrina the Teenage Witch (1996–2001)
- Sanford and Son
- Schooled (2019–2020)
- Sean Saves the World
- The Single Guy (1995–1996)
- Seinfeld (1991–1998)
- The Simpsons (1989–2018)
- Single Parents (2019–2020)
- Sit Down, Shut Up (2009)
- Sledge Hammer! (1986–1988)
- Some Mothers Do 'Ave 'Em
- South Park (1997–2001)
- Spin City (2001–2002)
- Stark Raving Mad (1999–2000)
- Stay Tuned (1978–1979)
- Still Standing
- Superstore (2015–2021)
- That '70s Show (1998–2005)
- That Girl (1975–1976)
- The Thing About Pam (2022)
- 'Til Death (2006–2010)
- Titus
- Truth Be Told
- Two Guys and a Girl
- United States of Al (2021–22)
- Wait Till Your Father Gets Home
- The War at Home
- We Are Men (2013)
- Welcome Back, Kotter (1977–1986)
- Welcome to the Family
- Will & Grace (1998–2006; 2017–2020)
- Wings (1990–1997)
- The Winner
- You Again? (1986–1987)

=== Game shows ===
- Are You Smarter Than a Canadian 5th Grader?
- Bumper Stumpers (1987–1994)
- Chain Reaction (1986–1994)
- Deal or No Deal Canada
- Family Feud (1979–1980, 1988–1990)
- Hollywood Squares
- Jackpot
- Jeopardy! (1984–1990) (later aired on CTV from 1990 to 2008, then on CBC from 2008 to 2012)
- The Joker's Wild (1975–1977)
- The Joke's on Us
- The Last Word
- Let's Make a Deal (1981–1987)
- Lingo
- Lotería Loca (2023)
- The New Newlywed Game
- The New Quiz Kids
- Pitfall (1981–1987)
- Superfan (2023)
- The Titan Games (2019–20)
- Wheel of Fortune (1984–1991) (later aired on CTV from 1991 to 2008, then on CBC from 2008 to 2012)
- Who Wants to Be a Millionaire (2019)
- Wipeout (seasons 1 to 5 only; then formerly aired 6–7 by Citytv)

=== Reality/docuseries ===
Canadian series

- Adventures North
- Bake with Anna Olson (reruns; 2020)
- Big Brother Canada (2015–24)
- Big Food Bucket List (reruns)
- BLK, An Origin Story (reruns)
- Bryan Inc. (reruns)
- Buying and Selling (2023)
- Canada Sings (reruns)
- Canadian Country Music Awards
- Canada's Walk of Fame (2009–14; 2017)
- Crime Beat: Most Wanted (2023–24)
- Donut Showdown (reruns)
- Driving Television (2003–19)
- Fire Masters (reruns; 2020–21; 2023–24)
- Fishful Thinking (1990–2024)
- Gemini Awards (2005–06; 2009–2010)
- Great Chocolate Showdown (reruns)
- Holmes Makes It Right (reruns)
- Income Property (2020–23)
- Island of Bryan (reruns)
- Kitchen Nightmares (2007–14)
- Museum Secrets
- My Fabulous Gay Wedding
- Night Walk (AKA Night Ride, Night Music, and Night Moves)
- PowerBoat Television (1990–2021)
- Profiles of Nature
- Recipe to Riches
- Renovation Resort (reruns; 2024)
- Salvage Kings (reruns)
- Sarah's House (reruns)
- Scott's Vacation House Rules (reruns)
- Til Debt Do Us Part
- Trading Up With Mandy Rennehan (reruns)
- Wall of Chefs (reruns)
- Worst to First (reruns)
- You Gotta Eat Here! (reruns)

Acquired programming

- American Dream Builders (March 28 – May 30, 2014)
- The Apprentice
- The Apprentice: Martha Stewart (2005)
- Arrest & Trial (2000–2001)
- Average Joe (2003–2005)
- Better Late Than Never (2016–2018)
- Beyond the Edge (2022)
- The Celebrity Apprentice
- Code 3 (1992–1993)
- Come Dance with Me (2022)
- The Contender (2005)
- COPS (1990–1994)
- Cosmos: A Spacetime Odyssey (2014)
- Divorce Court
- Food for Thought
- Hotel Hell (August 13, 2012 – September 9, 2014)
- Ice Road Truckers (reruns)
- People's Choice Awards
- PokerStars TV
- Popstars
- The Real Love Boat (2022)
- Screen Actors Guild Awards
- Stand Up to Cancer (2010–2016)
- Victoria's Secret Fashion Show

=== Talk shows ===
- 100 Huntley Street (1977–2018)
- The Arsenio Hall Show (1993–1994)
- Context with Lorna Dueck
- The Doctors (2010–2019)
- The Great Debate (1974–1975)
- Hot Ones (2019–2022)
- The Jerry Springer Show
- Karamo (2022–2023)
- The Late Late Show with Craig Ferguson
- The Late Late Show With Craig Kilborn (September 2000 to August 2004, transferred to CH system at a later point)
- Late Night with Conan O'Brien (1993)
- Late Night with David Letterman (1985–1993)
- Leeza
- A Little Late with Lilly Singh (2019–21)
- The Meredith Vieira Show
- The Mike Bullard Show
- The Queen Latifah Show (September 16, 2013–September 5, 2014)
- Rachael Ray (2014–2023)
- Sneaker Shopping (2019–2022)
- The Talk (2010–2024)
- The Test (Sept 2013–May 2014)
- The Tonight Show Starring Johnny Carson
- The Tonight Show with Jay Leno
- TV's Bloopers & Practical Jokes
- Witness to Yesterday (1974)

=== News programming ===
- 16x9 (November 30, 2008 – June 28, 2016)
- 20/20 (1978–2003)
- 60 Minutes More (1999–2000)
- A Current Affair (1993–1996)
- Canada Tonight (2001)
- Entertainment Desk
- Entertainment Tonight Canada (2005–2023)
- Global Sunday (2001–2005)
- The New Reality (2020–2023)
- Science International/What Will They Think of Next! (1976–1979)

=== Sports programming ===
- Canadian Football League (1987–1990)
- ECW on Syfy (2006–2010)
- National Football League (1979–2007)
- National Hockey League (1987–1988)
- PGA Tour
- WWE NXT
- Superstars of Volleyball
- Toronto Blizzard NASL soccer

=== Children's programming ===
Canadian series

- Ace Ventura: Pet Detective (1996–1998)
- The Adventures of Teddy Ruxpin (1987–1997)
- Adventures of the Little Koala (1990–1991)
- Animorphs (1998–2000)
- Astro Boy (1985–1990, 1993–1995)
- Babar (1994–2001)
- Ballooner Landing (1990–1993)
- Beetlejuice (1989–1998)
- The Big Garage (1997–1998, 2000–2001)
- Blazing Dragons (2001–2002)
- Blue Rainbow (1987–2000)
- Care Bears (1986–2001)
- Circle Square (1975–1996)
- C.L.Y.D.E. (1993–1996)
- Commander Crumbcake (1988–1993)
- Dog City (1992–2001)
- Ewoks (1985–1992)
- Fibi's Funny Bones (1999–2001)
- Flash Forward (2000–2002)
- Free Willy (1994–1995)
- Hammy Hamster (1978–1987)
- The KangaZoo Club (1984–1989)
- Kidsbeat (1982–1998)
- Kids Can Rock and Roll (1993–1996)
- Kidstreet (1990–1995)
- Kidsworld (1978–1981)
- Kitty Cats (1993–1997)
- The Little Flying Bears (1993–1995)
- The Mighty Hercules (1979–1991)
- Mr. Wizard's World (1986–1993)
- My Pet Monster (1987–1993)
- The Mystery Files of Shelby Woo (2001–2003)
- The Neverending Story (2000–2002)
- The New Adventures of Pinocchio (1983–1988)
- Ovide and the Gang (1989–1993)
- Prairie Berry Pie (2000–2004)
- Ready or Not (1993–2002)
- Real Kids, Real Adventures (2000–2004)
- Sharky & George (1994–1996)
- The Smoggies (1989–1995)
- Size Small (1982–1993)
- Something Else (1989–1991)
- Star Wars: Droids (1985–1992)
- Strange Days at Blake Holsey High (2002–2006)
- Student Bodies (1997–2001)
- Tales from the Cryptkeeper (1995–1998)
- Tales of the Wizard of Oz (1983–1993)
- Tell-A-Tale Town (1993–2000)
- The Toothbrush Family (1986–1987)
- The Undersea Adventures of Captain Nemo (1983–1988)
- What Will They Think Of Next! (1976–1987)
- Young Robin Hood (1993–1997)

Acquired programming

- The Addams Family (1992–1993)
- All About Us (2001)
- Alvin and the Chipmunks (1983–1990)
- Animaniacs (1993–2000)
- Back to the Future (1991–1993)
- Batman Beyond (1999–2000)
- Battle of the Planets (1978–1984)
- Bill & Ted's Excellent Adventures (1990–1991)
- Bobby's World (1993–1998)
- Bob Morane (2000–2002)
- The Bugs Bunny/Road Runner Show (1978–1982)
- The Bugs Bunny & Tweety Show (1990–2001)
- Bugs 'n' Daffy (1996–1998)
- Captain N and The Adventures of Super Mario Bros. 3 (1990)
- Captain N and the New Super Mario World (1991–1992)
- Casper (1996–1998)
- C Bear and Jamal (1996–1998)
- City Guys (1997–2001)
- COPS (1988–1993)
- Dennis the Menace (1988–1993)
- Digimon: Digital Monsters (2000–2002)
- Droopy, Master Detective (1993–1994)
- Eek! The Cat (1993–1995)
- Eerie, Indiana (1997–1999)
- Eerie, Indiana: The Other Dimension (1998–2001)
- Fraggle Rock: The Animated Series (1987–1988)
- Freakazoid! (1995–1997)
- Godzilla: The Series (1998–2000)
- Hammerman (1991–1992)
- Hang Time (1995–2001)
- Inspector Gadget (1985–2004)
- It's Punky Brewster (1986–1987)
- The Journey of Allen Strange (1998–2001)
- Just Deal (2000)
- Kidd Video (1984–1985)
- Life with Louie (1995–1998)
- The Littles (1984–1985)
- Malibu, CA (1998–2000)
- Men in Black: The Series (1997–2000)
- Mighty Morphin Power Rangers (1993–1994)
- Mister T (1984–1985)
- Jim Henson's Muppet Babies (1991)
- My Little Pony 'n Friends (1986–1988)
- Mystic Knights of Tir Na Nog (1998–1999)
- New Kids on the Block (1990–1991)
- One World (1998–2000)
- Pee-wee's Playhouse (1988–1991)
- The Pink Panther Show (1975–1978)
- Pinky and the Brain (1995–2000)
- The Plucky Duck Show (1992–1993)
- Police Academy (1990)
- ProStars (1991–1992)
- Sailor Moon (1995–1998)
- Saved by the Bell (1993–1999)
- Saved by the Bell: The New Class (1993–2000)
- Slimer! and the Real Ghostbusters (1987–1991)
- Sonic the Hedgehog (1993–1995)
- Space Goofs (1997–1998)
- The Sports Illustrated for Kids Show (1998–2000)
- Superman: The Animated Series (1997–1999)
- The Super Mario Bros. Super Show! (1990–1991)
- The Sylvester & Tweety Mysteries (1995–1998)
- Teenage Mutant Ninja Turtles (1993)
- Tiny Toon Adventures (1990–1997)
- Tom & Jerry Kids (1990–1994)
- Toonsylvania (1998–1999)
- The Weird Al Show (1997–1998)
- Yo, Yogi! (1991–1992)
- Zoo Family (1989–1990)

== See also ==
- Global Television Network
- List of programs broadcast by Global Reality Channel
- Lists of Canadian television series
