= Brighton, Ontario =

Brighton
- Municipality (lower-tier)
- Municipality of Brighton
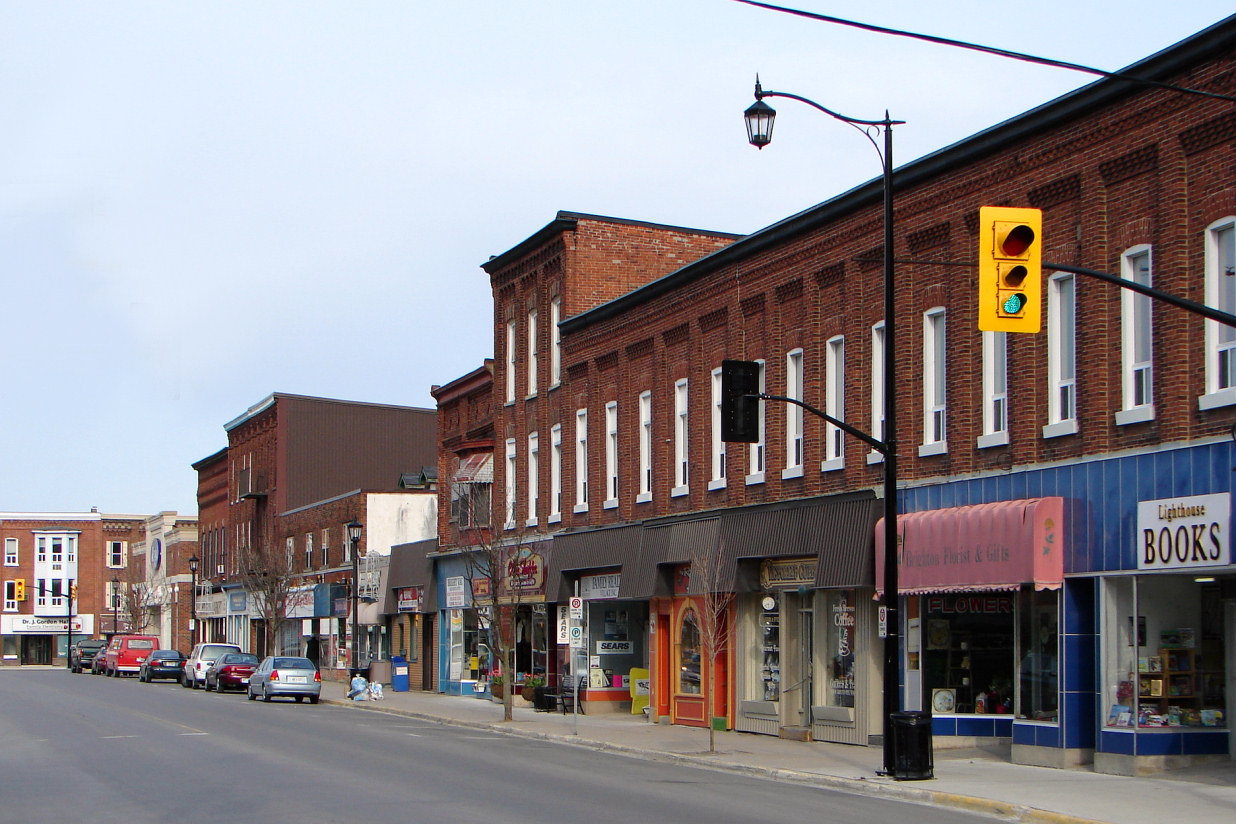
- Motto: Where the past greets the future
- Location within Northumberland County Location within Southern Ontario
- Coordinates: 44°01′51″N 77°43′23″W
- Country: Canada
- Province: Ontario
- County: Northumberland
- Formed: January 1, 2001

Government
  - Mayor: Brian Ostrander
  - Fed. riding: Northumberland—Clarke
  - Prov. riding: Northumberland—Peterborough South

Area
  - Land: 223.24 km^{2} (86.19 sq mi)
  - Urban: 7.02 km^{2} (2.71 sq mi)

Population (2021)
  - Total: 12,108
  - Density: 54.2/km^{2} (140/sq mi)
  - Urban: 5,847
  - Urban density: 833.2/km^{2} (2,158/sq mi)
- Time zone: UTC-5 (EST)
  - Summer (DST): UTC-4 (EDT)
- Postal Code: K0K 1H0
- Area code: 613
- Website: www.brighton.ca

Brighton is a municipality in Northumberland County, Ontario, Canada, approximately 150 kilometres (93 mi) east of Toronto and 100 km (62 mi) west of Kingston. It is traversed by both Highway 401 and the former Highway 2. The west end of the Murray Canal that leads east to the Bay of Quinte is at the east end of the town.

It is home to over 12,108 inhabitants, with a higher than average percentage of those retired.

Presqu'ile Provincial Park, just south of the town centre, is one of Brighton's most popular attractions. The park is notable for bird-watching and other nature-oriented activities. Memory Junction Railway Museum, located in a former Grand Trunk station, had a collection of rail equipment and memorabilia but is currently closed. In late September, Brighton is host to Applefest, its largest yearly festival.

== Geography ==
=== Communities ===
Besides the town proper of Brighton, the municipality of Brighton comprises a number of villages and hamlets, including the following communities:

- Carman
- Codrington
- Hilton
- Spring Valley
- Smithfield (partially)
- Butler Creek
- Cankerville
- Cedar Creek
- Gosport
- Orland
- Presqui'le Point
- Wade Corners
- Edville

=== Artificial island area of Brighton ===
Part of the current Municipality of Brighton is on a separate artificial island. This is a consequence of the borders chosen when the Township of Brighton was created in 1851, and the excavation of the Murray Canal across the Isthmus of Murray. The Murray Canal opened in 1889.

== History ==
Brighton was incorporated as a village on January 1, 1859. On December 1, 1980, it became a town.

The original Simpson house, at 61 Simpson Street, was built in 1850. Brighton developed primarily into an agricultural community, specializing in the farming of apples and production of new apple types. However, in recent years, many of the original orchards in the area have been partially removed, to make way for the steadily growing population, and more profitable agricultural produce, such as wheat, corn and soybeans.

On January 1, 2001, the current Municipality of Brighton was formed through an amalgamation of the former Town of Brighton and Brighton Township.

== Demographics ==
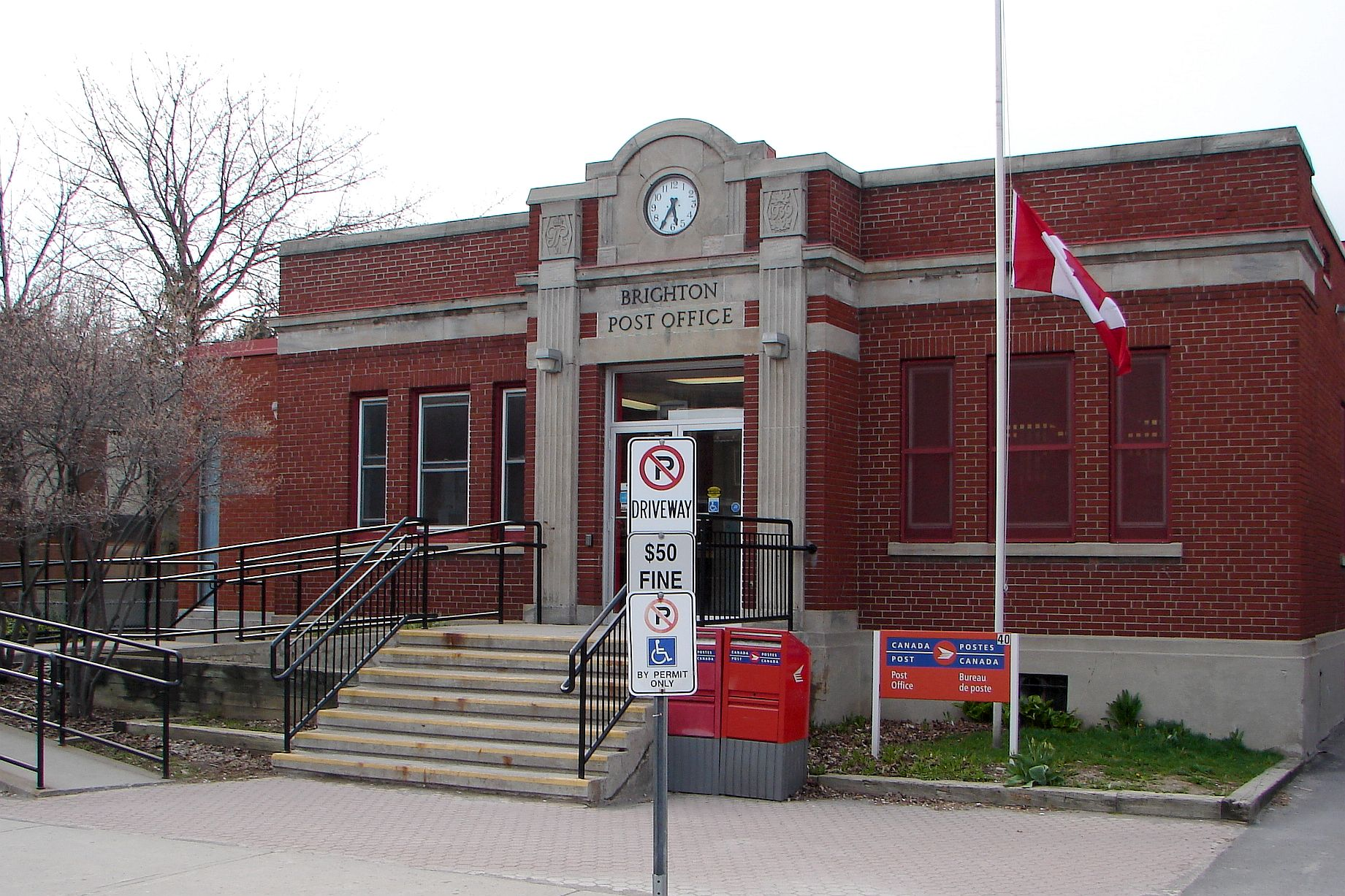
Post office

In the 2021 Census of Population conducted by Statistics Canada, Brighton had a population of 12,108 living in 5,014 of its 5,392 total private dwellings, a change of 2.2% from its 2016 population of 11,844. With a land area of 223.24 km^{2} (86.19 sq mi), it had a population density of 54.2/km^{2} (140.5/sq mi) in 2021.

Canada census – Brighton community profile

	2021	2016	2011
Population	12,108 (+2.2% from 2016)	11,844 (+8.4% from 2011)	10,928 (+6.6% from 2006)
Land area	223.24 km^{2} (86.19 sq mi)	222.71 km^{2} (85.99 sq mi)	222.76 km^{2} (86.01 sq mi)
Population density	54.2/km^{2} (140/sq mi)	53.2/km^{2} (138/sq mi)	49.1/km^{2} (127/sq mi)
Median age	56.0 (M: 53.6, F: 58.0)	52.8 (M: 51.2, F: 54.3)
Private dwellings	5,392 (total) 5,014 (occupied)	5,099 (total)	4,825 (total)
Median household income	$81,000	$68,683

References: 2021 2016 2011

Historical census populations – Municipality of Brighton
Year	Pop.	±%
2001	9,449	—
2006	10,253	+8.5%
2011	10,928	+6.6%
2016	11,844	+8.4%
2021	12,108	+2.2%
Source: Statistics Canada

Historical census populations – Brighton Town

Year	Pop.	±%
1871	1,357	—
1881	1,547	+14.0%
1891	1,479	−4.4%
1901	1,378	−6.8%
1911	1,320	−4.2%
1921	1,411	+6.9%

Year	Pop.	±%
1931	1,580	+12.0%
1941	1,651	+4.5%
1951	1,967	+19.1%
1956	2,182	+10.9%
1961	2,403	+10.1%
1966	2,766	+15.1%

Year	Pop.	±%
1971	2,956	+6.9%
1976	3,199	+8.2%
1981	3,147	−1.6%
1986	3,595	+14.2%
1991	4,366	+21.4%
1996	4,584	+5.0%

Source: Statistics Canada

Historical census populations – Brighton Township

Year	Pop.	±%
1871	3,734	—
1881	3,470	−7.1%
1891	3,017	−13.1%
1901	2,774	−8.1%
1911	2,439	−12.1%
1921	2,247	−7.9%

Year	Pop.	±%
1931	2,244	−0.1%
1941	1,961	−12.6%
1951	2,051	+4.6%
1956	2,352	+14.7%
1961	2,451	+4.2%
1966	2,456	+0.2%

Year	Pop.	±%
1971	2,935	+19.5%
1976	3,133	+6.7%
1981	3,230	+3.1%
1986	3,556	+10.1%
1991	4,115	+15.7%
1996	4,438	+7.8%

Source: Statistics Canada

== Media ==
- Brighton Independent (Metroland Media Group)
- Oldies 100.9 (My Broadcasting)
- Edville Gazette (Independently Published)

== Notable residents ==
- Eddie Hayward, racehorse trainer who won the Kentucky Derby
- Mark Kellogg, Associated Press correspondent killed at the Battle of the Little Bighorn
- Gail Vaz-Oxlade, financial writer and television personality. Host of the Slice series Til Debt Do Us Part and Princess.

== See also ==
- List of townships in Ontario
