= Money Moron =

- Presented by: Gail Vaz-Oxlade
- Country of origin: Canada
- Original language: English
- No. of episodes: 24

Production
- Producer: Peacock Alley Entertainment
- Running time: 30 minutes (including commercials)

Original release
- Network: Slice
- Release: April 18 – October 7, 2013

Money Moron is a Canadian television series hosted by Gail Vaz-Oxlade. Similar to her first two shows, Til Debt Do Us Part and Prince$$, Vaz-Oxlade helps people with money and debt problems. In Money Moron, a "moron" is nominated by someone to get help to be more financially responsible. If they follow through and do all of the challenges Vaz-Oxlade gives them, they will receive up to $10,000. The purpose is not just to solve their money problems but to heal the relationship between the person nominated and the one who nominated them.

== Episodes ==
Season 1:

№	Title	Airdate	Short Plot Summary
1	"Deanna & James"	April 19, 2013	A woman is concerned for her fiancé, an actor who spends recklessly despite his low income and high debt, in the premiere of this series in which financial expert Gail Vaz-Oxlade helps people who are experiencing problems with money in their relationships.
2	"Laura & Sean"	April 19, 2013	A wife wants more responsibility for the finances in her marriage.
3	"Kat & Josh"	April 26, 2013	The host helps a couple who are experiencing tension in their relationship.
4	"Ryan & Lisetti"	April 26, 2013	A newlywed couple who are expecting a baby need help with their spending habits.
5	"Will & Leah"	May 3, 2013	A woman seeks intervention for her fiancé's spending habits, but she has financial problems of her own.
6	"Anne & Michael"	May 3, 2013	A man's spending habits threaten his upcoming marriage.
7	"Courtney & Dylan"	May 11, 2013	A man wants a second baby, but his wife feels he's too immature to handle one.
8	"Mike & Kelly"	May 11, 2013	A man is envious of his wife's income and her spending habits.
9	"Anthony & Tamara"	May 18, 2013	A man worries that his wife's spending habits will prevent them from being able to buy a house.
10	"Robert & Tammy"	May 18, 2013	A couple with three children struggle with financial problems.

Season 2:

№	Title	Airdate	Short Plot Summary
1	"Dan & Alison"	August 27, 2013	In the Season 2 premiere, a man and his pregnant wife are forced to move back in with his mother due to reckless spending.
2	"Mike & Celeste"	August 27, 2013	A man's quest for possessions has landed his family in debt.
3	"Chris & Jessica"	September 3, 2013	A mother keeps her out-of-control spending habits a secret from her husband.
4	"Bryan & Jennifer"	September 3, 2013	A mother is fed up with her partner's reckless spending habits.
5	"Dan & Lisa"	September 10, 2013	A man runs up high credit balances while keeping his wife on a strict allowance.
6	"Valerie, Kyla & Conor"	September 10, 2013	A woman spends too much on her children.
7	"Matt, Alanna & Cathy"	September 17, 2013	A woman lives in her mom's basement with her husband.
8	"Roy & Kristoffer"	September 17, 2013	A man taps into his partner's resources to fund his magic business.
9	"Chris & Nicole"	September 24, 2013	A woman taps into her father's retirements savings in order to splurge on herself and her daughter.
10	"Kris & April"	September 24, 2013	A man is concerned about his wife's habit of spending above their means.
11	"Matt & Jennifer"	September 30, 2013	A man fears that his pregnant wife's spending sprees will leave nothing for the baby.
12	"David & April"	September 30, 2013	A man spoils his children and lives beyond his means, and his partner is ready to leave.
13	"Mike & Lisa"	October 7, 2013	A man spends recklessly but his pregnant partner is putting her foot down.
14	"John & Rachel"	October 7, 2013	A woman's constant borrowing has driven her entire family away, except her brother.
