= Thunderbird Entertainment =

Canadian film and television company

Thunderbird Entertainment, Inc.
- Formerly: Thunderbird Entertainment; Thunderbird Films
- Type: Public
- Traded as: TSXV: TBRD
- Industry: Film; Television
- Founded: 2003; 23 years ago
- Defunct: February 2026; 9 months ago
- Fate: Acquired by Blue Ant Media and folded into Blue Ant Studios.
- Headquarters: Vancouver, British Columbia; Toronto, Ontario; Los Angeles, California; Ottawa, Ontario
- Key people: Jennifer Twiner McCarron (president, CEO, and Director); Barb Harwood (CFO); Matthew Berkowitz (CCO); Richard Goldsmith (president, Global Distribution, and Consumer Products); Sarah Nathanson (general counsel)
- Products: Television series Television films
- Revenue: ▲$81.3 million (2020)
- Number of employees: 1,000 (2018)
- Subsidiaries: Atomic Cartoons; Great Pacific Media
- Website: thunderbird.tv

Thunderbird Entertainment, Inc. was a television and animation production company headquartered in Vancouver, British Columbia. Founded in 2003 as Thunderbird Films, it produces scripted, unscripted, and animated programming for domestic and international broadcasters and streaming platforms.

With offices in Toronto, Los Angeles and Ottawa, the firm operated several subsidiaries, including Atomic Cartoons, Great Pacific Media, and Thunderbird Releasing.

On November 26, 2025, Blue Ant Media announced that it would acquire Thunderbird for $63 million; the acquisition was completed in January 2026, after which Thunderbird and its divisions were folded into Blue Ant Studios.

== History ==
Tim Gamble and Michael Shepard founded the company in 2003 as Thunderbird Films. In its early years, it focused on television production and international distribution of Canadian programming.

In 2012, after receiving an investment from Lionsgate founder Frank Giustra, Thunderbird formed a joint venture with Lionsgate known as Sea to Sky Entertainment (named after the "Sea-to-Sky" stretch of BC's Highway 99, just as Lionsgate was named after Vancouver's Lions Gate Bridge). The venture made deals with director-producer R.J. Cutler and author Dennis Lehane.

In April 2013, Thunderbird acquired Reunion Pictures, producer of Alice and Continuum. In September 2014, the firm acquired the British independent film distributor Soda Pictures.

In December 2014, Thunderbird purchased Vancouver-based reality television studio Great Pacific Media (GPM), producer of the Discovery Channel Canada series Highway Thru Hell. GPM continued to operate as a subsidiary of Thunderbird, and its co-founder Mark Miller was promoted to co-president of Thunderbird in 2016.

In July 2015, Thunderbird acquired Vancouver-based animation studio Atomic Cartoons; its CEO Jennifer Twiner McCarron was promoted to president of Thunderbird in 2018. In August 2018, it was announced that Thunderbird would go public on the TSX Venture Exchange through a reverse takeover by Golden Secret Ventures.

In January 2021, Thunderbird Entertainment named Richard Goldsmith, formerly of Cyber Group Studios, as its first president of global distribution and consumer products. In September, Voss Capital acquired a 10.5% stake in Thunderbird.

On November 26, 2025, Blue Ant Media announced its intent to acquire Thunderbird for $63 million. The transaction was completed on January 28, 2026; in February 2026, Thunderbird was folded into Blue Ant Studios as part of a subsequent reorganization, with Great Pacific Media being folded into Blue Ant Media's unscripted division and closed, and Atomic Cartoons being placed alongside Jam Filled Entertainment in a new kids & family division led by McCarron.

== Assets ==
=== Atomic Cartoons ===
Atomic Cartoons is a Vancouver-based animation studio acquired by Thunderbird in 2015. It has produced series such as Atomic Betty, Beat Bugs (with Beyond International), The Last Kids on Earth, Mighty Express (with Spin Master), Molly of Denali (with the CBC and WGBH for PBS Kids and CBC Kids), and Pirate Express.

=== Great Pacific Media ===
Great Pacific Media (GPM) was founded in May 2010 by Blair Reekie and Mark Miller. Acquired by Thunderbird in December 2014, the studio focuses primarily on reality television, having produced series such as Highway Thru Hell and its Ontario-based spin-off Heavy Rescue: 401 for Discovery Channel (now USA Network), Save My Reno and Worst to First for HGTV (now Home Network), and Queen of the Oil Patch for APTN.

In 2016, while remaining as CEO of GPM following its acquisition, Miller was appointed co-president of Thunderbird. In 2019, three years after former Bell Media executive Paul Lewis was appointed president of GPM, Wendy McKernan was named its vice president, while Lindsay Macadam (Motive) became head of a new scripted division that would focus on dramatizations of real events.

In 2020, it was reported that Simon Barry and GPM were developing a biographical drama based on Wernher von Braun, adapted from Michael J. Neufeld's biography Von Braun: Dreamer of Space, Engineer of War.

=== Thunderbird Releasing ===
Thunderbird Releasing (formerly Soda Pictures) is a British film distributor formed in 2002 by Eve Gabereau and Edward Fletcher. Primarily focused on independent and arthouse films, it was acquired by Thunderbird Entertainment in 2014 and renamed Thunderbird Releasing three years later.

== Filmography ==
=== Scripted television series ===
Title	Years	Network	Seasons	Episodes	Notes
Cold Squad	1998–2005	CTV	7	98	Canadian police procedural drama
Da Vinci's Inquest	1998–2005	CBC	7	91	Crime drama series
Zixx	2004–2009	YTV	3	39	co-production with Mainframe Entertainment and The Nightingale Company
Da Vinci's City Hall	2005–2006	CBC	1	13	Spin-off of Da Vinci's Inquest
Zigby	2009–2011	Treehouse TV; ABC Kids (Australia); ZDF (Germany)	1	52	co-production with Flying Bark Productions, Avrill Stark Entertainment and Big Animation
Guilt	2016	Freeform	1	10	American adaptation of the Dutch series Overspel
Hiccups	2010–2012	CTV	2	26	Sitcom starring Nancy Robertson
Mr. Young	2011–2013	YTV; Disney XD (International)	3	80	co-production with Gravy Boat Productions
Endgame	2011	Showcase	1	13	co-production with Front Street Pictures
Package Deal	2013–2014	Citytv	2	26	Multi-camera sitcom
Some Assembly Required	2014–2016	YTV	3	58	co-production with Gravy Boat Productions and Remotey Funny Productions
Stone Undercover	2002–2004	CBC Television	2	26	Police drama series
Kim's Convenience	2016–2021	CBC	5	65	co-production with Soulpepper Theatre Company
Somewhere Between	2017	ABC	1	10	Thriller series based on the South Korean drama God’s Gift: 14 Days

=== Factual TV series ===
- 1800 Seconds: Chasing Canada's Snowbirds
- Air Dogs
- Airshow
- Animal Miracles with Alan Thicke
- Bulging Brides
- Campus Vets
- Confessions: Animal Hoarding
- Daily Planet - Segments
- Game of Homes
- Heroines
- Industrious
- The Last 10 Pounds Bootcamp
- Makeover Wish
- Megaroof: Rebuilding BC Place
- Miss Landmine
- The Mistress
- Model Killers
- Monster Quake: Chile
- Monster Quake: Japan
- My Evil Sister
- Peak to Peak
- Prisoners of Age
- Raising Big Blue
- Scared of my Shadow
- Untold Stories of the ER

=== Animated series ===
- 101 Dalmatian Street
- Beat Bugs
- Ella the Elephant
- Johnny Test
- The Last Kids on Earth
- Lego Jurassic World: The Secret Exhibit
- Little Charmers
- Marvel's Avengers Assemble
- Max & Ruby
- Maya the Bee
- Milo vs ALEX!
- Minecraft Mini-Series
- Mixels
- Nico Can Dance!
- Pirate Express
- Rocket Monkeys
- Spider-Man Unlimited
- Super Dinosaur
- Transformers: Rescue Bots
- World of Quest
- Zigby
- Zixx
