= Animals at Work =

British-Canadian television series

Animals at Work, also called Frisky Business, is a British-Canadian children's television series presented by John Barrowman on CBBC. CBBC from 2009-2011 and Series 1-4., Discovery Channel, and Primo TV. Each episode features 3 or 4 animals in different parts of the world that do weird jobs.

Episode Transmission Dates:

Series 1–26 January 2009 to 16 February 2009 CBBC Channel

Series 2–8 to 29 June 2009 CBBC Channel

Series 3–22 July 2010 to 7 October 2010 CBBC on BBC1

Series 4–9 June 2011 to 11 August 2011 CBBC Channel

== Legal conflict ==
In 2012, Merrily Weisbord, who originated the show Dogs with Jobs, sued Cineflix and series producer Glen Salzman in Quebec Superior Court for $400,000 over Animals at Work. Weisbord alleged that the program was a knockoff or sequel of Dogs with Jobs, having the same structure and featuring at least 15 of the same dogs.
