= Kevin Frank =

Canadian actor (born 1957)

- Born: Kevin Walter Frank; January 13, 1957 (age 69); Welland, Ontario, Canada
- Occupations: Actor; comedian; musician; director; television host; writer
- Years active: 1984–present
- Children: 2
- Website: www.kevinwfrank.com

Kevin Walter Frank (born January 13, 1957) is a Canadian actor, comedian, musician, director, television host and writer. He is best known as the host of television game shows The Next Line and Kidstreet, as well as producing and hosting the Animal Planet series Pet Project.

Outside of acting, Frank is also works as a musician playing drums with his improv comedy music group, Glendale One.

== Personal life ==
Frank resides in Toronto, Ontario, Canada with his partner and their two daughters.

== Filmography ==
=== Film ===
Year	Title	Role	Notes
1996	Getting Away with Murder	Martys Party Guest #2	
1998	The Marriage Fool	James Walsh	
1999	Toy Soldiers	Brian	
2000	Thomas and the Magic Railroad	Henry, Dodge, Bertie, Harold and Sir Topham Hatt (voices)	Also creative consultant
2006	Lady in the Water	Silvertide Band Member	

=== Television ===
Year	Title	Role	Notes
1987–1992	Kidstreet	Host	Game Show; 350 episodes
1988	War of the Worlds	Gabriel	Unknown episodes
1989	Street Legal	Lorne Masters	Episode: "Basketball Story"
1990	Top Cops	Postal Van Driver	Unknown episodes
1990	Clarence	Brimmer's Programmer	Television film
1991–1992	The Next Line	Host	Game Show
1992	The Red Green Show	Noel Christmas	9 episodes
1994	Boogies Diner	Delivery Guy	1 episode
1994	Due South	Animal Control Officer	Episode: "Diefenbaker's Day Off"
1994	The Mighty Jungle	Patient	Episode: "Winston on the Town"
1996	Pet Project	Kevin	Host, writer, director (78 episodes)
1999	Twice in a Lifetime	MC	Episode: "A Match Made in Heaven"
2004	The Newsroom	Morning Talk Show Chef	Episode: "America, America"
2007	Grossology	Spew Hurley (voice)	Episode: "Heave It or Leave it"
2020	The Search for Canada's Game Shows	Himself	Television Documentary; Episode: "When The West Was Best"

== Production credits ==
Year	Title	Position	Notes
2008	Facebook of Revelations: Robots	Artistic director	Television short
2008	Facebook of Revelations: Puppy	Artistic director	Television short
2008	Facebook of Revelations: Jesus 2.0	Artistic director	Television short
2008	Facebook of Revelations: Heroes	Artistic director	Television short
