= K95 =

K95 or K-95 may refer to:

- K-95 (Kansas highway), a highway in Kansas
- K-95, a rating for ski jumping hills indicating a construction point of 95
- K95 FM, radio station
- K. 95, a Mozart symphony

== See also ==
- K-9 to 5
