= List of programs broadcast by Global Reality Channel =

This is a list of programs broadcast by Global Reality Channel, a defunct Canadian English language Category B specialty channel owned by Shaw Media. The channel broadcast reality television series and related programming.

== Past programming ==
- The Apprentice (UK)
- Are You Smarter Than a Canadian 5th Grader?
- Big Brother
- Big Brother After Dark
- Bridezillas
- Cake Walk
- Canada Sings
- Dinner Party Wars
- Fear Factor
- From the Ground Up
- Hell's Kitchen
- Hoarders
- Intervention Canada
- Kitchen Nightmares
- The Last 10 Pounds Bootcamp
- Mob Wives
- Party Mamas
- The Real Housewives of Atlanta
- The Real Housewives of New Jersey
- The Real Housewives of New York City
- Reality Obsessed
- Rehab at the Hard Rock
- Restaurant Makeover
- Survivor
- Top Chef Canada
- Tori & Dean: Home Sweet Hollywood
- Total Wipeout
- TV with TV's Jonathan Torrens
- Wedding Wars
- Wipeout Canada
- X-Weighted

== See also ==
- List of programs broadcast by Global
- Global Reality Channel
- Global Television Network
