= Gail Vaz-Oxlade =

Jamaican-Canadian financial writer and television personality

- Born: Gail Vaz; June 18, 1959 (age 66); Jamaica
- Occupations: Financial writer, television host

Gail Vaz-Oxlade (born June 18, 1959) is a Jamaican-Canadian financial writer and television personality. Vaz-Oxlade hosts the Canadian television series Til Debt Do Us Part, Princess and, most recently, Money Moron. Vaz-Oxlade is also a regular columnist for Yahoo! Canada Finance. Previously, she was a regular feature writer for The Globe and Mail, Chatelaine magazine, IE: Money and MoneySense.ca, among others. Gail most recently ventured into the divorce realm by offering financially based divorce services through The Common Sense Divorce.

== Career ==
Vaz-Oxlade began her career after moving to Canada, working as an administrative assistant and later taking a job in marketing. In that role she was asked by a banking client to write a manual for its employees on its Registered Retirement Savings Plan products, which grew into Vaz-Oxlade writing all of the bank's technical materials. Within a number of years, Vaz-Oxlade began freelance writing, ultimately writing 27 columns every month.

Citing burn-out, Vaz-Oxlade quit and moved to Brighton, Ontario with her family and over a two-year period did volunteer work and raised her family. After that time, she was asked by a production company to host Til Debt Do Us Part. In her role on that show, Vaz-Oxlade describes herself as a "super nanny for money". After seven seasons of hosting the program, Vaz-Oxlade agreed to continue with the show if the network, Slice, allowed her to do a new show. The network agreed, resulting in the creation of Princess, which focuses on young women rather than couples.

In 2011, Vaz-Oxlade began a campaign advocating for changes in the way lenders assess lending criteria, particularly for credit cards. As part of that effort, Vaz-Oxlade urged Canadian consumers to stop using their credit cards for one week and pay cash only; as well, she urged Canadians to write to their Members of Parliament to urge changes in legislation restricting the use of credit scores in the granting of credit.

== Personal life ==
Born Gail Elizabeth Theresa Vaz to a wealthy family in Jamaica, Vaz-Oxlade emigrated to Canada with her family in 1977. Her surname is the result of hyphenating her maiden name and her first husband's surname. She has been married three times: the first marriage lasted one year; the second lasted nine years; and the third lasted eighteen years. However, Vaz-Oxlade, in a money-saving endeavour, has not divorced her last husband. Rather, they are legally separated. Vaz-Oxlade has two children, Alexandra (Alex) Kaitlin Prue and Malcolm Kenneth Prue.

== Books ==
Vaz-Oxlade has written numerous books, including:

- The RRSP Answer Book (Stoddart annually 1991–1998)
- The Borrower's Answer Book (Stoddart 1993)
- The Retirement Answer Book (Stoddart 1994,1996,1997)
- Shopping for Money: Strategies for Successful Borrowing (Stoddart 1992, 1999)
- The Money Tree Myth: A Parents Guide to Helping Kids Unravel the Mysteries of Money (Stoddart 1993,1996)
- A Woman of Independent Means: A Woman's Guide to Full Financial Security (Stoddart 1999)
- Dead Cat Bounce: The Skinny of E-Vesting (Prentice Hall 2001)
- Divorce: A Canadian Woman's Guide (Prentice Hall 2002)
- Education Planning (CCH Canadian 1999)
- Debt-Free Forever:Take Control of Your Money and Your Life (HarperCollins 2009)
- Never Too Late: Take Control of Your Retirement and Your Future (HarperCollins 2010)
- Debt-Free Forever:Take Control of Your Money and Your Life US Edition (Experiment 2010)
- Easy Money (Grass Roots Press 2011)
- Money-Smart Kids (HarperCollins 2011)
- It's Your Money: Becoming a Woman of Independent Means (HarperCollins 2011)
- Money Rules: Rule Your Money, Or Your Money Will Rule You (HarperCollins 2012)
- Saving for School: Understand RESPs, Take Control of Your Savings, Minimize Student Debt (HarperCollins 2013)
- Never Too Late: Take Control of Your Retirement and Your Future Revised Edition (HarperCollins 2013)
- Money Talks: When to Say Yes and How to Say No (2015)
