= Twist (TV network) =

American digital multicast television network

- Type: Digital multicast television network
- Country: United States
- Broadcast area: Nationwide via OTA digital television
- Headquarters: Atlanta, Georgia

Programming
- Picture format: 480i (SDTV); presented in 16:9 widescreen or 4:3 letterbox depending on affiliate

Ownership
- Owner: Tegna Inc.
- Key people: Brian Weiss; (President/General Manager)

History
- Founded: February 24, 2021; 5 years ago
- Launched: April 5, 2021; 5 years ago
- Closed: December 31, 2023; 2 years ago

Links
- Website: watchtwist.com

Twist was an American digital multicast television network owned by Tegna Inc. Launched on April 5, 2021, the network specializes in factual lifestyle and reality television content aimed at women between the ages of 25 and 54, sourcing its programs from the archives of NBCUniversal Television and Streaming, with its name coming from the common reality show "twist" in an overall narrative. The network was available in many media markets via the digital subchannels of over-the-air television stations, and on select cable and Internet Protocol television providers in certain markets through local affiliates of the network.

== History ==
Twist was announced on February 24, 2021. The network was given an expected launch date of April 2021. Tegna tapped several of its 46 owned or operated television stations to serve as the network's charter affiliates, in exchange for maintaining a minority ownership stake in the network.

In November 2023, Tegna announced that Twist would shut down on December 31, 2023.

== Programming ==
Twist's lineup of programming includes:

- Candice Tells All
- Cash and Cari
- Clean House
- Clean House Comes Clean
- Dance Moms
- Decked Out
- Dr. 90210
- Fearless in the Kitchen
- Flipping Out
- For Better or for Worse
- For Rent
- It's Just Food
- My Floating Home
- Paranormal Survivor
- Queer Eye for the Straight Guy
- Secrets, Lies, and DNA Ties
- The Science Zone
- Tabatha Takes Over
- Tabatha's Salon Takeover
- The Unsellables
- What's For Sale?

== Affiliates ==
Twist was mostly affiliated with Tegna, Innovate Corp. and Univision/UniMás owned and operated stations around the country.
