= Tom Europe =

Canadian actor (born 1970)

Tommy Europe
No. 13
- Position: Defensive back

Personal information
- Born: July 27, 1970 (age 56); Toronto, Ontario, Canada

Career information
- University: Bishop's
- CFL draft: 1993: 2nd round, 7th overall pick

Career history
- 1993–1996: BC Lions
- 1997–1998: Montreal Alouettes
- 1999–2003: Winnipeg Blue Bombers

Awards and highlights
- Grey Cup champion (1994); 2× CFL West All-Star (1995, 2002)

Career CFL statistics
- Tackles: 483
- Interceptions: 21
- Fumble returns: 12
- Games played: 175

Tommy Europe (born July 27, 1970) is a Canadian actor, stunt man, professional trainer and former professional football defensive back who played eleven seasons in the Canadian Football League (CFL). He played college football at Bishop's University.

== Professional career ==
=== BC Lions (1993–1996) ===
Europe was selected in the second round (7th overall) of the 1993 CFL draft by the BC Lions.

As a rookie in 1993, Europe appeared in all 18 games for the Lions. In 1994, he appeared in all 18 games. The Lions won the 82nd Grey Cup in 1994. In 1995, he again appeared in all 18 games for the Lions. In 1996, his final season with the BC Lions, Europe again appeared in all 18 regular season games.

=== Montreal Alouettes (1997–1998) ===
In 1997, Europe joined the Montreal Alouettes. During his first season with the Alouettes he appeared in only nine games. In 1998 he appeared in 15 games.

=== Winnipeg Blue Bombers (1999–2003) ===
After spending two seasons with the Montreal Alouettes, neither of which were full 18 game seasons, Europe joined the Winnipeg Blue Bombers. During his first season with the Blue Bombers, he appeared in 18 games. For the 2000 season, he appeared in 17 games. In 2001, he appeared again in a full 18 game season. The 2002 season would be Europe's final full season playing professional football, appearing in all 18 games. The 2003 season would be his final season playing football. He appeared in only eight games.

After the 2003 season, at the age of 33, Europe retired due to nagging injuries. In his five seasons with the Winnipeg Blue Bombers, he recorded 483 defensive tackles, 21 interceptions and 12 fumble returns.

== Post-football career ==
Europe is the owner of TommyEurope.tv, an online fitness community that has videos, social networking, E-Books, meal plans and fitness programs. In 2009 he released his Target Training Series of E-Books. He was voted BEST personal trainer in The Georgia Straight, Best of Vancouver readers poll for 2006, 2007, and 2009. His book The 10-Pound Shred: From Flab to Fit in 4 Weeks was published by HarperCollins Canada in 2011. He currently stars on the Slice reality show The Last 10 Pounds Bootcamp and Bulging Brides, working as a personal trainer and fitness coach who helps participants lose weight for an upcoming special event.

He is also an actor and stuntman.

== Filmography ==
Year	Title	Role	Notes
2006	Scary Movie 4	Stunt performer	
2006	Little Man	Stunt double: Shawn Wayans	
2006	Stargate Atlantis	Stunt performer (uncredited)	Episode "Sateda"
2006	Stargate SG-1	Stunt performer (uncredited)	Episode "200"
2006	Battlestar Galactica	Stunt double (uncredited)	Episode "Hero"
2006	The Hard Corps	Minion #2/Stunt performer (uncredited)	
2006-2015	Supernatural	Stunt performer/stunt double	Episodes "Out of the Darkness, Into the Fire", "Death's Door", "Dead Men Don't Wear Plaid", "The Magnificent Seven", "Bloodlust"
2006-2007	The 4400	Stunt performer	Episodes "The Homefront" and "Try the Pie"
2007	White Noise: The Light	Stunt performer	
2007	Shooter	Stunt performer	
2007	Blood Ties	Jean-Marc/Stunt performer	Episode "Bad Juju"
2007	Painkiller Jane	Munitions guard	Episode "Toy Soldiers"
2007	Psych	Kelly	Episode "Zero to Murder in Sixty Seconds"
2007	Smallville	Stunt Performer	Episode "Progeny"
2007	Postal	Stunt performer	
2007-2012	The Last 10 Pounds Bootcamp	Host	
2008	Vice	Stunts	
2008	Stargate Continuum	Stunts	Direct-to-DVD film
2009	Battlestar Galactica: The Plan	Rally	TV movie
2009-2010	Bulging Brides	Host	
2010	The 12th Annual Leo Awards	Himself	Nominee: Best Host in an Information or Lifestyle Series
2010	Human Target	Stunt performer	Episode "Corner Man"
2010-2011	V	Stunt double/Stunts	Episodes "Red Rain", "Heretic's Fork" and "John May"
2011	True Justice	Stunt performer/Fighter #2 ("Brotherhood Part 2")	Episodes "Brotherhood Part 2" and "Yakuza"
2011	Chaos	Police Man	Episode "Pilot"
2011	Urban Rush	Himself	Episode dated March 3, 2011
2011	The Marilyn Denis Show	Himself	Episode 147
2012	Hell on Wheels	Stunt performer	Episode "Scabs"
2012	Alcatraz	Stunt double	Episode "Clarence Montgomery"
2012	Halo 4: Forward Unto Dawn	Marine	Parts 1-5
2013	Vendetta	Stunts	
2013-2014	Arrow	Prison Guard/Security Guard/Stunts	Episodes "Darkness on the Edge of Town", "The Man Under the Hood", "Suicide Squad", "The Promise" and "Tremors"
2014	The Flash	Stunt performer	Episodes "Fastest Man Alive" and "Crazy for You"
2015	Gears of War: Ultimate Edition	Motion capture Performer	Video game
2015	Proof	Frank McNeil	Episode "Redemption"
2016	Lucifer	Stunt double/stunt performer	Episodes "Take Me Back to Hell", "Pops", "Manly Whatnots", "The Would-Be Prince of Darkness"
2016	iZombie	Stunt double	Episode "Fifty Shades of Grey Matter"
2016	Deadpool	Stunt performer	
2016	Legends of Tomorrow	Bouncer #1	Episode "Blood Ties"
2016	Love on the Sideline	Isaiah Howards	TV movie
2019	Playing with Fire	Burly Smoke Jumper #2	
