= Human Prey =

- Narrated by: Michael Allcock
- Composers: Walter Rathie; Larry Hopkins
- Countries of origin: United States; Canada
- Original language: English

Production
- Executive producers: Nick Godwin; Ian Holt
- Production companies: Cineflix; Nextfilm Productions

Original release
- Network: Animal Planet Canada (Canada); Animal Planet (United States)
- Release: January 21, 2009 – 2009

I Was Prey also known as Human Prey is a 2009 Canadian single-season television series produced by Cineflix and aired on Animal Planet. The series features episodes where human beings end up as easy prey for animals, carnivorous or herbivorous.

== Episodes ==
=== Killers on the Loose ===
Gary Brown's visit to an African chimp sanctuary becomes a deadly struggle when he and his guide are attacked by the colony's escaped alpha male. A 'Feast for the Beast' fundraiser held at a zoo in Idaho takes a bloody turn when a 600-pound Siberian tiger breaks free and pursues one of the organisers, catches and attacks them, with the organiser sustaining a serious injury to their hip when a police officer tasked with scaring the big cat off accidentally shoots them instead. Finally, a police officer stares down an angry bull when the animal escapes from a 'bloodless' Massachusetts bullfight and goes on a rampage.

- Chimpanzee (Pan troglodytes)
- Siberian tiger (Panthera tigris tigris)
- Bull (Bos taurus)

=== Killers of the Savannah ===
A conservationist faces an aggressive lion. Camping without a tent during his kayak holiday on the Zambezi River, a pilot is attacked by a hungry hyena as he sleeps. A rogue lioness hunts down a game warden.

- Lion (Panthera leo)
- Spotted hyena (Crocuta crocuta)

=== Killer Bears ===
While hiking through Montana's Glacier National Park, Johan Otter and Jenna Otter are attacked by a raging grizzly intent on protecting her cubs; after visiting the hot springs in a remote British Columbia nature park, Patti McConnell and Kelly McConnell are mauled by a hungry 400-pound black bear; and, while on a two-week game shoot in the Alaskan wilderness, the tables turn on Pastor Johnny McCoy and his friend Gary Corle when they are ambushed by a grizzly.

- Grizzly bear (Ursus arctos)
- Black bear (Ursus americanus)

=== River Killers ===
While on the job at an exclusive Tampa, Florida golf club, an experienced golf ball diver is attacked by a territorial, 400-pound alligator; Jeff Tanswell's snorkeling trip turns into a bloody battle for his life when he is dragged under by a 12-foot (3.7 m) saltwater crocodile; and, while leading a Zambezi River safari, an experienced guide is savagely attacked by an aggressive hippopotamus defending its turf.

- Alligator (Alligator mississippiensis)
- Saltwater crocodile (Crocodylus porosus)
- Hippopotamus (Hippopotamus amphibius)

=== Killer Cats and Dogs ===
On a camping trip in the Canadian wilderness, the Delventhal family is unwittingly stalked by a hungry and opportunistic wolf; while mowing the lawn on a Sunday afternoon, a suburban Virginia man named Jimmy Hawthorne is repeatedly menaced and attacked by a rabid coyote, and a mountain bike excursion in a California wilderness park becomes a life-and-death struggle when a cyclist is pounced upon and attacked by a 110-pound male cougar.

- Wolf (Canis lupus)
- Coyote (Canis latrans)
- Cougar (Puma concolor)

=== Killer Sharks ===
While diving for shellfish off Cape Howe, an Australian man ends up inside the jaws of a Great White shark; training for a triathlon off the Alabama coast, a swimmer meets an aggressive bull shark on the prowl for an early breakfast; and, determined to maintain his championship spear fishing title, Rodney Fox inadvertently becomes bait for a 15-foot-long (4.6 m) great white shark.

- Great white shark (Carcharodon carcharias)
- Bull shark (Carcharhinus leucas)
