= Into the Unknown =

Into the Unknown may refer to:

== Music ==
- Into the Unknown (Bad Religion album), 1983
- Into the Unknown (Mercyful Fate album), 1996
- "Into the Unknown" (song), a 2019 song by Idina Menzel and Aurora from the Frozen 2 soundtrack
- Into the Unknown, an EP by JJ

== Television and film ==
- "Into the Unknown" (Star Wars Resistance), 2019
- Into the Unknown: Making Frozen 2, a 2020 documentary about the Disney film Frozen 2 (2019)
- Into the Unknown (TV series), a non-fiction series

== Literature ==
- Into the Unknown: The Dungeon Survival Handbook, a D&D sourcebook, 2012
- Spider-Gwen: Into the Unknown, a graphic novel written by Seanan McGuire, 2024
