= Rich Bride Poor Bride =

American wedding planning reality television program

Original release
- Network: Slice

Rich Bride Poor Bride is a television series shown on Slice and the WE network. It follows the planning stages of a wedding. Each episode begins with a suggested budget and then follows the bride and groom as they struggle to plan their wedding. At the end of the episode the budget is revealed, and as the couple tally up the cost, the viewers learn whether they were under or over budget.
