= Cliff Simon =

South African actor (1962–2021)

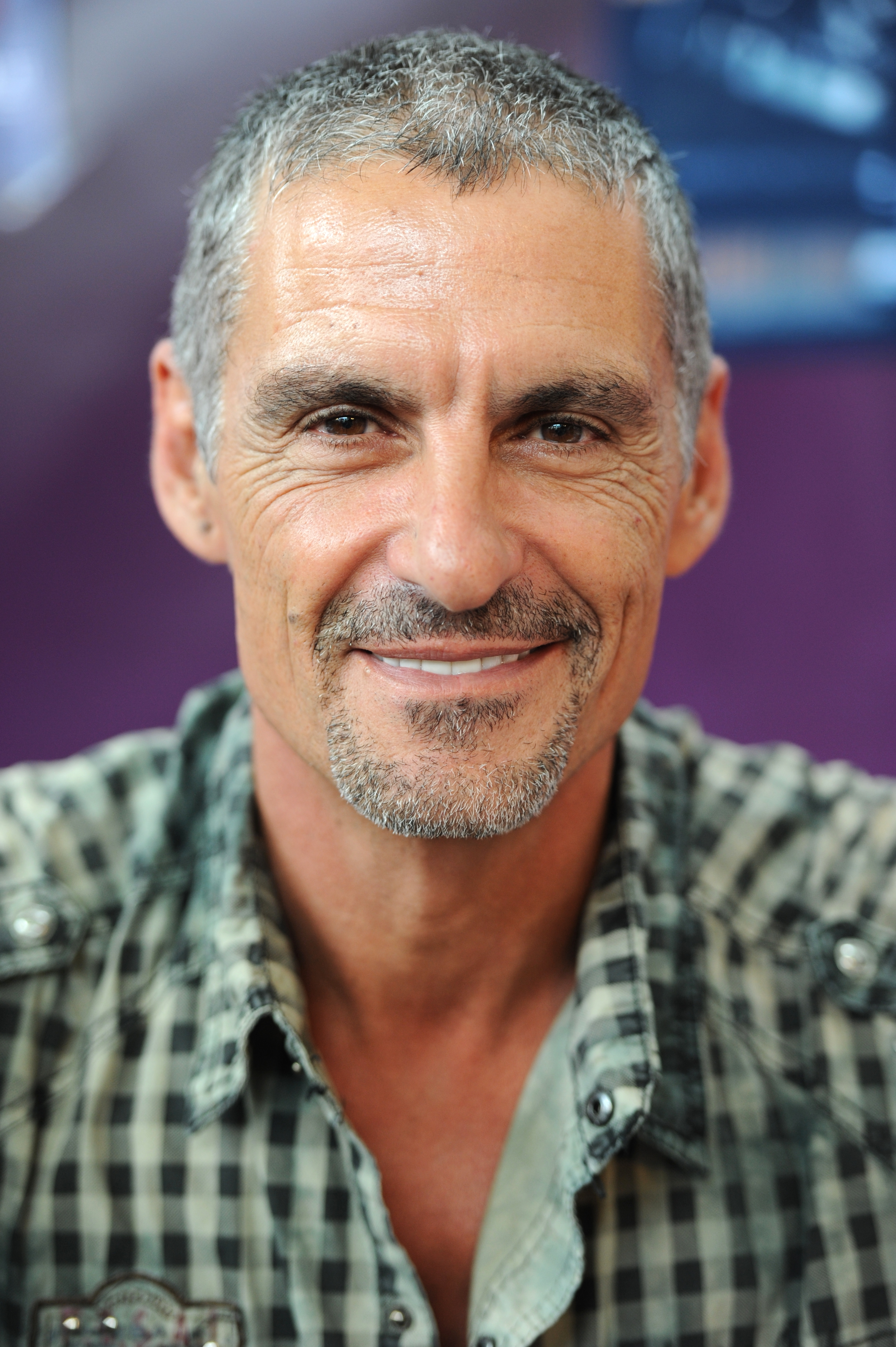
- Simon at the SciFi Convention 2012
- Born: 7 September 1962; Johannesburg, South Africa
- Died: 9 March 2021 (aged 58); Topanga, California, U.S.
- Education: The University of Houston and Southern Methodist University
- Occupation: Actor
- Years active: 1982–2021
- Spouse: Colette Simon (m. 1997)

Cliff Simon (7 September 1962 – 9 March 2021) was a South African actor, best known for his portrayal of Ba'al in Stargate SG-1.

== Early life ==
Simon was born in Johannesburg, the fourth child of Emmanuelle and Phylis Simon. Both of his parents are of Jewish ancestry from Poland and Lithuania. From a very young age, Simon dreamed of becoming the first South African swimmer to win an Olympic gold medal. His training started early under the guidance of his mother, a swimming teacher. By age 6, he showed some talent as a gymnast. By age 15, Simon had reached a national level in South Africa in both swimming and gymnastics, but discontinued gymnastics to better focus on swimming.

He attended Sandringham Primary School and Sandringham High School in Johannesburg. In 1975, Simon's parents decided to emigrate to the United Kingdom, due to the then-current turmoil in Africa. It was there that Simon completed his schooling and was chosen to swim on the British international squad. He competed in Olympic trials and qualified for the 1984 Summer Olympics in Los Angeles. The University of Houston and Southern Methodist University in Texas offered him scholarships, where he trained with the United States swimming team, the Mustangs. This could have culminated in his competing in the 1984 Olympic Games. However, he never made it into the games.

Back in South Africa, Simon entered the air force where he continued his swimming and achieved the highest athletic award given in the air force, the Victor Ludorum.

== Career ==
In 1982, after serving his two-year term in the air force, he landed a job teaching windsurfing and waterskiing at a resort hotel. A stage show was in production at the resort, and Simon was informed by one of the performers that the choreographer was looking for a gymnast.

Taking the job, Simon performed worldwide in various stage productions as a dancer/acrobat. In 1989, he was cast as a performer at the Moulin Rouge in Paris, France, Europe. He would later author the book Paris Nights: My Year at the Moulin Rouge (2016), a memoir of his time in Paris.

While studying drama, Simon secured himself a modelling agent and enjoyed success in ramp, print, and television commercials. Simon received recognition as a model in South Africa and was asked to enter the Mr. South Africa talent and action man competition. On winning this competition in 1992, Simon was offered an audition on the television series, Egoli: Place of Gold. After three months as guest star on the show, he accepted a lead role which he continued for six years.

Simon emigrated to the US in 2000, arriving in Los Angeles. Simon secured an agent, and landed a guest star role with Don Johnson on the hit TV series, Nash Bridges. A short time after that, he acquired the guest star role of Ba'al on Stargate SG-1. Ba'al became a recurring character for six seasons and was featured in the 2008 Stargate movie Stargate: Continuum. In 2015, Simon appeared in a video as Ba'al for the conservation group, Sea Shepherd.

In July 2015, Simon was cast in a supporting role in the sci-fi/thriller film Project Eden.

In 2019, Simon presented the travelogue documentary Into the Unknown (Uncharted Mysteries UK title) which premiered on The History Channel in the UK on 24 February 2020. The premise of that show was solo global travel, searching for hidden clues to "history's most nightmarish myths."

== Personal life ==
In 1997, Simon and his wife Collette were married in a game lodge in South Africa.

In 2005, Simon became a United States citizen.

Cliff Simon died due to a kiteboarding accident (Note: Such accidents are a rarity. Risks are roughly like skiing. However, "Kiteboarding accidents can be dangerous and even deadly. Because riders are harnessed by the power of the wind, there are some risks kiteboarders have to take into consideration." One study found that "the risk of injury during competition was 2.5 times higher than during training.") in Topanga, California on 9 March 2021 at the age of 58.

== Filmography ==
- Egoli: Place of Gold – Gregory (Mitch) Mitchel (unknown episodes, 1992–1999)
- Operation Delta Force 5: Random Fire – Austin (2000)
- Nash Bridges – Dirk van der Goes (1 episode, 2000)
- Stargate SG-1 – Ba'al (15 episodes, 2001–2007)
- Stargate: Continuum – Ba'al (2008)
- 24 – Russian Sniper (Season 8 Episode 1, 2010)
- Undercovers – (season 1, episode 4: "Jailbreak", 2010)
- NCIS: Los Angeles – Hans Christian Kemp (season 2, episode 13: "Archangel", 2011)
- The Americans – Yossi
- NCIS: New Orleans – Dmitry Babakov (Season 1, Episode 03: "Breaking Brig", 2014) (Credit as Cliff Marc Simon)
- Castle – Polkovnik (Season 7, Episode 04: "Child's Play", 2014) (Credit as Cliff Marc Simon)
- Into the Unknown (Uncharted Mysteries UK title) – Himself (2020)

== Published work ==
- Simon, Cliff; Stephens, Loren (15 July 2016). Paris Nights: My Year at the Moulin Rouge (Paperback) (2nd ed.). Grapevine, Texas: Waldorf Publishing. ISBN 978-1943848928.
