= My House, Your Money =

- Genre: Reality
- Country of origin: Canada
- Original language: English
- No. of seasons: 2
- No. of episodes: 16

Production
- Production company: Cineflix Inc.

Original release
- Network: W Network, HGTV

My House, Your Money is a Cineflix produced realty reality programme that aired on W Network in Canada and HGTV in the United States in 2011 and 2012. The show follows young individuals who are the hunt for their first home, but are relying on family members for financial assistance, and thus must navigate disagreements among their family about their choices.

== Episodes ==
1. "Zochowski Family”
2. "Madigan Family”
3. "Hardman Family”
4. “The Posinellis”
5. "Saunders Family”
6. “Hyatt Family”
7. “Lewis Knowles”
8. “The Teeuwsens”
9. “The Javiers”
10. “The Arscotts”
11. “The Curbelos”
12. “The Lumbs”
13. "The Durands”
14. “The Avrahams”
15. "The Romms”
16. "Basinski Family”
