= The Next Line =

Canadian game show

- Genre: Game show
- Presented by: Kevin Frank
- Announcer: Kathy Morse
- Country of origin: Canada
- No. of seasons: 1
- No. of episodes: 65

Production
- Running time: approx. 22 minutes

Original release
- Network: Global
- Release: 1991 – 1992

The Next Line is a Canadian television game show. Produced by Blair Murdoch, it was filmed at the studios of U.TV in Vancouver, British Columbia. Hosted by Kevin Frank, with Kathy Morse (later the mayor of Maple Ridge from 2002 to 2005) as the announcer, it centered on viewing classic movie clips, music and quotes that were cut off at a point and then determining which of a panel of "experts" gave the correct line that followed. It premiered in 1991 on many Global Television Network stations, running for 13 weeks. Reruns were first aired on Prime Network in the late 90s, and later resurfaced on GameTV.

== Gameplay ==
Four contestants played the game against a regular panel of four "experts" that featured actors Pete Barbutti, Neil Crone, Veena Sood, and Denalda Williams.

Five rounds were played. Each contestant started with 100 points and could wager as many points as they wanted on the panelist they thought gave the correct line to the clip. A correct match earned the player the points they wagered, while an incorrect match subtracted the wagered points from their score. The contestant with the most points at the end of the fifth round was declared the day's champion and won an assortment of prizes.

=== Round 1 ===
Odds were placed at 1-1, meaning a correct match added the points the player wagered to their score. A player was allowed to bet a maximum half of their original 100 points. In round 1, a scene from a classic movie was played, after some point the dialogue stopped. A reminder of the last line spoken by the character in the clip was shown on the monitors, at which time each of the panelists would give their take on what the next line would be. After the fourth panelist gave their answer, the players made their wagers, a recap was given by the panelists, and the clip was restarted with the next line added.

=== Round 2 ===
In this round, odds were placed at 2-1, which could earn a player double their wagered points for a correct match. The clip shown featured one or more of the panelists, and/or Frank occasionally, acting out a situation. The segment was often called "Expert in the Street" or "Panelist in the Park". And although a panelist, maybe more than one, appeared in the clip, he/she/they may not be giving the correct next line.

=== Round 3 ===
Odds remain at 2-1. The clip in Round 3 involved an ordinary person stopped on the streets of Vancouver to read a real-life fact.

=== Round 4 ===
The odds in round 4 increased to 5-1, meaning a player could add 5 times their wagered points to their score. In this round, often called "Mangled Movie", another classic movie clip was played, but the dialogue had been replaced with dubbing by one or more of the panelists.

=== Round 5 ===
With the odds now at 10-1 (earning a player 10 times their wagered points), it could be anybody's game. Any player with 90 points or more may wager up to 90 points in this round. This round played a little differently. Instead of showing movie clips, an original song was performed (music was usually written by Barbutti, with lyrics by the panel) with each panelist singing a line they had written that they thought would be the next in the song, which was performed on piano by Barbutti. Unlike the previous rounds, there was no panel recap. After wagering, the line was revealed by Kevin, who usually sang it himself.

The player with the most points at the end of this round won the game and a prize; if the winning player made a correct bet in all 5 rounds, a bonus prize was also awarded. If there was a tie, the Liars Club tiebreaker was used to determine the winner.
