= Cineflix =

Canadian media production and distribution company

Cineflix Media Inc.
- Type: Private
- Founded: 1998; 28 years ago
- Founders: Glen Salzman; Katherine Buck
- Headquarters: Montreal, Quebec, Canada
- Key people: Glen Salzman: co-founder and co-CEO; Katherine Buck: co-founder and co-CEO
- Products: TV shows and documentaries
- Subsidiaries: Cineflix Productions; Cineflix Rights; Cineflix Studios; Buccaneer Media
- Website: cineflix.com

Cineflix Media is a Canadian global media production and distribution company. Headquartered in Montreal, Quebec, Canada, it has branches in Toronto, New York City, London, and Dublin.

Subsidiaries include United Kingdom-based Cineflix Rights, which handles international distribution of factual and scripted programming; Cineflix Studios, which provides co-production, co-financing, and distribution of scripted content for the United States, Canada, and international markets; and Cineflix Productions, its television production and development company based in Toronto and New York. Cineflix also has a partnership in production company Buccaneer Media which has produced shows such as Marcella.

== History ==
In June 2002, Cineflix launched its international distribution arm based in London, England named Cineflix International with Cineflix appointing Paul Heaney as their managing director of Cineflix's new United Kingdom-based British international distribution division; By September 2011, Cineflix would later rebrand its British international distribution division to Cineflix Rights as part of a strategic move to grow the distribution business, increase revenues and to reflect its global distribution market.

In January 2005, Cineflix announced it had launched its own British production division based in London where its distribution arm Cineflix International is held in that region with Cineflix's new British production arm would be entitled Cineflix Productions UK Cineflix hiring Outline Productions' managing director Simon Lloyd to run Cineflix's British production arm Cineflix Production UK under the role of president of the new UK production arm as Cineflix's new British production arm would produce factual series in that country.

In October 2006, Cineflix established its dedicated international co-production division that would co-produce television series with international production companies and would handle partnership with international production companies to produce programming to other countries as Isabelle Bourduas would head up Cineflix's new international co-production division.

In April 2012, American film producer Participant Media acquired a equity minority investment stake in Cineflix Media with the two companies working together on Participant Media's television productions.

In September 2014, Cineflix Media announced the departure of executives of Cineflix's British production arm Cineflix Productions UK, Camilla Lewis and Rob Carey, with them completing a management buyout of Cineflix's British production arm Cineflix Productions UK and launched an factual independent production company called Curve Media. As part of the deal, Curve Media took over Cineflix's UK operations and acquired a state of Cineflix's British production catalogue including Salvage Hunters as Cineflix Media's distribution arm Cineflix Rights retained distribution to Cineflix Productions UK catalogue.

In May 2017, Cineflix Media expanded its British production output and had partnered with former executive producer of American talk-show Jimmy Kimmel Live!, Duncan Grey, and his Gateshead-based studio Twenty Six 03 Content & had jointly established a joint-venture British non-scripter production company based in London, called Twenty Six 03 Entertainment that would co-produce unscripted entertainment series with Cineflix would co-produce & handle distribution via Cineflix Rights to the programming produced by the new studio Twenty Six 03 Entertainment. Two years later in September 2019, Twenty Six 03 Entertainment's co-founder & Twenty Six 03's parent & owner Duncan Gray had taken control of the joint-venture production company Twenty Six 03 Entertainment.

On November 30, 2017, Cineflix Media teamed up with Pablo Salzman to launch a new production subsidiary called Connect3 Productions with the new subsidiary aiming to co-produce scripted and factual series for North American and international markets.

In May 2019, Cineflix Media whom produced the home-renovating series Property Brothers expanded its partnership with American international entertainment company Scott Brothers Global by selling the brand and related IP rights to the presenters Drew and Jonathan Scott through the latter company who will produce all future Property Brothers projects via Scott Brothers Entertainment. As part of the deal, Cineflix's distribution arm Cineflix Rights retained all worldwide distribution rights excluding North America to all current and future Scott Brothers' programmes with Cineflix became a financial and distribution participation to all future Property Brothers projects.

In April 2021, Cineflix Media partnered with former president of its Cineflix Productions division, Charles Tremayne, to launch an American production company based in New York named First Story Productions which will focus on scripted and factual development and production work with Cineflix co-producing First Story's programmes whilst its distribution unit Cineflix Rights handling distribution to the latter's productions.

At the end of March 2022, Cineflix Media acquired Toronto-based production company and Coroner co-producer Back Alley Film Productions alongside its programming library and a stake in the crime drama Coroner with Cineflix absorbing Back Alley Film Productions' production operations.

On November 3 2023, Cineflix expanded its operation by launching a production office in Vancouver called Cineflix Studios Vancouver with industry veteran Mark Miller leading the Vancouver office as their president.

== Productions ==
| Title | Years | Network | Notes |
|---|---|---|---|
| Mayday | 2003–present | USA Network Canada; National Geographic Channel (International) | Also known as Air Crash Investigation, Air Crash: Disaster Revealed, Air Emergency, Air Disasters, and Mayday: Air Disaster. |
| Human Prey | 2009 | Discovery Channel Canada, Animal Planet Canada and Canal D | co-production with Nextfilm Productions |
| American Pickers | 2010–present | History Channel (United States) | |
| Canadian Pickers | 2011–2013 | History Canada | |
| My House, Your Money | 2011–2012 | W Network | |
| Copper | 2012–2013 | Showcase; BBC America (United States) | via Cineflix and Cineflix Studios co-production with The Levinson/Fontana Company |
| Food Factory | 2012–present | Flavour Network | |
| House Hazards | 2012 | HGTV Canada | |
| Pet School | 2012–2013 | CBBC (United Kingdom) | via Cineflix Productions UK |
| Wynonna Earp | 2016–2021 | CHCH-DT/CTV Sci-Fi Channel; Syfy (United States) | co-production with SEVEN24 Films and IDW Entertainment |
| Coroner | 2019–2022 | CBC | co-production with Back Alley Film Productions and Muse Entertainment |
| The Doll Factory | 2023 | Paramount+ | via Cineflix Rights co-production with Buccaneer Media and Shinawil |
| Anna Pigeon | 2026–present | USA Network and Citytv (Canada) | co-commission with Bell Media, co production with SEVEN24 Films and December Films |

- Animal House: A Dog's Life
- Battle Factory
- Cash and Cari
- Copper
- Crash of the Century
- The Deed
- The Deed: Chicago
- The Detectives Club: New Orleans
- Dogs with Jobs
- The Filthy Rich Guide
- Final 24
- Flipping Virgins
- Food Factory USA
- Gangland Undercover
- Home Factory
- How It's Made
- Into the Unknown
- Marcella
- Motives & Murders: Cracking the Case
- My Teenage Wedding
- Property Brothers
- Property Brothers: Buying + Selling
- Property Virgins
- Pure
- Style Factory
- Surviving Evil
- Trapped
- Urban Legends
- Weird or What?
- Zero Hour
