= Cash and Cari =

Canadian TV series

- Genre: Reality
- Country of origin: Canada
- Original language: English
- No. of seasons: 3

Production
- Running time: 60 minutes
- Production company: Cineflix Inc.

Original release
- Network: HGTV W Network
- Release: February 4, 2011 – August 20, 2013

Cash and Cari is a television show starring estate sale expert Cari Cucksey produced by Cineflix. The show airs on W Network in Canada and HGTV in the U.S.A. Cari searches through homes, looking for items to sell and refurbishing as she prepares the home for a huge estate sale. Cari searches for antiques, collectible, and one-of-a-kind items. Once Cari and her team of experts price out and set up for the sale, they open to the public hoping to sell anything and everything they can.

== Host ==
=== Cari Cucksey ===
Host Cari Cucksey developed a love of antiquing from her mother. Cari's love for selling, trading and buying antiques began when she was 12 years old. She has been a professional estate liquidator for over 10 years, traveling across America in search of the oldest and most unusual items she can find to sell or restore.

Cari previously owned and operated a retail store in Northville, Michigan named RePurpose Estate Services, which has since closed. The retail shop featured antiques, consignment items, designer and vintage clothing and accessories.

== Seasons ==
=== Season 1 ===
Episode 101: Run Studebaker Run!

Episode 102: Money in Music

Episode 103: Estate Sale Show Down

Episode 104: The Reluctant Seller

Episode 105: Jammed Packed Treasures

Episode 106: Collectors' Paradise

Episode 107: Waterford Wars

Episode 108: The Charitable Sale

Episode 109: Fine Furniture Estate Sale

Episode 110: Railway to Heaven

Episode 111: The Scent of Success. This episode features the restoration of an antique clock by Andy & Dan Anderson openers of Northville Watch and Clock Shop.

Episode 112: Rich Pickings

Episode 113: Grandfather's Treasure Trove

=== Season 2 ===
Episode 201 “Estate Sale Frenzy”

Episode 202 “Planes, Drains and Great Deals”

Episode 203 “Blue Bin Bonanza”

Episode 204 “Fresh Faces”

Episode 205 “Quirky Collectibles”

Episode 206 “Cari’s Sale Contest”

Episode 207 “Corvette Bidding War”

Episode 208 “High End Estate Sale”

Episode 209 “Signs of Trouble”

Episode 210 “A Tale of Two Sales”

Episode 211 "A Sale for Susie"

Episode 212 “Collector’s Delight”

Episode 213 “Sale At The Mansion”
