= Into the Unknown (TV series) =

- Genre: Factual
- Created by: Robin Keats
- Presented by: Cliff Simon
- Country of origin: United States
- Original language: English
- No. of seasons: 1
- No. of episodes: 6

Production
- Executive producer: Robin Keats
- Running time: 60 minutes
- Production company: Cineflix

Original release
- Network: History
- Release: February 24, 2020

Into the Unknown is a non-fiction series produced by Cineflix and hosted by Cliff Simon that first premiered on the History channel in the UK on February 24, 2020 under the alternative title Uncharted Mysteries. The show sees Simon travel solo across the globe, into some of the most extreme and forbidding landscapes, searching for hidden clues to some of the most nightmarish myths of all time.

== Episodes ==
Season	Episodes	Originally released	
Season	Episodes	First released	Last released
1	6	February 24, 2020	March 30, 2020

=== Season 1 ===
No. overall	No. in season	Title	Original release date
1	1	"The Night Marchers"	February 24, 2020
Survivalist Cliff Simon goes in search of Hawaii's long-dead warriors known as Nightmarchers.
2	2	"The Brown Mountain Lights"	March 2, 2020
Cliff aims to find answers to what causes the weird orb-like lights over North Carolina's Brown Mountain.
3	3	"The Rougarou"	March 9, 2020
Cliff heads to the Louisiana swamps in search of the lair of a shape-shifting monster the locals call the Rougarou.
4	4	"The Jersey Devil"	March 16, 2020
Cliff goes in search of the truth behind a recent spike in sightings of the fabled Jersey Devil.
5	5	"The Mojave Sandman"	March 23, 2020
Cliff heads into the Mojave Desert in Southern Californian in search of Bigfoot.
6	6	"The Legend Of Mount Shasta"	March 30, 2020
Cliff heads to California's Mount Shasta to solve the mystery of why dozens of people have vanished over the years.
