= Dogs with Jobs =

Canadian documentary television series

- Genre: Documentary
- Developed by: Merrily Weisbord; Kim Kachanoff
- Written by: Sara Gilbert; Maura Kealey; Shelley Tepperman; Jon Kalina
- Directed by: Serge Marcil; Susan Mawhood; Eli Gorn; Ole Gjerstad; Ramelle Mair
- Narrated by: Jon Kalina; John Ralston
- Theme music composer: Lance Neveu; Mathieu Vanasse
- Country of origin: Canada
- No. of seasons: 5
- No. of episodes: 65

Production
- Executive producers: Glen Salzman; David York; Katherine Buck; Andre Barro
- Producers: Maura Kealey; Robert DeLeskie
- Editors: Barbara Brown; George T. Clarke
- Running time: 30 minutes
- Production companies: Cineflix; National Geographic Channel; Slice

Original release
- Release: January 8, 2000 – September 7, 2004

Related
- Animals at Work

Dogs with Jobs is a Canadian documentary television series about working dogs and show dogs. Each half-hour episode consists of two to three segments on individual dogs from around the world. The family-friendly series has featured service dogs, search and rescue dogs, police dogs, herding dogs, and others. Segments show footage of dogs on the job, and also include stories of their rescue, training, and relationships with their owners and handlers.

== Production and broadcast ==
Title card from Dogs with Jobs

The idea for the series came from Canadian writer Merrily Weisbord and her daughter, veterinarian Kim Kachanoff. They made use of a "doggie-cam", giving viewers a glimpse into the dog's perspective.

Weisbord and Kachanoff sold the show to Cineflix producer Glen Salzman, who presented it in a "market simulation" at the September 7, 1998 Banff International Television Festival. The series premiered on Canada's Life Network (now Slice), where it received positive ratings and reviews, before premiering in the US a year later in the form of a 90-minute compilation during a PBS pledge drive.

The series is produced by Cineflix, in association with Slice in Canada and the National Geographic Channel internationally. The series' initial run lasted five seasons, from January 8, 2000 to September 7, 2004, including 65 episodes, and airing in 57 countries. As of November 2014, the first three seasons were available on Netflix instant streaming. As of February 2016, the first two seasons were available to stream on Netflix instant streaming.

== Reception ==
In his The New York Times review, film critic Matthew Hays wrote that "the gently narrated, heartwarming stories of Dogs With Jobs are certainly the antithesis of other reality-based animal programming like Fox's When Animals Attack!", and called the show "as simple and as slightly absurd as its name".

The series earned a cult following and achieved strong international sales. Said executive producer Glen Salzman, "This show really does work like magic with audiences." The series was featured on a segment of The Oprah Winfrey Show on September 4, 2000.

Common Sense Media awarded the show four out of five stars for quality, and three out of five points for inclusion of positive messages. They deemed it appropriate for children aged five and older, calling it "a good TV choice for the family" and "a great way to introduce kids to the idea of a 'working dog' so that they can recognize and respect those they might meet in everyday life."

== Animals at Work dispute ==
On September 3, 2012, Merrily Weisbord, who developed the show, sued Cineflix and producer Glen Salzman in Quebec Superior Court for $400,000 over their program Animals at Work, also called Frisky Business. Weisbord alleged that the program was a knockoff or sequel of Dogs with Jobs, having the same structure, and even featuring at least fifteen of the same dogs.

== Transmissions ==
Season	Episodes	Originally released	
Season	Episodes	First released	Last released
1	13	January 8, 2000	September 19, 2000
2	13	January 15, 2001	September 18, 2001
3	13	January 12, 2002	October 25, 2002
4	13	January 11, 2003	October 8, 2003
5	13	January 10, 2004	September 7, 2004

== Episodes ==
=== Season 1 (2000) ===
No. overall	No. in season	Title	Original release date
1	1	"Maggie & A.J."	January 8, 2000
2	2	"Bruno & Honey"	September 4, 2000
3	3	"Sarcelle & Sweep"	September 5, 2000
4	4	"Landris & Wolf"	September 6, 2000
5	5	"Nipper & Bellow"	September 7, 2000
6	6	"Endal & Dee"	September 8, 2000
7	7	"Petro & Mel"	September 11, 2000
8	8	"Willy & Rope"	September 12, 2000
9	9	"Corky & Malcolm"	September 13, 2000
10	10	"Clipper & Bam-Bam"	September 14, 2000
11	11	"Kavik & Mas"	September 15, 2000
12	12	"Dani & King"	September 18, 2000
13	13	"Sled Dog"	September 19, 2000

=== Season 2 (2001) ===
No. overall	No. in season	Title	Original release date
14	1	"Gracie, Tiger, & Klondike"	January 15, 2001
15	2	"Popsicle: Drug-bust Dog/Popsicle, Harvey, and Tattie"	September 3, 2001
16	3	"Tilly: Arson Dog/Tilly, Murphy, and Madison"	September 4, 2001
17	4	"Tokkolos: Big Cat Parent/Tokkolos, Barkley, and Rookie"	September 5, 2001
18	5	"Ginny: The Dog Who Rescues Cats/Ginny, Basil, and Freddie"	September 6, 2001
19	6	"Rowdy: TV Star/Rowdy, Wizard, and Rio"	September 7, 2001
20	7	"Tombre: Special Companion/Tombre, Rosa, and Gabe"	September 10, 2001
21	8	"MacKenzie: Guide Dog/MacKenzie, Bear, Tess, and Blue"	September 11, 2001
22	9	"Fay Wray: Artist's Muse/Fay Wray, Jake, and Toby"	September 12, 2001
23	10	"Marty and the Madcap Mutts/Marty, Tasha, and Nana"	September 13, 2001
24	11	"Kiyoshi: Double Duty Dog/Kiyoshi, Brix, Ellie"	September 14, 2001
25	12	"Yukon: Search and Rescue Dog/Yukon, Biggles, and Kodak"	September 17, 2001
26	13	"Johnny and the Sled Dogs/Johnny, Bozo, and Flip-Flop"	September 18, 2001

=== Season 3 (2002) ===
No. overall	No. in season	Title	Original release date
27	1	"Tuffy, Lulu, and Wiley"	January 12, 2002
28	2	"Kaze, Haci, and Paugan"	September 2, 2002
29	3	"Stan, Fudge, and Rocky"	September 3, 2002
30	4	"Kenny: A Hearing Dog/Kenny, Daisy, and Duncan"	September 4, 2002
31	5	"Eagle, Vasala, Tillamook Cheddar"	September 5, 2002
32	6	"Lucy, Harvey, and Chokydar"	September 6, 2002
33	7	"Cheko, Ben, Sam"	September 9, 2002
34	8	"Birba, Uga VI, & Maggie"	October 22, 2002
35	9	"Speedy and Friends: London Police Dogs/Speedy, Bruce Wayne, and Mr. Gomez"	October 23, 2002
36	10	"Elite, Valen, and Tracker"	October 24, 2002
37	11	"Peek, Canaan, Willi"	October 25, 2002
38	12	"Beau, Dar, and Jumpin' Jack"	October 25, 2002
39	13	"Turbeaux, Killu, and Ruby"	October 25, 2002

=== Season 4 (2003) ===
No. overall	No. in season	Title	Original release date
40	1	"Annie, Casey, and Sailor"	January 11, 2003
41	2	"Zelda, Azili, Amy"	March 26, 2003
42	3	"Moby, Morgan, Barney"	March 27, 2003
43	4	"Part-Ex, Bingo, Morgan"	March 28, 2003
44	5	"Teabag, Harris, Barack, and China"	July 31, 2003
45	6	"Bonita, Lily, Wheely Willy"	August 1, 2003
46	7	"Ben, Jonah, Koby"	August 4, 2003
47	8	"Nikki, Kelsey, and Aron"	September 1, 2003
48	9	"Kaiser, Tikva, Macho"	September 2, 2003
49	10	"Vernon, Bodhi, Baron"	September 3, 2003
50	11	"Eddie, Velino, Sir Lancelot"	September 4, 2003
51	12	"Vera, Joe Cowboy, and Thirty"	October 7, 2003
52	13	"Beauty, Cinder, and Blaze"	October 8, 2003

=== Season 5 (2004) ===
No. overall	No. in season	Title	Original release date
53	1	"Nyack, Cinder, Clancy"	January 10, 2004
54	2	"Cooper, Wasabe, Frito"	January 11, 2004
55	3	"Zoro, Suzy Q, and Sven"	January 11, 2004
56	4	"Dakota, Orca, and Target"	January 12, 2004
57	5	"Cass, Buddy, and Mercedes"	January 19, 2004
58	6	"Peewee, Zeke, Ozzy"	January 26, 2004
59	7	"Cindy, Chipper, Hope"	February 2, 2004
60	8	"Piripiri, Pugsly, Joshi"	February 9, 2004
61	9	"Ana, Bill, and Banjo"	February 16, 2004
62	10	"Pay, Fergus, Blossom"	February 23, 2004
63	11	"Huntaway Steam, Heavenly Angel, Mike"	March 1, 2004
64	12	"Jassel, Ingrid, Hogan"	September 6, 2004
65	13	"Keno, Mentor, Prince"	September 7, 2004

== See also ==
- K-9 to 5, an American television series about working dogs.
