= The KangaZoo Club =

Television series

The KangaZoo Club is an educational program about wild animals produced by Quadramedia Management, Inc., recorded in Toronto in front of an audience (the kangaZoo Club), and aired on Global TV in 1984. 26 episodes, each 24 minutes long, were recorded. The show was hosted by Russel Chong and Melissa Glavota, and featured a big kangaroo costume character named KangaZoo (voiced by Julianne Rice) with a pouch full of animals that would be found in zoos. The show featured animal related songs by composer Nancy Ryan, and ended with a meeting of the KangaZoo Club, giving the audience a chance to share letters, drawings, and jokes.

Russel and Melissa took viewers on expeditions to Canadian zoos including the Toronto Zoo with Toby Styles, Marineland in Niagara Falls with Mark Shawver, and the African Lion Safari in Rockton with Ron Cameron, where they interviewed animal handlers to get answers to questions that the children might want to ask.

Location Director: Jim Borecki Location VTR: Barry Elliott Location Sound: Dale Rechner

The show aired on Global TV in 1984 and its reruns aired on YTV in the late 1980s. It was also imprinted on VHS and distributed by Crocus Entertainment in 1988.

- Volume 1: Baboons, Sea Lions, Tigers
- Volume 2: Monkeys, Crocodiles, Lions
- Volume 3: Gorillas, Dolphins, Cheetahs
- Volume 4: Timberwolves, Vultures, Sea Turtles
- Volume 5: Grizzly bears, Orcas, Eagles

== See also ==
- List of zoos
