= Blue Rainbow =

- Also known as: The Blue Rainbow: The Weaving Treasures
- Genre: Children's
- Created by: Lutia Lauzon
- Written by: John Turner, Michael Kennard
- Directed by: Greg Abrams (1995-2000); Ross Janes
- Starring: Lutia Lauzon; Michael Kennard; John Turner
- Theme music composer: Lutia Lauzon
- Opening theme: Lutia Lauzon
- Ending theme: Greg Abrams (1995-2000); Lutia Lauzon
- Composers: Lutia Lauzon (songs), Greg Abrams (soundtrack & incidental music)
- Country of origin: Canada
- Original language: English

Production
- Producers: Lutia Lauzon; Ross Janes; Greg Abrams
- Production locations: Kingston Peninsula, Harvey, Theatre New Brunswick, New Brunswick
- Editor: Peter Bauer
- Camera setup: Gregg Janes; Joe MacDonald
- Running time: 30 minutes
- Production companies: Just Peachy Productions Ltd. Abrams Media Inc. (1995-2000)

Original release
- Network: CBC Television; Global Television Network
- Release: 1984 – 2000

Blue Rainbow is a Canadian Children's television series created and hosted by Lutia Lausane (Lil) who was always dressed in a pink dress and told stories while playing her harp. Michael Kennard and John Turner played the clowns Dirk and Drock for three seasons.
