= Worst to First (TV series) =

Canadian television series

Worst to First is a Canadian home renovation television series, which debuted on HGTV on September 4, 2017. Hosted by contractors Sebastian Sevallo and Mickey Fabbiano, the series features the duo assisting aspiring homeowners in purchasing and renovating undervalued and outdated homes in the Greater Vancouver area.

The series is produced by Thunderbird Entertainment's Great Pacific Media division.

== List of episodes ==
Season 1
Episode	Title	Air Date
1	Alexis & Tyler	Sept. 4, 2017
2	Shelley & Mike	Sept. 11, 2017
3	Alex & Andy	Sept. 18, 2017
4	Nicole & Joe	Sept. 25, 2017
5	Eesa & Jazz	Oct. 2, 2017
6	Amanda & Darren	Oct. 9, 2017
7	Louise & John	Oct. 16, 2017
8	Heather & Steve	Oct. 23, 2017
9	Julia & Ian	Oct. 30, 2017
10	Debbie & Carson	Nov. 6, 2017
