= Kidsbeat =

Television news series

Kidsbeat is a Canadian children's TV news series that aired on the Global Television Network during the 1980s and 1990s.

Airing Saturdays at 12:30 p.m. (rebroadcast on TVOntario at 11:30 a.m. on Sundays), the program featured various news stories and specials focusing on issues that mattered to kids. It also had a strong emphasis on pop culture, including a segment with short musical clips from the week's top five singles, and sometimes featured video games. It had a variety of different hosts, including, Kevin Newman, Dave Hatch, Pauline Chan, Nerene Virgin, Doug Gamey and Serena Keshavjee amongst others.
