= Bulging Brides =

Canadian television series

- Starring: Tom Europe; Nadeen Boman; Jean Okada
- Country of origin: Canada
- Original language: English

Production
- Production location: Vancouver, British Columbia
- Running time: 23 minutes

Original release
- Network: Slice; Ion Television

Related
- The Last 10 Pounds Bootcamp

Bulging Brides is a Canadian television series in which brides receive assistance in losing weight for their wedding day. It is produced by Slice, and shown on Slice and Discovery Health Channel in Canada and the WE: Women's Entertainment network and Ion Television in the United States.

The show is co-hosted by personal trainer Tommy Europe and nutrition specialist Nadeen Boman. Seamstress Jean Okada evaluates how well the brides fit into their wedding gowns.

== Plot ==
Each episode begins with a bride roughly two months before her wedding day, trying on a wedding dress and finding it does not fit. Europe and Boman offer their assistance to help her shed the pounds necessary. After reviewing the bride's food diary, Boman makes her feel guilty by taking her down the "Aisle of Shame" which recreates the bride's high-calorie diet. Boman then offers a more healthy diet for the bride to follow. Next, Europe uses a computer simulation to depict what the bride will look like in a few years based on her current diet and activity and the fact that many brides gain a lot of weight during the first few years of marriage. The shocked bride agrees to accept Europe's assistance.

Next, the show follows the bride as she strays from her recommended diet. This is followed by a confrontation in which the bride must reaffirm her desire to follow the guidelines set by the hosts.

Partway through the weight loss regimen, the bride's measurements are taken, and she tries on her wedding gown. The bride has made some progress, but there is still work to be done.

For the final push, Europe enlists the bride's fiancé to join her and provide support in a run to the top of "Cardiac Hill".

At the end of the show, the bride's measurements are taken, and she tries on her wedding gown one last time. This time, the gown fits perfectly.
