= My Teenage Wedding =

- Genre: Reality
- Country of origin: Canada
- Original language: English
- No. of seasons: 2
- No. of episodes: 16

Production
- Running time: 22 minutes
- Production company: Cineflix

Original release
- Network: Slice (Canada)
- Release: May 31, 2012

My Teenage Wedding is a Canadian reality television series broadcast on Slice. Viewers follow producers "behind the scenes of Canada's teen weddings, following teenage couples as they leap headfirst into a very adult world of matrimony. When the big day approaches, the teen brides-and-grooms-to-be soon come to realize that marriage isn't as simple as saying 'I do'." The show premiered on May 31, 2012 and covers the weddings of teenagers from various different lifestyles. The first season had twelve episodes and concluded on January 31, 2013. Hashtag Gay Wedding received attention for being about same sex marriage. The couple in the episode, David Harris and Tre'Darrius Anderson, was described as possibly being "America's youngest black gay married couple."

"Everyone thinks they're too young to get married, but they don't care! Convinced that their love is forever, these teens will stop at nothing to walk down the aisle." "From touching moments, to outrageous meltdowns, this exciting...series follows their journey from teenage romance to grown up commitment as they discover that it's a bumpy road to happily ever after."

== Episodes ==
=== Season 1 ===
1. "Teen Moroccan Matrimony" episode 1, (aired 31 May 2012).

Cast	Description
Sarrah (18) and Victor (18)	

1. "Young, Crazy and in Love" episode 2, (aired 31 May 2012).

Cast	Description
Stephanie (19) and Adam (19)	

1. "Teenage Wedding on a Budget" episode 3, (aired 31 May 2012).

Cast	Description
Catherine (19) and Daniel (19)	

1. "Family Ties and Tying the Knot" episode 4, (aired 31 May 2012).

Cast	Description
Tyanna (18) and Jessie (19)	

=== Season 2 ===
1. 1 "Bride vs. Bro" episode 1, (aired 31 January 2013).

Cast	Description
Jessica (19) and Jorge (18)	A bromance threatens to put the kibosh on a wedding and grooms-men 13-year-old brother plans the bachelor party.

1. 2 "Shotgun Wedding" episode 2, (aired 31 January 2013).

Cast	Description
Patti (19) and Mikel (19)	Problems with potential in-laws are among the obstacles faced by a 19-year-old couple, who also deal with a fight breaking out between family members at the groom's bachelor party.

1. 3 "Best Frenemies" episode 3, (aired 8 February 2013).

Cast	Description
Rebecca (19) and Luis (19)	19-year-old mother is marrying her child's father. Even another engagement is announced, angering the bride-to-be.

1. "Tantrums and Tulle" episode 4, (aired 8 February 2013).

Cast	Description
Jessica (18) and Will (19)	Plans to get married meet with an overwhelming amount of disapproval; and the wedding is threatened when the groom gets drunk and avoids the bride's calls.

1. "Teen Dreamers" episode 5, (aired 22 February 2013).

Cast	Description
Lacey (19) and Brandon (19)	Couple plan to get hitched, but the bride threatens to call things off after she learns about strippers at the bachelor party.

1. "Suck It Up, Buttercup" episode 6, (aired 22 February 2013).

Cast	Description
Sam (19) and Rebecca (19)	Same-Sex couple plan to wed on a school day, but they need financial help in order to do so.

1. "Groom Meets Gown" episode 7, (aired 1 March 2013).

Cast	Description
Ashley (18) and Gavin (19)	Young deeply in love couple are planning to get married despite warnings from their families.

1. "Ahead of The Game" episode 8, (aired 1 March 2013).

Cast	Description
Kelsey (17) and Demarcus (19)	The wedding hits a roadblock when the couple learn that they need parental consent to get a marriage license.

1. "Web of Love" episode 9, (aired 8 March 2013).

Cast	Description
Brooke (17) and Austin (19)	A groom from Georgia wants to get married after dating online for two years to his bride who lives in Oregon.

1. "Hashtag Gay Wedding" episode 10, (aired 8 March 2013).

Cast	Description
David (19) and Tre'Darrius (19)	Young black gay couple in Memphis plans the get married. They must encounter a number of obstacles to get married.

1. "Off 2 Get Hitched" episode 11, (aired 28 March 2013).

Cast	Description
Leah (18) and Codey (19)	A custody battle breaks out over groom who just wants to marry his bride.

1. "Runaway Bride" episode 12, (aired 28 March 2013).

Cast	Description
Kendra (18) and Mark (19)	Bride ran away at younger age to be with her boyfriend. Now wants her parents to be supportive of her marriage.
