= 1996 Zambezi River hippopotamus attack =

Hippopotamus attack along Zambezi River

Coordinates: 17.926°S 25.857°E

The 1996 Zambezi River hippopotamus attack was an incident on the Zambezi River, Zimbabwe, near Victoria Falls on 9 March 1996 where a hippopotamus attacked two river tour guides killing one and injuring the other. The surviving tour guide is Zimbabwean Paul Templer (born c. 1968) who lost an arm in the attack. The tour guide who died by drowning was named Evans Namasango (born c. 1971) and was an apprentice guide to Templer.

== Description of attack ==
The attack began when a bull hippopotamus flipped Namasango's kayak with two passengers inside, and Templer rowed over to assist when he was attacked directly by the same hippopotamus. The hippopotamus attempted to swallow Templer, but it was unable to due to his size. The hippopotamus then released him, but it returned to attack him again, gravely injuring Templer. It released Templer again, and another apprentice guide named Mike rescued him and provided first aid. A different guide also attempted to find Namasango, but since it was nighttime he was not found until two days later about 1 kilometre (0.62 mi) away from where the hippopotamus flipped his kayak. Namasango reportedly defended French and German tourists using his oar before going missing. Tourists in Namasango's kayak swam through the water before being rescued.

It took approximately eight hours to get Templer to a hospital that could treat his serious injuries. He was transported to a hospital near Bulawayo. His left arm had a degloving injury from the elbow down, his lung was punctured, and his Achilles tendon was torn out. He had a total of 38 serious bite injuries. Templer's left arm was amputated by hospital staff because of its injuries.

Templer has recounted the attack in detail to various news organizations, and he wrote about the experience in his partial autobiography, What's Left of Me: How I Lost a Fight with a Rogue Hippo and Won My Life.
