= Merrily Weisbord =

Canadian literary non-fiction writer, documentary screenwriter and broadcaster

- Born: Merrily
- Citizenship: Canada
- Occupations: Writer, Documentary Screenwriter, Broadcaster, Educator
- Employer(s): Concordia University, McGill University, SUNY Plattsburgh (Honors Center)
- Known for: Literary non-fiction, documentaries, creative writing teaching
- Notable work: The Love Queen of Malabar, The Valour and the Horror, Our Future Selves, Dogs with Jobs, The Strangest Dream
- Board member of: Founding member, Quebec Writers Federation; National Council, Writers' Union of Canada
- Awards: Finalist, Hilary Weston Writers' Trust Prize for Nonfiction (2010); Finalist, QWF Mavis Gallant Prize; Finalist, Charles Taylor Prize for Literary Non-Fiction

Merrily Weisbord is a Canadian literary non-fiction writer, documentary screenwriter and broadcaster. Her 2010 book The Love Queen of Malabar, a memoir of her longtime friendship with the late Indian writer Kamala Das, was a finalist for the 2010 Hilary Weston Writers' Trust Prize for Nonfiction, the QWF Mavis Gallant Prize for Non-fiction, and the Charles Taylor Prize for Literary Non-Fiction. Her other books include Dogs with Jobs, The Valour and the Horror (coauthored with Merilyn Simonds), Our Future Selves: Love, Life, Sex and Aging and The Strangest Dream.

== Career ==
Weisbord lives in Montreal and the Laurentian Mountains. She was a CBC Radio broadcaster before writing The Strangest Dream: Canadian Communists, the Spy Trials and the Cold War. She co-authored The Valour and the Horror: The Untold Story of Canadians in the Second World War, which was six weeks on Maclean's best-seller list. She also authored Our Future Selves: Love, Life, Sex and Aging, published in Canada, the US, French Canada, and Japan. She co-created the hit TV series Dogs with Jobs, which sold in 57 countries worldwide, and she wrote the documentary Deconstructing Supper, finalist for the Writers Guild of Canada Top Ten Awards. She wrote and co-directed Ted Allan: Minstrel Boy of the Twentieth Century, winner of the Chris Award for social documentary.

Weisbord is a founding member of the Quebec Writers Federation, served on the National Council of the Writers' Union of Canada and the CBC Short Story Competition jury, Canada Council Non-Fiction and Public Reading juries, and the Hilary Weston Non-Fiction jury. She is currently coordinator of the QWF Workshop Committee.

As a teacher, Weisbord was distinguished visiting professor at the Honors Center at SUNY Plattsburgh, has taught creative writing and documentary film at McGill University and Concordia University and was Concordia's first literary non-fiction writer-in-residence. She is based in Montreal, Quebec.

== Books ==
- The Strangest Dream: Canadian Communists, the Spy Trials and the Cold War (1983)
- Our Future Selves: Love, Life, Sex and Aging (1991)
- The Valour and the Horror: the Untold Story of Canadians in the Second World War (co-written with Merilyn Simonds, 1991)
- The Love Queen of Malabar: Memoir of a Friendship with Kamala Das (2010, McGill-Queens University Press)
- Dogs with Jobs: Working Dogs Around the World (co-written with Kim Kachanoff, 2000)

== Film and television ==
- Writer/co-director: Ted Allan: Minstrel Boy of the Twentieth Century
- Writer: Deconstructing Supper
- Creator: Dogs with Jobs
- Writer: Prostate Cancer: The Male Nightmare
- Writer: Once in August: Margaret Atwood
- Writer: Songololo: Voices of Change
