= K-9 to 5 =

American TV series about working dogs

- Genre: Educational
- No. of seasons: 3

Original release
- Network: Animal Planet
- Release: 1999 – 2001

K-9 to 5 is an American television series about dogs with jobs. It first aired on Animal Planet in 1999. In April 2000, a book by the same title by Colleen Needles and Kit Carson was published by Times/Discovery, featuring 30 stories of "real working dogs that run the gamut". The show ran for 3 seasons.

== Description ==
Each episode features three or more dogs with "everyday jobs", doing everything from traditional service dog work to ranch hand/shepherding work to more uncommon things like polar bear sentry duty in Northern Canada or bowling pin collector at a Florida bowling alley. The final segment is called "Howlin' Good Time" and features recreation activities for dogs such as surfing, freestyle dancing, and "Yappy Hour" at a local pub.

== Episodes ==
Season	Episodes	Originally released	
Season	Episodes	First released	Last released
1	13	October 2, 1999	December 25, 1999
2	12	January 6, 2001	April 4, 2001
3	14	May 29, 2001	August 17, 2001

== Reception ==
Commenting that K-9 to 5 is "not all fluff", Common Sense Media warned that the dogs "also perform jobs that may frighten younger kids, such as bomb sniffing, search and rescue, and SWAT duty...but overall it's a touching, sometimes-funny take on the unconditional love, intelligence, and loyalty of man, woman, and child's best friend".

== See also ==
- Dogs with Jobs, a Canadian documentary television program featuring working dogs
