= The Last 10 Pounds Bootcamp =

- Starring: Tom Europe; Nadeen Boman
- Country of origin: Canada
- Original language: English

Production
- Production location: Vancouver
- Running time: 23 minutes

Original release
- Network: Slice

Related
- Bulging Brides

The Last 10 Pounds Bootcamp is a Canadian television show on the Slice network that puts participants through an intense fitness and nutrition routine designed to help them reach a target weight in four weeks. The participants are usually motivated to lose weight by a wedding or some other important upcoming event in their lives. The show stars Tom Europe, a former CFL star turned celebrity trainer, who plays the role of the drill instructor at the bootcamp. Europe is often accompanied by Nadeen Boman, who helps the participants on the show learn about nutrition.

== Format ==
The show begins with short clips of bystanders, discussing where they would like to lose the "last 10 pounds". The last person interviewed is then introduced as the subject of the episode, with a voice-over from Tommy discussing her/his goals and issues. The participants on the show are predominantly female.

This introduction is usually followed by Tommy and Nadeen bursting into a social event and introducing themselves to the participant. They start by recording her/his weight, measurements, and, occasionally, body fat percentage, then Nadeen is shown cleaning out their cupboards of junk food while Tommy helps the subject pick out a target outfit (which is usually then requested two sizes smaller than the one that was picked). Usually Nadeen, (sometimes Tommy) runs the participant through a five-course, portion-controlled meal plan on what they will eat for the next four weeks.

Tommy begins the exercises by assessing the participant's fitness level with a "drill test". The remainder of the show details the participant's struggles as s/he tries to lose weight. A midpoint weigh-in is featured, along with graphical computer predictions of what s/he might look like in five to ten years if s/he does not change to a healthier lifestyle. Occasionally, a "butt kick" is included in the second half of the episode, especially if the subject has been caught cheating at her/his diet or slacking in her/his exercise. The "final challenge" is the last obstacle the participant must conquer. During the challenge, the participant carries a 10-pound "backpack of burden" filled with unhealthy food(s) that s/he enjoyed prior to enlisting in bootcamp.

== Production ==
The show is filmed in and around the city of Vancouver.

The show also airs on the Discovery Health Channel in Canada.
