= Princess (TV series) =

Canadian television series

- Presented by: Gail Vaz-Oxlade
- Country of origin: Canada
- Original language: English

Production
- Running time: 60 minutes (including commercials) 30 minutes (including commercials) beginning Season 2

Original release
- Network: Slice
- Release: 2010

Princess (stylized as Prince$$) is a Canadian television series hosted by Gail Vaz-Oxlade that premiered in 2010, and ran original programming until 2012 (three seasons). The program is similar in format to her earlier endeavor, Til Debt Do Us Part; however, rather than helping couples in financial trouble, Vaz-Oxlade assists women who are considered self-indulgent and spoiled. Participants are given weekly challenges, some of which are to help bring the finances and debt under control, while others are meant to help correct the participant's attitude and make amends to their friends and relatives. At the end of six weeks, Vaz-Oxlade gives the participant a cheque for an amount up to $5,000, based upon Vaz-Oxlade's assessment of the participant's success in each of the challenges.

In the United States, the show airs on the cable channel Ion Life.

== Episodes ==
Season 2:

№	Title	Airdate	Short Plot Summary
1	"Ashley"	2011·Jul·9	In the series premiere, money maven Gail Vaz-Oxlade meets a young woman who loves to spend her fiancé's money, and now he's in debt because of it.
2	"Krista"	2011·Jul·16	A shopaholic who has separated from her husband three times over the course of their 14-year marriage because of her spending habits.
3	"Lee"	2011·Jul·23	A single woman who treats herself to spa treatments and $800 shoes is more than $17,000 in debt.
4	"Katie"	2011·Jul·30	A 23-year-old nanny who still lives at her parents' lavish home.
5	"Nicola"	2011·Aug·6	A wannabe singer is out of work and out of money.
6	"Kezia"	2011·Aug·13	A make-up artist who owes credit-card companies, relatives and her boyfriend more than $20,000 is given a wake-up call.
7	"Neelam"	2011·Aug·20	A young woman who works in debt collections is in arrears herself.
8	"Laura"	2011·Aug·27	An 18-year-old with credit-card debt is counseled.
9	"Tanya"	2011·Sep·3	A 24-year-old makeup artist owes thousands of dollars to family members and other creditors.
10	"Cortney"	2011·Sep·10	An over-spender who takes advantage of her friends and family is counseled.
11	"Nicole"	2011·Sep·17	A 25-year-old woman who has let her own financial problems affect her loved ones is the focus.
12	"Julie"	2011·Sep·24	A 40-year-old shopaholic is some $20,000 in debt.
13	"Jennifer"	2011·Oct·1	A 30-year-old shopaholic who's been without a home on more than one occasion is counseled.

== See also ==
- Til Debt Do Us Part
