= Til Debt Do Us Part =

- Presented by: Gail Vaz-Oxlade
- Country of origin: Canada
- Original language: English

Production
- Producer: Frantic Films
- Running time: 22 minutes

Original release
- Network: Slice
- Release: 2005

Til Debt Do Us Part (also stylized as 'Til Debt Do U$ Part) is a Canadian television series produced by Frantic Films for Slice in Canada, Zone Reality in the United Kingdom and CNBC in the United States, released in 2005.

== Background ==
It is hosted by Gail Vaz-Oxlade, who each week visits a couple who are in debt and having relationship troubles. The participants are given weekly challenges, some of which are to help bring the finances and debt under control, with the others meant to help the couple's relationship. At the end of one month, Vaz-Oxlade gives the couple a cheque for an amount up to $5,000, depending on how well they did during the challenges. A 52-Week Life Planner based on the television series was released in 2013 and offers day-by-day, step-by-step strategies and tips for successfully managing household finances.

== Episodes ==
=== Season 1 (2005-06) ===
Season 1 Started in 2005

No.	Title	Prod. code
1	"A Life of Convenience"	101
2	"Buy Now, Pay Later"	102
3	"Buying into Bankruptcy"	103
4	"Dancing Around the Truth"	104
5	"Drowning in Debt"	105
6	"No Laughing Matter"	106
7	"Physician, Heal Thyself"	107
8	"Taking Care of Business"	108
9	"The Great Wall of Silence"	109
10	"The Money Pit"	110
11	"The Princess and the Paupers"	111
12	"The Romance with Cash Advance"	112
13	"Without a Safety Net"	113

=== Season 2 (2006-07) ===
Season 2 started in 2006

No.	Title	Prod. code
1	"Back-to-Back Baby Blues"	201
2	"Breaking the Cycle"	202
3	"Driven to Debt"	203
4	"Episode: 2026"	204
5	"Foreclosure"	206
6	"Half-Baked"	205
7	"House Poor"	207
8	"Let's Make a Deal"	208
9	"No One At the Helm"	209
10	"Small Business, Big Dreams"	210
11	"The Juggling Act"	211
12	"The Vicious Cycle"	212
13	"The Wake-Up Call"	213

=== Season 3 (2007) ===
Season 3 Started in 2007

No.	Title	Prod. code
1	"The Mushroom Princess"	301
2	"Taking Charge"	302
3	"Half Baked"	303
4	"It Takes Two to Tango"	304
5	"The Showdown"	305
6	"Love Among the Ruins"	306
7	"New Marriage Old Debt"	307
8	"Gail Force Winds of Change"	308
9	"Life in the Fast Lane"	309
10	"Single Mom Shake-up"	310
11	"Does Daddy Know Best?"	311
12	"He Says, She Says"	312
13	"The Worst Family Ever?"	313

=== Season 4 (2008) ===
Season 4 Started in 2008

No.	Title	Prod. code
1	"Andrea and Terry"	401
Andrea and Terry are raising three kids in a house packed full of stuff. Because Andrea would rather buy fun stuff than pay the bills, they're in danger of losing their home.
2	"Tim and Tonya"	402
Newlyweds Tim and Tonya haven't been able to enjoy their first year of marriage because they're so worried about their massive consumer debt.
3	"Brandon and Tamara"	403
New parents Brandon and Tamara moved in with his parents to save money and pay off bills. But living rent-free in a cushy suburban house complete with a pool hasn't given them much motivation to become financially independent.
4	"Simone and Frank"	404
Simone is a champion shopper who manages to make 53 shopping trips in a single month. Even though she's on maternity leave, a luxury car is next on her list.
5	"Curtis and Andrea"	405
Before boyfriend Curtis came into the picture, Andrea already had a long term relationship – with her horse "Stink." Now that she and Curtis are living together, the amount of time and money that goes to maintaining her horse is a huge issue.
6	"Mick and Bonnie"	406
Mick works in film which means he's either working all the time and making money, or he's not working. Bonnie knows they have to make changes but Mick needs to be on board.
7	"Michelle and Ken"	407
Michelle and Ken got engaged and wanted an island wedding. They realize they need to save for their wedding when Gail arrives on their doorstep.
8	"Evan and Jay"	408
Evan and Jay moved back in with their parents after Evan lost his job. Instead of getting back on their feet financially, they've created a "man cave" in the basement and are furnishing it with expensive electronic toys.
9	"Mike and Maud"	409
Mike and Maud are a happy, go-lucky couple whose laughter covers up their increasing financial problems. Televisions, appliances and pets crowd their home while the bills pile up.
10	"Paula and Jermaine"	410
Between them, Paula and Jermaine earn over $100,000 a year. While their toddler son is babysat, Paula and Jermaine fill the hole left by his absence with shopping.
11	"Rob and Sharon"	411
Rob thinks that Sharon's volunteer dog rescue operation only costs them about $100 a month. The real numbers are just two of the secrets this couple keeps when it comes to finances.
12	"Laura and Craig"	412
Motorcycle mama Laura and her new husband Craig have been on a spending spree for the past year. New bikes, barbecues and hot tubs have been put on credit. Now the bills are in and it's an ugly $90,000.

=== Season 5 (2008) ===
Season 5 Started in 2008

No.	Title	Prod. code
1	"Michelle and Zack"	501
Michelle and Zack have only been married for three months and they've already reached a crisis point when it comes to their finances. Zack's decision to become a full time student has left Michelle holding the bag when it comes to their debt.
2	"Trish and Tony"	502
High school sweethearts Trish and Tony have three children – and a pile of debt. Tony's parents bailed them out once before, but only two years later, their debt is bigger than ever.
3	"Favel and Twain"	503
Single mom Favel thought she'd found her knight in shining armour when she met new husband Twain. Twain hates debt as much as Favel does and together, they plan to buy a house for them and their three children. Before they can get there, they need to start cleaning up the mistakes in their pasts.
4	"Jacqueline and Grant"	504
Jacqueline and Grant are both huge fans of the band Queen. That's where their similarities end. To get their finances in tune, Gail has to slash their spending and step up the debt repayments.
5	"Beth and Steve"	505
Beth and Steve are struggling with a modern reality. Beth out-earns Steve and it makes them both uncomfortable. They're so busy keep track of who owes what that their relationship is suffering.
6	"Innis"	506
Almost 30 years old, divorced dad Innis has spent the last year dodging creditors and crashing on his mother's couch. Gail is just the gal to give Innis the push he needs.
7	"Kristine and Adam"	507
Only 21 years old, Kristine wants the best of the best. Adam spends right along with her and between them, they've racked up $20,000 of debt in only a year. Gail needs to bring them both back down to reality.
8	"Allison and Chris"	508
Allison is a smart girl, studying for her PhD and wondering how she’s ended up in such a stupid situation. Her husband, Chris, had a secret gambling addiction that’s landed them both in debt.
9	"Marissa and David"	509
Marissa loves to spoil her mother, her brother and her mother in law with lavish dinners out and trips to the spa. David is beginning to see that all these treats are taking a huge toll on their finances.
10	"Steve and Bobbi Jo"	510
Steve admits that money problems played a part in the breakup of his first marriage. But that hasn't stopped him from racking up almost $70,000 in debt with his fiancé Bobbi Jo.
11	"Shauna and Nick"	511
After a long distance romance, Shauna left her home in St. Louis to move in with Nick. They spend more time fighting about their mounting debt than they do enjoying their beautiful home. Gail has to get these two playing on the same team.
12	"Rainer and Faith"	512
Rainer didn't change a thing after his parents bailed him out of $30,000 of credit card debt. Only a year later he and fiancé Faith owe even more. Gail has to show these two that denial isn't the only route to a debt-free life.
13	"Robyn and Paul"	513
Newlyweds Robyn and Paul are freaked out by their mounting debt. What’s worse is that they haven’t had any fun since buying their home. Gail has a plan to get them back in the black in only one year.

=== Season 6 (2009) ===
Season 6 Started in 2009

No.	Title	Prod. code
1	"Valery and Alex"	601
Musicians Valerey and Alex make more than just music together – they've also orchestrated a financial disaster. Unemployed, Valerey recently declared bankruptcy but she's going back to school leaving Alex with all the bills.
2	"Mike and Sheila"	602
Mike and Sheila met in a rehab facility and triumphed over their addictions together. But to make up for lost time, they bought everything they've ever wanted. Their dreams for the future are totally out of touch with their finances.
3	"Amy and Paul"	603
Amy and Paul are learning about home ownership the expensive way. Surprises during renovations forced them into a line of credit – and there's still much work to be done. Now they want to add a puppy to the household but haven't yet figured out if they can even afford it. It's time to get their priorities straight if they ever want to sleep peacefully.
4	"Ted and Melissa"	604
Ted is a paramedic, Melissa a cop. Working opposite shifts in high-stress jobs, and caring for two young kids, has left them with no energy to track their money. So they spend, spend, spend. Their healthy joint income is more than enough to comfortably support the family, so Gail's first question is: "Where's the money going?"
5	"Jill and Orson"	605
Owning a house is just a dream for family-minded Jill and Orson. Stuck with their children in a cramped apartment, they live a life where overdraft protection is not a safeguard but a necessity. Jill's financial management is misguided while Orson stays willfully ignorant. Can Gail free them and turn their hopes and dreams into ways and means?
6	"Ed and Brandi"	606
Commercial pilot Ed and chic fiancée Brandi live with their heads in the clouds. But a globe-trotting lifestyle of fine wines and the latest fashions has left them with financial jet lag. With marriage fast approaching, they'll need to change course or prepare for a turbulent ride.
7	"Gord and Angela"	607
Gord has always been happy to let his fiancée Angela take the lead while he plays the clown. Now these expectant parents are up to their eyeballs in debt and Angela is counting on family support to rescue her once again. Can Gail help this couple?
8	"Paula and David"	608
After 18 years together, Paula and David's relationship is at the breaking point, and it's all due to finances. Paula feels exhausted by the stress of trying to manage their money on her own, and David's in debt denial. Once Gail gives David a wake up call, this couple makes money the focus of their vows when they decide to finally take a walk down the aisle.
9	"Karissa and Karl"	609
Newlyweds Karissa and Karl have everything – a new home, two vehicles and a new baby. Because they make their minimum payments on time every month, they're perfect credit clients and they have the massive credit limits to prove it. Will Gail be able to help this couple find the balance between their income and their debt?
10	"Andy and Evelyn"	610
Andy and Evelyn's impulsive decision making has led them from one end of the country to the other. Along the way, they've had to sell their dream house and still ended up with a whack of debt. Gail tries to balance the scales by putting Evelyn in charge of the family's finances.
11	"Dina and Bill"	611
Dina and Bill have turned to their mortgage to cover up some of their money mistakes. They even used their home equity to finance their car purchase. Now they're going to spend the next 25 years paying for a vehicle that will likely only last a fraction of that time. Gail gets the kids involved in her family-focused challenges.
12	"Ivy and Carson"	612
Ivy and Carson haven't stopped to add up the cost of their family-focused lifestyle. Having a stay at home mom and buying organic are important to them, but are they spending too much time thinking about the wrong kind of green? Gail faces an uphill battle trying to get these two to change their ways – no ifs, ands or buts.
13	"Lucy and Dave"	613
Despite a healthy family income, Lucy and Dave have never been debt free. Lucy manages all of the family's finances and she spends it as fast as it comes in. To get this couple back in the black, Gail has to open up the lines of communication.

=== Season 7 (2009) ===
Season 7 Started in 2009

No.	Title	Prod. code
6	"Catering to Catastrophe"	906
After being in their home for four years, Karyn and Mark decided to refinance so they could consolidate their consumer debt and put in a $40,000 catering kitchen. Now this couple owes more on their home than they paid for it in the first place.

=== Season 8 (2010-11) ===
Season 8 Started in 2010

=== Season 9 (2011) ===
Season 9 Started in 2011

== See also ==
- Prince$$
