= Slice (TV channel) =

Canadian TV channel

- Logo used since 2017
- Country: Canada
- Broadcast area: Nationwide
- Headquarters: Toronto, Ontario

Programming
- Picture format: 1080i (HDTV) (2013–present); 480i (SDTV) (1995–present)

Ownership
- Owner: Atlantis Communications (1995–1998); Alliance Atlantis (1998–2008); CW Media (2008–2010); Shaw Media (2010–2016); Corus Entertainment (2016–present) (Life Network Inc.)
- Sister channels: W Network; Showcase

History
- Launched: January 1, 1995, 31 years ago
- Former names: Life Network (1995–2007)

Links
- Website: Slice

Availability

Streaming media
- StackTV: Internet Protocol television

Slice is a Canadian English language specialty channel owned by Life Network, Inc., a subsidiary of Corus Entertainment. The channel primarily broadcasts programming targeting young adult women, including comedy, reality, lifestyle, and true crime programming.

It was launched on January 1, 1995, as Life Network under the ownership of Atlantis Communications. Atlantis was acquired by Alliance Communications in 1998 and Life Network was relaunched as Slice on March 5, 2007. In 2008, Canwest and Goldman Sachs acquired Alliance Atlantis, and the channel's ownership was later sold to Shaw Media in 2010, and ultimately, Corus in April 2016.

== History ==
=== As Life Network ===
In June 1994, Your Channel Television Inc., a company majority owned by Atlantis Television Ventures Inc. (Atlantis Communications), was granted a television broadcasting licence by the Canadian Radio-television and Telecommunications Commission (CRTC) for a channel called YOU: Your Channel, described at the time as broadcasting "programming consisting of documentaries and information programming." The channel proposed programming grouped into five themes, "Habitat" stressing programming for the home and environment; "Bodyworks" covering fitness, health and nutrition; "Food Plus" including programs related to cooking and food; "Explorations" dealing with travel, adventure and nature; and "Relationships" focusing on parenting, childcare, careers and personal relationships."

The channel was launched on January 1, 1995, as Life Network. The channel broadcast programs in themes focusing on such areas as food, gardening, and home design. The success of these strands ultimately enabled Atlantis and its successors to launch dedicated channels focusing on these subjects, HGTV and Food Network, based on the similar American channels owned by Scripps Networks.

In June 1998, Atlantis Communications announced that it planned to merge with Alliance Communications, another television and film producer and broadcaster, owners of History Television and Showcase at the time, to form a new company called Alliance Atlantis Communications. The CRTC approved the merger in May 1999.

=== As Slice ===
Plans to relaunch the channel as Slice were announced on November 2, 2006 by Alliance Atlantis Communications. The new name and programming reflects Life's shift towards a more entertainment-based schedule with what Alliance Atlantis called "addictive" programming. The name was revealed in a 2006 Life Network online survey on future programming strategies. The channel was relaunched on March 5, 2007, although the on-air branding appeared intermittently during a "sneak preview" on March 3 and 4.

On January 18, 2008, a joint venture between Canwest and Goldman Sachs Alternatives known as CW Media, acquired control of Slice through its purchase of Alliance Atlantis' broadcasting assets, which were placed in a trust in August 2007. On October 27, 2010, ownership changed again as Shaw Communications gained control of Slice as a result of its acquisition of Canwest and Goldman Sachs' interest in CW Media.

Slice ultimately became the de facto Canadian home to most reality programs from the American cable network Bravo, not to be confused with the Canadian arts-focused channel of the same name (later renamed CTV Drama Channel). On June 10, 2024, rival broadcaster Rogers Sports & Media announced an agreement with NBCUniversal to relaunch the Bravo brand in Canada in September 2024, and that its platforms would carry new seasons of Bravo original programming going forward.

As a result of the Rogers deal, Bravo originals are being phased out from the Slice schedule in early fall 2024 as ongoing seasons end, and being replaced by reality and true crime content from other producers (including new seasons of existing Slice acquisitions from We TV such as Love After Lockup, and new additions such as The Braxtons and Tia Mowry: My Next Act). One notable acquisition was The Daily Show, which had not been aired on linear television in Canada since it was dropped by its long-time home of CTV Comedy Channel in 2023.

== Programming ==
Alternate logo introduced in 2013

=== Notable programs ===
- 72 Hours
- Below Deck (original and spin offs)
- Big Brother: After Dark
- Big Brother Canada
  - Big Brother Canada Side Show
- Casino Confidential
- Dogs with Jobs
- Ex-Wives of Rock
- Four Weddings Canada
- Friends
- Kendra on Top
- King of the Nerds
- Law & Order: Special Victims Unit
- Love After Lockup
- Mob Wives
- My Teenage Wedding
- Princess (TV series)
- See no Evil
- The Daily Show
- Til Debt Do Us Part
- The Hero
- The Real Housewives of Atlanta
- The Real Housewives of Beverly Hills
- The Real Housewives of Dallas
- The Real Housewives of Miami
- The Real Housewives of New York City
- The Real Housewives of New Jersey
- The Real Housewives of Orange County
- The Real Housewives of Potomac
- The Real Housewives of Vancouver
- The Real Housewives of Toronto
- Wedding SOS

== Logos ==
1995–2003	2003–2007	2007–2016	2016–2017	2017–present
