= Vrak =

Canadian French-language specialty television channel

- Final logo used from 2016 to 2023
- Country: Canada
- Broadcast area: Nationwide
- Headquarters: Montreal, Quebec

Programming
- Language: French
- Picture format: 480i (SDTV); 1080i (HDTV)

Ownership
- Owner: Astral Media (1988–2013); BCE Inc. (2013–2023)
- Parent: Astral Broadcasting Inc. (1988–2013); Bell Media (2013–2023)
- Sister channels: Noovo; Z Canal D Canal Vie; Cinépop; MTV; MTV2; Much

History
- Launched: September 1, 1988 (38 years ago)
- Replaced: TVJQ (1982–1988)
- Closed: October 1, 2023 (3 years ago)
- Former names: Canal Famille (1988–2001); Vrak.TV (2001–2014)

Vrak (stylized as VRΔK) was a Canadian French language specialty channel owned by BCE Inc. subsidiary Bell Media. The channel primarily broadcast live-action programming aimed at 13-to-35 age group audiences.

Launched in 1988 as Le Canal Famille, it was originally conceived as French counterpart of the Family Channel under the ownership of Astral Media as well as rival broadcaster YTV, which was also then jointly owned by Rogers Media and CUC Broadcasting at the time. The channel was later renamed to Vrak.TV in 2001 and then was acquired by Bell Media in 2013 upon the acquisition of Astral Media, while the channel's English counterpart and its sister channels were divested to DHX Media (now WildBrain) in 2014.

As with the English counterpart, Vrak.TV's programming heavily mirrored that of the American cable network Disney Channel, with which Family held a licensing agreement. Vrak's programming lineup consisted mainly of domestic and foreign-imported live-action and animated series from Disney Channel, feature films from the Disney film library, vintage films from other Canadian and American film companies, and specials while it outsourced many of its programs from the United States, mostly from Nickelodeon. After Vrak was separated from Family, the license agreement ended in 2015; Disney then entered into a new licensing agreement with Corus Entertainment and launched new Canadian versions of La Chaîne Disney, along with Disney XD and Disney Junior while Vrak.TV, renamed to Vrak in 2014, changed its audience focus in 2016 to the ages 13–35 group due to the success of its Vrak2 block.

Vrak was originally licensed as a premium specialty service, which necessitated that it operate under a commercial-free format, but allowed it to operate multiplex feeds but changed to air commercials from 2006 onwards.

After being removed from Vidéotron, the channel ceased operations on October 1, 2023, due to declining viewership and having been considered "outdated" by Bell Media, while its former English counterpart was closed on October 22, 2025. However, there are still no major changes to its other English-language counterpart YTV.

== History ==
=== Background ===
==== TVJQ ====
The origins of the channel date back to 1975, when Télécâble Vidéotron, then established in Longueuil and serving the South Shore of Montreal, recently distributed around 30 channels, accessible via a converter. Subscribers had to call to request the broadcast of a video document which would be broadcast on one of the eight channels according to the theme (sports, socio-cultural leisure, senior citizens, students, children, etc.). In January 1980, Videotron acquired Cablevision Nationale, which served the east of Montreal, Quebec City and Sherbrooke, among others. A few months later, the Cablevision Nationale network was upgraded to allow the distribution of 30 channels, while the Inter-vision consortium made up of different cable distributors from the south of the province, set up at the corner of Pie-IX boulevards. and Rosemont in Montreal under the name Cablespec, takes care of the production and broadcasting of eight specialized channels under the responsibility of Jacques Lasnier. The eight channels would have been launched on Saturday, October 18, 1980.

The channel, initially called Enfants et Jeunesse before adopting TVJQ ("Télévision des Jeunes du Québec") in May 1982, presented children's programs produced in Quebec for the most part as well as European, U.S. and Japanese animation series, as much as possible without violence, seeking to eliminate gender prejudice. It was established and distributed by a subsidiary of Videotron.

TVJQ was on the air daily from 6 a.m. to 8 p.m. Since 1979, Videotron subscribers could take turns enjoying a variety of interactive games starting at midnight (via a push-mode telephone), which occupied “channel 26” until the channel returned to the air. The games continued on Canal Famille until shortly after the launch of Vidéoway in January 1990. In the evenings from January 1983, educational and cultural programs aimed at adults were programmed.

From January 1982 until September 1985, the channel broadcast the show Radio-Vidéo, a block of music videos produced by Pierre Marchand, who in 1986 would become the creator of the MusiquePlus channel. Meanwhile, in October 1984, another block of music videos produced by MuchMusic was broadcast, a month after the channel's launch. In March 1986, Videotron obtained a “broadcasting license for the operation, on an experimental basis and for a temporary period, of a cable television network in order to distribute by satellite to affiliated cable television companies in the province of Quebec the service of special French-language programming “Télé des Jeunes”. This license allows Videotron to have its TVJQ channel carried over by other cable companies elsewhere. Videotron thus becomes the first cable company in Canadian history to simultaneously be a producer of television content. CF Cable TV offered Videotron's TVJQ channel from 1987. When MusiquePlus was launched in September 1986, the version received via satellite of TVJQ became MusiquePlus after 8 p.m. with a four-hour live programming block followed overnight 'a rebroadcast or a block recorded during the afternoon. On the Videotron side, MusiquePlus evening programming took the position of MuchMusic while cultural programs aimed at adults were still broadcast on TVJQ until midnight. Blocks of 30 minutes produced by MusiquePlus were added to TVJQ's programming, replacing those of MuchMusic.

In 1986, the channel's spokesperson was Gargouille, an animated character created by Tristan Demers, who would get his own show.

In 1987, Videotron submitted a request to the CRTC to convert its channel TVJQ to a full-service channel while continuing to target youths. On December 1, 1987, the CRTC approved the license application for Premier Choix: TVEC for Canal Famille, and consequently refused the license renewal application for TVJQ. The same day, the license application from CHUM Limited and Radiomutuel for a dedicated MusiquePlus channel was approved. TVJQ remained on the air until the arrival of Canal Famille. TVJQ ceased operations on August 31, 1988.

==== Le Canal Famille ====
The 1988–1995 logo of the channel as Le Canal Famille. A newer logo was used from 1995 to 2001 without the article “Le” in the name.

The 2001–2007 Vrak.TV logo, featuring the channel's mascot, Bibite. The mascot was dropped in 2007, but a simplified variant of this logo was used until 2014.

The 2014 Vrak logo was used until 2016.

Licensed by the CRTC in 1987, Le Canal Famille was launched on September 1, 1988, as a replacement to TVJQ. Le Canal Famille was created by Premier Choix TVEC which was recently partially owned by Astral Media through its subsidiary Astral Bellevue Communications.

Le Canal Famille, name translated as The Family Channel, was also the name of another Canadian youth channel that also began airing in September 1988 and itself owned at 50% by Astral Bellevue Communications.

At launch, the channel carried a few original shows from Quebec including La Garderie des amis, Hibou Chou Genou, Labo Labo, as well as Bibi et Geneviève when the channel signed off at 7:00 p.m. (8:00 p.m on Fridays and weekends) and signed on at 7:00 a.m. Another original program, Mémoire Vive, joined the lineup in December 1988. There were also some shows previously broadcast on Super Écran such as Inspector Gadget and Bibifoc, dubbed Anglo-Canadian shows, prominent former TVJQ series, some Japanese animated series and co-productions. The channel increased the number of its original productions in the following years.

The popularity of Videoway's interactive menus in the early 1990s prompted Super Écran to offer a second choice of films in the evening using Le Canal Famille after its closing at 7 p.m. After about 20 minutes of trailers and self-promotion of Super Écran, the channel becomes scrambled for the presentation of a film.

The heyday of Le Canal Famille was between 1990 and 1996. The channel benefited from a trending effect and produced several vintage low-budget films such as Fripe et Pouille, Les Zigotos, Sur la rue Tabaga and the most popular, Télé-Pirate which benefits from a weekly reach of 400,000 viewers.

In 1994, Bibi et Geneviève moved to TQS. Le Canal Famille kept the reruns, but the competition block became exclusive to TQS.

During the 1995–1996 season, Le Canal Famille changed its logo, attracted more youths on the air, suddenly aimed teenagers aged 12 to 17, and was subsequently renamed to simply Canal Famille. The channel aired Radio Enfer, the first Québecois sitcom for young people, and Le Studio, a comedy sketch series directed by Bruno Blanchet. This momentum continued the following year with the addition of Goosebumps and Generation W.

Shortly after the launch of Canal D (also owned by Premier Choix) in 1995, which offered some vintage television series, Canal Famille similarly saw the addition of series to its programming such as Bewitched in Autumn 1995, Gilligan's Island in 1996, The Flying Nun in 1997 and Family Affair in 1998.

In September 1997, the all-animated Télétoon channel (of which Premier Choix is 50% owner) was launched, offering 24-hour programming focused on cartoons for various age groups. Canal Famille lost around half of its market share, reduced its number of original productions and filled its programming with series produced by Nickelodeon.

To counter-attack Télétoon, Canal Famille broke from its "childcare" image and took a slightly more delinquent tangent. It aired more audacious concepts like Turbulence Zone and Dans une galaxie près de chez vous.

In Autumn 2000, Canal Famille aired Watership Down as its only new feature. The rest of its programming was no longer renewed and consisted of repeats. Canal Famille's market shares among children aged 2 to 11 fell to 8.6% while they were around 25% before 1997.

To deal with the situation, Canal Famille decided to renew its image and 75% of its programming. On December 5, 2000, Astral announced that Canal Famille would be rebranded as Vrak.TV on January 2, 2001, would offer 75% renewed programming overnight (50% new features, 25% new episodes) and would henceforth be in operation from 6 a.m. to 10 p.m. instead of 7 p.m., allowing the channel to offer more mature series for teenagers.

=== VRAK ===
Canal Famille was replaced by Vrak.TV on January 2, 2001, keeping the same channel frequency and still owned by Astral Media. The desire to create Vrak.TV from the remains of Canal Famille would be a success. Audience ratings tripled in six months. The channel switched to an ad-supported format in 2006 to coincide with the renewal of license the launch of its high definition feed on October 30, 2006.

Vrak.TV was separated from its sister channels in 2013 due to the acquisition of Astral Media by Bell Media; Bell sold off Family Channel, the French version of Disney Junior, the English version of Disney Junior and Disney XD to DHX Media, and MusiMax and MusiquePlus to V Media Group.

Vrak.TV was simply renamed to just Vrak on August 25, 2014, and launched a new block, Vrak2, aimed at a teen audience.

On September 12, 2016, Vrak changed its audience focus to the ages 13–35 group due to the success of its Vrak2 block. Some series targeting its former audience focus moved to other stations.

=== Removal from Videotron, closure ===
On August 16, 2023, Vrak and Z were removed from Vidéotron, the company that created the original channel it was based on 41 years earlier, while Bell removed Yoopa from all of their TV services a day later. Yoopa shut down on January 11, 2024, and was replaced by a video simulcast of Groupe TVA's Qub Radio.

Two days later on August 18, 2023, Bell Media announced that the channel would be closing on October 1, 2023, owing to "challenges" in the broadcasting sector, lack of viewers and regulatory affairs considered "outdated" by Bell Media. On September 25, the CRTC confirmed it had revoked Vrak's licence at the request of Bell Media. On October 1, 2023, at midnight ET, the channel quietly shutdown without ceremony after an episode of Entre deux draps. Two years later, its former English counterpart shuttered on October 22, 2025.

== Programming ==
Since its creation, the channel had aired animated series, teen sitcoms and light-hearted dramas. Many of them are French dubs of English-language programs such as Buffy the Vampire Slayer, Charmed, What I Like About You, Degrassi: The Next Generation, Gilmore Girls, One Tree Hill, The O.C., Life with Derek, Smallville, SpongeBob SquarePants, That '70s Show, 90210, Gossip Girl, and many others. It also aired programs from Disney Channel; due to the launch of La Chaîne Disney by Corus Entertainment, the last remaining Disney Channel show on the channel, Bonne chance Charlie was removed from the schedule in September 2016. The channel also featured local Quebecois French-language productions, such as Il était une fois dans le trouble, Pin-Pon and Une grenade avec ça?. Other series that the channel popularized were Dans une galaxie près de chez vous and Radio Enfer. As of 2010, the channel had aired films weekly.

Initially, as required by the Canadian Radio-television and Telecommunications Commission (CRTC), the channel carried no commercials until 2006. However, it aired promotional messages, interstitial programs (such as help segments known as R-Force (pronounced like "Air Force")), and public service announcements instead. The channel aired commercials from 2006 to 2023 with the launch of its HD feed and license renewal. Its former English-language counterpart (Family Channel) continued to be commercial-free until November 2016.

Unlike the other specialty channels, Vrak was the only channel on the air daily from 6 a.m. to midnight. When the station was Le Canal Famille, the station would close down at 7pm (8pm on weekends), sharing time with the flagship Super Écran channel (then also owned by Astral and now sharing Bell Media ownership with Vrak). In 2001, when the channel was revamped as VRAK.TV, its hours were increased to 10 p.m. (Super Écran followed on most systems). Vrak's closedown time at midnight went into effect in mid-2005.

On September 12, 2016, due to the channel's changes in audience focus, its animation programming completely disappeared from the channel, eventually, they reappeared on the channel in January 2017, starting with Bob l'Éponge. By May 2019, all animated and children's programming had left the network's schedule, this time permanently, with comedy following in May 2022; the network's final schedule exclusively consisted of dramas.

=== Former programing ===
- 3 fantômes chez les Hathaway (The Haunted Hathaways)
- Ace à toute vitesse (Get Ace)
- Alcibiade (Snagglepuss)
- Alien Bazar (Pet Alien)
- Allie Singer
- Allô la Terre, ici les Martin
- Angelo la Débrouille (Angelo Rules)
- Archibald, voyageur de l'espace (Mézga Aladár különös kalandjai)
- Argaï, la prophétie
- Arthur
- Aventures dans le monde perdu de Sir Arthur Conan Doyle
- Batman
- Bella et les Bulldogs (Bella and the Bulldogs)
- Belphégor
- Bibifoc
- Bienvenue à Lazy Town (LazyTown)
- Billy the Cat, dans la peau d'un chat (Billy the Cat)
- Les Bisounours : Aventures à Bisouville (Care Bears: Adventures in Care-a-lot) (Also on MusiquePlus)
- Le Pays de l'arc-en-ciel (Rainbow Brite)
- Bob l'Éponge (SpongeBob SquarePants)
- Bonne chance Charlie (Good Luck Charlie)
- Boumbo
- Buzz Mag (The Latest Buzz)
- Capitaine Flamingo (Captain Falmingo)
- Casper : L'École de la peur (Casper's Scare School)
- Chadébloc (Catscratch)
- Chris Colorado
- Cosmic Cowboys
- Croque Canards (Sitting Ducks)
- Danny Fantôme (Danny Phantom)
- Dans la peau de Ian (Being Ian)
- Denis la Malice (Dennis the Menace)
- Derek (Life with Derek)
- Drake et Josh (Drake and Josh)
- Eddy Noisette (Scaredy Squirrel)
- El Tigre : Les aventures de Manny Riviera (El Tigre: The Adventures of Manny Rivera)
- Et voici la petite Lulu (The Little Lulu Show)
- Funky Cops
- Gasp!
- Garfield et ses amis (Garfield and Friends)
- Gil et Julie
- Hannah Montana
- Hé Arnold! (Hey Arnold!)
- ICarly
- Il était une fois… l'Homme
- Inspecteur Gadget (1983) (Inspector Gadget)
- Jacob Jacob (Jacob Two-Two)
- Jessie
- Jeu de Bleue (Blue's Clues)
- Le Diabolique Monsieur Kat (Kid vs. Kat)
- Kitou Scrogneugneu
- L'Araignée (Spider-Man)
- L'Arche de Yogi (Yogi's Gang)
- L'escouade Toutou (Hoze Houndz)
- L'île aux monstres (Nerds and Monsters)
- L'Île de la tortue (Turtle Island)
- La bande des Kung Fu Dinosaures (Kung Fu Dino Posse)
- La guerre des Stevens (Even Stevens)
- La ligue des super vilains (League of Super Evil)
- La Princesse du Nil
- La Vie de croisière de Zack et Cody (The Suite Life on Deck)
- La Vie de palace de Zack et Cody (The Suite Life of Zack and Cody)
- La vie sauvage des frères Kratt (Kratts' Creatures)
- Le bus magique (The Magic School Bus)
- Le monde de Loonette (The Big Comfy Couch)
- Le Petit Castor (The Don Chuck Story)
- Le tour du monde en 80 jours (Around the World with Willy Fog)
- Les Ailes du dragon
- Les amis ratons (The Raccoons)
- Les Aventures de Jimmy Neutron, un garçon génial (The Adventures of Jimmy Neutron: Boy Genius)
- Les aventures extraordinaires de Capitaine Superslip (The Epic Tales of Captain Underpants)
- Les Bananes en pyjama (Bananas in Pyjamas (1992))
- Les Doodlebops (The Doodlebops)
- Les enquêtes de Chlorophylle
- Les Entrechats (Heathcliff)
- Les Fous du Kung-Fu (Numb Chucks)
- Les Graffitos (Stickin' Around)
- Les Jules, chienne de vie...
- Les jumelles s'en mêlent (Two of a Kind)
- Les Mille et Une Prouesses de Pépin Troispommes
- Les Monsieur Madame (The Mr. Men Show)
- Les Pingouins de Madagascar (The Penguins of Madagascar)
- Les Razmoket (Rugrats)
- Les Roltronics (Rollbots)
- Les Schtroumpfs (The Smurfs (1981))
- Les Sorciers de Waverly Place (Wizards of Waverly Place)
- Les Thunderman (The Thundermans)
- Les tribulations du cabotin
- Les Zooriginaux
- Lupo Alberto
- Léa et Gaspard (Lea and Gaspard)
- Madame Pepperpote (Mrs. Pepperpot)
- Martin Matin
- Martin Mystère (Martin Mystery)
- Max le chat (Max the Cat)
- Maya l'abeille (Maya the Bee)
- Mes parents cosmiques (My Parents Are Aliens)
- Mes parrains sont magiques (The Fairly OddParents)
- Michat-Michien (CatDog)
- Mio Mao
- Mon ange gardien (Wingin' It)
- Mon poison rouge ! (My Goldfish is Evil)
- Mona le vampire (Mona the Vampire)
- Mr. Young
- Musti (1969)
- Mégabogues (Reboot)
- Ned ou Comment survivre aux études (Ned's Declassified School Survival Guide)
- Nez de Fer - Le chevalier mystère
- Oggy et les Cafards (Oggy and the Cockroaches)
- Oui-Oui du pays des jouets (Noddy's Toyland Adventures)
- Paire de Rois (Pair of Kings)
- Pepper Ann
- Petit Ours Brun (1988)
- Petit Potam
- Phinéas et Ferb (Phineas and Ferb)
- Pif et Hercule
- Poil de Carotte
- Presserebelle.com (renegadepress.com)
- Razbitume ! (All Grown Up!)
- Robinson Sucroë
- Rock Academy
- Sam et Cat (Sam and Cat)
- Sanjay et Craig (Sanjay and Craig)
- Saturnin
- Section Genius (A.N.T. Farm)
- Sept petits monstres (Seven Little Monsters)
- Shake It Up
- Sharky et Georges
- SheZow
- Singestronautes (Rocket Monkeys) (Also on Télétoon)
- Sonny (Sonny with a Chance)
- Spirou (1993)
- Spirou et Fantasio (2006)
- Stanley
- Super Académie (Sidekick)
- T'as l'bonjour d'Albert (Fat Albert and the Cosby Kids)
- The Big Bang Theory
- Théodore le Remorqueur (Theodore Tugboat)
- Tibère et la maison bleue (Bear in the Big Blue House)
- Tous en slip ! (Almost Naked Animals)
- True Jackson (True Jackson, VP)
- Victorious
- Walter et Tandoori (Walter & Tandoori)
- Yin Yang Yo!
- Zoé (Zoey 101)

== International distribution ==
- Saint Pierre and Miquelon (French overseas collectivity) - distributed on the SPM Telecom system.

== See also ==
- YTV
- Family Channel
