= Denis and Me =

Canadian animated TV and web series

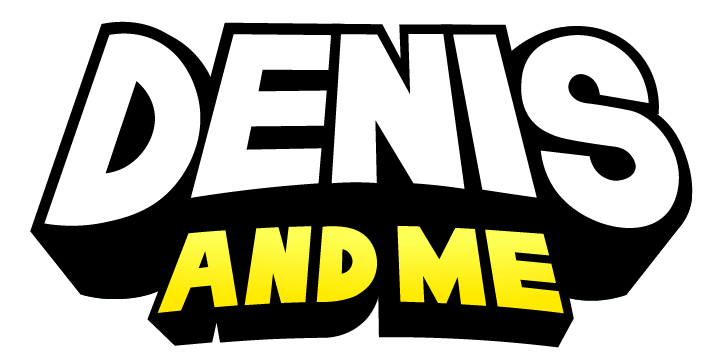
- Genre: Comedy; Adventure
- Created by: Denis Kopotun; Diana Moore
- Based on: Denis
- Voices of: Denis Kopotun
- Music by: Matt Ouimet
- Opening theme: "Denis and Me Opening Theme"
- Ending theme: "You'll Always Be My Friend" by Samantha Karam
- Country of origin: Canada
- Original language: English
- No. of seasons: 3
- No. of episodes: 35

Production
- Executive producers: Diana Moore; Michelle Melanson; Ken Cuperus
- Producers: Luke Conrad; Crystal Hilchey
- Running time: 3 minutes (seasons 1–2); 11 minutes (season 3)
- Production company: Headspinner Productions
- Budget: US$374,612 (season 1)

Original release
- Network: WildBrainTV; Crave; ABC iview YouTube
- Release: November 29, 2020 – October 21, 2023

Denis and Me is a Canadian animated television series created by YouTuber Denis Kopotun and Diana Moore, produced by Headspinner Productions and distributed by WildBrain. It is animated at Cartoon Conrad in Beaver Bank, Nova Scotia.

The series follows about a teenager named Denis, who is portrayed by Kopotun as a fictionalised version of himself, and his cat Sir Meows A Lot. As of 2026, it is running on the Canadian streaming service Crave, and formerly on WildBrain Television's Family Channel starting July 31, 2021 until its closure. The French dubbing of the show, Denis et moi, also aired on Télémagino starting July 31, 2021, and continued until the channel shut down. All the episodes and specials are also available globally on the official YouTube channel.

== Premise ==
The series follows the misadventures of Denis, a teenager who is a fictionalised version of Kopotun, and his best friend and pet cat Sir Meows A Lot. Denis is portrayed as the optimistic straight man who is oblivious to the plans of Sir Meows A Lot, who usually comes up with evil schemes and shenanigans, such as cloning Denis or plotting world domination. The episodes usually end with Denis receiving the impact of Sir Meows A Lot's plots after much chaos. The series features recurring characters, most notably Lady Barks A Bit, a Shiba Inu with whom Sir Meows A Lot retains a rivalry, and tries to get attention of Denis.

== Development ==
Kopotun started his YouTube channel in 2016, uploading comedic gaming videos centered around Roblox and Minecraft. The channel also featured a plush cat named Sir Meows A Lot, who was based on a Roblox accessory.

The show started development in 2018, announcing the showrunner as Diana Moore and executed producers as Headspinner Productions founder Michelle Melanson, and Ken Cuperus, along with Moore. The project was first announced in September 2018 as a development deal between Kopotun and Headspinner Productions, under the working title DENIS and Me, targeting a 6–9 age demographic. Production began in mid-2020, with financing secured from the Canada Media Fund and the Shaw Rocket Fund, and the series debuted that fall on Crave and YouTube. Season 1 launched in December 2020 on YouTube, quickly amassing over 320,000 subscribers and 20 million views.

Kopotun publicly announced it on his channel on July 7, 2020.

The series’ first 9 episodes were budgeted with US$374,612. The Canada Media Fund provided US$16,790, while Bell Media offered around 10 percent of that total, to produce a series bible, scripts, and an animatic. 75 percent of the budget was funded by Shaw Rocket Fund's new Kids Digital Animated Series program, and producer investment and tax credits covered the remaining 25 percent.

The visuals were animated by Cartoon Conrad in Beaver Bank, Nova Scotia, Canada, and the voice acting for all the characters was done by Kopotun.

The first season had 10 3-minute episodes produced, while the second season had 20 3-minute episodes produced. In May 2021, WildBrain and Headspinner Productions announced a deal for a second season of 20 three-minute episodes, commissioned by WildBrain Television's Family Channel in Canada, which also picked up the first season's 10 three-minute episodes for broadcast that summer. WildBrain additionally took on global distribution of the series and management of its YouTube channel, including direct advertising sales, through its WildBrain Spark network. The show reached its second season as of 2022, with four 11-minute specials beginning to air in February 2022 as a test toward longer episodes. The animated YouTube channel associated with the series had accumulated nearly 400,000 subscribers and over 22 million views across its first two seasons. A merchandise line was also launched in connection with the series.

Season 3 has had 5 11-minute episodes produced.

== Episodes ==
A total of 35 episodes have aired across 3 seasons. One of the series' more popular episodes, "Lemonade Stand-Off", was inspired by Kopotun's own childhood lemonade-stand ventures.

=== Series overview ===
Season	Episodes	Originally released	
Season	Episodes	First released	Last released
1	10	November 28, 2020	December 6, 2020
2	20	October 31, 2021	April 23, 2022
3	4	October 21, 2023	December 14, 2023

=== Season 1 (2020) ===
The show's first season had a total of 10 episodes, with the first two episodes released on November 28 and a new episode released each day until December 6.

No. overall	No. in season	Title	Written by	Original release date
1	1	"Lemonade Stand-Off"	Diana Moore & Denis Kopotun	November 28, 2020
Sir Meows A Lot competes with the neighbor's dog over a lemonade stand.
2	2	"Viral Video"	Diana Moore & Denis Kopotun	November 28, 2020
Denis attempts to make a viral cat video out of Sir Meows A Lot.
3	3	"Home A Clone"	Diana Moore	November 29, 2020
Sir Meows A Lot creates a clone of Denis to open a can of cat food.
4	4	"Working It Out"	Diana Moore & Denis Kopotun	November 30, 2020
Sir Meows A Lot goes to the gym to get buff but accidentally becomes a monster.
5	5	"Hairy Situation"	Denis Kopotun	December 1, 2020
Sir Meows A Lot needs to get a job but gets distracted with a haircut.
6	6	"Skunk'd"	Diana Moore & Denis Kopotun	December 2, 2020
Sir Meows A Lot is determined to rid the backyard of a skunk.
7	7	"Unleashed"	Diana Moore & Denis Kopotun	December 3, 2020
Denis buys a leash for Sir Meows A Lot, which turns out to be a horrible idea.
8	8	"Cucumbers"	Diana Moore & Denis Kopotun	December 4, 2020
Denis tries to help Sir Meows A Lot overcome his fear of cucumbers.
9	9	"Snail Fail"	Diana Moore & Denis Kopotun	December 5, 2020
Sir Meows A Lot accidentally steps on a snail and cracks its shell, then sets off to find the snail a new home.
10	10	"In A Pickle"	Diana Moore & Denis Kopotun	December 6, 2020
An army of evil cucumbers shows up at Sir Meows A Lot's house.

=== Season 2 (2021–22) ===
The show's second season had a total of 20 episodes, with two of them split into two parts. Five of these episodes had first aired in October and December 2021.

No. overall	No. in season	Title	Written by	Original release date
11	1	"Scratch That"	Diana Moore	January 8, 2022
Sir Meows A Lot won't stop scratching the couch so Denis sprays it with Slip Away to keep his pal away but only turns the house into a slip-and-slide. Meanwhile Sir Meows A Lot figures out the ultimate way to satisfy his urge to scratch.
12	2	"Besties"	Diana Moore	January 15, 2022
Denis goes next door to play with Lady Barks a Bit. Sir Meows A Lot gets insane with jealousy and tries to outplay Lady Barks A Bit but the constant demands from both cause Denis to crash.
13	3	"Garage Sale"	Jerome Simpson	January 22, 2022
Denis thinks he and Sir Meows A Lot have too much stuff and suggests they have a garage sale. While Denis struggles to make any sales, Sir Meows A Lot easily sells off destructive technology that throws the neighborhood into chaos.
14	4	"Up a Tree"	Jerome Simpson	January 29, 2022
Sir Meows A Lot chases aliens up a tree, then gets stranded at the top. Denis tries to enlist the neighbours to help get him down but nothing works. Denis refuses to abandon him and in an act of solidarity offers to become tree folk.
15	5	"The Christmas Tree: Part 1"	Diana Moore	December 21, 2021
Sir Meows A Lot gets pulled into the darkness of the Christmas Tree, where cats forget who they are and stay lost forever. Denis goes into the tree to find Sir Meows A Lot, but only finds Pinchy, who offers to act as a guide.
16	6	"The Christmas Tree: Part 2"	Diana Moore	December 23, 2021
Denis finally finds Sir Meows A Lot, but he has no recollection of Denis or their life together.
17	7	"Other Friends"	Christopher Yip	February 5, 2022
When Sir Meows a Lot complains about Denis never being home, Denis encourages his pal to try to make other friends by finding someone he has things in common with. Sir Meows a Lot eventually does find his perfect match.
18	8	"Camping Cat"	Kara Harun	February 12, 2022
Denis wants to go camping to practice his survival skills, so he tells Sir Meows A Lot to take a pill so that he doesn't get ticks or fleas. Sir Meows doesn't take it, then right away gets fleas and goes to great lengths to get rid of them.
19	9	"Bubble Boy"	Jerome Simpson	February 19, 2022
Sir Meows A Lot needs a machine part from the store but Denis is too sick to get out of bed, so he puts Denis into a plastic bubble and pushes him to the store, only to forget about him when he gets what he needed.
20	10	"Paranormal Cativity"	Desmond Sargeant	February 26, 2022
Weird things are happening around the house. Suspecting ghosts, Denis and Sir Meows A Lot go full ghost busters until Sir Meows realizes it's actually aliens - and gets the house fumigated, telling Denis it's termites.
21	11	"Be Mine"	Kara Harun	March 5, 2022
Lady Barks a Bit's Denis obsession becomes a problem when she steals all his stuff and then tries to hide it on Valentine's Day. Sir Meows a Lot tries to expose her, so he won't take the fall for the missing items.
22	12	"The Skunk Who Fell To Earth"	Christopher Yip	March 12, 2022
A skunk crash lands on Denis' doorstep with a crazy tale to tell about how he was kidnapped by aliens, then rocketed to earth, then was reborn as a robot, all just to warn Sir Meows a Lot of an impending Cucumber invasion.
23	13	"House Pest"	Desmond Sargeant	March 19, 2022
Pinchy takes a summer vacation in Sir Meows A Lot's sandbox, infuriating Sir Meows A Lot, who then goes to extreme lengths to get rid of the unwanted house pest, only to make him feel right at home.
24	14	"I Think I'm a Clone Now"	Diana Moore	March 26, 2022
The Clone accidentally saves an old lady and becomes a media sensation. Seeing him on the news, Sir Meows A Lot panics and moves fast to retrieve the clone from the spotlight before Denis finds out he has a clone.
25	15	"Cute Eyes"	Kara Harun	April 2, 2022
Sir Meows a Lot stumbles upon a pamphlet for kitten adoption and convinces himself that he's about to be replaced by a younger, cuter cat. He seeks out cute eyes training at the remote Cat Mountain.
26	16	"SMALoween"	Christopher Yip	October 31, 2021
Needing more candy than Denis brought home, Sir Meows A Lot reluctantly agrees to trick or treat for the first time. But when his trick or treating doesn't pull in as much candy as he had hoped, he decides to do things his own way.
27	17	"Countdown"	M.R. Horhager	December 31, 2021
Sir Meows A Lot is determined to stay awake and see the ball drop on New Years Eve, but has to resort to time travel when his enjoyment keeps getting interrupted.
28	18	"Prankster"	Desmond Sargeant	April 9, 2022
Sir Meows a Lot has been pranking the neighbourhood cats again, Denis sends him inside for a time in. Sir Meows A Lot tries to evade his captor and go back outside, but Denis foils his plans.
29	19	"The Trial: Part 1"	Diana Moore	April 16, 2022
The alien cucumbers arrest Sir Meows A Lot for future crimes against the galaxy and take him away. Denis tries to rally help from his neighbors.
30	20	"The Trial: Part 2"	Diana Moore	April 23, 2022
Sir Meows A Lot is put on trial by the Cucumber Aliens and forced to prove he is not evil. He is about to fail, when Denis arrives just in time to save his best friend.

=== Season 3 (2023) ===
As of recent, a total of 4 episodes have aired sporadically, each being 11 minutes.

No. overall	No. in season	Title	Written by	Original release date
31	1	"Roommates"	Diana Moore	October 28, 2023
Sir Meows A Lot accidentally transforms Denis' fish into a humanoid fish girl named Fishy Meowmeow. Denis embraces their new roommate, but Sir Meows A Lot feels threatened by Denis and Fishy Meowmeow's relationship and goes to great lengths to eliminate his competition.
32	2	"Pillow Fight"	Kara Harun	November 18, 2023
Instead of fixing their leaky roof, Denis and Sir Meows A Lot go to Pillow Land where Sir Meows A Lot gets swept up into a fight with a pillow fighting champion. But when giant raindrops start falling from the pillow sky, soaking pillow people and causing panic, Denis realizes it's all his fault and sets out to fix the leak.
33	3	"Santa Who"	Diana Moore	December 14, 2023
On Christmas Eve Sir Meows A Lot sets out his usual Santa traps while Denis goes over-the-top trying to provide Santa with all the creature comforts. Santa evades all Sir Meows A Lot's traps but after a short recline in Denis' recliner, he pulls the lever and it shoots him forward, where he hits his head on the vat of cookies Denis left out, and loses his memory.
34	4	"Five Nights at Pinchy's"	Diana Moore	October 21, 2023
Pinchy is throwing a Halloween party at his Pizzeria. Denis and Sir Meows A Lot help out in the kitchen to keep up with the orders, but Sir Meows A Lot opts instead to cut corners with mad science.

== Release ==
The series premiered on December 4, 2020, as part of WOW Unlimited Media's WOW! World Kids Collection on Crave. WildBrain's Family Channel network premiered the first season in the summer of 2021, with the second released later that fall. Seasons 1 and 2 are globally released on the official YouTube channel, with Canada being geo-blocked.

In Japan, it is also aired on Disney Channel.

== Reception ==
The special Santa Who? was nominated for Best Animated Program or Series at the 11th Canadian Screen Awards in 2023.

== Denis Kopotun ==
Denis Kopotun

Denis Kopotun (born June 5, 1996), known online as DenisDaily and Denis, is a Canadian YouTuber and content creator based in Vancouver, British Columbia. He is known for his Roblox and Minecraft gameplay videos, and is the creator of Denis and Me. He was named to the Forbes 30 Under 30 Social Media list in 2023.

=== Early life ===
Born in Edmonton, his family briefly moved to Nashville when Kopotun was 3 before returning to Canada the following year after his father received a job as a math professor at the University of Manitoba, a university in Winnipeg. Being of Ukrainian descent, his parents had immigrated from Ukraine to Canada; they spoke in both Russian and English to him and his older brother, Nikita Kopotun.

As a child, Kopotun spent much of his time training as a competitive ballet dancer, an ambition he pursued until he was sidelined by tendonitis in his knee at age 17. He has said that his ballet training instilled a personal discipline and work ethic that later carried over into his career as a content creator and entrepreneur.

Kopotun began posting videos online at age 11 as a creative outlet. He has described an early interest in creating things, beginning with claymation stop-motion as a child.

At 17, he told his older brother, Nikita, that he wanted to leave school to pursue Roblox streaming full-time. He went on to enroll at the University of British Columbia Okanagan but dropped out to focus on content creation.

=== YouTube ===
Kopotun rose to mainstream audiences through Roblox and Minecraft gameplay videos on YouTube, where he goes by the name DenisDaily. By the time of his Forbes 30 Under 30 recognition in 2023, he had drawn more than 9 million subscribers on the platform. As of 2022, he had made approximately 5,000 video postings, with his most popular video reaching 30 million views.

During his Roblox gameplay, Kopotun developed original characters, including a cat companion called Sir Meows A Lot, who was featured in his series Denis and Me.

Denis founded a Roblox YouTuber group called "The Pals," bringing together his friends Sketch, AlexCrafted, SubZeroExtabyte, and CorlHorl. The group disbanded in 2019 following a social media controversy involving Corl.

On December 16, 2023, under the video, "My Next Chapter", Kopotun announced his departure from content creating, stating that his focus is shifting towards Roblox game development. Since then, he has not uploaded any video.

=== Business ventures and philanthropy ===
Kopotun serves as CEO of Denis Entertainment. A significant portion of his income, roughly 30%, comes from merchandise sales tied to his content, including products based on Sir Meows A Lot.

His merchandise business was built in partnership with Juniper, a Toronto-based e-commerce company cofounded in 2016 by his older brother, Nikita Kopotun, along with Joel Wegner, Will Cartar, and Ryan Wong. Nikita Kopotun, who had studied engineering at Queen's University and interned at Cisco in China, used manufacturing connections from Shanghai to help his younger brother produce stuffed-animal merchandise after Denis left school to pursue streaming full-time. Juniper went on to work with other influencers and generated $31 million in revenue in 2020. Nikita Kopotun was himself named to the Forbes 30 Under 30 list in 2021 for his work building Juniper.

Kopotun has volunteered with the Make-A-Wish Foundation and, following Russia's invasion of Ukraine, organized a charity livestream that raised over $50,000 for war relief efforts.

=== Recognition ===
In 2023, Kopotun was included on the Forbes 30 Under 30 list in the Social Media category. His Forbes profile credited him with drawing more than 9 million YouTube subscribers over seven years and launching both Denis and Me and an accompanying toy line.

=== Awards and nominations ===
Year	Ceremony	Category	Result	Ref.
2023	Forbes 30 Under 30	Social Media	Included	
