= Tooton's =

Canadian photography retailer

Tooton's Photography Ltd.
- Type: Private
- Founded: St. John's (1905)
- Headquarters: St. John's, Newfoundland, Canada
- Key people: Anthony Maurice Tooton, Anthony Raymond Tooton, Anthony Geoffrey Tooton, Anthony McGrath Tooton

Tooton's Photography, commonly known simply as Tooton's, was a photography retailer in the Canadian provinces of Newfoundland and Labrador, and Nova Scotia, from the early 1900s until November, 1995.

The company was founded in 1905 as the "Parisian Photographic Studio" by Anthony Maurice Tooton (1886–1971) in St. John's. Tooton immigrated from Damascus, Syria in 1903 after studying photography in Paris.

After five years of traveling door to door across the island, initially taking portraits in addition to running his flagship store on Water Street (operated from a half dozen different locations before settling on 307-309 Water Street in 1921), Tooton, at the age of 21, left for Rochester, New York to meet with George Eastman of the Eastman Kodak Company. Tooton's intention was to ask Eastman for the exclusive distribution rights to all Kodak product for Newfoundland, Eastman was so impressed by Tooton that he not only granted him the rights on all Kodak product (a monopoly which would last until Canadian Confederation in 1949) but also the exclusive right to use the Kodak name and marks on all major storefronts and materials, thus creating what would become known as: "Tooton's, The Kodak Store!" These relationships with Eastman and others helped keep Tooton's business up-to-date with photo technology as well as Industry standards. Tooton's passion for photography and acumen as a businessman made the name synonymous with photography, Tooton himself appearing on the popular Ed Sullivan Show. The company continued to experience growth in the following years and became a significant family endeavor. Before his death in 1971, Tooton passed the family business onto his son, Anthony Raymond Tooton (Ray), who grew the company significantly before subsequently handing it down to his own son, Anthony Geoffrey Tooton (Geoff) https://www.thetelegram.com/business/geoff-tooton-remembered-for-kindness-love-of-business-and-learning-286803/, who brought the company to greater heights expanding it into other markets and mediums and continuing to maintain dominant market share.

Plagued by the pressures and changing conditions the photographic industry was subjected to in the late '80s and onwards, and those felt by the Kodak company specifically, Tooton's was forced to close its doors for good in November 1995.

At the time of its closure Tooton's had numerous retail locations in operation in the provinces of Newfoundland and Nova Scotia. Initially it was rumoured that a national chain such as Black's might buy the company's remnants, but this never materialized. Some locations later reopened under a number of different names and owners, but with the rise of digital photography, most of those stores eventually closed for good.
