= Rainbow Ruby =

Children's animated television series

- Written by: Kati Rocky; Phil Harnage; Sharon Soboil; Noelle Wright; Dan Wicksman; Nuria Wicksman; Carter Crocker; Christopher Keenan; Dev Ross; Soomin Lee
- Directed by: Taesik Shin
- Creative directors: Sangwoo Nam; Eugene Jung
- Voices of: Alyssya Swales; Shannon Chan-Kent; Brian Drummond; Olivia Charles; Kate Davis; Johnny Yong Bosch
- Composer: Jim Latham
- Countries of origin: South Korea; China; Canada
- Original language: English
- No. of seasons: 2
- No. of episodes: 52 (78 segments)

Production
- Executive producers: Dongsik Shin (CJ E&M); Jisoo Han (CJ E&M)
- Producers: Narae Ha (Chief Producer, CJ E&M and Lotte Television); Chen Feng (China Entertainment Corp.); Jonghyeok Lee (CJ E&M and Lotte Television); Soomin Lee (CJ E&M and Lotte Television); Junjae Maeng (CJ E&M and Lotte Television); Bohyeon Lee; Noelle Wright
- Running time: 11 minutes
- Production companies: 38°C Animation Studio; CJ E&M Corporation; Lotte Television; China Entertainment Corporation

Original release
- Network: Family Jr. (Canada); EBS1 (South Korea); CCTV-14 (Mainland China); Qubo (USA); Netflix (Global); RTV (Indonesia)
- Release: April 23, 2016 – October 14, 2020

Rainbow Ruby (Korean: 레인보우 루비; Chinese: 彩虹露比) is a Canadian-Chinese-South Korean CGI animated television series aimed at children, produced by 38 °C Animation Studio and CJ E&M Corporation in South Korea and China Entertainment Corporation (a subsidiary of China ACG Group, which is an enterprise directly under the PRC Government's Ministry of Culture) in Korea, and distributed by WildBrain.

== Plot ==
At Ruby's house, a small event related to the main plot of each episode occurs, before a red jewelry on the chest of Choco, Ruby's Teddy bear, flashes with a melody. Ruby then takes Choco to her room, and the two 'transport' themselves to the Rainbow Village There, Ruby hears an explanation from Ling Ling, the mayor of Rainbow Village, and transforms herself using her Rainbow Roller (a rolling suitcase) into an appropriate clothing to solve problems. Each episode concludes, back home, with another small event.

== Characters ==
- Rainbow Ruby (voiced by Alyssya Swales) is a 6-year-old girl who can transform into various jobs to help her toy friends with her Rainbow Roller. Often, she's simply called Ruby.
- Choco is Rainbow Ruby's teddy bear.
- Sam (voiced by Taejoon Kim), he is Ruby's best friend and neighbor.
- Gina (voiced by Shannon Chan-Kent) is a wooden puppet pirate.
- Mayor Ling Ling (voiced by Johnny Yong Bosch), a stuffed elephant who's the mayor of Rainbow Village.
- Jessy (voiced by Kate Davis) is a baby doll who has peach/fair skin, red hair in pigtails with brown eyes, a pink nose, freckles, and rosy cheeks. She wears two yellow ribbons, a yellow tank top shirt with a white collar and a blue ribbon on her neck, a yellow diaper with white polka dots, and pink slippers.
- Princess Kiki (voiced by Olivia Charles) is a sweet young porcelain doll princess.
- Daisy is a young whitetail deer fawn .
- Prince Frederick is a porcelain doll and a friend of Princess Kiki.
- Ellie is a nature-loving stuffed sheep who sometimes glows.
- Thunderbell (voiced by Brian Drummond) is a stuffed bunny playing scooter. He serves as the town's mailman.
- Felicia (voiced by Olivia Charles) is a fairy doll.
- Paige (voiced by Kate Davis) is a stylish paper ballerina doll.
- Mr. Sloth (voiced by Johnny Yong Bosch)
- Chirpee is a wind up yellow bird toy who's Mr. Sloth's best friend.
- The Harmony Family are a family of nesting dolls. There are 5 of them: a father, a mother, and 3 children.
- Poppies
- Miss Swan
- Dino is a green dinosaur toy.
- Nari is a lotus fairy doll.

== Episodes ==
=== Season 1 ===
The series is distributed as 52 single episodes and as 26 double feature episodes. The airings on Family Jr. in Canada are shown in the form of the latter.

| No. overall | No. in season | Title | Written by | Canadian air date |
|---|---|---|---|---|
| 1 | 1 | "Ruby's Ranger Adventure / The Show Must Go On" | Kati Rocky; Phil Harnage | April 23, 2016 |
| 2 | 2 | "Shoe Crazy / Picture This" | Kati Rocky; Sharon Soboil | April 25, 2016 |
| 3 | 3 | "At Your Service / A Hard Rain" | Kati Rocky; Phil Harnage | May 2, 2016 |
| 4 | 4 | "Moon Cake Madness / Trunk Trouble" | Noelle Wright; Phil Harnage | May 9, 2016 |
| 5 | 5 | "Behind the Scenes / Paperdoll in Peril" | Kati Rocky; Sharon Soboil | May 16, 2016 |
| 6 | 6 | "Singing in the Rain / Mail Carrier Mayhem" | Kati Rocky; Sharon Soboil | May 30, 2016 |
| 7 | 7 | "Going Golfing / Case of the Stolen Spectacles" | Kati Rocky; Phil Harnage | June 6, 2016 |
| 8 | 8 | "Up in the Air / Addressing the Problem" | Kati Rocky; Sharon Soboil | June 20, 2016 |
| 9 | 9 | "Happy Feet / Hide and Taste" | Kati Rocky; Sharon Soboil | June 27, 2016 |
| 10 | 10 | "Sleeping Kiki / Babysitter Blues" | Phil Harnage; Sharon Soboil | July 18, 2016 |
| 11 | 11 | "Wakey Wakey / Rules of the Road" | Dan Wicksman; Nuria Wicksman; Carter Crocker | July 25, 2016 |
| 12 | 12 | "Oodles of Noodles / Ringmaster Ruby" | Dan Wicksman; Nuria Wicksman; Phil Harnage | August 15, 2016 |
| 13 | 13 | "A Colorful Way to Cool Off / Seeing Is Believing" | Noelle Wright; Christopher Keenan; Sharon Soboil | September 12, 2016 |
| 14 | 14 | "Bad Hair Day / Ice Is Nice" | Kati Rocky; Dev Ross | September 16, 2016 |
| 15 | 15 | "Big Baby / Public Apology" | Dev Ross; Sharon Soboil | October 17, 2016 |
| 16 | 16 | "A Treasure Lost / Dazzling Dumplings" | Sharon Soboil; Carter Crocker | January 2, 2017 |
| 17 | 17 | "How Does Your Garden Grow? / Mystery Gifts" | Kati Rocky; Dan Wicksman; Nuria Wicksman | January 9, 2017 |
| 18 | 18 | "Train Stopping / All Dolled Up" | Sharon Soboil; Christopher Keenan; Noelle Wright | January 16, 2017 |
| 19 | 19 | "The Rainbow Wave / The Best Pet You Never Met" | Dev Ross; Carter Crocker; Noelle Wright | January 30, 2017 |
| 20 | 20 | "Princely Party / What a Mess!" | Dev Ross; Carter Crocker; Noelle Wright | February 13, 2017 |
| 21 | 21 | "Dolphin Dilemma / Ruby and the Beast" | Dev Ross; Noelle Wright; Christopher Keenan | February 20, 2017 |
| 22 | 22 | "Hat Trick / Dancing on Ice" | Soomin Lee; Dan Wicksman; Nuria Wicksman | February 27, 2017 |
| 23 | 23 | "When the Moon Was Missing / Trouble in a Bubble" | Carter Crocker | March 6, 2017 |
| 24 | 24 | "Home Sweet Home / Mixed Berries" | Noelle Wright; Dan Wicksman; Nuria Wicksman | March 20, 2017 |
| 25 | 25 | "Farm Fun / Tummy Trouble" | Dev Ross; Sharon Soboil | March 27, 2017 |
| 26 | 26 | "Blast Off / The True Jewel" | Kati Rocky; Carter Crocker | April 10, 2017 |

=== Season 2 ===
The series is distributed as 26 single episodes. The airings on RTV in Indonesian are shown in the form of the latter.

| No. overall | No. in season | Title | Written by | Indonesian air date |
|---|---|---|---|---|
| 1 | 27 | "Dino Muffin" | Noelle Wright | July 20, 2020 |
| 2 | 28 | "Paige's Page" | Dev Ross | July 22, 2020 |
| 3 | 29 | "The Butterfly Effect" | Noelle Wright | July 27, 2020 |
| 4 | 30 | "Flower Power" | Robyn Brown | July 29, 2020 |
| 5 | 31 | "Musical Munch" | Dan Wicksman; Nuria Wicksman | August 3, 2020 |
| 6 | 32 | "Sticky Fashion" | Dan Wicksman; Nuria Wicksman | August 5, 2020 |
| 7 | 33 | "Once in a Blue Moon" | Michael Kellner | August 10, 2020 |
| 8 | 34 | "Closed for the Night" | Sharon Soboil | August 12, 2020 |
| 9 | 35 | "Snow No" | Robyn Brown | August 17, 2020 |
| 10 | 36 | "Plumb Crazy" | Phil Harnage | August 19, 2020 |
| 11 | 37 | "Who Let the Dogs Out?" | Dev Ross | August 24, 2020 |
| 12 | 38 | "Hold the Pose" | Kati Rocky | August 26, 2020 |
| 13 | 39 | "Purple Posey Eater" | Phil Harnage | August 31, 2020 |
| 14 | 40 | "The Great Escape" | Dev Ross | September 2, 2020 |
| 15 | 41 | "The Dry Spell" | Phil Harnage | September 7, 2020 |
| 16 | 42 | "Be All That You Can Bee" | Carter Crocker | September 9, 2020 |
| 17 | 43 | "Party on a Cake" | Dan Wicksman; Nuria Wicksman | September 14, 2020 |
| 18 | 44 | "Monster Ruby" | Dan Wicksman; Nuria Wicksman | September 16, 2020 |
| 19 | 45 | "Airplane Food" | Dan Wicksman; Nuria Wicksman | September 21, 2020 |
| 20 | 46 | "Glimmer and Glow" | Sharon Sobil | September 23, 2020 |
| 21 | 47 | "Mayor For A Day" | Dev Ross | September 28, 2020 |
| 22 | 48 | "Fixing Floatiosis" | Michael Kellner | September 30, 2020 |
| 23 | 49 | "Howlerwood Bowl" | Noelle Wright | October 5, 2020 |
| 24 | 50 | "Ling Ling Hatches An Egg" | Phil Harnage | October 7, 2020 |
| 25 | 51 | "Troubles and Tunes" | Michael Kellner | October 12, 2020 |
| 26 | 52 | "The Best Vet Your Ever Met" | Michael Kellner | October 14, 2020 |

== Release ==
Rainbow Ruby was first showcased in the licensing market at MIPJunior 2015 in Cannes, France, as announced in September that year. At the market, the series was announced to be the first animated series to "support girls' and women's education in partnership with UNESCO". On March 12, 2016, at the 2016 Global Education Skills Forum held in United Arab Emirates, the UNESCO and the CJ Group (the parent of CJ E&M) signed a partnership agreement to use Rainbow Ruby: this agreement is a part of the Better Life for Girls campaign, which was launched in November 2014 by CJ E&M and UNESCO, and "a share of the sales from Rainbow Ruby character products will be contributed to UNESCO's global fund for promoting girls' right to education", according to UNESCO.

DHX Media has the distribution rights of the series for Canada, United States and the EMEA regions except France. CPLG, a brand licensing agency which became a subsidiary of DHX Media in 2012, represents Rainbow Ruby worldwide except Asia and Latin America. Within Mainland China, all the related rights of the series are exercised by China Entertainment Corporation.

At a business presentation to South Korean media held on February 28, 2017, CJ E&M announced that the series was sold to thirty broadcasters outside South Korea. Also, the company announced that it will have a multimedia campaign in South Korea involving the series.

=== Broadcast ===
==== Canada ====
In Canada, the series was premiered on April 23, 2016, on Family Jr.; it was then broadcast on its regular slot on Mondays starting April 25. The French language version debuted on April 9, 2018, on Télémagino; for its first week, Télémagino premiered each episode per day from April 9 to 13, but premieres the rest every Monday. Both Family Jr. and Télémagino are specialty television channels which DHX Media acquired in 2014.

==== South Korea ====
In South Korea, the series premiered on March 2, 2017, on EBS1, a public service terrestrial television channel operated by the Educational Broadcasting System. From April of the same year, the series will also be broadcast on Tooniverse, a specialty television channel available on multi-channel television platforms which was acquired by the CJ Group in 2009, before it was integrated into the then-newly formed company CJ E&M's broadcasting division in 2011. Other specialty channels that will broadcast the series include Animax in South Korea.

Previously, it was reported in January 2016 that the series would be launched between March and April that year on Tooniverse, and was reported in July 2016 that it would be within the year, but there have been no indications since.

Season 2 had been released; from April 2 to June 26, 2020, and return had been released; from August 27, 2020.

==== China ====
In China, the series gained a governmental license of approval for distribution in the Mainland television market as a domestic animated production on April 19, 2016, and it was named as one of the Outstanding Domestic Animated Television Productions in the second quarter of 2016 by the State Administration of Press, Publication, Radio, Film and Television, which gives an advantage when selling such programs to broadcasters.

Rainbow Ruby premiered on March 28, 2017, on CCTV-14, where it was given a time slot of Monday to Friday evenings.

==== Other countries ====
The series was also broadcast in multiple countries around the world. In August 2016, outside the original networks, Rainbow Ruby was acquired by ABS-CBN (via Yey!) (Philippines), RTV (Indonesia), Thai PBS (Thailand), Yoyo TV (Taiwan), Duronto TV (Bangladesh), Spacetoon (Middle East) and E-Junior (United Arab Emirates).

In January 2017, CJ E&M/DHX Media secured deals with 10 channels to air the series.

On February 28, 2017, at a business presentation, CJ E&M announced that the series was sold to thirty broadcasters outside South Korea, with ten of them already airing the series.

=== Publications ===
In South Korea, Haksan Publishing published a series of comics adapted from each episode, using the still images from the television series. The books follow the episode order of South Korean airings.

In Mainland China, the Encyclopedia of China Publishing House published a series of story books adapted from each episode, using the still images from the television series. The books follow the episode order of television airings in China.

== Awards and recognition ==
Rainbow Ruby won a Grand Prize in Animations and Comics (动漫类大奖) at the 2015's Zhōngguó Dòngmàn Yóuxì Chuāngtóu Jiǎng (Chinese: 中国动漫游戏创投奖; lit. 'Chinese Awards for Creativity and Investment in Animations', 'Comics and [video] Games') presented by China Animation Association, being ranked at number 7. The ceremony was held on October 1, 2015, as a part of the year's edition of Shenzhen Gameshow.
