= Gaming Show (In My Parents' Garage) =

Canadian television series

Gaming Show (In My Parents' Garage) was a Canadian television series that aired on Family Chrgd, Disney XD and Da Vinci Learning.

The show won a Canadian Screen Award nominee for Best Children's or Youth Non-Fiction Program at the 3rd Canadian Screen Awards in 2015.

The show was filmed in Toronto, Ontario, Canada, and is created by Wildbrain (formerly known as DHX Media) and Banger Films.

== History ==
The show was originally planned to air as a pilot on April 21, 2014, on Disney XD. The show officially premiered on November of the same year. The show only aired in Canada.

== Premise ==
The show is about three teenagers, Jesse, Julia, and Ian, who run a gaming show in Jesse's parents' garage. Each teen goes through a very different experience which involves learning about the world of video gaming (example: how sound is put into a game). They also interact with notable people from the video game industry and learn about their work. On occasion, they get to hang out with video game characters too (example: Mario). Depending on the episode, one of the teens try to prove to the other one's mistake in the consequence they are presently involved in. In the end, the other learns about his/her day and they all agree to have fun.

== Hosts ==
- Jesse Sukunda
- Julia Schwartz
- Ian Duchene

== Guest stars ==
- Justin A Watkins (Thinknoodles)
- Daniel Middleton (DanTDM)
- "Weird Al" Yankovic
- Cast of Pixels
- Tyrell Coleman (NAKAT)
- Richard King Jr (Keitaro)
- Ian D'Sa and Aaron Solowoniuk of Billy Talent
- Colin Mochrie
- Andrew W.K.
