= Harold Greenberg =

Canadian film producer

- Born: January 11, 1930; Montreal, Quebec, Canada
- Died: July 1, 1996 (aged 66); Montreal, Quebec, Canada
- Occupation: Film producer

Harold Greenberg, OC, CQ, (January 11, 1930 – July 1, 1996) was a Canadian film producer.

== Career ==
Greenberg got his start in film working in his uncle's second-hand camera store when he was thirteen. He eventually set up his own film and photography company, obtaining the exclusive rights to footage from 1967 International and Universal Exposition or Expo 67, as it was commonly known in Montreal. In 1973 he acquired Astral Communications (a.k.a. Astral Bellevue Pathe) and subsequently combined it with his own company Ann Green Photos, named after his mother Ann Greenberg. Soon thereafter, it became one of the leading film production companies in Canada.

Astral slowly evolved into a pure play media company and expanded through the acquisition of pay television channels, such as First Choice and The Movie Network. It would go on to become a leader in the field. Greenberg went on to produce Porky's franchise, one of the most successful Canadian films, spawning three sequels: Porky's II: The Next Day (1983), Porky's Revenge! (1985), and Pimpin' Pee Wee (2009). He also produced the critically acclaimed The Apprenticeship of Duddy Kravitz. He is also responsible for the development of Centre De Production de Montreal, which was set for 1989.

Harold was a staunch advocate of the viability of Canadian and Quebec cinema, going on to play a large role in the cultural exemptions included in the North American Free Trade Agreement. He was adamant that Quebec and Canada had its own industry, each having their own, separate cultures. Harold saw that Canada had distinct needs from the United States, frequently scolding industry executive from the United States when they would group Canada (and Quebec) within the wider North American marketplace. Greenberg was instrumental in creating a separate dubbing industry in Canada, citing the nuances separating Parisian and Canadian French.

== Personal life ==
Greenberg was born in Montreal, Quebec, in 1930 and had three brothers, Harvey, Ian, and Sydney, all of whom joined him in the business; as well as four sisters. Harold and his wife, Edith, had three children.

== Philanthropy ==
Greenberg was also a noted philanthropist and was made an Officer of the Order of Canada. In 1992, he was made a Knight of the National Order of Quebec and a Chevalier de la Légion d'Honneur.

Greenberg recognized that there was a demand for well-written Canadian scripts, but insufficient resources in order to fund them. In April 1986, he established The FUND (Foundation to Underwrite New Drama). In 1996, after his death, it was renamed The Harold Greenberg Fund. The French-language program, Les Fonds Harold Greenberg, was also established but was closed in 2021.

== Death and legacy ==
Greenberg died in 1996 and his brother, Ian Greenberg, took his place as CEO of Astral.

Since 1986, The Harold Greenberg Fund/Le Fonds Harold Greenberg has invested almost $73 million in the Canadian film and television industry in over 3,250 projects.
