= Ian Greenberg =

Canadian businessman (1942–2022)

- Born: 15 June 1942; Montreal, Quebec, Canada
- Died: 10 January 2022 (aged 79)
- Occupations: President & chief executive officer, Astral Media Inc.
- Spouse: Linda
- Children: 3

Ian Greenberg (15 June 1942 – 10 January 2022) was a Canadian businessman and media pioneer. He was the co-founder of Astral Media Inc. and served as its president and chief executive officer from 1996 until 2013.

== Early life ==
Greenberg was born in Montreal on 15 June 1942. He was one of ten children of Annie and Abraham Greenberg, who worked as a municipal bailiff. Greenberg grew up in a humble household, and his mother died in 1961 when he was nineteen. He graduated from Harvard Business School's six-week Advanced Management program.

== Career ==
In 1961, Greenberg, along with his brothers Harold, Sidney and Harvey, co-founded what would eventually become Astral Media Inc. They took out a C$15,000 loan from the future father-in-law of Sidney and named their business Angreen Photo Inc., in honour of their late mother. It was initially focused on photographic processing – drawing on the previous work experience of two of his older brothers – and was based inside Miracle Mart department stores. The brothers secured exclusive rights to sell photo merchandise at Expo 67 held in their hometown.

They eventually made their business, since renamed to Astral Communications, a public company in 1974. It took over the Pathé-Humphries motion picture lab that same year, and went on to be known as AstralTech. The company expanded into other business areas, such as the production and distribution of films and television shows. Although its early productions were mediocre, the sex comedy Porky's (1982) became the highest-grossing Canadian movie at the North American box office for two decades until My Big Fat Greek Wedding in 2002.

The success of Porky's enabled Astral to have more room to manoeuvre financially, and the Greenberg brothers quickly divested from film production in favour of pay television. After Harold's death in 1996, Greenberg assumed control of the company as president and chief executive officer. He gradually transformed the company, which had begun as a photographic specialty business, into a pure-play media company (in the 1990s), focused on television, radio, out-of-home advertising and digital media properties. The business was again rebranded in February 2000 as Astral Media.

Before its sale in 2013, Astral Media had over 2,800 employees in fifty cities across Canada. Under Greenberg's direction, Astral Media had grown to operate 84 radio stations, 24 pay and specialty television channels, and over 9,500 out-of-home advertising faces. The company also operated over 100 websites.

On March 16, 2012, Astral Media announced it had signed an agreement to sell the company to BCE, Inc (Bell Canada). The Canadian Radio-television and Telecommunications Commission (CRTC) initially denied BCE's bid to acquire Astral seven months later, but ultimately approved a re-tooled bid in 2013.

== Personal life ==
Greenberg and his brothers were awarded the Eleanor Roosevelt Humanities Award for their exceptional contributions to philanthropic endeavours in 1993. He was a member of the Canadian Council of Chief Executives and a governor of the Sir Mortimer B. Davis Jewish General Hospital in Montreal. He was also a member of the board of directors of Bell Canada Enterprises (BCE) and Cineplex Entertainment.

Greenberg resided in Montreal with his wife Linda. They had three children and nine grandchildren. He died on 10 January 2022, at the age of 79.

== Awards ==
- 1993: Eleanor Roosevelt Humanities Award, co-awarded with his brothers
- 2007: Ted Rogers and Velma Rogers Graham Award
- 2008: Inducted in the Canadian Association of Broadcasters' Hall of Fame
- 2013: Inducted in the Canadian Business Hall of Fame
- 2013: Academy Special Award, for exceptional achievement in Canadian film and TV
- May 8, 2014: Inducted into the Canadian Broadcast Industry Hall of Fame
