= Z (TV channel) =

Canadian French language TV channel

- logo used since 2014
- Country: Canada
- Broadcast area: National
- Headquarters: Montreal, Quebec

Programming
- Language: French
- Picture format: 1080i (HDTV); 480i (SDTV)

Ownership
- Owner: Astral Media (2000-2013); Bell Media (2013-Present)
- Sister channels: Noovo; CTV Sci-Fi Channel; Canal D Canal Vie

History
- Launched: January 31, 2000 (26 years ago)
- Former names: Canal Z (2000–2005); Ztélé (2005–2014)

Links
- Website: Z (in French)

Z [zɛd] is a Canadian French language specialty channel owned by Bell Media. Z focuses on programming primarily from the science fiction, fantasy, and technology genres consisting of dramas, films, and documentaries.

Founded on January 31, 2000 as Canal Z by Astral Media, the channel was rebranded to Ztélé in 2005 and was acquired by Bell Media in 2013, which by that point becoming aligned with English-language counterpart to Space (renamed CTV Sci-Fi Channel in 2019), before renaming to its current name in 2014.

== History ==
In May 1999, Radiomutuel Inc. was granted approval by the Canadian Radio-television and Telecommunications Commission (CRTC) for a television broadcasting licence for a channel called Canal Z, aux limites du savoir, described as "a national French-language television specialty service that is dedicated entirely to science and technology, the earth and its secrets, space exploration, the paranormal and science fiction, lifestyles and computer science."

Before the channel was launched, in June 1999, Astral Media announced its intention to purchase Radiomutuel, which was approved by the CRTC on January 12, 2000 and closed shortly thereafter.

The channel launched on January 31, 2000 as Canal Z (often referred to as simply Z). The channel was renamed Ztélé in 2005 and a new logo was introduced. In 2006, an HD feed debuted.

Astral Media was acquired by Bell Media on July 5, 2013, making Ztélé a sister channel to the English-language science-fiction channel Space, while retaining its other sister stations. Disney Junior was sold to DHX Media, and MusiMax and MusiquePlus were sold to V Media Group, both deals occurring the next year.

As of August 25, 2014, the channel has been renamed Z.

On August 16, 2023, Z and Vrak were removed from Vidéotron, a cable service serving most major markets in Quebec.

Canal Z logo (2000–2005)

Ztélé logo (2005–2014)

== Z HD ==
On October 30, 2006, Astral Media launched "Z HD" (then-known as "Ztélé HD"), a HD simulcast of Z's standard definition feed.
