= Astral Media =

Canadian media company

Astral Media Inc.
- Astral's "lines making an A" logo from 2010 to 2013

- Astral's headquarters at 1800 McGill College Avenue
- Formerly: Astral Photo (until 1990); Astral Bellevue Pathé Limited (1973–1990); Astral Inc. (1990–1992); Astral Communications Ltd. (1992–2000)
- Type: Public
- Traded as: TSX: ACM.A, ACM.B
- Industry: Mass media
- Founded: August 31, 1961; 65 years ago (as Angreen Photo)
- Defunct: July 5, 2013; 13 years ago
- Fate: Most of its assets acquired by Bell Media; Teletoon (now Cartoon Network (Canada)), Historia, SériesPlus, and Télétoon taken under full control by Corus Entertainment; Family Channel, Disney Junior and Disney XD sold to DHX Media (now WildBrain); MusiquePlus and Musimax sold to V Media Group (now Remstar Media Group); Astral name remains in use for its advertising division
- Headquarters: Montreal, Quebec, Canada
- Key people: Ian Greenberg (president, CEO and co-founder)
- Revenue: ▲$1.02 billion (2012)
- Net income: $204.4 million (2012)
- Number of employees: 2,800+ (2010)
- Website: www.bellmedia.ca/advertising-sales/out-of-home/

Astral Media Inc. was a Canadian media conglomerate. It was Canada's largest radio broadcaster, with 84 radio stations in eight provinces. Astral was also a major player in premium and specialty television in Canada, with 23 specialty channels and two conventional stations. In addition, Astral had a presence in out-of-home advertising.

In March 2012, Bell Media announced its intent to acquire Astral for $3.38 billion. Although an attempt to purchase the entirety of the company was blocked under competition law, the CRTC approved a revised offer on June 27, 2013, which saw various Astral specialty channels and radio stations divested to competitors. The sale was consummated on July 5, 2013. Astral was dissolved later the same year as a result of Bell Media completing its acquisition of the company. Bell Media assumed some of Astral's television functions and absorbed some of its premium television services.

Though defunct, the Astral name survives under its Astral Out-of-home outdoor advertising division, though it consumated the former Canadian division of Outfront Media in 2023.

== History ==
=== Angreen Photo and Astral Photo ===
Astral Media's roots lie with Angreen Photo, a Canadian company founded in 1961. It was created when Montreal's Greenberg brothers, led by Harold Greenberg, founded it to operate the photography concession in Miracle Mart, a department store chain. Its acquisition in 1963 of Bellevue Pathé led to photography rights at the Montreal Expo 67 World's Fair, and it eventually grew into a 125-store chain, Astral Photo, the remnants of which are now owned by the Black's Photography chain. The company grew quickly into motion picture processing after acquiring the Pathé-Humphries motion picture lab in 1968 and Associated Screen News Industries of Montreal in 1969.

=== Astral Communications Limited ===
The company was constituted in 1973 under the name Astral Bellevue Pathé Limited. It eventually undertook videocassette duplication and video wholesaling. The company also produced or executive produced over 100 feature films, television programs and television miniseries. The films were released by American Cinema Releasing. The company had operated such subsidiaries as Astral Films, Astral Film Productions Ltd. and Astral Video, as well as in 1987, a development consortium that was led by Harold Greenberg with funding from the CBC called the Centre De Production De Montreal, which is set for open in 1989.

In 1983, the Greenbergs acquired complete control of two pay television networks, First Choice (now known as The Movie Network) and Premier Choix TVEC (now Super Écran), at which point Astral ceased to be directly involved in film and program production. The company would later expand its television operations by launching new specialty networks. In addition, it became involved with the home video and feature film market, lasting from the mid-1980s until at least 1996. In 1987, Astral Film Enterprises had teamed up with Management Company Entertainment Group to produce three feature films by 1988, with the first film slated to be in the co-production pact was Boris and Natasha, Boardwalk, and Villa Golitsyn, which were proposed in the three-picture pact, but the projects, aside from Boris and Natasha were never realized. In 1996, Astral Communications decided to sell all of the program development and distribution divisions to Coscient Group. In February 2000, Astral Communications changed its name to Astral Media.

Astral's "Uppercase A with circle cut" Logo from 2000 to 2010, using the full company name.

Astral then expanded into radio, beginning with the 2000 acquisition of Radiomutuel, and the 2002 purchase of most of the radio assets of Telemedia, although those companies' joint AM radio network Radiomedia was ultimately sold to Corus Entertainment for competitive reasons. Radiomutuel also owned a controlling share of outdoor advertising firm Omni Outdoor (which eventually became the fully owned Astral Out-of-Home division), as well as several French-language specialty channels such as Canal Vie, Ztélé, Séries+, VRAK.TV, and 50% stakes in MusiquePlus and MusiMax (then co-owned with CHUM Limited).

On February 23, 2007, Astral Media announced that it had signed a letter of intent and had entered into exclusive negotiations regarding the acquisition of "substantially all of the assets" of Standard Radio. A formal agreement was later announced, with the proposed transaction being approved by the CRTC on September 28, and completed on October 29 of the same year. The transaction gave Astral Media a significant foothold in English-language radio.

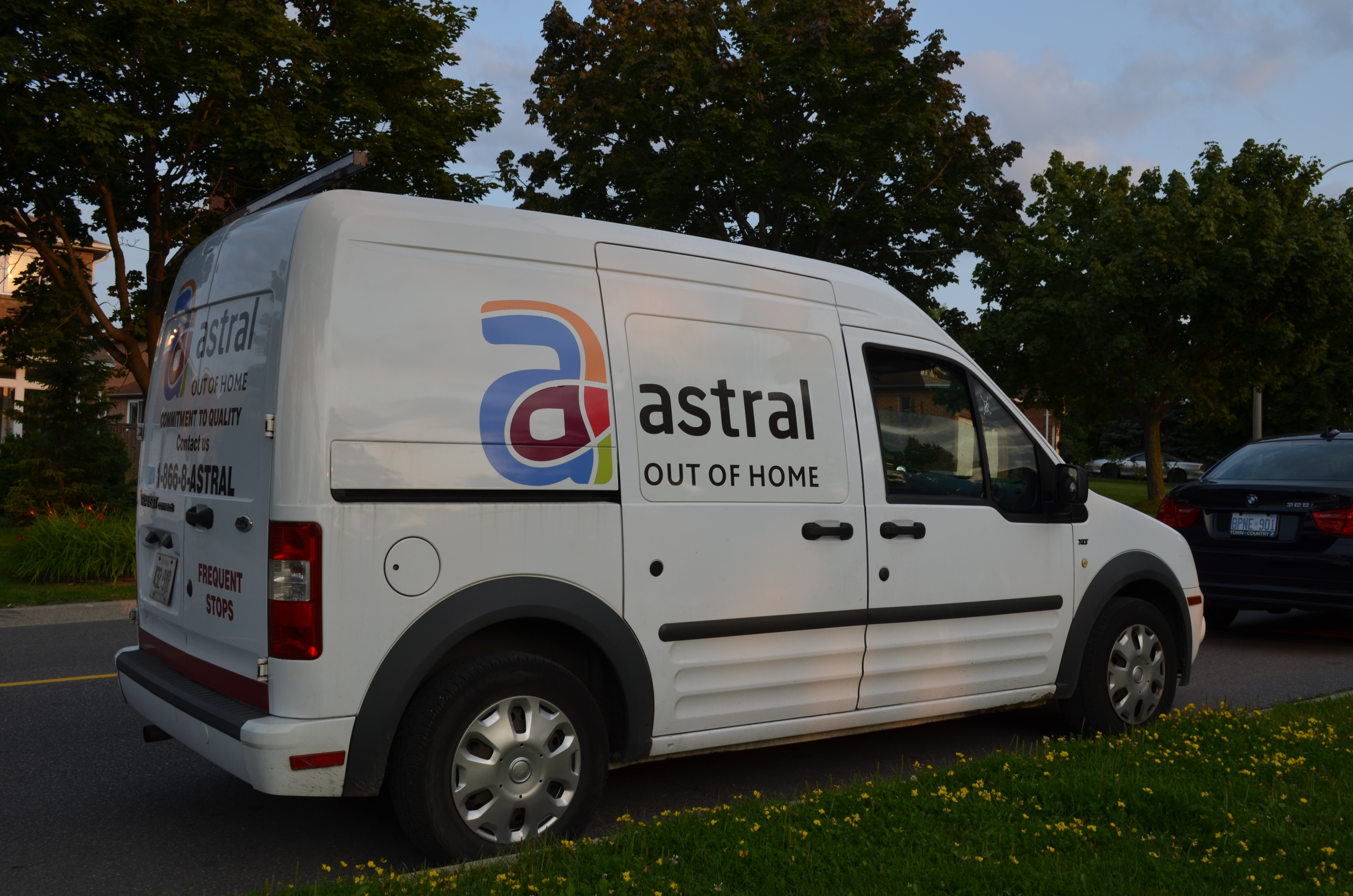
Astral vehicle with the 2010 logo

In 2010, Astral Media relocated its headquarters to 1800 McGill College Avenue, in a skyscraper rechristened Maison Astral. In May 2010, the company unveiled a new logo featuring a multi-coloured "a" insignia (reflecting ideals of "collaboration" and "creativity"). At this time, the company began to trade as simply "Astral".

In the fall of 2011, Teletoon (co-owned with Corus Entertainment at the time) adopted a new logo to reflect Astral's 50th anniversary.

=== Acquisition by Bell Media ===
On March 16, 2012, Astral Media announced that it had agreed to be acquired by Bell Canada through its Bell Media division for $3.38 billion. Astral Media shareholders approved the acquisition of all of its issued and outstanding shares by Bell Media on May 24, 2012; the acquisition of Astral Media's issued and outstanding shares by Bell received approval by the Quebec Superior Court during a hearing on May 25, 2012.

The proposed sale faced opposition: a coalition of Cogeco, Vidéotron, and Eastlink argued that Bell's market share following the merger would harm consumer choice, and that Bell would raise carriage fees for Astral's channels (impacting smaller providers). During a CRTC's hearing, the Canadian Broadcasting Corporation argued that Bell's proposal to use its mandatory tangible benefits to launch a French-language news channel (which would compete with its own Réseau de l'information) was "self-serving and unprecedented." In September 2012, the Competition Bureau stated that it was becoming "increasingly concerned" about the implications of the merger, and warned that it could oppose the deal even if it were to be approved by the CRTC.

On October 18, 2012, the CRTC announced that it had rejected BCE's proposal to acquire Astral Media. The commission cited that their combined market power could "threaten the availability of diverse programming for Canadians and endanger the ability of distribution undertakings to deliver programming at affordable rates and on reasonable terms on multiple platforms", and also stated that allowing the merger would have required the implementation of "extensive and intrusive safeguards" across the entire broadcasting industry. The CRTC also felt that Bell did not adequately demonstrate how having most of Canada's French-language media owned by two vertically integrated companies would improve competition, and how being bigger would allow it to compete against foreign services.

==== Second attempt ====
Following the rejection of the deal by the CRTC, Bell Canada CEO George A. Cope asserted that calling the merger dead was "premature", citing that the formal merger agreement between Bell and Astral did not expire until December 16, 2012, and either company could extend it to January 15, 2013. Bell attempted to ask the Cabinet to overturn the CRTC's decision, but was told that they did not have the ability to do so. Bell also reportedly considered going to the Federal Court of Appeal, or restructuring the deal to selectively sell Astral assets to competing companies. Rogers Media expressed interest in acquiring some of Astral's channels if such a sale were to occur. On November 16, 2012, Astral confirmed that it was in talks with Bell to negotiate a new offer, which would involve the sale of the majority of its English-language television channels to third parties.

On March 4, 2013, the Competition Bureau approved a new proposal by Bell to acquire Astral Media, which would involve the divestiture of certain television channels and radio stations owned by the combined company, and was subject to restrictions preventing Bell from imposing restrictive bundling requirements on any provider seeking to carry The Movie Network or Super Écran. The CRTC made the proposed takeover proposal public on March 6, 2013. Unlike the previous deal, which would have given Bell a 42% share of the English-language television market, the new deal gave Bell a total market share of 35.7%, and increased its French-language market share to 22% (in comparison to 8% before). On March 18, 2013, the Competition Bureau cleared a proposed deal to sell Astral's stakes in several channels to Corus Entertainment in preparation for regulatory approval.

In a speech to the Academy of Canadian Cinema and Television prior to the hearings, Bell Media's president Kevin Crull detailed plans to invest in French-language productions and maintain a distinct operation in Montreal devoted to its French-language outlets. Crull also praised the role of Québecor Média (despite the company being opposed to the merger) in using its own vertical integration strategy to help promote Francophone talent, and revealed his intention to try and emulate its "star system" in English Canada.

===== Hearings and approval =====
CRTC hearings on the new proposals began in May 2013. Asserting that it would have to sell or shut down the station without one, Bell organized a petition proposing an exception to the ownership cap that would allow it to maintain ownership of CKGM, under the condition that Bell maintain the TSN Radio format on the station and provide $245,000 in funding for local amateur sports and scholarships in sports journalism over a seven-year period. Commissioner Suzanne Lamarre commented that Bell could have sold another station instead, given most of the comments on Bell's petition only supported CKGM maintaining a sports radio format, and not Bell's purchase of Astral. In response, Bell's CEO George A. Cope commented that the company did not want to sell off profitable radio stations, and Astral CEO Jacques Parisien remarked that breaking up its Montreal cluster would affect their operation.

Rogers called on the CRTC to require that Bell divest The Movie Network, claiming that Bell would make it harder and more expensive for competing service providers to access The Movie Network's content (especially on its own Anyplace TV and on-demand services) if Bell were to own the service. Bell disputed Rogers' claims, stating that the company already had a long-term deal to distribute The Movie Network on its cablesystems, and noted that Rogers had expressed interest in purchasing the service if it were to be divested. Bell indicated that it would not go ahead with the deal if it were forced by the CRTC to sell additional media outlets. Rogers also showed interest in making a "reasonable offer" to purchase CKGM as a complement to its recently acquired TV station CJNT-DT. Under Rogers ownership, CKGM would have kept its sports talk format, but as a Sportsnet Radio station instead of TSN Radio.

On June 27, 2013, the CRTC approved Bell's acquisition of Astral Media, which closed on July 5, 2013. The deal was subject to conditions, including the requirement for Bell to provide fair treatment to its competitors, to not impose "restrictive bundling practices" on Astral's premium movie channels, invest $246.9 million over the next seven years on Canadian-produced programming, and to maintain the operation and local programming levels of all of its television stations through 2017. The CRTC also approved Bell's proposed exemptions for maintaining ownership of CKGM.

===== Divestments =====
Following the approval of the new proposal by the Competition Bureau, Corus Entertainment reached a tentative deal to acquire 2 radio stations (CJOT, CKQB), along with Astral's stakes in Historia, Séries+, and the Teletoon networks from Bell for just over $400 million. Corus acquired the stakes in Historia and Séries+ from Shaw Media as well. On January 1, 2014, the acquisition was completed. In 2017, Corus attempted to sell Historia and Séries+ to Bell for $200 million, but the deal was blocked and rejected by the Competition Bureau for violations of conditions forbidding Bell from re-acquiring divested Astral properties for ten years.

Bell Media also divested Family, Disney Junior's English and French services, Disney XD, MusiMax, MusiquePlus, and 5 other radio stations in Toronto and Vancouver (CHBM-FM, CFXJ-FM, CKZZ-FM, CHHR-FM and CISL) at auction. These divested stations and channels were temporarily held in a blind trust by Pierre Boivin until the completion of their acquisitions.

On May 16, 2013, the Jim Pattison Group announced a deal to acquire three stations in Calgary and Winnipeg from Bell and Astral—CKCE-FM, CHIQ-FM, and CFQX, for an undisclosed amount. The deal expanded the Jim Pattison Group's operations in Calgary (where it was planning to launch a new station, CHPK-FM), and gave the company its first stations in Manitoba. On August 26, 2013, Newcap Radio announced its intent to acquire the five aforementioned Toronto and Vancouver stations. Eventually, Newcap was in turn acquired by Stingray Digital Group in 2018.

On November 28, 2013, DHX Media announced that it had reached a deal to acquire Family Channel and its sister networks for $170 million, the deal was completed in late July 2014. On December 4, 2013, Remstar, owners of the French television system V, announced that it would acquire MusiquePlus and MusiMax for an undisclosed amount.

== Corporate governance ==
Members of the board of directors of Astral prior to the close of the Bell-Astral transaction were: Austin Beutel, Paul Bronfman, André Bureau (chairman), Jack Cockwell, George Cohon, Paul Godfrey, Stephen Greenberg, Ian Greenberg, Sidney Greenberg, Sidney Horn, Timothy Price, Phyllis Yaffe and Monique Jérôme-Forget.

== Former assets ==
Any listing with a cross (†) character at the end indicates an asset which was not acquired by Bell Canada.

=== Radio ===
==== Alberta ====
- Calgary - CIBK, CJAY, CKMX, CKCE-FM
- Edmonton - CFBR, CFRN, CFMG

==== British Columbia ====
- Dawson Creek - CJDC
- Fort Nelson - CKRX
- Fort St. John - CHRX, CKNL
- Golden - CKGR
- Invermere - CKIR
- Kelowna - CHSU, CILK, CKFR
- Kitimat - CKTK
- Nelson - CKKC
- Osoyoos - CJOR
- Penticton - CJMG, CKOR
- Prince Rupert - CHTK
- Princeton - CIOR
- Revelstoke - CKCR
- Salmon Arm - CKXR
- Summerland - CHOR
- Terrace - CFTK, CJFW
- Trail - CJAT
- Vancouver - CKZZ †, CHHR †, CISL †
- Vernon - CICF

==== Manitoba ====
- Brandon - CKX, CKXA
- Selkirk - CFQX †
- Winnipeg - CKMM

==== New Brunswick ====
- Bathurst - CKBC-FM
- Fredericton - CFXY-FM, CIBX-FM, CKHJ
- Grand Falls - CIKX-FM
- Woodstock - CJCJ-FM

==== Nova Scotia ====
- Truro - CKTO-FM, CKTY-FM

==== Ontario ====
- Hamilton - CHAM, CKLH, CKOC
- London - CIQM, CJBK, CJBX, CKSL
- Ottawa - CJOT †, CKQB †
- Pembroke - CHVR
- St. Catharines - CHRE, CHTZ, CKTB
- Toronto - CFRB, CHBM †, CKFM

==== Quebec ====
- Montreal - CHOM, CJAD, CJFM

===== NRJ network =====
- CHIK-FM 98.9, Quebec City
- CIGB-FM 102.3, Trois-Rivières / Mauricie
- CIKI-FM 98.7, Rimouski
- CIMO-FM 106.1, Magog / Estrie
- CJAB-FM 94.5, Saguenay
- CJDM-FM 92.1, Drummondville
- CJMM-FM 99.1, Rouyn-Noranda
- CJMV-FM 102.7, Val-d'Or
- CKMF-FM 94.3, Montreal
- CKTF-FM 104.1, Gatineau / Outaouais

===== Rouge FM network =====
- CFIX-FM 96.9, Saguenay
- CFVM-FM 99.9, Amqui
- CHEY-FM 94.7, Trois-Rivières / Mauricie
- CHRD-FM 105.3, Drummondville
- CIMF-FM 94.9, Gatineau / Outaouais
- CITE-FM 107.3, Montreal
- CITE-FM-1 102.7, Sherbrooke / Estrie
- CITF-FM 107.5, Quebec City
- CJOI-FM 102.9, Rimouski

===== Boom FM network =====
- CFEI-FM 106.5, Saint-Hyacinthe
- CFZZ-FM 104.1, Saint-Jean-sur-Richelieu

==== Saskatchewan ====
- Regina - CHBD

=== Television ===
==== Over-the-air television stations ====
- Dawson Creek - CJDC (now owned by Bell Media, reverted from CBC Television affiliation to CTV 2 affiliation in 2016)
- Terrace - CFTK (now owned by Bell Media, reverted from CBC Television affiliation to CTV 2 affiliation in 2016)

==== Specialty & pay television (English) ====
- Family - 2 multiplex channels (now owned by WildBrain, later shut down on October 22, 2025.)
  - Disney Junior (English) (renamed Family Jr. by owner DHX Media after DHX lost the rights to Disney Channel programming to Corus, later shut down on October 22, 2025.)
- Disney XD (renamed Family Chrgd by owner DHX Media after DHX lost the rights to Disney Channel programming to Corus, but eventually rebranded to WildBrainTV on March 1, 2022, with no change in programming, later shut down on October 22, 2025.)
- The Movie Network - 4 multiplex channels, including HBO Canada (now owned by Bell Media and renamed Crave as of November 1, 2018)
  - MExcess - renamed TMN 2 in 2016 and later Crave 2 in 2018
  - MFun! - renamed TMN 3 in 2016 and later Crave 3 in 2018
  - MFest - ceased operations March 1, 2016
- The Movie Network Encore - 2 multiplex channels (renamed Starz by new owner Bell Media in 2019)
- Teletoon (now fully owned by Corus Entertainment as of January 1, 2014, rebranded to Cartoon Network on March 27, 2023)
  - Teletoon Retro (shut down on September 1, 2015, license and carriage subsumed by Cartoon Network)
  - Cartoon Network (ceased operating as a separately-licensed service on September 1, 2015, moving under Teletoon Retro's license thereafter, relaunched as Boomerang on March 27, 2023)

==== Specialty & pay television (French) ====
- Canal D (now owned by Bell Media)
  - Upcoming spin-off channel focusing on justice and forensic programming in the form of documentaries, magazine series, dramas and reality television series (launched by Bell Media as Canal D/Investigation on December 12, 2013, following the Astral Media acquisition before renaming itself to just Investigation)
- Canal Vie (now owned by Bell Media)
- Cinépop (now owned by Bell Media)
- Disney Junior (French) (renamed Télémagino by owner DHX Media after DHX lost the rights to Disney Channel programming to Corus, later shut down on October 22, 2025.)
- Historia (now fully owned by Corus Entertainment as of January 1, 2014)
- MusiMax (now owned by V Media Group, later became a general entertainment channel now known as Max)
- MusiquePlus (now owned by V Media Group, and renamed Elle Fictions as of 2019)
- Séries+ (now fully owned by Corus Entertainment as of January 1, 2014)
- Super Écran - 4 multiplex channels (now owned by Bell Media)
- Télétoon (now fully owned by Corus Entertainment as of January 1, 2014)
  - Télétoon Rétro (shut down on September 1, 2015, and replaced by Disney La Chaîne in its channel allotments under Corus ownership, later shut down on September 1, 2025.)
- Vrak.TV (later owned by Bell Media and renamed to Vrak, shut down on October 1, 2023)
- Ztélé (now owned by Bell Media and known as Z)

==== Pay-per-view television ====
- Viewers Choice (50.1%, shut down on September 30, 2014, due to redundancy with Bell and Rogers PPV services, Vu! and Sportsnet PPV)

== See also ==
- Media ownership in Canada
