= WildBrainTV =

Closed pay television channel in Canada

- Final logo used from March 1, 2022 to October 23, 2025.
- Country: Canada
- Broadcast area: Nationwide
- Headquarters: Toronto, Ontario

Programming
- Picture format: 1080i HDTV (downscaled to letterboxed 480i for the SDTV feed)

Ownership
- Owner: Astral Media (2011–2013); Bell Media (2013–2014) (Note: Bell's ownership was short-lived, as with its sister channels.); WildBrain (2014–2025)
- Sister channels: Family Channel; Family Jr.; Télémagino

History
- Launched: June 1, 2011; 15 years ago
- Closed: October 23, 2025; 12 months ago
- Former names: Disney XD (2011–2015); Family CHRGD (2015–2022)

Links
- Website: www.wildbraintv.com (defunct)

WildBrainTV (formerly Family CHRGD) was a Canadian English language discretionary specialty channel owned by WildBrain. WildBrainTV broadcast live-action and animated children's programming aimed towards audiences ages 6–15. Its name came from its owner, WildBrain.

The channel first launched on June 1, 2011, under the ownership of Astral Media. It initially operated as a localized version of Disney XD, under license from Disney Channels Worldwide, as a sister network to Family Channel. Following the acquisition of Astral Media by Bell Media, Disney XD was divested to DHX Media (now WildBrain) in 2014.

In 2015, Corus Entertainment acquired the rights to programming from Disney Channel and its siblings (later launching a new Canadian Disney XD channel), resulting in DHX's existing Disney XD channel being rebranded as Family CHRGD (a brand extension of Family Channel with a similar positioning) in October 2015. The channel adopted its final branding on March 1, 2022, and it shut down on October 23, 2025.

== History ==
=== As Disney XD (2011–2015) ===
Disney XD logo used from June 1, 2011 to October 9, 2015

In April 2009, Astral Media, through its subsidiary The Family Channel Inc., was granted CRTC approval for a new category 2 service under the working name "Family Extreme". The new service would feature "programming from around the world devoted to entertainment, humour, travel, games, science and technology and targeted toward children aged 6 to 17 years and their families". Astral later announced that it would launch a Canadian version of Disney XD on June 1, 2011. Operating under the Family Extreme license, the service expanded upon Family's relationship as a licensee of Disney Channel programming.

In 2012, the channel premiered its first original series, Slugterra. After the Competition Bureau approved Bell Media's acquisition of Astral, Bell announced on March 4, 2013, that Disney XD, as well as its sister networks and Astral's French-language MusiquePlus and MusiMax would be divested. On October 27, 2013, the channel premiered its first original movie, Bunks, produced by Fresh TV.

On November 28, 2013, DHX Media announced that it would acquire Disney XD and its sister networks for $170 million. The acquisition was approved by the CRTC on July 24, 2014, and closed on July 31, 2014.

In that same year, Disney XD premiered the pilot for Fangbone!, in May, and a new original series, Gaming Show (In My Parents' Garage), in November.

=== As Family CHRGD/WildBrainTV (2015–2025) ===
Family CHRGD logo, which was used from October 9, 2015, to March 1, 2022

On April 16, 2015, it was announced that Corus Entertainment had acquired Canadian rights to Disney Channel's program library; alongside the launch of a Canadian version of Disney Channel, Corus stated that it would launch other Disney branded channels in the future, which eventually included a new Disney XD. In anticipation for this transition, DHX concurrently announced that its Disney-branded networks would be rebranded as spin-offs of Family Channel by November 2015, with Disney XD tentatively being rebranded as Family XTRM.

On August 20, 2015, DHX announced the fall lineups for its networks, revealing the official rebranding for Disney XD as Family CHRGD. Its lineup was to feature new seasons of the network's existing original series, in addition to new shows produced by DHX subsidiaries and other studios (such as the aforementioned Fangbone!), as well as new program supply agreements with Mattel, and later in the year, DreamWorks Animation. The rebranding occurred on October 9, 2015.

On March 1, 2022, Family CHRGD rebranded as WildBrainTV, with no change in programming.

=== Closure (2025) ===
On December 18, 2024, WildBrain announced that it would sell a two-thirds majority stake of its television operations (including Family Channel) to IoM Media Ventures, a Halifax-based company founded by former WildBrain CEO Dana Landry.

In April 2025, WildBrain stated that it would be renegotiating aspects of the agreement, citing factors such as a decision by Bell Canada not to renew its carriage agreements for WildBrain's channels.

On August 25, 2025, WildBrain announced that it was unable to renew its carriage agreements with Rogers Cable. It therefore announced plans to close all of its specialty channels in the near future, as the decline in these carriage agreements meant the channels had lost most of their value and were "no longer commercially viable". All four networks shut down at 5:59 a.m. Eastern on October 23, though some providers stopped their carriage of the channels at midnight several hours earlier. On October 31, 2025, the CRTC confirmed it had revoked WildBrainTV's licence at the request of WildBrain.

== Programming ==
=== Final programming ===
==== Canadian productions ====
- Are You Afraid of the Dark?
- Carmen Sandiego (November 5, 2022 – October 22, 2025)
- Denis and Me (November 16, 2021 – October 22, 2025)
- The Deep (January 1, 2016 – October 22, 2025)
- Goosebumps
- Inspector Gadget (2018 – October 22, 2025)
- Johnny Test (February 5, 2018 – October 22, 2025)
- The Latest Buzz
- Naturally, Sadie
- Slugterra (September 3, 2012 – October 22, 2025)
- Summer Memories (2022 – October 22, 2025)
- Supernoobs (November 30, 2020 – October 22, 2025)
- Survivalists (2021 – October 22, 2025)

==== Acquired programming ====
- Alvinnn!!! and the Chipmunks (2018–2025)
- American Ninja Warrior Junior (2023-2024)
- Boy Girl Dog Cat Mouse Cheese (September 22, 2021–October 22, 2025)
- Cleopatra in Space (January 9, 2021 – October 22, 2025)
- Dwight in Shining Armor
- Grizzy & the Lemmings
- The Epic Tales of Captain Underpants (June 20, 2020 – October 22, 2025)
- Harvey Girls Forever! (March 7, 2020 – 2022; 2024-2025)
- Saving Me
- The Smurfs (February 19, 2022 – October 22, 2025)
- Supergirl (August 4, 2020 – October 22, 2025)

=== Former programming ===
==== As Disney XD (2011–2015) ====
Programs in bold indicate that programming were moved to the new incarnation of Disney XD.

- The 7D (2014–2015)
- Aaron Stone
- American Dragon: Jake Long
- Baxter
- Crash & Bernstein
- Doraemon
- The Emperor's New School
- Even Stevens
- Fantastic Four
- Fish Hooks
- Gargoyles
- Gravity Falls (2013–2015)
- I'm in the Band
- Iron Man
- Jessie
- Kick Buttowski: Suburban Daredevil (2011–2014)
- Kirby Buckets (2014–2015)
- Lab Rats
- The Legend of Tarzan (2011–2013)
- Motorcity
- Pair of Kings (2011–2015)
- The Replacements
- Spider-Man
- Star Wars Rebels (2014–2015)
- Star vs. the Forces of Evil (2015)
- The Suite Life of Zack & Cody
- The Suite Life on Deck (2011–2015)
- Tron: Uprising
- Wander Over Yonder (2013–2015)
- Wizards of Waverly Place
- X-Men
- Yo Gabba Gabba!
- Yin Yang Yo! (2011–2012)
- Zeke and Luther

==== As Family CHRGD (2015–2022) ====
- Are You Smarter than a 5th Grader?
- Bajillionaires (March 29, 2021 – 2022?)
- Be the Creature
- Creeped Out (September 9, 2019 – 2021)
- Degrassi: Next Class
- Dinotrux
- Dr. Ken
- DreamWorks Dragons
- DreamWorksTV
- Fangbone!
- Fort Boyard: Ultimate Challenge (2011–2015)
- The Fresh Prince of Bel-Air
- Gaming Show (In My Parents' Garage)
- Hank Zipzer (January 2, 2016 – 2021)
- Heads Up!
- The Haunting Hour: The Series
- Iron Man
- Just Like Mom and Dad
- **Kickin' It** (2011-2015)
- Lego Star Wars: Droid Tales
- Life with Derek (2011–2015)
- Mega Man: Fully Charged (September 8, 2018 – 2021?)
- **Mighty Med** (2013–2015)
- My Knight and Me
- My Side of the Sky
- Nature Cat
- Overruled!
- **Penn Zero: Part-Time Hero** (2015)
- **Phineas and Ferb** (2011–2015)
- **Randy Cunningham: 9th Grade Ninja** (2012–2015)
- Sonic Boom
- Speechless
- Trollhunters: Tales of Arcadia (January 12, 2019 – 2021)
- Storm Hawks
- Voltron: Legendary Defender (July 22, 2018 – 202?)
- What's Up Warthogs!
- Wingin' It (2011–2016)
- World of Quest
- Xiaolin Chronicles
- Zak Storm
- The Zoo

==== As WildBrainTV (2022–2025) ====
- The Adventures of Puss in Boots (June 18, 2017 – 2022)
- All Hail King Julien (April 24, 2017 – 2022)
- The Bureau of Magical Things (2022)
- Dawn of the Croods (January 7, 2019 – 2022)
- Dorg Van Dango (2022)
- Home: Adventures with Tip & Oh
- The InBESTigators (March 10, 2022 – 2023)
- Itch
- Lego Jurassic World: Legend of Isla Nublar (2020–2022)
- Massive Monster Mayhem (January 14, 2018 – 2022)
- Mighty Mike (December 2, 2019 – 2022)
- The Mr. Peabody & Sherman Show (November 3, 2018 – 2022)
- Nowhere Boys (January 24, 2016 – 2022)
- Pac-Man and the Ghostly Adventures (March 17, 2014 – 2022)
- Radio Free Roscoe (April 2017 – 2022)
- Rainbow Butterfly Unicorn Kitty (May 1, 2021 – 2022)
- She-Ra and the Princesses of Power (July 18, 2020 – 2022)
- Turbo Fast (June 14, 2016 – 2022)
- Wallace & Gromit's Cracking Contraptions (2022)
- Where's Waldo? (January 23, 2021 – 2023) (Moved to Family Jr.)

== See also ==
- List of Canadian television channels
