= Blacks Photo Corporation =

Canadian online retailer

Blacks Photography
- Type: Subsidiary
- Industry: Retail; E-commerce
- Founded: 1930; 96 years ago Toronto, Ontario, Canada
- Founder: Eddie Black
- Headquarters: Montreal, Quebec, Canada
- Key people: John Johnson, Vice President
- Products: Photofinishing
- Parent: Scott's Hospitality (1985–1993); Fujifilm (1993–2007); Telus (2009–2015); Les Pros de la Photo (2015–present)
- Website: www.blacks.ca

Blacks Photography, stylized as BLACK^{S} (formerly Black's), is a Canadian online retailer of photo prints and personalized photo products, home decor items, and photofinishing services. It is headquartered in Montreal, Quebec, Canada.

Prior to 2015, Blacks was a brick and mortar retail chain focusing on photography equipment and processing since 1939. However, due to declining business in part to the rise of digital photography and camera phones, the chain closed on August 4, 2015. Blacks' domain and app assets were sold to Montreal-based Les Pros de la Photo, Canada's largest wholesale photofinisher, which has taken over and operates it as an online business.

== History ==
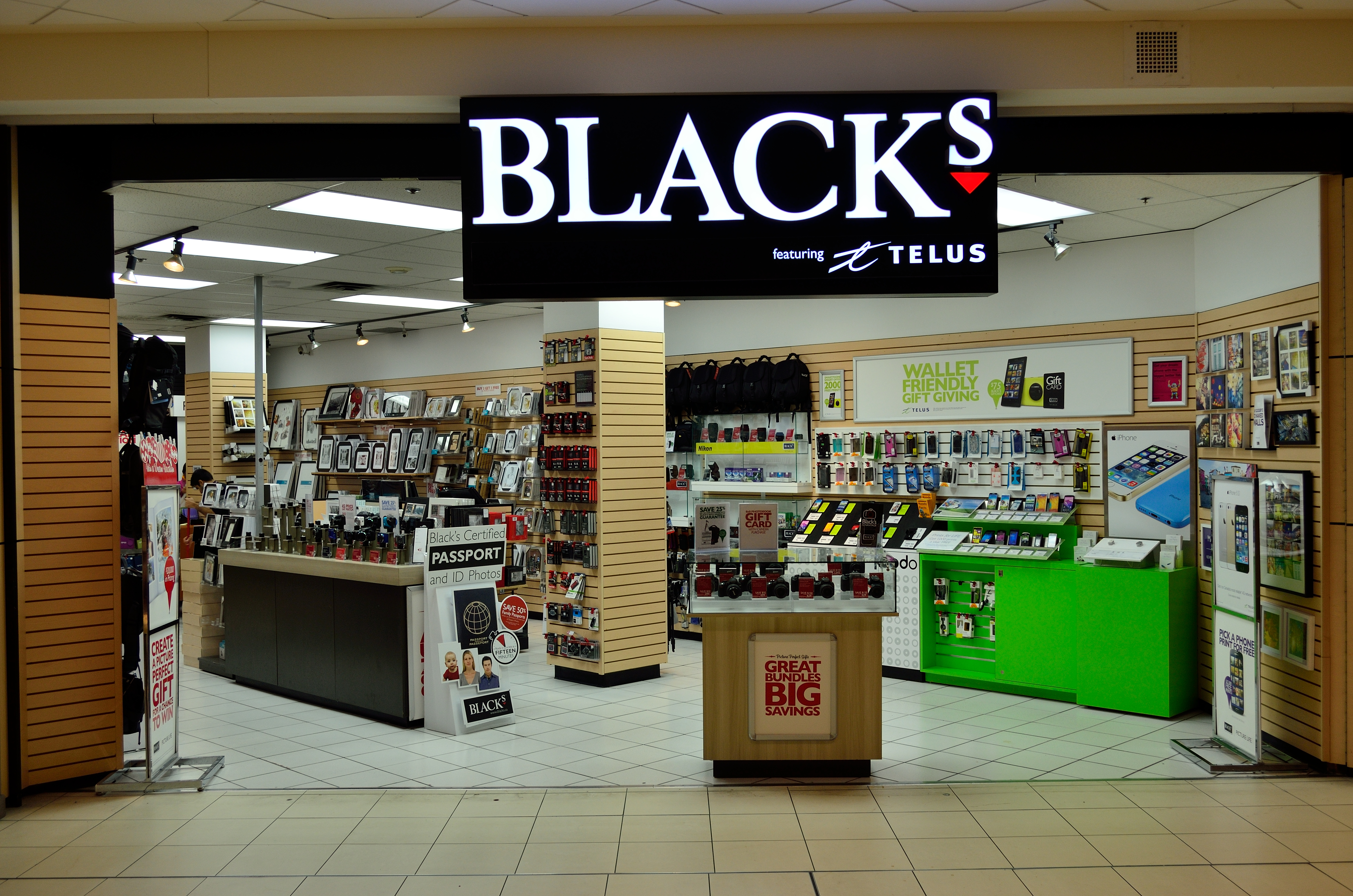
Older-format store at the Promenade Mall in Thornhill, Ontario.

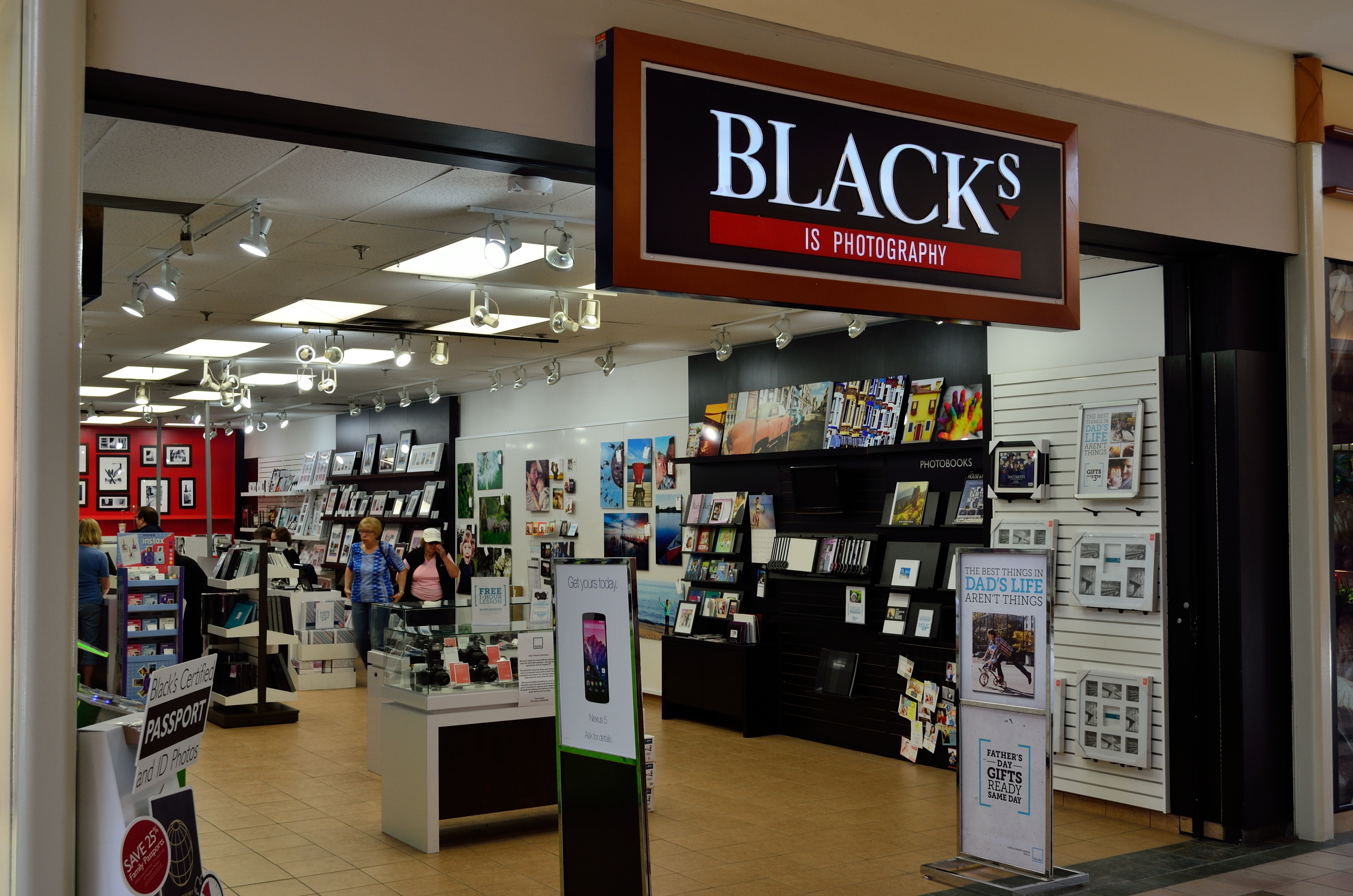
Blacks at Hillcrest Mall.

Blacks was founded in 1930 by Eddie Black, selling home appliances and electronics. However in 1939, with the first Royal visit to Canada being planned, Black anticipated that cameras and related items would be in high demand for the event, which turned out to be correct, so photography became the focus of Black's business.

In 1948, Eddie's sons William Edward Black (1925-2010) and Robert (Bob) Black opened Toronto's first specialty camera store on St. Clair Ave, known as "Eddie Black's Cameras".

The family owned firm became a public company in 1969 and was listed on Toronto Stock Exchange and later sold to Scott's Hospitality Inc in 1985. In 1993, Fujifilm bought the company and its 210 stores for $65 million.

Blacks expanded into Western Canada and acquired 45 Kit's Camera stores in British Columbia, Alberta, and Saskatchewan. In 1987, Blacks continued their expansion by acquiring the coincidentally-named Brown's Photo chain of the United States. The US stores were sold in 1991.

Blacks acquired Astral Photo in 1996, formed in 1968 by Astral Media in Montreal. The Quebec-based stores with locations in four provinces were ultimately renamed "Black's", but the last of the stores in Quebec were closed in 2013. Blacks currently does not have a presence in Quebec.

On October 29, 2007, Reichmann Hauer Capital Partners (RHCP) purchased the company. The company and its 113 stores was then acquired from RHCP by Telus on September 8, 2009 for $28 million.

In 2014, the company rebranded as "BLACK^{S}", in all caps, a superscripted s and without a possessive apostrophe, following the lead of fellow Canadian companies such as Eatons and Tim Hortons. It also launched a new store concept based largely around prints and other creative solutions for digital photography.

=== Retail closure ===
On June 9, 2015, Blacks announced it was closing all of its stores on August 8, 2015. The company stated that "Despite the positive momentum and financial improvements our BLACKS team has delivered over the last year, we have been unable to realize profitable growth and it would take considerable investment to adapt BLACKS to ongoing change." A total of 485 employees were affected.

== E-commerce ==
On June 14, 2015, Blacks announced that its online business (website and mobile app) had been acquired by Les Pros de la Photo, based in Montreal. As of August 4, 2015, the Blacks name and online photofinishing business operate under the new ownership.
