= Canal Vie =

Canadian French-language specialty TV channel

- Country: Canada
- Broadcast area: National
- Headquarters: Montreal, Quebec

Programming
- Language: French
- Picture format: 480i (SDTV); 1080i (HDTV)

Ownership
- Owner: Radiomutuel (1997-2000); Astral Media (2000-2013); Bell Media (2013-present)
- Sister channels: Noovo; CTV Life Channel; Canal D Z

History
- Launched: September 8, 1997

Links
- Website: Canal Vie (in French)

Canal Vie is a Canadian French language specialty channel owned by Bell Media. Canal Vie airs lifestyle and entertainment programs aimed at women in the form of talk shows, documentaries, reality TV series, and films. Programs focus on a variety of topics including home improvement, cooking, health, parenting, and relationships.

== History ==
In September 1996, Radiomutuel inc. was granted approval for a television broadcasting licence by the Canadian Radio-television and Telecommunications Commission (CRTC) for Le Canal Vie, described as "a national French-language specialty service that is dedicated to information and entertainment programs focused on three very specific subjects: lifestyle (human relations, social and interpersonal), health (physical and mental), and outdoor activities for families or individuals."

The channel launched on September 8, 1997 as Canal Vie.

In June 1999, Astral announced its intentions to purchase Radiomutuel, which was approved by the CRTC on January 12, 2000. The transaction closed shortly thereafter.

On March 4, 2013, the Competition Bureau approved the takeover of Astral Media by Bell Media. Bell filed a new application for the proposed takeover with the CRTC on March 6, 2013; the CRTC approved the merger on June 27, 2013, and closed on July 5, 2013. As a result, Bell divested various sister channels to Canal Vie to other companies.

Gusto replaced music channel M3 on September 1, 2016, and has since become a sister channel to Canal Vie.

== Canal Vie HD ==
On October 30, 2006, Astral Media launched Canal Vie HD, a HD simulcast of Canal Vie's standard definition feed. It is available on Shaw Direct, Optik TV, and Bell Satellite TV.

== International distribution ==
- Saint Pierre and Miquelon - distributed on SPM Telecom systems.

== Logos ==
Original logo of Canal Vie (1997–2005)

Second logo (2005–2008)

Logo used from 2008 to 2016
