= Family Channel (Canada) =

Canadian cable channel (1988–2025)

- Country: Canada
- Broadcast area: Nationwide (previously available in the Bahamas until September 2020, and in Jamaica up until its closure in October 2025)
- Headquarters: Toronto, Ontario, Canada

Programming
- Language: English
- Picture format: 1080i HDTV (downscaled to letterboxed 480i for the SDTV feed)
- Timeshift service: Family Channel East; Family Channel West

Ownership
- Owner: Allarcom Pay Television Limited (1988–1999); Corus Entertainment (1999–2001); Astral Media (1988–2013) (Note: Astral previously owned a 50% stake in the network; it would acquire Corus' shares in 2001.); Bell Media (2013–2014) (Note: Bell's ownership would be short-lived due to this company's acquisition of Astral the same year and the channel's divestment to WildBrain the following year.); WildBrain (2014–2025)
- Parent: WildBrain Television Inc.
- Sister channels: Family Jr. Télémagino; WildBrainTV

History
- Launched: September 1, 1988; 38 years ago
- Closed: October 23, 2025; 12 months ago
- Replaced by: Family (FAST) streamed by Roku in July 2026

Links
- Website: Family

Family Channel (commonly or simply known as Family) was a Canadian English-language specialty channel. Owned by WildBrain, it primarily broadcast children's television series, teen dramas, films, and general entertainment programming targeting a family audience. Its headquarters were located at Brookfield Place in the Financial District of Toronto.

The channel launched on September 1, 1988, as a premium television service, operating as a joint venture between Allarcom and First Choice Communications—the parent companies of fellow premium services Superchannel and First Choice. After subsequent acquisitions, by 1999 the network had become a joint venture of Corus Entertainment and Astral Media. In 2001, Corus traded its stake in Family to Astral for its stake in The Comedy Network, giving it full ownership. In 2013, Astral was in turn acquired by Bell Media, which would divest Family and its related properties to DHX Media (now WildBrain).

From its launch until 2015, Family maintained an output agreement with the American cable network Disney Channel, making it the Canadian broadcaster of its original series, made-for-TV movies, and specials. As part of this agreement, Astral would also launch Canadian versions of Disney Channel's sister networks Disney Junior and Disney XD. After the DHX acquisition, the licence agreement ended in 2015; Disney then entered into a new licensing agreement with Corus, which launched new Canadian versions of Disney Channel, Disney XD and Disney Junior. DHX rebranded its Disney-branded channels under the Family brand, and would establish new output agreements with companies such as AwesomenessTV, DreamWorks Animation and Mattel to supplant the Disney agreement, and increase its focus on programming targeting families and older teenage audiences.

Family was originally licensed as a premium specialty service, which necessitated that it operate under a commercial-free format, but allowed it to operate multiplex feeds (particularly the aforementioned Disney Junior, later Family Jr.). Nevertheless, television providers typically distributed Family as a conventional specialty channel. In 2016, Family was relieved of this mandate after the CRTC transitioned all premium specialty services to the standardized discretionary service licence.

In August 2025, WildBrain announced that it would close all of its specialty channels due to loss of carriage agreements; the network closed on October 23, 2025.

In July 2026, Family returned as a free ad-supported streaming television (FAST) channel that is available on Roku devices.

== History ==
=== Early history ===
Family Channel was licensed as a premium television service by the Canadian Radio-television and Telecommunications Commission (CRTC) on December 1, 1987; it was originally operated as a joint venture between Allarcom Pay Television Limited and First Choice Canadian Communications Corporation (owners of the premium services Superchannel and First Choice respectively), with both companies owning a 50% stake in the service. The channel's founding president was Susan Rubes, the founder of Young People's Theatre, who used the 1988 Toronto International Film Festival to promote it. 60% of its launch programming was sourced from Disney Channel. Other content included Canadian series (25% of the content) such as The Care Bears Adventures in Wonderland, The Wonderful Wizard of Oz and The Backstreet Six. The remaining 15% consisted of classic Hollywood movies and European imports. Broadcasts started on September 1, 1988. Four months after launch, the channel had 200,000 subscribers.

Original version of the current logo, used from October 1, 1999 to January 11, 2011.

In 1993, Astral Media acquired a controlling stake in First Choice. In October 1999, as part of the split of Western International Communications (which had acquired Allarcom), its stake in Family Channel was sold to Corus Entertainment. In March 2001, in response to concerns from the CRTC over Corus' near-monopoly position in children's specialty channels (accounting for its stakes in YTV, Treehouse, and Teletoon), Corus traded its stake in Family Channel to Astral Media in exchange for its stake in The Comedy Network for $126.9 million, giving them full ownership.

On January 11, 2011, Family launched a high-definition simulcast, and concurrently introduced an updated logo and on-air presentation.

=== Sale to DHX Media (2013–2014) ===
In March 2013, following the Competition Bureau's approval of Bell Media's acquisition of Astral Media, Bell announced that it would divest Family and its sister networks, among other assets, in order to reduce the market share it would hold in the English-language television market following the completion of the sale. The CRTC approved the sale on June 27, 2013, with Family Channel and its related networks concurrently placed in a blind trust held by businessman and former Montreal Canadiens president Pierre Boivin, pending their sale to a third-party. As of March 2013, Family Channel was available to approximately six million pay television households in Canada.

On November 28, 2013, DHX Media (now WildBrain) announced that it would acquire Family and its sister networks for $170 million. While the company already distributed and produced a large library of children's television series (particularly through its 2012 acquisition of the Cookie Jar Entertainment, which gave it ownership of the program libraries of Cinar and DIC Entertainment), the purchase marked DHX's first foray into broadcasting. DHX indicated that it would leverage its resources and library to add more original, Canadian-produced programming to Family under its ownership.

The acquisition of Family Channel and its sister networks by DHX was approved by the CRTC on July 24, 2014. As a condition of the sale, the CRTC imposed licensing conditions requiring that at least 60% of the Canadian programming broadcast by the network on an annual basis be produced by companies other than DHX. The acquisition was finalized on July 31, 2014, with Family and its sister networks becoming part of a newly formed division of the company known as DHX Television.

=== Removal of Disney Channel programming rights and programming changes (2015–2025) ===
On April 16, 2015, it was announced that Corus Entertainment had acquired Canadian rights to Disney Channel's programming library, and that it would launch a Canadian version of Disney Channel on September 1, 2015. DHX's programming agreement with Disney expired in January 2016. As a result of these changes, Disney programming was removed from Family Channel's lineup throughout the remainder of 2015, and its sister Disney Junior and Disney XD-branded networks were rebranded as Family Jr., Télémagino on September 18, and Family CHRGD (now WildBrainTV) on October 9. Corus would also launch new Disney Junior and Disney XD channels on December 1, 2015, and they closed on September 1, 2025.

On June 9, 2015, it was announced that a new incarnation of the Degrassi franchise, Degrassi: Next Class, would premiere on Family in 2016. The show is produced by Epitome Pictures, a studio where DHX acquired in 2014. Next Class premiered on January 4, 2016 as part of a new primetime block known as "F2N". The F2N block was positioned towards an older teenage audience than the "tween" audience that Family has typically targeted; DHX Television senior vice-president Joe Tedesco explained that the company had original series in development for Family in case its rights deal with Disney had expired, and that these decisions were based on a goal to build a "strong lineup" of programs, and was not financially motivated. Tedesco went on to explain that the F2N block was meant to create a "meaningful destination" for teens and (in the case of Degrassi, a series that has historically dealt with teen issues) encourage family viewing.

As part of the CRTC's "Let's Talk TV" initiative, DHX Media expressed concern that the elimination of genre protection for Category A specialty channels would put services licensed as premium services at an unfair disadvantage, especially due to their inability to air advertising. On November 2, 2016, the CRTC approved the implementation of new categories for licensed television services, replacing the separate specialty and pay television categories with a single Discretionary service category using standardized conditions of licence, and ruled that current premium services may operate under these deregulated policies effective immediately. This decision allowed Family Channel to begin operating under an advertising-supported format. Tedesco commended the CRTC for the decision, stating that it "represents the next logical step in the implementation of the Let's Talk TV decision, when genre protection was eliminated, and it ensures that pay and specialty channels will now be on a level field."

=== Closure ===
On December 18, 2024, WildBrain announced that it would sell a two-thirds majority stake of its television operations (including Family Channel) to IoM Media Ventures, a Halifax-based company founded by former WildBrain CEO Dana Landry.

In April 2025, WildBrain stated that it would be renegotiating aspects of the agreement, citing factors such as a decision by Bell Canada to not renew its carriage agreements for WildBrain's channels, pulling them from their lineup on May 20.

On August 25, 2025, WildBrain announced that it was unable to renew its carriage agreements with Rogers Cable, and announced plans to close all of its specialty channels (including Family) in the near future, stating that the decline of its carriage agreements meant the channels no longer had most of their value and were "no longer commercially viable". Television providers later reported that the closure would take effect at the end of the broadcast day of October 22, 2025. On October 31, 2025, the CRTC confirmed it had revoked Family's licence at the request of WildBrain.

== Programming ==
Family's programming was aimed towards youth audiences, encompassing original and acquired children's television series, teen dramas, sitcoms, and both theatrically released and made-for-TV movies. Its daytime lineup was aimed towards youth and teenagers, while its primetime programs are aimed at an older teenage and family audience. Some of its most notable original series were the sitcom Life with Derek (which ran from 2005 through 2009), Naturally, Sadie, and the mockumentary-style teen drama The Next Step (whose 2013 premiere was Family's highest-rated for an original series premiere to-date).

From launch through 2015, Family and its spin-offs had been the main Canadian outlets for programming from the American Disney Channel and its sibling brands; Disney Junior and Disney XD. Family would begin to remove Disney programming in late 2015, after Corus Entertainment acquired exclusive rights to Disney Channel and its associated brands in Canada. Since then, Family focused more on syndicated and off-network programming targeting teen and family audience, with DHX also entering into output agreements with AwesomenessTV, DreamWorks Animation and Mattel for programming across its networks. Family also co-commissioned programming with other international broadcasters, such as the children's horror anthology Creeped Out (with CBBC), and Bajillionaires (with Universal Kids; the channel had also picked up The Next Step and provided additional funding for its sixth season due to reduced financial commitments by DHX).

As previously mandated for premium services, Family did not initially air traditional commercial advertising. In November 2016, in a policy change lobbied for by DHX as part of a regulatory reform by the CRTC, existing premium channels were reclassified as a discretionary service with similar licensing conditions to most other specialty channels—thus relieving them of their mandate to operate commercial-free formats.

== Related services ==
=== Vrak.TV ===
Along with Family, Vrak launched on September 1, 1988 as Le Canal Famillie, which started as a French-language version of Family Channel and its competitor network, YTV. In 2001, the channel was renamed to Vrak.TV. On July 5, 2013, due to the acquisition of Astral by Bell Media, Vrak.TV was separated from Family. In 2014, it rebranded as Vrak, while launching a new program block called Vrak2. In 2016, the channel changed its demographic to the 13–35 age group due to the success of its Vrak2 block.

On August 16, 2023, Vrak and Z were removed from Vidéotron, the company that made the original channel it was based on over 40 years earlier, whilst Bell removed Yoopa from all of their TV services a day later. Yoopa shut down on January 11, 2024, and was replaced with a telecast version of its parent company's QUB Radio channel.

Two days later on August 18, 2023, Bell Media announced that the channel would be closing on October 1, 2023, owing to "challenges" in the broadcasting sector, lack of viewers and regulatory affairs deemed "outdated" by Bell Media. On September 25, the CRTC confirmed it had revoked Vrak's licence at the request of Bell Media, with the channel shut down on October 1, 2023.

=== Family Jr. and Télémagino ===
On November 30, 2007, Family launched Playhouse Disney Channel, a separate channel featuring programming aimed at a preschool audience, based on Disney's Playhouse Disney brand. Subject to carriage, the multiplex channel was made available at no additional charge to television providers and subscribers who receive its parent network. It was rebranded as Disney Junior on May 6, 2011, following the launch of the brand in the U.S earlier that year. On September 18, 2015, due to Corus Entertainment's acquisition of rights to Disney's children's programming and brands, the channel was rebranded as Family Jr.

As Family was licensed as a premium service, it is allowed to operate multiplex channels that carry additional programming consistent with its licensing and nature of service.

A French-language version of the channel, known as Télémagino, was launched on July 5, 2010 as Playhouse Disney Télé, operating under a separate licence.

=== WildBrainTV ===
On June 1, 2011, Family launched a Canadian version of Disney XD under a separate licence. It rebranded as "Family Chrgd" on October 9, 2015. It was renamed once more to WildBrainTV on March 1, 2022.

== See also ==
- List of Canadian television channels
