= Family Jr. =

Defunct television channel (2007-2025)

- Final logo used from 2015 to 2025
- Country: Canada
- Broadcast area: Nationwide
- Network: Family
- Headquarters: Toronto, Ontario

Programming
- Language: English
- Picture format: 1080i HDTV (downscaled to letterboxed 480i for the SDTV feed)

Ownership
- Owner: Astral Media (2007–2013); Bell Media (2013–2014) (Note: As with its sister channels, Bell's ownership was short-lived.); WildBrain (2014–2025)
- Sister channels: Family Channel; Télémagino; WildBrainTV

History
- Launched: November 30, 2007; 18 years ago
- Closed: October 23, 2025; 12 months ago
- Former names: Playhouse Disney Channel (2007–2011); Disney Junior (2011–2015)

Links
- Website: familyjr.ca (now redirects to wildbrain.com)

Family Jr. was a Canadian specialty channel owned by WildBrain. A sister channel to Family Channel, it broadcast children's programming aimed at viewers aged 2 to 7. Legally, the channel operated as a multiplex service of Family Channel, stemming from its former licensing status as a premium television service; it was distributed at no additional charge to Family Channel subscribers. Along with its French-language counterpart, Télémagino, it was available in over 4 million Canadian households as of 2013.

The channel launched on November 30, 2007, as a Canadian version of Playhouse Disney, under license from Disney Channels Worldwide (which had a library agreement with Family Channel at the time). It then rebranded under Disney's new preschool television brand Disney Junior on May 6, 2011. Following Bell Media's acquisition of Astral in 2013, the channel, along with its sister networks were divested to DHX Media in 2014. In 2015, Family Channel lost the rights to Disney Channel programming to Corus Entertainment: this resulted in the launch of a new Corus-run Disney Junior channel, and DHX's existing Disney Junior channel being rebranded as Family Jr.–a brand extension of Family Channel–on September 18, 2015. The channel later closed on October 23, 2025.

== History ==
=== As Playhouse Disney and Disney Junior ===
The channel originally launched as Playhouse Disney on November 30, 2007; as Family was originally licensed as a premium television service, it is allowed to operate multiplex channels consistent with the network's licence (which dictated that it provide a service with programming aimed at youth aged 17 and younger), thus the channel did not require separate CRTC approval, and would be offered at no additional charge to television providers who already carry Family Channel.

A French-language version, originally known as Playhouse Disney Télé, was launched on July 5, 2010. Unlike the English version, it operated under a separate license.

On May 6, 2011, the networks were rebranded under Disney's new preschool television brand, Disney Junior.

On March 4, 2013, Bell Media announced that it would divest the Family Channel networks as part of its then-proposed acquisition of Astral Media. On November 28, 2013, DHX Media (now WildBrain) announced it would acquire the Family Channel networks $170 million, pending CRTC approval. On July 24, 2014, the CRTC approved DHX's purchase of the networks, and the deal was closed on July 31, 2014.

=== As Family Jr. ===
On April 16, 2015, it was announced that Corus Entertainment had acquired rights to Disney's children's television library and brands, succeeding a previous license agreement with DHX. Corus stated that following the launch of a Canadian version of Disney Channel, it would re-launch Disney's other linear children's television brands in Canada in the future. In anticipation for this transition, DHX concurrently announced that its Disney-branded networks would be re-branded as brand extensions of Family Channel; Disney Junior was re-branded as Family Jr. on September 18, 2015. A Corus-owned incarnation of Disney Junior later ran from December 1, 2015 to September 1, 2025.

==== Closure ====
On December 18, 2024, WildBrain announced that it would sell a two-thirds majority stake of its television operations—including Family Channel—to IoM Media Ventures, a Halifax-based company founded by former WildBrain CEO Dana Landry.

In April 2025, WildBrain stated that it would be renegotiating aspects of the agreement, citing factors such as a decision by Bell Canada not to renew its carriage agreements for WildBrain's channels, pulling them from their lineup on May 20.

On August 25, 2025, WildBrain announced that it was unable to renew its carriage agreements with Rogers Cable. It therefore announced plans to close all of its specialty channels in the near future, as the loss of these carriage agreements meant the channels had lost most of their value and were "no longer commercially viable". All four networks shut down at 5:59 a.m. Eastern on October 23, though some providers stopped their carriage of the channels at midnight several hours earlier.

== Programming ==
=== Final programming ===
==== Canadian productions ====
- Beep & Mort (September 5, 2023 – October 22, 2025)
- Big Block SingSong (2023– October 22, 2025)
- Caillou (February 5, 2018 – October 22, 2025)
- Chip and Potato (October 15, 2018 – October 22, 2025)
- Daniel Tiger's Neighborhood (September 4, 2017 - October 22, 2025)
- The Fabulous Show with Fay and Fluffy (2022 – October 22, 2025)
- Happy House of Frightenstein (2021 – October 22, 2025)
- Jonny Jetboy (2024 – October 22, 2025)
- Justin Time (September 22, 2011– October 22, 2025)
- Kate & Mim-Mim (September 5, 2015 – October 22, 2025)
- Kiwi & Strit (2022 — October 22, 2025)
- Mighty Mike (April 1, 2019 – October 22, 2025)
- Polly Pocket (July 8, 2018 – October 22, 2025)
- Rev & Roll (September 2, 2019 – October 22, 2025)
- Space Ranger Roger (January 9, 2017 – October 22, 2025)
- Strawberry Shortcake: Berry in the Big City (October 17, 2021 – October 22, 2025)

==== Acquired programming ====
- ALVINNN!!! and the Chipmunks
- Arthur (May 10, 2024 - October 22, 2025)
- Ask the StoryBots
- Blippi Visits (2023 – October 22, 2025)
- Brave Bunnies (September 6, 2022 – October 22, 2025)
- Bubble Guppies (December 6, 2024 – October 22, 2025)
- Care Bears: Unlock the Magic (October 7, 2019 – October 22, 2025)
- Curious George (September 18, 2015 – October 22, 2025)
- Dog Loves Books (2020 – October 22, 2025)
- DreamWorks Dragons: Rescue Riders (August 7, 2021 – October 22, 2025)
- Fireman Sam (2024 - October 22, 2025)
- Grizzy & the Lemmings (March 24, 2018 – October 22, 2025)
- Go Jetters (March 1, 2021 – October 22, 2025)
- Hey Duggee (November 2, 2020 – October 22, 2025)
- Jungle Beat (2022 – October 22, 2025)
- Lucas the Spider (October 16, 2021 – October 22, 2025)
- Madagascar: A Little Wild (January 9, 2021 – October 22, 2025)
- Norman Picklestripes (September 19, 2020 – October 22, 2025)
- Petronix Defenders (January 7, 2023 – October 22, 2025)
- The Smurfs (2023 – October 22, 2025)
- Sunny Bunnies (July 2, 2018 – October 22, 2025)
- Super Wings (2022 – October 22, 2025)
- Teletubbies (December 19, 2015 – October 22, 2025)
- The Tiny Chef Show (February 1, 2023 – October 22, 2025)
- Twirlywoos (September 5, 2015 – October 22, 2025)
- Where's Waldo? (2023 – October 22, 2025)

=== Former programming ===
- Bananas in Pyjamas (February 19, 2013–February 2017)
- Bob the Builder
- Care Bears: Adventures in Care-a-lot (March 2010 – June 30, 2012)
- Dinotrux
- Elias: Rescue Team Adventures
- Franny's Feet (November 30, 2007 – February 4, 2018)
- Gerald McBoing-Boing (2009 – July 31, 2011)
- Harry and His Bucket Full of Dinosaurs (2009 – August 28, 2014)
- Henry's World (November 30, 2007 – September 27, 2013)
- In the Night Garden... (April 11, 2016 – July 1, 2024)
- Julius Jr. (May 2, 2015 – June 29, 2018)
- Katie and Orbie (November 30, 2007 – December 31, 2012)
- King (November 30, 2007 – February 2010)
- Kody Kapow
- Lalaloopsy (September 27, 2014 – August 28, 2016)
- Little People
- Mack & Moxy
- Messy Goes to Okido
- Nature Cat (July 1, 2016 – July 1, 2019)
- Noddy, Toyland Detective
- Pajanimals
- Playdate
- Rainbow Ruby
- Sarah & Duck (July 7, 2014 – September 1, 2019)
- The Save-Ums! (May 24, 2015 – September 1, 2018)
- The Secret World of Benjamin Bear (November 30, 2007 – August 30, 2015)
- Something Else (November 30, 2007 – 2008)
- Stella and Sam (January 9, 2011 – September 1, 2016)
- Strawberry Shortcake's Berry Bitty Adventures (2010–2020)
- Super Why! (November 7, 2016 – 2020)
- Thomas & Friends (May 24, 2015 – August 31, 2018)
- Tickety Toc (April 23, 2012 – July 30, 2018)
- Topsy and Tim
- Waybuloo (April 16, 2016 – 2019)
- Wow! Wow! Wubbzy! (July 20, 2009 – June 30, 2015)
- YaYa and Zouk (July 4, 2016 – September 1, 2019)
- Yo Gabba Gabba! (September 5, 2015 – September 1, 2019)
- Yup Yups (September 16, 2013 – 2018)

==== Disney programming ====
Titles in bold indicate programs that were moved to the new incarnation of Disney Junior.

- Bear in the Big Blue House (November 30, 2007 – September 30, 2013)
- Bunnytown (November 30, 2007 – 2012)
- **Doc McStuffins** (April 8, 2012 – August 30, 2015)
- DuckTales (October 2011–September 30, 2013)
- **Handy Manny** (November 30, 2007 – August 7, 2014)
- **Henry Hugglemonster** (April 21, 2013 – January 1, 2016)
- Higglytown Heroes (November 30, 2007 – September 30, 2013)
- **Imagination Movers** (2008–August 30, 2015)
- Johnny and the Sprites (November 30, 2007 – September 2, 2012)
- JoJo's Circus (November 30, 2007 – September 1, 2013)
- Jungle Junction (January 23, 2010 – August 30, 2015)
- **Jake and the Never Land Pirates** (May 2, 2011 – December 1, 2015)
- The Little Mermaid (November 30, 2007 – August 31, 2014)
- **Little Einsteins** (November 30, 2007 – January 1, 2016)
- **Mickey Mouse Clubhouse** (November 30, 2007 – September 17, 2015)
- **Miles from Tomorrowland** (February 21–August 30, 2015)
- My Friends Tigger & Pooh (November 30, 2007 – September 3, 2010)
- Out of the Box (November 30, 2007 – August 31, 2014)
- **Sheriff Callie's Wild West** (February 2, 2014 – December 1, 2015)
- **Special Agent Oso** (2009–January 1, 2016)
- **Sofia the First** (January 19, 2013 – August 31, 2015)
- Stanley (November 30, 2007 – September 27, 2013)

== Related services ==
=== Family Jr. HD ===
On May 1, 2013, a high definition simulcast of Family Jr.'s (as Disney Junior) standard definition feed was launched. It is available on Bell Aliant, Eastlink, Rogers Cable, SaskTel, Shaw Direct, and Telus Optik TV.

=== Family Jr. On Demand ===
Family Jr. On Demand was a video on demand service featuring programming from Family Jr, available to subscribers of Family. Family Jr. (as Disney Junior) launched its own On Demand channel on May 6, 2011.

=== Family Jr. Go ===
Family Jr. Go was a service available on the App Store and Google Play Store. It was initially only available to television customers of Shaw Cable and Shaw Direct, but expanded to other providers as years went by. It showed new and old episodes of Family Jr. programming as part of the Family app.

== Logos ==
2007–2011

2015–2025

== See also ==
- Treehouse TV — an offshoot of YTV, from which its name comes from the aforementioned channel's former programming block of the same name.
- Disney Jr. — the American TV channel and programming block on Disney Channel, from where Family Jr. previously sourced many of its programming from.
- List of Canadian television channels
