= Canal D =

Canadian television channel

- Canal D logo
- Country: Canada
- Broadcast area: Nationwide
- Headquarters: Montreal, Quebec

Programming
- Language: French
- Picture format: 1080i (HDTV); 480i (SDTV)

Ownership
- Owner: Astral Media (1995-2013); Bell Media (2013-Present)
- Sister channels: Noovo; Investigation; Canal Vie; Z

History
- Launched: January 1, 1995

Links
- Website: www.noovo.ca/canal-d (in French)

Canal D is a Quebecois (Canadian French) language discretionary service owned by Bell Media. Canal D focuses on documentary programming primarily in the form of documentary-style television series that focus on a variety of topics such as crime, biographies, nature, and science.

== History ==
In June 1994, Premier Choix: TVEC Inc. (Astral) was granted approval for a television broadcasting licence by the Canadian Radio-television and Telecommunications Commission (CRTC) for a channel called Arts et Divertissement, described as a service modelled after the American service, A&E, at that time. The proposed service was to focus on four main elements: documentaries (for which the service would primarily consist of), films, dramatic series, and arts programming.

The channel was launched on January 1, 1995, as Canal D.

On March 4, 2013, the Competition Bureau approved the takeover of Astral Media by Bell Media. Bell filed a new application for the proposed takeover with the CRTC on March 6, 2013; the CRTC approved the merger on June 27, 2013, effectively turning over control of Canal D to Bell on July 5 of that year.

== Canal D HD ==

On October 30, 2006, Astral Media launched "Canal D HD", an HD simulcast of Canal D's standard definition feed.

== International distribution ==
- Saint Pierre and Miquelon (France) - distributed on SPM Telecom systems.

Original logo; 1995-2009
