= Télémagino =

Defunct Canadian French-language TV channel (2010-2025)

- Country: Canada
- Broadcast area: National
- Headquarters: Montreal, Quebec

Programming
- Language: French
- Picture format: 1080i HDTV (downscaled to letterboxed 480i for the SDTV feed)

Ownership
- Owner: Astral Media (2010–2013); Bell Media (2013–2014) (Note: Much like with Family and its sister channels, Bell's ownership would be short-lived.); WildBrain (2014–2025)
- Sister channels: Family Jr. Family Channel; WildBrainTV

History
- Launched: 5 July 2010; 16 years ago
- Closed: 23 October 2025; 12 months ago
- Former names: Playhouse Disney Télé (2010–2011); Disney Junior (2011–2015)

Links
- Website: Télémagino

Télémagino was a Canadian French-language specialty channel owned by WildBrain. Launched on 5 July 2010, as a sister to an equivalent English-language service, it aired children's programming.

The channel previously operated under Disney–ABC Television Group's preschool television brands Playhouse Disney, then Disney Jr.. After Bell Media acquired Astral in 2013, the channel (along with its sister channel) were sold to DHX Media in 2014. The channel was rebranded on 18 September 2015, following the acquisition of Canadian rights to Disney's children's brands and programming by Corus Entertainment.

Along with its English-language sister channel Family Jr., it was available in over four million Canadian households as of 2013.

== History ==
=== As Playhouse Disney Télé and Disney Junior ===
The channel was licensed in 2006 as Vrak Junior, a sister channel to Astral's Vrak TV, though, aimed at younger viewers than Vrak. It was launched on 5 July 2010, as Playhouse Disney Télé. Three years prior, an English language version (then known as Playhouse Disney) was launched on 30 November 2007, as a multiplex channel of Family. The network took on the new Disney Junior brand in 2011.

On 4 March 2013, following the Competition Bureau's approval of Bell Media's takeover of Astral, it was announced that Family Channel and its sister networks (including the Disney Junior services, Disney XD, and MusiquePlus) would be divested in an attempt to relieve CRTC concerns regarding the takeover. On 28 November 2013, DHX Media announced it would acquire the four channels for $170 million pending CRTC approval. On 24 July 2014, the CRTC approved DHX's purchase of the networks, and the deal was closed on 31 July 2014.

=== As Télémagino ===
On 16 April 2015, it was announced that Corus Entertainment had acquired Canadian rights to Disney Channel's program library and would launch a Canadian version of Disney Channel that September, and that its sibling brands of Disney Junior and XD would be re-launched at a later date. In anticipation for this transition, DHX concurrently announced that its Disney-branded networks would be re-branded as spin-offs of Family Channel. The re-branding of Disney Junior's French feed was tentatively announced as , but was later changed to Télémagino. The new name was officially introduced on 18 September 2015, alongside the re-branding of its English-language counterpart as Family Jr.

==== Closure ====
On 18 December 2024, WildBrain announced that it would sell a two-thirds majority stake of its television operations—including Télémagino—to IoM Media Ventures, a Halifax-based company founded by former WildBrain CEO Dana Landry.

In April 2025, WildBrain stated that it would be renegotiating aspects of the agreement, citing factors such as a decision by Bell Canada not to renew its carriage agreements for WildBrain's channels, pulling them from their lineup on May 20.

On 25 August 2025, WildBrain announced that it was unable to renew its carriage agreements with Rogers Cable. It therefore announced plans to close all of its specialty channels in the near future, as the loss of these carriage agreements meant the channels had lost most of their value and were "no longer commercially viable". All four networks, including Télémagino, shut down at 5:59 a.m. Eastern on October 23, though some providers stopped their carriage of the channels at midnight several hours earlier.

== Programming ==
=== Final programming ===
- The Adventures of Puss in Boots (Les Aventures du Chat Potté) (12 June 2017 – 22 October 2025)
- All Hail King Julien (Roi Julian! L'élu des lemurs) (17 April 2017 – 22 October 2025)
- Bananas in Pyjamas
- Bob the Builder (Bob le bricoleur) (4 September 2017 – 22 October 2025)
- Caillou (5 February 2018 – 22 October 2025)
- Care Bears: Unlock the Magic (Les Câlinours : Libérez la Magie) (November 2019 – 22 October 2025)
- Daniel Tiger's Neighborhood (Le village de Dany) (6 November 2017 – 22 October 2025)
- Dinotrux (11 September 2017 – 22 October 2025)
- Dragons: Race to the Edge (Dragons: Par-delà les rives) (10 July 2017 – 22 October 2025)
- Franny's Feet (Franny et les chaussures magiques)
- Home: Adventures with Tip & Oh (En route: Les aventures de Tif et Oh) (30 July 2018 – 22 October 2025)
- In the Night Garden... (Dans le jardin des rêves...)
- Inspector Gadget (Inspecteur Gadget) (5 February 2018 – 22 October 2025)
- Johnny Test (26 February 2018 – 22 October 2025)
- Justin Time (Justin Rêve) (2011 – 22 October 2025)
- Kate & Mim-Mim (Kate et Mim-Mim) (9 January 2017 – 22 October 2025)
- Kody Kapow (19 May 2018 – 22 October 2025)
- Little People (4 September 2017 – 22 October 2025)
- Messy Goes to Okido (Messy et le monde d'Okido)
- The Mighty Jungle (La jungle magique) (6 January 2016 – 22 October 2025)
- The Mr. Peabody & Sherman Show (Le show de M. Peabody et Sherman) (3 November 2018 – 22 October 2025)
- Nature Cat (Félibert, le chaventurier) (1 July 2016 – 22 October 2025)
- Playdate (Viens jouer!)
- Pet Pals (Copains de compagnie) (September 2015 – 22 October 2025)
- Poko (9 January 2016 – 22 October 2025)
- Rainbow Ruby (9 April 2018 – 22 October 2025)
- The Save-Ums! (Les Sauve-tout) (2015– 22 October 2025)
- Space Ranger Roger (Roger, le heros sideral) (January 2017 – 22 October 2025)
- Strawberry Shortcake's Berry Bitty Adventures (Fraisinette : Aventures à Fraisi-Paradis) (Early 2012– 22 October 2025)
- Strawberry Shortcake: Berry in the Big City (Fraisinette : Berry dans la grande ville) (2022– 22 October 2025)
- Teletubbies
- Topsy and Tim (Topsy et Tim)
- Trollhunters: Tales of Arcadia (Chasseurs de Trolls: Les Contes d'Arcadia) (7 July 2018 – 22 October 2025)
- Turbo Fast (3 March 2018 – 22 October 2025)
- Twirlywoos
- Waybuloo
- Yo Gabba Gabba!
- Yup Yups
- Zoboomafoo

=== Former programming ===
- 101 Dalmatians: The Series (Les 101 dalmatiens)
- Aladdin
- Bear in the Big Blue House (Tibère et la Maison bleue) (5 July 2010 – 31 December 2015)
- Bo on the Go! (1 2 3 Bo !) (September 2015 - 25 June 2018)
- Doc McStuffins (Docteur la peluche) (8 April 2012 – 31 August 2015)
- The Doodlebops (Les Doodlebops) (5 July 2010 – 31 August 2016)
- DuckTales (La Bande à Picsou)
- Elliot Moose (Elliot) (6 May 2011 - 2013)
- Handy Manny (Manny et ses outils)
- Harry and His Bucket Full of Dinosaurs (Harry et ses dinosaures)
- Higglytown Heroes (Les Héros d'Higglyville) (5 July 2010 – September 2013)
- Jake and the Never Land Pirates (Jake et les Pirates du Pays Imaginaire) (6 May 2011 – 29 November 2015)
- Johnny and the Sprites (Johnny et Les Sprites)
- Jungle Junction (En route pour la jungle)
- Little Einsteins (Les Petits Einstein)
- Maggie and the Ferocious Beast (Marguerite et la bête féroce) (5 July 2010 – 31 December 2012)
- Mickey Mouse Clubhouse (La Maison de Mickey)
- Naughty Naughty Pets (Mes bestioles chéries) (Spring 2016 – 3 September 2017)
- PB&J Otter (5 July 2010 – June 2013)
- Sofia the First (Princesse Sofia) (2013 – 2015)
- Stanley (6 May 2011 - 2013)
- Stella and Sam (Stella et Sacha) (2010 – 30 September 2016)
- The Secret World of Benjamin Bear (L'ours Benjamin)
- Thomas & Friends (Thomas et ses amis) (2015 - 26 August 2018)
- Tickety Toc (2013 - 24 June 2018)

== Logos ==
2010-2011

2015-2025

== See also ==
- Family Channel
- Family Jr.
