= List of programs broadcast by Disney Channel (Canada) =

This is a list of television programs broadcast by Disney Channel, a Canadian version of the United States cable channel of the same name. Its former French-language feed, La Chaîne Disney, had a slightly different schedule than the English-language version.

== Current programming ==
As of November 2026:

=== Disney Channel (U.S.) original programming ===
==== Animated series ====
Title	Premiere date	Source(s)
Big City Greens	June 30, 2018	
Chibiverse	March 2023	
Kiff	March 10, 2023	
Phineas and Ferb	June 7, 2025	

==== Live-action series ====
Title	Premiere date	Source(s)
Vampirina: Teenage Vampire	September 13, 2025	

=== Disney XD (U.S.) original programming ===
==== Animated series ====
Title	Premiere date	Source(s)
Dragon Striker	June 12, 2026	

=== Acquired programming ===
An asterisk (*) means that the program is a Disney Jr. program.

==== Animated series ====
Title	Premiere date	Source(s)
Beyblade X	September 6, 2025	
Bluey*	2021 - August 31, 2025; November 10, 2025	

=== Reruns of ended series ===
==== Disney Channel (U.S.) original programming ====
Title	Date(s) rerun	Note(s)
Zombies: The Re-Animated Series	June 29, 2024	

==== Acquired programming ====
Title	Date(s) rerun	Note(s)
Agent Binky: Pets of the Universe	September 1, 2025	
Little Charmers	September 6, 2025	
The Berenstain Bears	September 1, 2016 – 2018; September 6, 2025	
The Stanley Dynamic	2024 - September 1, 2025; August 31, 2026	
The Hardy Boys	September 6, 2021 - 2024; September 1, 2025	
The Next Step	September 1, 2025	
Zoo Diaries	September 2, 2025	(Note: Also airs on National Geographic Wild and YTV)

=== Acquired from Disney Jr. (U.S.) ===
Title	Premiere date	Note(s)
Ariel	2024	
Firebuds	2022	
Hey A.J.!	January 13, 2026	
Iron Man and His Awesome Friends	September 1, 2025	
Magicampers	March 23, 2026	
Mickey Mouse Clubhouse+	September 1, 2025	
Pupstruction	2023	
RoboGobo	September 2, 2025	
Sofia the First: Royal Magic	May 25, 2026	
Spidey and His Amazing Friends	2022	
SuperKitties	2023	

== Former programming ==
=== Disney Channel (U.S.) original programming ===
==== Live-action series ====
Title	Ran from	Source(s)
A.N.T. Farm	December 6, 2015 – 2016	
Andi Mack	April 14, 2017 – 2019	
Austin & Ally	September 1, 2015 – 2017	
Best Friends Whenever	September 1, 2015 – 2018	
Bizaardvark	June 24, 2016 – 2019; September 2, 2022 - August 28, 2023	
Bunk'd	September 1, 2015 – September 1, 2025	
Bug Juice: My Adventures at Camp	2018	
Coop & Cami Ask the World	October 14, 2018 – 2021	
Disney Fam Jam	2020	
Dog with a Blog	September 1, 2015 – 2016	
Disney's Magic Bake-Off	August 13, 2021 – 2022	
Electric Bloom	July 11, 2025 – August 31, 2026	
Fast Layne	2019	
Gabby Duran & the Unsittables	October 11, 2019 – 2022	
Girl Meets World	September 1, 2015 – 2017; November 2023 - 2024	
Good Luck Charlie	December 18, 2015 – 2016; 2017 – September 1, 2019	
I Didn't Do It	October 16, 2015 – 2016	
Jessie	September 1, 2015 – August 29, 2022; September 2, 2024 – September 1, 2025	
Just Roll with It	June 15, 2019 – 2021	
K.C. Undercover	September 1, 2015 – 2018	
Liv and Maddie	September 1, 2015 – September 1, 2021	
The Lodge	September 23, 2016 - 2017	
Pretty Freekin Scary	June 15, 2023 - 2023	
Raven's Home	July 28, 2017 - 2024	
Saturdays	March 24, 2023 - 2023	
Secrets of Sulphur Springs	January 15, 2021 - 2023	
Shake It Up	September 1, 2015; December 18, 2015 – 2016	
Stuck in the Middle	February 14, 2016 – July 23, 2018	
Sydney to the Max	January 26, 2019 – August 28, 2023	
Ultra Violet & Black Scorpion	June 3, 2022 – August 26, 2023	
The Villains of Valley View	June 3, 2022 – August 24, 2024	
Wizards Beyond Waverly Place	October 29, 2024 – August 31, 2026	
Wizards of Waverly Place	September 1, 2016 – 2017	

==== Animated series ====
Title	Ran from	Source(s)
Amphibia	June 22, 2019 – August 26, 2023; January 27, 2025 – August 30, 2025	
Big Hero 6: The Series	June 30, 2018 - 2022	
Gravity Falls	September 5, 2015 - November 29, 2015; November 3–10, 2016; December 8–15, 2016; January 5, 2017; 2021; December 30, 2024 – August 29, 2025	
DuckTales (2017)	September 2, 2017; May 11, 2018 – June 1, 2025	
Elena of Avalor	July 22, 2016 – 2018	
Hailey's On It!	June 8, 2023 – August 22, 2024	
Hamster & Gretel	August 12, 2022 – September 1, 2025	
Mickey Mouse	September 1, 2015 – 2018	
Milo Murphy's Law	November 3, 2016 – December 1, 2016; September 1, 2021 - August 27, 2023	
Monsters at Work	April 6, 2024 – 2024	
Moon Girl and Devil Dinosaur	February 10, 2023 – August 31, 2025	
Primos	July 25, 2024 – August 31, 2025	
Rapunzel's Tangled Adventure	March 24, 2017 – March 1, 2020	
Star vs. the Forces of Evil	September 1, 2015 – 2020; September 1, 2022 - August 28, 2023	
Star Wars Resistance	October 7, 2018 – 2020	
StuGo	January 11, 2025 – September 1, 2025	
The Ghost and Molly McGee	October 1, 2021 – August 26, 2024	
The Owl House	January 12, 2020 – August 26, 2023	

=== Acquired programming ===
An asterisk (*) means that the program is a Disney Junior program.

==== Live-action series ====
Title	Ran from	Source(s)
Cache Craze	January 1, 2018 - 2019	
Cheer Squad	November 5, 2016 - August 31, 2020	
Degrassi: The Next Generation	May 30, 2022 - 2024	(Note: Also airs on ABC Spark and YTV)
Driving Me Crazy	January 23, 2021 - September 1, 2025	(Note: Also airs on YTV)
Extreme Babysitting	2015 - 2018	
Japanizi: Going, Going, Gong!	2015 - 2016	
Just for Laughs Gags	2016 - 2016	
Life with Boys	September 3, 2016 - September 1, 2018	
Made Up	2017 - September 1, 2025	
Make It Pop	May 5, 2025 - August 29, 2026	
Mr. Young	September 1, 2016 - 2018	
My Babysitter's a Vampire	September 5, 2015 - 2018	
Ride	September 4, 2017 - 2021	
Splatalot!	September 1, 2015 - 2016	
Tricked	2017 - 2021	
Undercover High	2017 - August 31, 2025	

==== Animated series ====
Title	Ran from	Source(s)
3 Amigonauts	2024 - August 31, 2025	(Note: Also airs on YTV, Cartoon Network, Disney XD and Boomerang)
6teen	September 2, 2017 – January 1, 2018	
PJ Masks*	2016 - 2024	
Chuck's Choice	2024 - 2025	
DuckTales	Disney Junior Run: December 1, 2015 – September 2, 2016; December 5 – 30, 2016; Disney Channel Run: April 25 – May 20, 2022	
Esme & Roy*	September 2, 2025 - August 30, 2026	
Gigantosaurus*	2019 – 2023	
Ghostforce	November 2021; September 1, 2022 - 2023	
Gracie's Corner*	July 13, 2026 - August 30, 2026	
Go Away, Unicorn!	January 1, 2019 – 2024	
Guess with Jess*	December 1, 2015 – September 2, 2016; December 5 – 30, 2016	
Hanazuki: Full of Treasures	January 28, 2017	
Harry and His Bucket Full of Dinosaurs*	January 6 – August 15, 2020	
Hotel Transylvania: The Series	2017 – August 31, 2026	
Jane and the Dragon*	December 1, 2015 – September 2, 2016	
Mike the Knight*	2020 – 2021	
My Big Big Friend*	September 1, 2018 – February 25, 2019	
My Friend Rabbit*	December 1, 2015 – August 30, 2018	
Pikwik Pack*	2022	
ReBoot: The Guardian Code	2022	
Rolie Polie Olie*	December 1, 2015 – August 30, 2018	
Timothy Goes to School*	September 3, 2016 – August 27, 2017	
The Cat in the Hat Knows a Lot About That!*	2020 – 2021	
Willa's Wild Life*	December 1, 2015 – August 30, 2018	
The ZhuZhus	September 4, 2017 - June 1, 2026	(Note: Also aired on Disney Jr. until the network's closure on September 1, 2025)

=== Acquired from Disney XD ===
Title	Ran from	Source(s)
Avengers Assemble	January 6, 2018 – 2019; 2023 – 2024	
Future-Worm!	December 22, 2016 – December 29, 2016	
Gamer's Guide to Pretty Much Everything	September 5, 2015 – November 29, 2015	
Guardians of the Galaxy	September 5, 2015 – November 29, 2015; December 22, 2016 – December 29, 2016; 2023 - 2024	
Kirby Buckets	December 22, 2016 – 2017	
Lab Rats	September 5, 2015 – November 29, 2015	
Lab Rats: Elite Force	March 6, 2016 – 2017	
MECH-X4	November 17, 2016 – December 15, 2016	
Penn Zero: Part-Time Hero	September 5, 2015 – November 29, 2015	
Pickle and Peanut	September 5, 2015 – November 29, 2015; December 22, 2016 – December 29, 2016	
Marvel's Spider-Man	2017 – 2018; 2023 – 2024	
Star Wars Rebels	September 5, 2015 – November 29, 2015; December 22, 2016 – May 25, 2017	
Walk the Prank	November 3, 2016 – November 25, 2016	

=== Acquired from Disney Junior ===
Title	Ran from	Source(s)
Alice's Wonderland Bakery	2022 - 2024	
Doc McStuffins	September 1, 2015 – ???; April 25 - May 20th, 2022	
Eureka!	September 5, 2022 – July 24, 2023	
Fancy Nancy	July 13, 2018 - 2021	
Henry Hugglemonster	September 1, 2015 – December 18, 2015	
Jake and the Never Land Pirates	September 1, 2015 – December 18, 2015; April 25 - May 20, 2022	
Mickey Mouse Clubhouse	September 1, 2015 – December 18, 2015; April 25 - May 20, 2022	
Mickey and the Roadster Racers/Mickey Mouse Mixed-Up Adventures	January 15, 2017 - 2021	
Miles from Tomorrowland	September 1, 2015 – December 18, 2015	
Mira, Royal Detective	March 20, 2020 - 2022	
Mickey Mouse Funhouse	2021— August 29, 2025	
Muppet Babies	March 23, 2018 - 2022	
Puppy Dog Pals	April 14, 2017 — August 29, 2025	
Sheriff Callie's Wild West	September 1, 2015 – December 18, 2015	
Sofia the First	September 1, 2015 – December 18, 2015	
Star Wars: Young Jedi Adventures	2023 — August 28, 2026	
T.O.T.S.	June 14, 2019 - 2022	
Vampirina	October 1, 2017 - 2022	
