= Discovery Kids =

Children's educational brand

- Discovery Kids Latin America's current logo since April 7, 2021
- Product type: Television networks: Programming blocks
- Introduced: Discovery Kids Channel; October 22, 1996 (United States); November 4, 1996 (Latin America)

Discovery Kids is a children's educational brand owned by Skydance Corporation. Starting as a television block within Discovery Channel, the brand expanded as a separate television channel in October 1996. In 2002, the channel began airing a Saturday morning children's programming block on NBC, which ran from October 5, 2002, to September 2, 2006.

Most of Discovery Kids' worldwide channels, as well as its website for children's activities and consumer products, have been either rebranded or shut down. Following the Warner Bros. Discovery merger in 2022, the brand was replaced by the standard Discovery brand for activities and consumer products. As of 2026, Discovery Kids-branded channels continue to broadcast in both India and Latin America. An unbranded morning programming block based on the Latin American channel (formerly branded as Discovery Kids) also airs in the United States on Discovery Familia.

== Channels ==
=== Current channels ===
- Discovery Kids Latin America (launched in 1996; divided into five feeds plus one subfeed)
  - Pan-regional feed (broadcast to most Latin American countries, including the Caribbean)
  - Mexican feed
  - Colombian feed
  - Southern feed (broadcast to Argentina, Paraguay and Uruguay)
    - Chilean subfeed (available in Chile with local advertisement)
  - Brazilian feed (dubbed in Portuguese)
- Discovery Kids India (launched in 2012)

=== Former channels ===
- Discovery Kids on NBC, programming block on NBC (2002-2006)
- Discovery Kids Australia (2014-2020)
- DKids, broadcast in Middle East and North Africa (2016-2020)
- Discovery Kids UK, time-shared with Discovery Wings (both operated from 2000 to 2007)
- Discovery Kids Asia (2012-2018)

==== Rebranded channels ====
- Discovery Kids US (1996–2010) – In 2009, the channel became a 50/50 joint venture between Discovery and Hasbro Entertainment and was relaunched as Hub Network in 2010. The channel was relaunched again as Discovery Family in 2014, after Discovery reacquired 10% of Hasbro's stake in the network.
  - Discovery Kids en Español (2005–2007) – A former Spanish-language counterpart to Discovery Kids US. In 2007, the channel merged with Discovery Viajar y Vivir to become Discovery Familia, effectively converting Discovery Kids en Español into a daytime programming block. The block became unbranded in 2014 and currently airs in the morning hours.
- Discovery Kids Canada (2001–2009) – In 2009, Corus announced that the channel would be relaunched as a Canadian version of Nickelodeon under license from MTV Networks. The channel, along with ABC Spark, Disney Jr., Disney XD, and La Chaîne Disney, would all later shut down in 2025 due to financial pressure within Corus.

== See also ==
- Discovery Channel – American cable television channel
