= 2013 in Canadian television =

The following is a list of events affecting Canadian television in 2013. Events listed include television show debuts, finales, cancellations, and channel launches, closures and rebrandings.

== Events ==
=== January ===
Date	Event
15	Rogers Communications acquires Shaw Communications' Mountain Cablevision system in Hamilton, Ontario as part of an agreement with Shaw for an option to purchase Shaw's AWS spectrum holdings.
15	Concurrent with Rogers' acquisition of Mountain Cablevision, Shaw Communications acquires Rogers' 33.3% ownership stake in specialty channel TVtropolis for $59 million.
17	Rogers Media files an application with the Canadian Radio-television and Telecommunications Commission to change programming conditions on The Score's specialty channel licence to reduce sports highlight segments during live sports programming from airing every 15 minutes to airing once hourly.
21	Omni Television owned-and-operated station CJMT-DT/Toronto switches to an all-ethnic programming format with the addition of 35 hours of programming in Asian and South Asian languages (including Mandarin, Cantonese, Punjabi, Tamil, Hindi, Japanese, Korean, Urdu, Vietnamese and Persian) weekly.

=== February ===
Date	Event
1	Zee TV Canada, a Category B Hindi specialty channel owned by Ethnic Channels Group, launches.
4	City expands into Eastern Canada full-time as multicultural station CJNT/Montreal begins running City's full national schedule, effectively turning CJNT into an owned-and-operated station of the Rogers Media-owned system (City's programming had been seen part-time since June 2012, alongside multicultural programs from Omni); the station also changed its on-air branding from "Metro 14" to "City Montreal". With the conversion, CJNT is now the first over-the-air television station in Canada to have its licensed format changed.
27	The Movie Network launches subscription video-on-demand services for desktop computers and mobile devices: The Movie Network GO, HBO GO Canada (for streaming of HBO Canada content) and TMN Encore GO (for streaming of The Movie Network Encore content). All three services will be made available to subscribers of TMN, TMN Encore and HBO Canada at no additional cost.
28	CBC News Network drops Tom Flanagan from his role as a commentator on Power & Politics following comments he made during a February 27 University of Lethbridge discussion about child pornography in which Flanagan said that there was "no harm" in viewing such material.

=== March ===
Date	Event
3	The 1st Canadian Screen Awards airs on CBC, The first annual award ceremony following the Academy of Canadian Cinema & Television's decision to merge with two award ceremonies, The Genie Awards (film) and the Gemini Awards (television).
4	After an earlier attempt to merge the two companies was rejected by the CRTC in October 2012, the Competition Bureau approves Bell Media's $3.38 billion takeover of Astral Media (Bell filed a formal application with the CRTC to acquire Astral on March 6). Bell will sell Family, Disney Junior (both English and French), Disney XD, Musimax and MusiquePlus as part of the deal. The ruling places restrictions preventing Bell Media from imposing restrictive bundling requirements on any provider seeking to carry The Movie Network or Super Écran (which are among the eight channels that will be acquired by Bell through the merger).
4	In relation to the Bell-Astral deal, Corus Entertainment acquires Astral Media's 50% ownership stake in Cartoon Network, Historia, Séries+, Teletoon and Teletoon Retro (along with French-language versions of the latter two networks) as part of a $400.6 million deal that also includes two Astral-owned radio stations in Ottawa. It also acquires Shaw Media's 49% interest in ABC Spark (the latter agreement will result in Corus selling its 20% interest in Food Network to Shaw). Corus acquisition of Teletoon, Historia and Series+ was approved by the Competition Bureau on March 15. The CRTC approved the sale on December 20.
5	Bell Satellite TV becomes the first Canadian satellite provider to offer community channels, with the addition of seven channels to its line-up serving Chetwynd and Valemount, British Columbia; Neepawa, Manitoba; Hay River, Northwest Territories; Arichat, Nova Scotia; Leamington, Ontario and St. Andrews, New Brunswick.
14	Global News: BC 1, a Shaw Media-owned regional cable news channel focusing on Vancouver and the province of British Columbia, launches. The channel is the first regional cable news channel in Canada located outside of Ontario.
15	The Canadian Radio-Television & Telecommunications Commission rules that Corus Entertainment must comply with the licensing conditions for the Oprah Winfrey Network that require the channel to maintain formal education and preschool programming during daytime hours (encompassing 55% of its weekly schedule).

=== April ===
Date	Event
14	Valérie Carpentier wins the first season of La Voix.

=== May ===
Date	Event
2	The first season of the Canadian version of Big Brother is won by Jillian MacLaughlin.
30	Rogers Media announces budget cuts that would result in the layoffs of 62 employees, the elimination of Omni Television's English-language South Asian newscast and shut down of Omni's production operations in Alberta (Omni stations CJCO-DT in Calgary and CJEO-DT in Edmonton will continue to broadcast, although local programming will no longer be produced by the two stations). Rogers also announces the shutdown of regional cable news channel CityNews Channel due to financial losses for the service, Rogers will focus its news efforts in the Toronto area on all-news radio station CFTR and City flagship CITY-DT's news department.

=== June ===
Date	Event
27	The CRTC approves Bell Media's $3 billion merger with Astral Media: the deal was finalized on July 5, 2013, Bell's share of the English-language media increased to 35.8%, while its ownership share of French-language media increased to 22.6% of the media marketplace.
28	After 10 years on TSN's flagship show, SportsCentre, Jay Onrait and Dan O'Toole anchor their last show together; the two leave TSN to become anchors of Fox Sports Live on the upcoming U.S. sports network Fox Sports 1.

=== July ===
Date	Event
1	Rogers Media-owned sports news and information channel The Score rebrands as Sportsnet 360.
15	It was announced that Blue Ant Media had reached a deal with the Smithsonian Institution and CBS Corporation to re-launch eqhd as a Canadian version of Smithsonian Channel.

=== August ===
Date	Event
26	Shaw Media-owned channel TVtropolis rebrands as DTour.

=== September ===
Date	Event
4	Blue Ant Media-owned Bold relaunched as Cottage Life, a Category B specialty channel based on the company-owned magazine of the same name. The channel features lifestyle programming, including food, home improvement and outdoor series.
6	The Shopping Channel relaunched with a new look.
30	Bell Media-owned MuchMore re-launched as M3.

=== October ===
Date	Event
9	For the first time in 22 years, the Sabres Hockey Network will be made available to areas of Canada within 50 miles of the First Niagara Center, including all of the Regional Municipality of Niagara. 51 Buffalo Sabres games will be carried by Bell Satellite TV each year on their own channel as part of the agreement.

=== November ===
Date	Event
13	Blue Ant Media-owned eqhd re-launched as the Smithsonian Channel.
26	The National Hockey League reaches a 12-year, $5.2 billion deal with Rogers Communications for exclusive English-language multimedia rights to NHL games beginning in 2014–15. The deal will see Rogers air exclusive Wednesday, Saturday, and Sunday night games on Sportsnet or City, as well as sublicence Saturday night and playoff games to CBC's Hockey Night in Canada. TVA Sports also acquires French language rights in a related deal, which all told will see TSN and RDS lose national NHL rights after 2013–14.
28	DHX Media announced that it would acquire four Canadian specialty television channels from the former Astral Media for $170 million, consisting of Family Channel, Disney Junior, Disney Junior (French), and Disney XD. The networks were being sold as a condition of Bell Media's 2013 acquisition of Astral.
30	Darren Dutchyshen and Kate Beirness become the weeknight anchors on SportsCentre following the departure of Jay Onrait and Dan O'Toole. It would last for only 11 months as Dutch would return to the late night show with his longtime sidekick, Jennifer Hedger.

=== December ===
Date	Event
4	Remstar, owners of the French television system V, announced that it would acquire MusiquePlus and MusiMax from the former Astral Media for an undisclosed amount. The networks were being sold as a condition of Bell Media's 2013 acquisition of Astral.
12	Bell Media launched sister channel to Canal D called Canal D/Investigation focusing on crime dramas.

== Television programs ==
=== Programs debuting in 2013 ===
Series currently listed here have been announced by their respective networks as scheduled to premiere in 2013. Note that shows may be delayed or cancelled by the network between now and their scheduled air dates.

Start Date	Show	Channel	Source
January 8	Cracked	CBC Television	
January 10	Rocket Monkeys	Teletoon	
January 20	La Voix	TVA	
February 3	Motive	CTV	
February 4	Seed	City	
March 8	The Next Step	Family Channel	
March 30	Orphan Black	Space	
June 13	Package Deal	City	
June 24	Satisfaction	CTV	
July 4	Camp Lakebottom	Teletoon	
July 15	The Amazing Race Canada	CTV	
August 26	Breakfast Television (Montreal edition)	City	
August 27	Paw Patrol	TVOKids	
September 2	The Social	CTV	
September 4	Forgive Me	Super Channel	
September 5	Grojband	Teletoon	
October 3	Played	CTV	
October 22	The Illegal Eater	Travel + Escape	
November 17	Sex & Violence	OutTV	
December 30	The Adventures of Napkin Man	CBC	

=== Made-for-TV movies and miniseries ===
Premiere date	Title	Channel	Notes	Source
January 11	Borealis	Space		
March 10	Jack	CBC Television	Biopic of Jack Layton	
July 6	Everyone's Famous	CBC Television	Web series rebroadcast as a comedy special.	
July 6	Gavin Crawford's Wild West	CBC Television	Unsold pilot aired as a comedy special.	

=== Programs ending in 2013 ===
Show	Station	End date
Crash Canyon	Teletoon at Night	March 3

=== Changes of network affiliation ===
Show	Moved from	Moved to
Being Ian	Nickelodeon	BBC Kids

== Television stations ==
=== Station launches ===
Date	Market	Station	Channel	Affiliation	Source
December 11	Montreal, Quebec	CFHD-DT	47.1	Independent/Omni	

=== Network affiliation changes ===
Date	Market	Station	Channel	Old affiliation	New affiliation	Notes/References
Unknown	Vancouver, British Columbia	CHNU-DT	66.1 (PSIP)	Joy TV	Independent (primary); Yes TV (secondrary)	

== Deaths ==
Date	Name	Age	Notability	Source
Jan. 14	Conrad Bain	89	Canadian-born American actor, known for his roles as Dr. Arthur Harmon in Maude (1972-1978), Phillip Drummond in Diff'rent Strokes (1978-1986) and Charlie Ross in the short-lived Mr. President (1987-1988); guest starring roles include Westinghouse Studio One, The Defenders, N.Y.P.D., Dark Shadows, The Facts of Life, The Love Boat, The Fresh Prince of Bel-Air and Unforgettable.	
July 13	Cory Monteith	31	Canadian actor, known for his role as Finn Hudson in Glee.	
Nov. 28	Danny Wells	72	Canadian television and film actor (The Jeffersons, The Super Mario Bros. Super Show!)	
Dec. 21	Geoff Stirling	92	Canadian multimedia mogul (founder of CJON-DT)	

== See also ==
- 2013 in Canada
- List of Canadian films of 2013
