= Disney XD (international) =

Disney XD logo

Disney XD is a children's television channel brand owned by the Disney Kids & Family and Disney Entertainment divisions of the Walt Disney Company, that launched in the United States on February 13, 2009, as the merge result of two blocks Toon Disney and Jetix, both of which previously had individual international presence.

Since 2019, Disney XD has been discontinued or closed down globally (except in Poland and locally in the United States) to prioritize Disney Channel moving its content to its respective channels and also by the launches of Disney+ in those regions (excluding Canada, where its closure occurred due to financial pressure at Corus Entertainment).

== Current channels ==
| Market | Type | Formerly | Launch date | Operator |
|---|---|---|---|---|
| United States | channel | Toon Disney | February 13, 2009 | Disney Kids & Family |
| Poland | channel | Jetix | September 19, 2009 | The Walt Disney Company Limited (80%); AMC Global Media (20%) |

== Former channels ==
| Market | Type | Formerly | Active date | feeds/other countries | Operator | Fate |
|---|---|---|---|---|---|---|
| Canada (original) | channel | Family Extreme (license proposal name) | June 1, 2011 – October 9, 2015 | None | DHX Media | Rebranded as Family CHRGD following loss of Disney intellectual property rights to Corus Entertainment. Later called WildBrainTV until its closure in 2025. |
| Canada (French) | programming block on La Chaîne Disney | —N/a | June 27, 2016 – Summer 2019 | None | Corus Entertainment | Disney XD Zone was firstly a programming block on Disney Channel France between 2015 and 2016. The block was launched on the Canadian French-language channel La Chaîne Disney on 27 June 2016, called XD Zone. Disney Channel Canada also aired a Disney XD programming block over several periods. Disney XD shows later became part of regular La Chaîne Disney programming. |
| Israel | pop-up channel | —N/a | January 1, 2018 – February 1, 2018 | None | The Walt Disney Company Israel | Opened as a one-month temporary channel exclusively on Hot. |
| Netherlands | HD 24h/24 channel | —N/a | June 1, 2010 – August 1, 2018 | Belgium | Disney Channels (Benelux) B.V. | The 24h channel was available on Belgium ISP and cable operators, while the free-to-air channel was not (only on satellite with TV Vlaanderen). |
| Australia | channel | —N/a | April 10, 2014 – January 6, 2019 | New Zealand | The Walt Disney Company Australia | Selected programming moved to Disney Channel following the channel's closure. |
| India | channel | Jetix | November 14, 2009 – January 20, 2019 | Sri Lanka, Maldives, Bangladesh (until February 2013), Nepal and Bhutan | The Walt Disney Company India | Replaced by Marvel HQ, which went on the air on January 20, 2019, and continued to air select Disney XD shows; it would be rebranded once again as Super Hungama in 2022. Replaced by Disney XD Asia in Bangladesh after ban in 2016. |
| Italy | channel | Jetix | September 28, 2009 – October 1, 2019 | Switzerland | The Walt Disney Company Italy | The Walt Disney Company Italy's deal with Sky Italia was not renewed, which caused the closure of the channel alongside other Disney and Fox networks. |
| Italy | channel +1 | Jetix +1 | September 28, 2009 – October 1, 2019 | Switzerland | The Walt Disney Company Italy | The Walt Disney Company Italy's deal with Sky Italia was not renewed, which caused the closure of the channel alongside other Disney and Fox networks. |
| Italy | channel +2 | Toon Disney +1 | October 1, 2011 – April 9, 2018 | Switzerland | The Walt Disney Company Italy | The Walt Disney Company Italy's deal with Sky Italia was not renewed, which caused the closure of the channel alongside other Disney and Fox networks. |
| Italy | channel HD | —N/a | May 9, 2012 – October 1, 2019 | Switzerland | The Walt Disney Company Italy | The Walt Disney Company Italy's deal with Sky Italia was not renewed, which caused the closure of the channel alongside other Disney and Fox networks. |
| Spain | channel | Jetix | September 18, 2009 – April 1, 2020 | Andorra | The Walt Disney Company Spain | Selected programming moved to Disney Channel and Disney+ following the channel's closure. |
| Spain | channel +1 | Jetix +1 | September 18, 2009 – March 9, 2017 | Andorra | The Walt Disney Company Spain | Selected programming moved to Disney Channel and Disney+ following the channel's closure. |
| Spain | channel HD | —N/a | June 1, 2013 – April 1, 2020 | Andorra | The Walt Disney Company Spain | Selected programming moved to Disney Channel and Disney+ following the channel's closure. |
| Germany | channel | Jetix | October 18, 2009 – April 1, 2020 | Austria, Switzerland | The Walt Disney Company Germany | Selected programming moved to Disney Channel and Disney+ following the channel's closure. |
| Germany | channel +1 | Jetix +1 | April 15, 2010 – April 1, 2020 | Austria, Switzerland | The Walt Disney Company Germany | Selected programming moved to Disney Channel and Disney+ following the channel's closure. |
| Germany | channel HD | —N/a | September 5, 2013 – April 1, 2020 | Austria, Switzerland | The Walt Disney Company Germany | Selected programming moved to Disney Channel and Disney+ following the channel's closure. |
| France | channel | Jetix | April 1, 2009 – April 7, 2020 | Belgium, Switzerland, Luxembourg, Sub-Saharan Africa and other French-speaking regions | The Walt Disney Company France | Selected programming moved to Disney Channel and Disney+ following the channel's closure. The channel closed on April 1, 2020 in Belgium, Switzerland and Luxembourg, but was postponed along with the Disney+ launch in mainland France to April 7, 2020. It ultimately closed on May 1, 2020 in other regions outside Europe including Overseas France and Sub-Saharan Africa. |
| France | channel HD | —N/a | September 20, 2011 – April 7, 2020 | Belgium, Switzerland, Luxembourg, Sub-Saharan Africa and other French-speaking regions | The Walt Disney Company France | Selected programming moved to Disney Channel and Disney+ following the channel's closure. The channel closed on April 1, 2020 in Belgium, Switzerland and Luxembourg, but was postponed along with the Disney+ launch in mainland France to April 7, 2020. It ultimately closed on May 1, 2020 in other regions outside Europe including Overseas France and Sub-Saharan Africa. |
| United Kingdom | +1 channel | Jetix +1 | September 1, 2009 – May 1, 2020 | Ireland | Disney Co. Ltd. (UK/Europe) | Closed alongside select Disney channels in Europe and Australia due to its content moving to Disney+, and its Sky EPG slot was given to BabyTV (now on Channel 626). |
| United Kingdom | channel | Jetix | September 1, 2009 – October 1, 2020 | Ireland | Disney Co. Ltd. (UK/Europe) | Sky and Virgin Media declined to sign a new deal to keep the Disney-branded networks running after the successful launch of Disney+ in the country. Selected programming moved to the service following the channel's closure, and Sky Kids took its Virgin Media slot. |
| United Kingdom | channel HD | —N/a | October 18, 2010 – October 1, 2020 | Ireland | Disney Co. Ltd. (UK/Europe) | Sky and Virgin Media declined to sign a new deal to keep the Disney-branded networks running after the successful launch of Disney+ in the country. Selected programming moved to the service following the channel's closure, and Sky Kids took its Virgin Media slot. |
| Scandinavia | channel | Toon Disney/Jetix | September 12, 2009 – December 31, 2020 | Sweden, Norway, Finland, Denmark, Iceland | The Walt Disney Company Limited | Selected programming moved to Disney Channel and Disney+ following the channel's closure. |
| Southeast Asia | channel | —N/a | September 15, 2012 – January 1, 2021 | Malaysia and Brunei | The Walt Disney Company (Southeast Asia) | Selected programming moved to Disney+ Hotstar following the channel's closure on June 1, 2021. |
| Southeast Asia | channel | —N/a | October 19, 2013 – January 1, 2021 | Indonesia | The Walt Disney Company (Southeast Asia) | Selected programming moved to Disney Channel and Disney+ Hotstar following the channel's closure. |
| Southeast Asia | channel | —N/a | March 16, 2013 – June 1, 2020 | Singapore | The Walt Disney Company (Southeast Asia) | Contract renewal failure with service providers in the country. Selected programming available on Disney+. |
| Southeast Asia | channel | —N/a | October 19, 2013 – January 1, 2021 | Thailand | The Walt Disney Company (Southeast Asia) | Selected programming moved to Disney Channel and Disney+ Hotstar following the channel's closure on June 30, 2021. |
| Southeast Asia | channel | —N/a | June 1, 2014 – January 1, 2021 | Philippines | The Walt Disney Company (Southeast Asia) | Replaced by Metro Channel on the Cignal cable provider. Selected programming moved to Disney Channel and Disney+ following the channel's closure on November 17, 2022. |
| Japan | channel | Toon Disney | August 1, 2009 – January 31, 2021 | None | The Walt Disney Company (Japan) Ltd. | Selected programming moved to Disney Channel and Disney+ following the channel's closure. |
| Japan | channel HD | —N/a | September 29, 2012 – January 31, 2021 | None | The Walt Disney Company (Japan) Ltd. | Selected programming moved to Disney Channel and Disney+ following the channel's closure. |
| Greece | channel | Jetix | October 3, 2009 – January 31, 2021 | Cyprus | The Walt Disney Company Limited | Selected programming moved to Disney Channel and Disney+ following the channel's closure. |
| EMEA | channel | Jetix | October 3, 2009 – January 31, 2021 | Turkey, Serbia, Croatia, Bosnia, Slovenia, North Macedonia, Montenegro, Kosovo, Albania, Lithuania, Latvia, Estonia | The Walt Disney Company Limited | Selected programming moved to Disney Channel and Disney+ following the channel's closure. |
| EMEA | channel | Jetix | October 3, 2009 – January 1, 2021 | Middle East and North Africa | The Walt Disney Company Limited | Selected programming moved to Disney Channel and Disney+ following the channel's closure. |
| EMEA | channel | —N/a | May 12, 2011 – September 30, 2020 | Sub-Saharan Africa | The Walt Disney Company Limited | Selected programming moved to Disney Channel and Disney+ following the channel's closure. |
| Latin America | channel | Jetix | July 3, 2009 – April 1, 2022 | Mexico/Caribbean, Central America/South America; all two feeds with English on second audio program | Disney Media Networks Latin America | Selected programming moved to Disney Channel and Disney+ which the channel closed on April 1, 2022 along with Disney Junior, FXM, Nat Geo Kids, Nat Geo Wild and Star Life due to company's restructuring policy. |
| Brazil | channel | Jetix | July 3, 2009 – April 1, 2022 | None | The Walt Disney Company Brazil | Selected programming moved to Disney Channel and Disney+ which the channel closed on April 1, 2022 along with Disney Junior, FXM, Nat Geo Kids, Nat Geo Wild and Star Life due to company's restructuring policy. |
| Netherlands | channel (timeshared daily with Veronica TV) | Jetix | January 1, 2010 – May 1, 2025 | None | Disney Channels (Benelux) B.V. | Replaced by Disney Jr. |
| Canada (relaunch) | channel | —N/a | December 1, 2015 – September 1, 2025 | None | Corus Entertainment | Closed alongside with Disney Jr., ABC Spark, La Chaîne Disney and Nickelodeon due to financial pressure at Corus Entertainment. |
