= DTour =

Canadian English-language specialty channel

- DTour logo
- Country: Canada
- Broadcast area: Nationwide
- Headquarters: Toronto, Ontario, Canada

Programming
- Picture format: 480i (SDTV); 1080i (HDTV)

Ownership
- Owner: Canwest (1997–2010); Shaw Media (2010–2016); Corus Entertainment (2016–present)
- Parent: TVTropolis G.P.
- Sister channels: Home Network; Flavour Network; W Network; Slice; National Geographic; Nat Geo Wild; History; Showcase; Global

History
- Launched: October 17, 1997; 29 years ago
- Former names: Prime (1997–2006); TVTropolis (2006–2013)

Links
- Website: DTour

DTour (styled as DTOUR, pronounced "detour") is a Canadian English language discretionary specialty channel owned by Corus Entertainment.

The channel was originally established by Canwest on October 17, 1997 as Prime, a cable companion to Global (and, later, CH) with a general entertainment format focusing on classic series. In 2006, the channel was relaunched as TVTropolis, shifting focus to sitcoms and dramas from the 1980s and 1990s, as well as pop culture-themed programs.

After adopting its current branding in 2013, DTour would adopt a lifestyle-based format, primarily airing acquired programming from the U.S.-based Travel Channel, while also airing limited general-interest programing. In March 2025, the channel returned to a general entertainment format with a focus on scripted programming.

== History ==
=== As Prime and TVTropolis ===
The channel was launched as Prime on October 17, 1997, under the ownership of Canwest. The Canadian Radio-television and Telecommunications Commission (CRTC) licensed Prime in 1996 as a specialty television service directed towards men and women 50 years of age and older. However, the channel did not explicitly market itself as a channel for the "baby boomer" generation, preferring instead to position itself as a general entertainment channel. Prime's slogan, on-air and in advertising, was "Canada's Entertainment Network". Prime's schedule featured a mix of general interest television programs, including home improvement and design series, along with classic television series.

With the launch of sibling channel DejaView in 2001, (showing similar programming to Prime, that being classic television programs from the 1960s, 1970s and 1980s), the channel's focus shifted to shows from the late 1980s and beyond.

On June 1, 2006, Prime was rebranded as TVTropolis, which initially focused on sitcoms and dramas from the 1980s and 1990s (such as Seinfeld and Beverly Hills 90210, branded under the slogan Hit TV Lives Here). Additional series focused on television pop culture (such as Inside the Box and FANatical). Over time, the channel lessened its emphasis on scripted shows and began airing more unscripted programming, including original series Wipeout Canada.

On October 27, 2010, Shaw Communications purchased Canwest after it had entered into creditor bankruptcy protection in late 2009. As a result, Shaw acquired control of Canwest's stake in TVtropolis and rebranded Canwest as Shaw Media. On January 14, 2013, Shaw announced that it would purchase the remaining interest in TVtropolis from Rogers Communications for $59 million, bringing its total to 100%.

=== As DTour ===
On June 5, 2013, at its annual upfront, Shaw conspicuously removed any reference to TVtropolis in announcing its fall programming plans, while announcing a "new" lifestyle channel named DTour (stylized as DTOUR). It was later confirmed through a Telus update to subscribers that DTour would be launched as a rebranded TVtropolis on August 26, 2013.

The channel initially focused on travel, leisure, and paranormal programming, much of which imported from the American cable network Travel Channel (then-owned by Scripps Networks Interactive, which at the time jointly owned the Canadian versions of Food Network, HGTV and DIY Network with Shaw).

On April 1, 2016, Shaw Media was sold to Corus Entertainment.

In March 2025, DTour dropped Warner Bros. Discovery-owned factual programming and reverted back to a general entertainment format; focusing on contemporary dramas and sitcoms from the 2000s and the 2010s, such as Supernatural, and Two and a Half Men The relaunch was anchored by first-run episodes of The CW drama All American moving to Dtour from sister network Showcase. Later that year in June, DTour was added to Corus' StackTV streaming service.

== Programming ==
DTour currently airs a mix of dramas and sitcoms, including Corus library programs to fufill CanCon requirements. The channel has previously aired vintage and classic television shows, animated series, reality series, and game shows.

== Logos ==
Logo as Prime (1997–2006)

First logo as TVtropolis (2006–2013)

Second logo as TVtropolis (2008–2013, only used on commercials)

Logo as DTour (2013–present)

== See also ==
- Wipeout Canada
- DejaView
- MovieTime
- Global
