= StackTV =

Canadian subscription video streaming package

- Website type: Internet television package
- Available in: English
- Headquarters: 25 Dockside Dr, Toronto, Ontario, Canada, Canada
- Country of origin: Canada
- Area served: Canada (nationwide)
- Owner: Corus Entertainment
- Website: www.stacktv.ca
- Registration: Optional
- Launched: June 3, 2019, 6 years ago
- Current status: Live

StackTV (stylized in all-caps as STACKTV) is a Canadian subscription video streaming package offered by Corus Entertainment. It was launched on June 3, 2019 and was originally offered through Amazon's Prime Video Channels; the offering launched shortly thereafter as an add-on for Amazon Prime subscribers.

StackTV functions similarly to a virtual multichannel video programming distributor (vMVPD, or "live TV" service), providing access to Corus-owned television channels, including both live linear feeds and on-demand programming during Corus' term of license. The service is intended for cord-cutters; providing access to Corus' linear channels through over-the-top (OTT) TV platforms.

StackTV was one of the first Canadian-based live TV streaming services; RiverTV would launch a year later in 2020.

== History ==
In contrast to the defunct subscription streaming service Shomi (which was operated as a joint venture between Rogers Sports & Media and Corus' sister company, Shaw Communications), StackTV initially offered no exclusive programming beyond that seen on Corus's linear networks and their own on-demand content. In December 2021, StackTV premiered Days of Our Lives: A Very Salem Christmas day-and-date with Peacock in the United States, prior to its linear premiere on W Network the following month.

In January 2022, Corus announced plans to offer StackTV through Rogers Cable's IPTV-based Ignite TV and SmartStream services.

In February 2022, the Canadian version of Lifetime was added to the service.

StackTV added the Disney-branded Corus kids' channels (Disney Channel, Disney Junior, and Disney XD) in December 2022.

In June 2025, the recently revamped DTour was added to the service.

On September 23, 2026, it was announced that the Global TV app would be relaunched as a StackTV-branded app. The change would occur on October 20, 2026, with the new app subsuming the free streaming content found on the Global TV website. A StackTV subscription via Prime Video is required to access DTour and Corus' kids networks.

== Programming ==
=== Current ===
As of September 2025:

- Adult Swim
- Cartoon Network Canada (formerly Teletoon)
- Disney Channel Canada
- DTour
- Flavour Network (formerly Food Network Canada)
- Global (BC, Calgary, Edmonton, Toronto, Halifax)
- The History Channel
- Home Network (formerly HGTV Canada)
- Lifetime Canada
- National Geographic
- Showcase
- Slice
- Treehouse TV
- W Network
- YTV

=== Former ===
- Disney Jr. Canada (ceased operations September 1, 2025)
- Disney XD Canada (ceased operations September 1, 2025)

== Reception ==
Corus announced in June 2020 that the service had 200,000 subscribers, with executives saying the service had become a "meaningful part of [the company's] portfolio". As of June 2021, the combined number of subscribers to StackTV and Corus' other Amazon-based service, Nick+, had increased to over 600,000 subscribers, similar to those of other streaming services.
