= Joel Eisenberg =

American novelist

Joel Eisenberg is an American writer-producer, whose current eight-book fantasy saga with co-author Steve Hillard, The Chronicles of Ara, was sold to Ovation TV for an eight-hour miniseries. The deal was unique for a network in that the series was published by the independent Incorgnito Press, and was printed digitally on-demand. He is represented by CAA.

Eisenberg wrote the movie Hollywood Vampyr starring Trevor Goddard and filming of the movie wrapped in early October 2000, but the film sat unreleased for two full years, finally being screened for the first time in September 2002.

In 2001, Eisenberg co-wrote Out of the Black with Karl Kozak, an independent feature that won 17 national film festival awards. The film starred Tyler Christopher, Jason Widener, Dee Wallace Stone, Sally Struthers and Sally Kirkland.

In 2004, Eisenberg, an avid book collector, was hired by a private party to identify, organize and archive a substantial lot of unidentified handwritten materials. These materials were soon verified as original John Steinbeck writings considered "lost" to history, and have been since referred to by a noted historian as "one of the most important literary discoveries of the century.”

In 2005, he wrote the non-fiction inspirational tome, How to Survive a Day Job, which featured contributions from established public figures as to how they survived the day job experience, en route to working professionally within the arts. Contributors included Clive Barker, Stephen J. Cannell, director Robert Wise (in his final interview), Brad Meltzer, Laurell Hamilton, Larry Hagman and others. Later that year, he co-founded All Cities Media with partner Eric Shaw, an entertainment-centric networking group hosted by Paramount Studios, Warner Brothers Studios, Sunset-Gower Studios and more. The goal of ACM was to level the playing field between filmmakers and finance. Eisenberg concluded his participation in the group in 2014.

April Showers was a film executive produced by Eisenberg, and released in 2009. Based on the Columbine School Shootings tragedy, April Showers was written and directed by Columbine survivor Andrew Robinson, and was awarded a special citation by the U.S. House of Representatives for its co-star Tom Arnold and his fight for the continuance of school safety standards.

He is developing several film projects, including the Alzheimer's-themed January Rain as co-writer and producer, and Louis vs Schmeling, a boxing biopic co-written with Gilbert Adler, to be directed by Bill Duke. Eisenberg is also executive producing Then Again with Herbie J Pilato, an Inside the Actors Studio-type talkfest focused on classic television, for Decades Network, a CBS and Weigel Broadcasting station, and Shadow Show with Vincent Price, based on the bestselling anthology edited by Sam Weller and Mort Castle, and the subsequent IDW Comics adaptation.

Since 2014, he has been penning the eight-volume The Chronicles of Ara fantasy novel series with Steve Hillard, a continuation of Hillard's book, Mirkwood: A Novel About J.R.R. Tolkien. Eisenberg and Hillard formed Mirkwood Partners, LLC in 2015, a feature film and television development company. In 2017, the company was renamed Council Tree Productions. Co-Production deals set up through Council Tree Productions include the reality-based Race For Space with Roddenberry Entertainment, Farway Canyon based on the independent comic book of the same name with Buffalo 8, and Terror Talk with the Roku station Terror TV.

Eisenberg has been writing professionally since 1986 in varied media, starting as a columnist for a series of national professional wrestling and martial arts periodicals. He has successfully marketed various projects to Public Television supporters for national and local program funding, including California's Gold with Huell Howser, American Playhouse, Masterpiece and The Puzzle Place.
