= Frissons TV =

- Frissons TV logo
- Country: Canada
- Broadcast area: National
- Headquarters: Montreal, Quebec

Ownership
- Owner: IO Média

History
- Launched: September 1, 2017; 7 years ago

Links
- Website: Frissons TV

Frissons TV is a Canadian French language commercial-free Category B television channel owned by IO Média. Frissons TV broadcasts programming focusing on the horror genre. Programming primarily includes classic and modern films, along with scripted television series.

== History ==
Before the launch of Frissons TV, a horror channel called SCREAM, was launched in 2001 by Corus Entertainment and Alliance Atlantis with the similar horror genre. The channel was rebranded to Dusk in 2009, but was later shut down and replaced by ABC Spark in 2012.

A year after Dusk ceased operations, in 2013, another attempt at a horror-based channel when Sylvain Gagné, owner of IO Média inc., announced plans to launch Frisson TV while having plans to launch a similar channel in English, called Terror TV. It was listed on the CRTC's List of Exempt Category B and Exempt Third-Language Services since 2013, a list identifying launched Category B television services without a CRTC-granted broadcasting licence due to a limited number of subscribers. This is despite the channel ever officially launching.

Original logo used until late 2018.

While focusing on the launch of Terror TV, it was decided to simultaneously launch a similar channel in French called Frissons TV, as both would be complementary to each other. Canadian Radio-television and Telecommunications Commission (CRTC) approval for Frissons TV was granted on April 2, 2014, describing the service as "a national, French-language specialty Category B service devoted to horror feature films, horror series as well as other programming such as magazine shows dedicated to the phenomenon of horror."

The same month of Frissons TV's CRTC-approval, Sylvain Gagné, through Callisto Television Corp. issued a press release announcing the launch of Terror TV in August or September of that year; however, the channel did not launch as intended. With successive attempts to launch Terror TV failing, Frissons TV was thought to be abandoned as it was initially thought to only be viable with an English language counterpart, however, further research by Callisto Television Corp. found that Frissons TV would be viable after all without Terror TV. In July 2017, IO Média inc. announced that it had reached a deal with Vidéotron to launch the service on September 1, 2017, in high definition. The channel launched its standard definition feed on December 15, 2017, when it was launched on several of BCE's platforms, including Bell Fibe and Bell Aliant Fibe.

In 2020, Frissons TV started producing its own original content and solicited the help of Montreal based horror film festival Cabane a Sang, to build a spinoff series of the festival. The 12 episode series was hosted by Frank Appache and Martin Richard, who helm Cabane a Sang Film Festival.
