= Global Reality Channel =

Canadian television channel

- Global Reality Channel logo
- Country: Canada
- Broadcast area: National

Programming
- Picture format: 480i (SDTV)

Ownership
- Owner: Shaw Media
- Sister channels: Global Television Network

History
- Launched: July 1, 2010; 15 years ago
- Closed: November 1, 2012; 13 years ago
- Replaced by: Nat Geo Wild

Global Reality Channel was a short-lived Canadian English language Category B specialty channel owned by Shaw Media. The channel broadcast reality television series and related programming. It was an offshoot of the Shaw-owned Global Television Network, which is now owned by Corus Entertainment.

== History ==
Canwest Global Communications, the channel's original owner, first attempted to launch a reality TV-based channel in the mid-2000s when the Canadian Radio-television and Telecommunications Commission (CRTC) granted Canwest approval to launch Reality TV, a channel "devoted exclusively to reality-based programming." However, the channel did not commence operations within the allotted time limit stated by the CRTC and the licence expired.

Determined to launch the channel, Canwest applied to the CRTC (through a joint subsidiary, Canwest Television Limited Partnership) for another reality TV-based channel also called Reality TV that was approved on October 14, 2009. The channel was described, through its nature of service, as "a national, English-language Category 2 specialty programming service devoted exclusively to reality-based programming, including competition-based reality and do-it-yourself makeover programs."

Before the channel was approved by the CRTC, Canwest filed for creditor protection in early October 2009. In February 2010, Shaw Communications announced it was purchasing Canwest's broadcasting assets.

The channel was launched on July 1, 2010, as "Global Reality Channel". On October 27 that year, Shaw finalized its purchase of Canwest, renaming the company Shaw Media, and took control of Global Reality Channel.

At the Shaw Media upfronts on May 30, 2012, Shaw Media announced the 2012 fall schedules of all its terrestrial stations and specialty channels; however, Global Reality Channel was not included in the upfronts. The following day, Rogers announced that it would be adding Nat Geo Wild, a recently launched Shaw Media channel, by replacing Global Reality Channel on August 1, 2012. Effectively, this meant Nat Geo Wild would launch the same way it did in the United States in June 2010, as NGW replaced Fox Reality Channel in the United States, though there was very little similar between Fox and Global's reality channel efforts.

This would result in MTS as the only remaining distributor of the channel, assuming no other distributors begin carrying the channel. Following the upfronts and Rogers announcement, speculation and online gossip, citing various sources, arose stating that Global Reality Channel would be ceasing operations on August 1, 2012. Despite Rogers' initial intention to launch Nat Geo Wild in August, only days later in early June, Rogers added Nat Geo Wild without replacing Global Reality Channel.

On August 1, 2012, MTS confirmed the channel's closure by displaying the following message on channel 255:

"Global Reality going out of business August 1, 2012. Global Reality, channel 225 in the Rewind theme group, is going out of business August 1, 2012. All MTS TV customers have been receiving this channel for free since June 26. MTS TV is looking for a channel to replace Global Reality so your pricing for this theme group will not change"

Global Reality Channel ceased operations on November 1, 2012, while its license was officially revoked on April 19, 2016, nearly four years after the channel went off the air in 2012.

== Programming ==
Global Reality Channel featured a lineup devoted to primarily reality television series. The channel also broadcast game shows and documentary-style series related to reality television.
