= Ashley Spires =

Canadian children's book author and illustrator

- Born: 1977 or 1978 (age 48–49); Tsawwassen, British Columbia; Canada
- Education: Emily Carr University of Art and Design; Sheridan College
- Occupations: Children's book author and illustrator

Ashley Spires is a Canadian children's book author and illustrator. She is the creator of the Binky the Space Cat graphic novels series and the 2014 bestseller, The Most Magnificent Thing.

== Biography ==
Spires was born and raised in Tsawwassen, British Columbia. She studied photography at the Emily Carr University of Art and Design, where she was inspired to pursue illustration after taking a class on book-making.

After graduation, she earned a contract with Lobster Press, for which she illustrated Peter Kuitenbrouwer's 2004 book, Our Song: The Story of O Canada, the Canadian National Anthem. She later attended a postgraduate illustration program at Ontario's Sheridan College.

Spires is the author and illustrator of the Binky the Space Cat graphic novel series, about a cat who believes his house is a space station. The first book in the series, Binky the Space Cat, won the 2011 Silver Birch Express Award, presented by the Ontario Library Association. On September 7, 2019, a TV series based on the series, called Agent Binky: Pets of the Universe, premiered on Treehouse TV.

Spires's 2014 book, The Most Magnificent Thing, earned a starred review from Kirkus and was listed among the ALA Notable Books for Children 2015. It has sold over 500,000 copies and been translated into multiple languages. The book was adapted into a 22-minute animated short film directed by Arna Selznick, featuring narration by Whoopi Goldberg and voice acting by Lilly Bartlam and Alison Pill. It aired on Canadian children's channel YTV in 2019 and was shown at a number of film festivals, including the 2019 San Diego International Film Festival and the 2019 Chicago International Children's Film Festival.

== Selected works ==
As author and illustrator:

- Binky the Space Cat (2009) ISBN 978-1-55453-419-7
- Binky to the Rescue (2010) ISBN 978-1554535972
- Binky Under Pressure (2011) ISBN 978-1554537679
- Small Saul (2011) ISBN 978-1-55453-503-3
- Binky Takes Charge (2012) ISBN 978-1554537686
- Larf (2012) ISBN 978-1554537013
- Binky License to Scratch (2013)
- Edie's Ensembles (2014) ISBN 978-1-77049- 490-9
- The Most Magnificent Thing (2014) ISBN 978-1554537044
- Gordon: Bark To The Future! (2016)
- Fluffy Strikes Back (2016) ISBN 978-1-77138-127-7
- Over-scheduled Andrew (2017) ISBN 978-1770494848
- The Thing Lou Couldn't Do (2017) ISBN 978-1771387279
- Fairy Science (2019) ISBN 9780525581390

As illustrator only:

- The Red Shoes, by Eleri Glass (2008) ISBN 978-1894965781
- Ella's Umbrellas, by Jennifer Lloyd (2010) ISBN 978-1-89747-623-9
- Spare Dog Parts, by Alison Hughes (2016) ISBN 978-1459807044
