= Agent Binky: Pets of the Universe =

2019 Canadian television series

- Series poster
- Genre: Animation
- Based on: The Binky the Space Cat series by Ashley Spires
- Developed by: Carolyn Hay; Hugh Duffy
- Written by: Andrew Sabiston; Patrick Granleese; Miles Smith; Andrew Shenkman; Phil Ivanusic-Vallée; Louise Moon; J.D. Smith; Evany Rosen; Jiro C. Okada; Hugh Duffy; Carolyn Hay; Madeleine Donohue
- Directed by: Derek Prout; Ruth Ramirez (season 1)
- Voices of: Jesse Camacho; Paul Braunstein; Aurora Browne; Melody Johnson; Boyd Banks; Dan Chameroy; Katie Griffin; Tyler James Nathan; Jonathan Tan; Isabella Leo; Richard Binsley; Zachary Bennett
- Theme music composer: Meiro Stamm
- Opening theme: "Agent Binky Theme Song" by Meiro Stamm
- Ending theme: "Agent Binky Theme Song" (instrumental)
- Composers: Carl Lenox; Andy McNeil
- Country of origin: Canada
- Original language: English
- No. of seasons: 3
- No. of episodes: 78 (156 segments)

Production
- Executive producers: Scott Dyer; Athena Georgaklis; Ashley Spires
- Producer: Lydia Ferreira
- Running time: 22 minutes
- Production companies: Nelvana; Redknot

Original release
- Network: Treehouse TV
- Release: September 7, 2019 – March 31, 2024

Agent Binky: Pets of the Universe, or simply Agent Binky, is a Canadian animated television series loosely based on the Kids Can Press graphic novel series by Ashley Spires, that premiered on Treehouse TV in Canada on September 7, 2019. The series is developed by Carolyn Hay and Hugh Duffy, and produced by Nelvana. 78 episodes were produced.

== Premise ==
The series follows the adventures of Binky, a young black and white housecat, who is on a mission to protect his human family (Big Human and Small Human) from “interstellar threats” as part of an agency called P.U.R.S.T. (Pets of the Universe Ready for Space Travel); the team also consists of Genius Gordon the corgi, Captain Gracie the cat, Young Nola the box turtle and Grumpy Loo the goldfish. P.U.R.S.T. are on the case from the Persian cat boss known as Sergeant Fluffy Vandermere. However, the “aliens” that the P.U.R.S.T. team fight are actually no more than ordinary household bugs.

== Characters ==
- Binky (voiced by Jesse Camacho) is a pear-shaped, green-eyed tuxedo cat who is the main protagonist of the series. Binky is the leader of the P.U.R.S.T. agents, and he has a purple toy mouse named "Ted" and has a purple sweater called "Fuzzy Wuzzy".
- Gordon (voiced by Paul Braunstein) is a brown and white corgi who lives with Binky and his family. He likes inventing things.
- Captain Gracie (voiced by Aurora Browne) is a greyish-brown tabby cat and captain of the P.U.R.S.T crew who lives next door to her teammates.
- Nola (voiced by Melody Johnson) is a green box turtle who loves seashells and is loo's best friend.
- Loo (voiced by Boyd Banks) is a self-centered goldfish and Nola's best friend who is quite a bit grumpy.
- Sergeant Fluffy Vandermere (voiced by Dan Chameroy) is a Persian cat who is the boss and leader of P.U.R.S.T.
- Big Human (voiced by Katie Griffin) is the mother of Small Human.
- Small Human (voiced by Tyler James Nathan) is the son of Big Human and the gang's owners.
- Chirpy McChirp (voiced by Matt Folliott) is a blue budgerigar who acts as the main antagonist of the show. He was rescued by Small Human in "Who's the WURST" and is shown unable making/getting it into integrating the ranks of the protectors and traps the team outside the station in order to take possession of all of Gordon's gadgets before forming his own team W.U.R.S.T (wings of the Universe ready for space travel).
- Amelia (voiced by Julie Lemieux) is a bat and P.U.R.S.T agent who first appeared in "Happy PURSTgiving".
- Mini Human (voiced by Isabella Leo) is the daughter of Tall Human.
- Tall Human (voiced by Jonathan Tan) is the father of Mini Human.
- Darrell (voiced by Zachary Bennett) is a hamster who is Fluffy's assistant.
- New Backup Human is the agents' babysitter who substituted for Backup Human in "Adventures in Pet-Sitting".
- Gobble (voiced by Richard Binsley) is a robot Gordon invented in "Gobble's Gotta Go".
- Freddy (voiced by Kwaku Adu-poku) is a handicapped dog who Gordon befriend's and is a P.U.R.S.T agent in training.
- Professor coo (voiced by Bianca Alongi) is an absent-minded pigeon and member of W.U.R.S.T.
- Eddie Lizard (voiced by Julius Cho) is a lizard and member of W.U.R.S.T who wears cardboard wings to pretend he's a bird. His name is possibly a reference to British actor and stand-up comedian Eddie Izzard.
- Chuck (voiced by Elley-Ray Hennessy) is a duck with a plunger as a prosthetic leg and member of W.U.R.S.T and is friends with Loo.
- Fizz (voiced by Maiko Watson) is a bunny and P.U.R.S.T agent who is part of the sneaky squad (a group of PURST agents who work outside full-time).
- Si Si (voiced by Ainsley Diaz) is a chihuahua and junior P.U.R.S.T agent who often gets overexcited and distracted.
- Fun human (voiced by Rick Miller) is Small Human's grandfather who becomes Si Si's owner.
- Ira (Voiced by Rob Greenwood) is a frog and member of W.U.R.S.T who likes things to be neat and likes to clean up.
- Marryl, Sherryl, and Carryl (voiced by Elena Juatco, Shoshana Sperling and Gwynne Phillips) are three hamsters and Darrell's sisters who work at P.U.R.S.T HQ.
- Additional voices - Taylor Abrahamse, David Berni, Neil Crone, Stacey DePass, Dwayne Hill, Rebecca Husain, Nissae Isen, Tajja Isen, Bryn McAuley, Scott McCord, Terry McGurrin (also a story supervisor), Annick Obonsawin, Grant Palmer, Dan Petronijevic, Cara Pifko, Jacqueline Pillon, Joe Pingue, Erin Pitt, Andrew Sabiston, Robert Tinkler, Breanna Yde and Drew Adkins.

== Production ==
On September 19, 2018, it was announced that Nelvana would adapt the Kids Can Press graphic novel series "Binky the Space Cat" by Ashley Spires into an animated television series titled "P.U.R.S.T. Agent Binky". Agent Binky: Pets of the Universe was picked up for 52 11-minute episodes (often broadcast as 26 22-minutes) and was set to be released in 2019. The following February, it was revealed that the series was retitled to Agent Binky: Pets of the Universe, making it one of the first produced by redknot, a joint venture between Nelvana and Discovery Communications to produce content for Canada, Latin America and the rest of the world.

On January 7, 2021, Agent Binky: Pets of the Universe was renewed for a second season of another 52 11-minute episodes. The second season premiered in 2022.

== Episodes ==
Season	Episodes	Originally released	
Season	Episodes	First released	Last released
1	26	September 7, 2019	February 23, 2020
2	26	April 11, 2022	November 12, 2022
3	26	March 19, 2023	March 31, 2024

=== Season 1 (2019–20) ===
Every season consists of 52 11-minute episodes.

No.	Title	Directed by	Written by	Storyboard by	Original release date	Prod. code
1	"No Moussie Left Behind"	Derek Prout	Hugh Duffy and Carolyn Hay	Ruth Ramirez and Jason Armstrong	September 7, 2019	101
1	"Dragonfly Away!"	Derek Prout	Hugh Duffy and Carolyn Hay	Ruth Ramirez and Jason Armstrong	September 7, 2019	101
Ted is accidentally sent into space. The gang is excited for a sleepover with Captain Gracie.
2	"A Fly in My Fluff"	Derek Prout	Phil Ivanusic-Vallee	Nicholas Hehn and Rob Walton	September 8, 2019	112
2	"Fly Me to Balloon"	Derek Prout	Miles Smith	Nicholas Hehn and Rob Walton	September 8, 2019	112
An alien lands in Sergeant Fluffy Vandermere's soup. Small Human comes home with a robot-shaped balloon.
3	"Glow Away"	Derek Prout	Andrew Sabiston	James Caswell and Rob Walton	September 15, 2019	108
3	"Space Station Flappy"	Derek Prout	Miles Smith	James Caswell and Rob Walton	September 15, 2019	108
The team must come up with a P.U.R.S.T. anthem. The humans stay up overnight in a backyard tent (which P.U.R.S.T. thinks is outer space).
4	"Chew Chew Challenge"	Derek Prout	Phil Ivanusic-Vallée	Jason Armstrong and Eugene McDermott	September 22, 2019	109
4	"Ice Cream Shuttle"	Derek Prout	Miles Smith	Jason Armstrong and Eugene McDermott	September 22, 2019	109
The team sees aliens eating a tree house (named after the show's broadcaster). The team takes back an ice cream shuttle from an alien (codename: bees).
5	"Dog Gone Cat"	Derek Prout	Andrew Shenkman	Nicholas Hehn and Rob Walton	September 29, 2019	114
5	"PURST Games"	Derek Prout	Andrew Shenkman	Nicholas Hehn and Rob Walton	September 29, 2019	114
When Gordon is impressed with Binky and Gracie's feline abilities, the two train him to be a cat. The annual P.U.R.S.T. games are interrupted when an alien (codename: grasshopper) appears to be a competitor in the event.
6	"Hit the Road, Roach"	Derek Prout	Phil Ivanusic-Vallee	Nicholas Hehn and Rodney King	October 6, 2019	105
6	"Vacuum Vamoose"	Derek Prout	Phil Ivanusic-Vallee	Nicholas Hehn and Rodney King	October 6, 2019	105
The team discovers Captain Gracie's whistle has been taken by an alien. The team chases after an alien rover in their space station.
7	"Pumpking"	Derek Prout	Phil Ivanusic-Vallée	Nicolas Hehn and Rob Walton	October 13, 2019	118
7	"Happy PURSTgiving"	Derek Prout	Phil Ivanusic-Vallée	Nicolas Hehn and Rob Walton	October 13, 2019	118
The agents see Small Human's beloved mini-planet, a pumpkin, being taken over by aliens. Amelia joins the agents for PURSTgiving Dinner in the "Room of Many Boxes".
8	"Soup-A-Nova"	Derek Prout	Patrick Granleese	Jason Armstrong and Rob Walton	October 20, 2019	106
8	"Bad Fur Day"	Derek Prout	Miles Smith	Jason Armstrong and Rob Walton	October 20, 2019	106
When Small Human gets a cold, Binky and the team decide to make him some soup to help cure him. Binky gets back from the vet's and is COMPLETELY shaved, making the others think he is an alien.
9	"Bye Bye Butterfly"	Derek Prout	Andrew Sabiston	Rodney King and Rob Walton	October 27, 2019	102
9	"Robots Gotta Go"	Derek Prout	Miles Smith	Rodney King and Rob Walton	October 27, 2019	102
P.U.R.S.T. encounters an alien that changes from a caterpillar butterfly. Binky tries to get Small Human and Big Human's attention while they enjoy their new massage chair.
10	"Roamer Rescue"	Derek Prout	Andrew Sabiston	Jason Armstrong and Rob Walton	November 3, 2019	104
10	"Snack Attack"	Derek Prout	Miles Smith	Jason Armstrong and Rob Walton	November 3, 2019	104
Ted's space roamer is taken over by an alien. Aliens remove a piece of fruit that belongs to Small Human.
11	"#3 Flea Fling"	Derek Prout	Phil Ivanusic-Vallée	Nicolas Hehn and Rodney King	November 10, 2019	103
11	"Free Fuzzy Wuzzy!"	Derek Prout	Louise Moon	Nicolas Hehn and Rodney King	November 10, 2019	103
Gordon is taken over by very small aliens (codename: fleas), and the P.U.R.S.T. team has to get rid of them. Binky's favorite purple sweater (Fuzzy Wuzzy) is being eaten up by aliens (codename: moths), and it's up to the team to stop the aliens and save Fuzzy Wuzzy.
12	"Parcel Panic"	Derek Prout	Jiro C. Okada	Rodney King, Jason Armstrong and Nicolas Hehn	November 17, 2019	107
12	"Chirp Chirp"	Derek Prout	Phil Ivanusic-Vallée	Rodney King, Jason Armstrong and Nicolas Hehn	November 17, 2019	107
When an alien (codename: bee) buzzes around a parcel, the agents must retrieve the parcel before it falls into the alien's hands. There is a mysterious sound heard in the space station and Binky realizes it's an alien (codename: cricket).
13	"Green Gobblers"	Derek Prout	Patrick Granleese	Nicolas Hehn and Rob Walton	November 24, 2019	110
13	"Gobble's Gotta Go"	Derek Prout	Miles Smith	Nicolas Hehn and Rob Walton	November 24, 2019	110
When Binky refuses to eat a new green cat food, aliens (codename: bugs) crawl out of the bag. Meanwhile, the humans order pizza. Gordon invents a machine to clean up messes and throw them in different places, but Binky notices a bunch of aliens (codename: ants).
14	"Undercover of the Night"	Derek Prout	Story by : Evany Rosen; Teleplay by : Hugh Duffy & Carolyn Hay	Eugene McDermott and Jason Armstrong	December 1, 2019	111
14	"Unidentified FUN Object"	Derek Prout	Phil Ivanusic-Vallée	Eugene McDermott and Jason Armstrong	December 1, 2019	111
Gordon and Binky hear a bump in the night, where they find a new agent, Amelia, in the Room of Many Boxes. Gordon accidentally throws Small Human.
15	"Moussie Mischief"	Derek Prout	Patrick Granleese	Eugene McDermott and Jason Armstrong	December 8, 2019	113
15	"Who's the WURST"	Derek Prout	Patrick Granleese	Eugene McDermott and Jason Armstrong	December 8, 2019	113
When Ted lands in a laundry bin with an alien circling it, the team assumes that the alien's evil plan is to make Ted have a bath. When Small Human rescues a budgie, it turns out "Chirpy" is a disgruntled bird who could not get into P.U.R.S.T.
16	"T'was the Night Before PURSTmas"	Derek Prout	Hugh Duffy & Carolyn Hay	Eugene McDermott and Jason Armstrong	December 15, 2019	115
16	"We Wish You a Merry PURSTmas"	Derek Prout	Miles Smith	Eugene McDermott and Jason Armstrong	December 15, 2019	115
17	"Purrfect Present"	Derek Prout	Andrew Shenkman	Nicholas Hehn and Rob Walton	December 22, 2019	116
17	"Stickin' Together"	Derek Prout	Phil Invanusic-Vallée	Nicholas Hehn and Rob Walton	December 22, 2019	116
The P.U.R.S.T. team makes a present for Fluffy's birthday, but an alien (codename: bee) shows up to try and take the flowers. Nola takes the threat from a possible stick bug which could be an alien (codename: housefly).
18	"Gordon's Buddy-Bot"	Derek Prout	J.D. Smith	Eugene McDermott and Jason Armstrong	December 29, 2019	117
18	"Adventures in Pet Sitting"	Derek Prout	Patrick Granleese	Eugene McDermott and Jason Armstrong	December 29, 2019	117
Gordon builds his own robo-pet who wreaks havoc on the station and in missions. When a new human shows up to pet-sit the agents while the Humans are out, they have to discover whether she's going to turn the agents into aliens or not. (This is the debut of New Backup Human.)
19	"Lights, Camera, Agents"	Derek Prout	J.D. Smith	Nicholas Hehn and Eugene McDermott	January 5, 2020	119
19	"A Walk in the Park"	Derek Prout	Miles Smith	Nicholas Hehn and Eugene McDermott	January 5, 2020	119
Fluffy assigns the team to make an instructional video for future P.U.R.S.T. cadets. Gordon builds a robotic dog so his P.U.R.S.T. pals can ride inside it and join him in the park.
20	"Puzzlers"	Derek Prout	Patrick Granleese	Rob Walton and Nicholas Hehn	January 12, 2020	120
20	"Little Stinker"	Derek Prout	Miles Smith	Rob Walton and Nicholas Hehn	January 12, 2020	120
The P.U.R.S.T. team go on a mission to find the last piece of a jigsaw puzzle. Gordon rummages through the trash.
21	"Dog Day"	Derek Prout	Andrew Shenkman	Jason Armstrong and Rob Walton	January 19, 2020	121
21	"Loo Rocks"	Derek Prout	Miles Smith	Jason Armstrong and Rob Walton	January 19, 2020	121
Gordon has a day where he kicks back and fiddles with his gadgets, resulting in the space station being locked from the inside. Small Human comes home with an instrument.
22	"Astounding Sounds"	Derek Prout	Andrew Shenkman	Eugene McDermott and Nicholas Hehn	January 26, 2020	122
22	"Dolly Folly"	Derek Prout	Hugh Duffy and Carolyn Hay	Eugene McDermott and Nicholas Hehn	January 26, 2020	122
The agents don't understand the noises they hear. The agents are babysitters for a day.
23	"Binky Bunny"	Derek Prout	Patrick Granleese	Rob Walton and Jason Armstrong	February 2, 2020	123
23	"Dig Dog"	Derek Prout	Phil Ivanusic-Vallee	Rob Walton and Jason Armstrong	February 2, 2020	123
When the pets mistake chocolate eggs hidden around the station as alien eggs, they gather all of them before they hatch. Binky accidentally destroys one of Gordon's properties.
24	"Light Fright"	Derek Prout	Miles Smith	Eugene McDermott and Jason Armstrong	February 9, 2020	124
24	"Loo on the Loose"	Derek Prout	Andrew Shenkman	Eugene McDermott and Jason Armstrong	February 9, 2020	124
When Amelia gets trapped in the space station during a night patrol, the team discovers she has a fear of the light. After a series of mishaps, Loo decides he's a bunny and escapes.
25	"PURST Pearl"	Ruth Ramirez	Phil Ivanisuic-Vallee	Nicholas Hehn and Jason Armstrong	February 16, 2020	125
25	"Blanky Boo-Boo"	Ruth Ramirez	Phil Ivanisuic-Vallee	Nicholas Hehn and Jason Armstrong	February 16, 2020	125
The team discovers a pearl. The Humans have a yard sale, but they accidentally attempt to sell Gordon's blanket, as well as them encountering aliens (codename: bugs) that Gordon thinks will taking it into outer space. So the team tries to distract whoever thinks of buying it (Mini Human and Tall Human).
26	"Pets of the Universe"	Derek Prout and Ruth Ramirez	Miles Smith	Rob Walton, Ruth Ramirez and Eugene McDermott	February 23, 2020	126
26	"Ready for Space Travel"	Derek Prout and Ruth Ramirez	Phil Ivanusic-Vallee	Rob Walton, Ruth Ramirez and Eugene McDermott	February 23, 2020	126
The team is sent to the vet's. The team finds a secret place underneath the vet's with all of the aliens they encountered.

=== Season 2 (2022) ===
No.	Title	Directed by	Written by	Storyboard by	Original release date	Prod. code
1	"Up Up and Away!"	Derek Prout	Philippe Ivanusic-Vallee	Alex Szewczuk	April 11, 2022	TBA
2	"Roundy Round Up!"	Derek Prout	Ashley Spires	Robert Walton	April 11, 2022	TBA
3	"Talky Trouble"	Derek Prout	Andrew Shenkman	Greg Collinson	April 12, 2022	TBA
4	"Nola's New Friend"	Derek Prout	Jay Vaidya	Nicholas Hehn	April 12, 2022	TBA
5	"PURST Pod Rodeo"	Derek Prout	Miles Smith	Ron Wilson	April 13, 2022	TBA
6	"The Book of PURST"	Derek Prout	Andrew Shenkman	Alex Szewczuk	April 13, 2022	TBA
7	"Ted Alert"	Derek Prout	Betsy Walters	Robert Walton	April 14, 2022	TBA
8	"Shrinker Stinker"	Derek Prout	Andrew Shenkman	Greg Collinson	April 14, 2022	TBA
9	"The Paw and Claw Spa"	Derek Prout	Carolyn Hay and Hugh Duffy	Nicholas Hehn	April 15, 2022	TBA
10	"Wishful Thinking"	Derek Prout	Miles Smith	Ron Wilson	April 15, 2022	TBA
11	"Lights Out"	Derek Prout	Ashley Spires	Alex Szewczuk	April 16, 2022	TBA
12	"Go Go Gracie"	Derek Prout	Philippe Ivanusic-Vallee	Robert Walton	April 16, 2022	TBA
13	"Get Ready Eddie"	Derek Prout	Carolyn Hay	Kerry Sargent	April 17, 2022	TBA
14	"Stand by Your Human"	Derek Prout	Amanda Smith	Nicholas Hehn	April 17, 2022	TBA
15	"Stuck in the Middle"	Derek Prout	Desmond Sargeant	Ron Wilson	April 23, 2022	TBA
16	"Quacking Up"	Derek Prout	Andrew Shenkman	Alex Szewczuk	April 23, 2022	TBA
17	"Spiffy Space Suit"	Derek Prout	Miles Smith	Robert Walton	April 24, 2022	TBA
18	"Flying the Coo-oop!"	Derek Prout	Ashley Spires	Kerry Sargent	April 24, 2022	TBA
19	"At Ease, Fluffy"	Derek Prout	Philippe Ivanusic-Vallee	Nicholas Hehn	April 30, 2022	TBA
20	"A Real Dust Up!"	Derek Prout	Amanda Smith	Ron Wilson	April 30, 2022	TBA
21	"Si Si Says Si Si"	Derek Prout	Miles Smith	Alex Szewczuk	May 1, 2022	TBA
22	"Deep Space, Noooo!"	Derek Prout	Andrew Shenkman	Robert Walton	May 1, 2022	TBA
23	"Pet Project"	Derek Prout	Desmond Sargeant	Kerry Sargent and Nicholas Hehn	May 7, 2022	TBA
24	"Pizza Panic"	Derek Prout	Amanda Smith	Elizabeth Estee	May 7, 2022	TBA
25	"A Tad Bad Situation"	Derek Prout	Sheila Rogerson	Ron Wilson	May 8, 2022	TBA
26	"The Thunder Home"	Derek Prout	Ashley Spires	Alex Szewczuk	May 8, 2022	TBA
27	"Agent Antics"	Derek Prout	Andrew Shenkman	Robert Walton	May 14, 2022	TBA
28	"Tyrannosaurus Rascal"	Derek Prout	Philippa Marvin	Kerry Sargent	May 14, 2022	TBA
29	"The Zoomies"	Derek Prout	Philippe Ivanusic-Vallee	Nicholas Hehn	May 15, 2022	TBA
30	"Vegging Out"	Derek Prout	Miles Smith	Todd Sullivan	May 15, 2022	TBA
31	"Spring Into Action"	Derek Prout	Sheila Rogerson	Alex Szewczuk	May 21, 2022	TBA
32	"WURST Stink Ever"	Derek Prout	Philippe Ivanusic-Vallee	Robert Walton	May 21, 2022	TBA
33	"Hairy and Scary"	Derek Prout	Desmond Sargeant	Kerry Sargent and Lynn Reist	October 15, 2022	TBA
34	"Tricky Treat Hunt"	Derek Prout	Ashley Spires	Nicholas Hehn and Ron Wilson	October 15, 2022	TBA
35	"Cuckoo for Cuckoo Clock!"	Derek Prout	Amanda Smith	Todd Sullivan	September 17, 2022	TBA
36	"Robo-Pests"	Derek Prout	Miles Smith	Alex Szewczuk	September 17, 2022	TBA
37	"Throw Me a Cone"	Derek Prout	Madeleine Donohue	Robert Walton	September 24, 2022	TBA
38	"Don't You Be My Valentine"	Derek Prout	Miles Smith	Ron Wilson, Elizabeth Estee and Crystal Ching Cheung	September 24, 2022	TBA
39	"The WURST Party"	Derek Prout	Ashley Spires	Nicholas Hehn	October 1, 2022	TBA
40	"Mission Earth Day"	Derek Prout	Andrew Shenkman	Todd Sullivan	October 1, 2022	TBA
41	"Fishpionage!"	Derek Prout	Madeleine Donohue	Rob Risek	October 8, 2022	TBA
42	"Tree's a Crowd"	Derek Prout	Sheila Rogerson	Alex Szewczuk	October 8, 2022	TBA
43	"Hops & Hiccups"	Derek Prout	Desmond Sargeant	Elizabeth Estee	October 22, 2022	TBA
44	"The PURST Awards"	Derek Prout	Philippa Marvin	Nicholas Hehn	October 22, 2022	TBA
45	"Adventures in PURST Sitting"	Derek Prout	Ashley Spires	Kirk Jorgensen	November 12, 2022	TBA
46	"Snow Alien"	Derek Prout	Tony Tran	Todd Sullivan	November 12, 2022	TBA
47	"Hide and Eek!"	Derek Prout	Andrew Shenkman	Alex Szewczuk	October 29, 2022	TBA
48	"Tooth or Dare"	Derek Prout	Miles Smith	Elizabeth Estee	October 29, 2022	TBA
49	"School Daze"	Derek Prout	Amanda Smith	Nicholas Hehn	November 6, 2022	TBA
50	"Finding Ted"	Derek Prout	Sheila Rogerson	Todd Sullivan	November 6, 2022	TBA
51	"I'll Be Watching Mew"	Derek Prout	Ashley Spires	Kirk Jorgensen	November 5, 2022	TBA
52	"Grounded Gracie"	Derek Prout	Ashley Spires	Alex Szewczuk	November 5, 2022	TBA

=== Season 3 (2023–24) ===
No.	Title	Directed by	Written by	Storyboard by	Original release date	Prod. code
1	"Scrappy Campers"	Derek Prout	Story by : Miles Smith, Hugh Duffy and Carolyn Hay; Teleplay by : Miles Smith	Steve Remen, Elizabeth Estee and Nicholas Hehn	March 19, 2023	TBA
2	"The New Nola"	Derek Prout	Madeleine Donohue	Todd Sullivan and Kirk Jorgensen	March 25, 2023	TBA
2	"Commander Kibbles"	Derek Prout	Miles Smith	Todd Sullivan and Kirk Jorgensen	March 25, 2023	TBA
3	"Hot Enough for Ya"	Derek Prout	Philippa Marvin	Alex Szewczuk and Steve Remen	April 1, 2023	TBA
3	"Substitute Agent"	Derek Prout	Andrew Shenkman	Alex Szewczuk and Steve Remen	April 1, 2023	TBA
4	"The Blocky Blockies"	Derek Prout	Andrew Shenkman	Elizabeth Estee and Todd Sullivan	April 8, 2023	TBA
4	"Fun Human"	Derek Prout	Ashley Spires	Elizabeth Estee and Todd Sullivan	April 8, 2023	TBA
5	"Rocketing Rocket House"	Derek Prout	Miles Smith	Kirk Jorgensen and Alex Szewczuk	April 15, 2023	TBA
5	"Crouching Kitty, Crane Invasion"	Derek Prout	Philippa Marvin	Kirk Jorgensen and Alex Szewczuk	April 15, 2023	TBA
6	"Sleep Walkies"	Derek Prout	Andrew Shenkman	Steve Remen and Nicholas Hehn	April 22, 2023	TBA
6	"The Fast and the Furriest"	Derek Prout	Madeleine Donohue	Steve Remen and Nicholas Hehn	April 22, 2023	TBA
7	"Picture Purst"	Derek Prout	Ashley Spires	Todd Sullivan and Kirk Jorgenson	April 29, 2023	TBA
7	"Supernanny!"	Derek Prout	Madeleine Donohue	Todd Sullivan and Kirk Jorgenson	April 29, 2023	TBA
8	"Escape from Gordon's Lab"	Derek Prout	Philippa Marvin	Alex Szewczuk and Steve Remen	May 6, 2023	TBA
8	"Two Can Toucan"	Derek Prout	Miles Smith	Alex Szewczuk and Steve Remen	May 6, 2023	TBA
9	"Wings on Wheels"	Derek Prout	Ashley Spires	Elizabeth Estee and Todd Sullivan	May 13, 2023	TBA
9	"Bee Be Gone!"	Derek Prout	Miles Smith	Elizabeth Estee and Todd Sullivan	May 13, 2023	TBA
10	"Yummy Yoinks"	Derek Prout	Andrew Shenkman	Kirk Jorgensen and Alex Szewczuk	May 20, 2023	TBA
10	"One Froggy Day"	Derek Prout	Sheila Rogerson	Kirk Jorgensen and Alex Szewczuk	May 20, 2023	TBA
11	"Spooky Spa Day"	Derek Prout	Andrew Shenkman	Steve Remen and Nicholas Hehn	October 22, 2023	TBA
11	"Tidy Up Little Froggy"	Derek Prout	Ashley Spires	Steve Remen and Nicholas Hehn	October 22, 2023	TBA
12	"A Prickly Situation"	Derek Prout	Philippa Marvin	Todd Sullivan and Kirk Jorgensen	September 3, 2023	TBA
12	"Framing Game"	Derek Prout	Andrew Shenkman	Todd Sullivan and Kirk Jorgensen	September 3, 2023	TBA
13	"Watch Your Steps"	Derek Prout	Andrew Shenkman	Alex Szewczuk and Steve Remen	September 10, 2023	TBA
13	"A Guide to Being the Wurst"	Derek Prout	Ashley Spires	Alex Szewczuk and Steve Remen	September 10, 2023	TBA
14	"Outta Control Upgrade"	Derek Prout	Madeleine Donohue	Elizabeth Estee and Todd Sullivan	November 5, 2023	TBA
14	"Night Light"	Derek Prout	Desmond Sargeant	Elizabeth Estee and Todd Sullivan	November 5, 2023	TBA
15	"Gone Astray"	Derek Prout	Philippa Marvin	Kirk Jorgensen and Alex Szewczuk	September 17, 2023	TBA
15	"Saving Si Si"	Derek Prout	Andrew Shenkman	Kirk Jorgensen and Alex Szewczuk	September 17, 2023	TBA
16	"The Binky Blues"	Derek Prout	Ashley Spires	Steve Remen and Elizabeth Estee	November 12, 2023	TBA
16	"The Baddest Boing"	Derek Prout	Madeleine Donohue	Steve Remen and Elizabeth Estee	November 12, 2023	TBA
17	"Purst Picnic"	Derek Prout	Philippa Marvin	Todd Sullivan and Kirk Jorgensen	October 15, 2023	TBA
17	"Gracie, Myself and I"	Derek Prout	Desmond Sargent	Todd Sullivan and Kirk Jorgensen	October 15, 2023	TBA
18	"The Chair Affair"	Derek Prout	Andrew Shenkman	Alex Szewczuk and Steve Remen	October 8, 2023	TBA
18	"Space Pets"	Derek Prout	Ashley Spires	Alex Szewczuk and Steve Remen	October 8, 2023	TBA
19	"Birdhouse Hassle"	Derek Prout	Madeleine Donohue	Elizabeth Estee and Todd Sullivan	November 26, 2023	TBA
19	"Darryl's Big Day"	Derek Prout	Philippe Ivanusic-Vollee	Elizabeth Estee and Todd Sullivan	November 26, 2023	TBA
20	"A Very Fluffy Purstmas"	Derek Prout	Philippe Ivanusic-Vallee	Kirk Jorgensen, Alex Szewczuk and Tom Nesbitt	December 10, 2023	TBA
20	"New Year's Evil"	Derek Prout	Hugh Duffy	Kirk Jorgensen, Alex Szewczuk and Tom Nesbitt	December 10, 2023	TBA
21	"Starlight Starfright"	Derek Prout	Madeleine Dunohue	Steve Remen and Tom Nesbitt	February 25, 2024	TBA
21	"Let Sleepover Dogs Lie"	Derek Prout	Ashley Spires	Steve Remen and Tom Nesbitt	February 25, 2024	TBA
22	"Bell on a Binky"	Derek Prout	Miles Smith	Todd Sullivan and Kirk Jorgensen	March 3, 2024	TBA
22	"A Coo to Remember"	Derek Prout	Andrew Shenkman	Todd Sullivan and Kirk Jorgensen	March 3, 2024	TBA
23	"Night of the Coo"	Derek Prout	Philippa Ivanusic-Vallee	Alex Szewczuk and Steve Remen	March 10, 2024	TBA
23	"Cheese Chase"	Derek Prout	Andrew Shenkman	Alex Szewczuk and Steve Remen	March 10, 2024	TBA
24	"Doggy in a Box"	Derek Prout	Miles Smith	Elizabeth Estee and Todd Sullivan	March 17, 2024	TBA
24	"Chirpy's Champs"	Derek Prout	Madeleine Donohue	Elizabeth Estee and Todd Sullivan	March 17, 2024	TBA
25	"Pink Peril"	Derek Prout	Carolyn Hay and Hugh Duffy	Kirk Jorgensen and Alex Szewczuk	March 24, 2024	TBA
25	"Friends of a Feather"	Derek Prout	Miles Smith	Kirk Jorgensen and Alex Szewczuk	March 24, 2024	TBA
26	"Inventing Trouble"	Derek Prout	Andrew Shenkman	Steve Remen, Todd Sullivan and Ron Wilson	March 31, 2024	TBA
26	"Invasion of the Robo-Snatchers"	Derek Prout	Ashley Spires	Steve Remen, Todd Sullivan and Ron Wilson	March 31, 2024	TBA

== Broadcast ==
Agent Binky: Pets of the Universe premiered on Treehouse TV in Canada on September 7, 2019, along with Disney Junior Canada on August 28, 2023. The show currently airs every day at 12:40 PM and 7:30 PM, and some interstitial episodes air on the channel as well. The show also airs on Discovery Kids in Latin America, TF1 in France and Boomerang across Europe. In Singapore, it debuted on Channel 5 on June 15, 2020. In the United Kingdom, the series debuted on Tiny Pop on June 21, 2021. It also aired on SX3 in Catalonia and TvG2 in Galicia. In the United States, the series was released on Peacock on August 15, 2024.

In French Canada, the show premiered on ICI Radio-Canada Télé on September 19, 2020.
