= Zoo Diaries =

Canadian documentary TV series

- Narrated by: Vince Corazza; Ben Gordon
- Country of origin: Canada
- No. of episodes: 74

Production
- Executive producers: Gary Blye; Mark Shekter
- Running time: 30 minutes

Original release
- Network: Life Network Magic TV
- Release: 2000 – 2004

Zoo Diaries is a Canadian documentary television series airing on Magic TV And Life Network. The series documents the live of animals and people at a zoo with a record of breeding endangered species. 74 episodes have been produced since 2000 by DocuTainment Productions. The final episode aired in 2004.

Each episode opens with a brief description of the show's contents. Events in the life of three or four animals are shown, cutting between stories every couple of minutes. Each story focuses on an animal in an interesting situation, and the zoo person responsible for handling the situation. Some situations are resolved over a number of episodes, for example, developing and performing an animal show designed to startle the audience. Topics vary from birth to death.

The series is candid about the zoo employees' behavior and opinions.

It is filmed at the Toronto Zoo in Toronto, Ontario and narrated by Vince Corazza.

Episodes 1-37 are available on DVD. In Canada, the show currently airs on Disney Channel, Nat Geo Wild, and YTV.
