= National Geographic (Canadian TV channel) =

Canadian television channel

- Country: Canada
- Broadcast area: Nationwide
- Headquarters: Toronto, Ontario

Programming
- Picture format: 1080i HDTV (downscaled to letterboxed 480i for the SDTV feed)

Ownership
- Owner: Corus Entertainment (64%) (branding licensed from Disney Branded Television); National Geographic Channel (20% direct, 16% indirect)
- Sister channels: Nat Geo Wild; Disney Channel

History
- Launched: August 15, 2001; 25 years ago
- Former names: National Geographic Channel (2001–16)

Links
- Website: National Geographic Channel Canada

Availability

Streaming media
- StackTV: Internet Protocol television

National Geographic (formerly National Geographic Channel) is a Canadian English language television channel owned by Corus Entertainment. It is a licensed version of the eponymous American cable television channel. It features documentary and human interest programming that explores the natural world. The service, like its international counterparts, is based on National Geographic Magazine.

== Programming ==
Programming includes specials and theme weeks such as 'Pharaoh's Week' and 'Shark Week'. The programs broadcast revolve around the following topics: wildlife, history, science and technology, people and culture, and travel and adventure.

== History ==
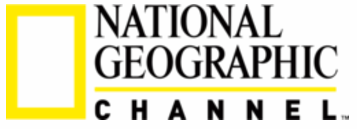
Original logo used from 2001 to 2004

In November 2000, Alliance Atlantis (on behalf of a corporation to be incorporated) was granted approval by the Canadian Radio-television and Telecommunications Commission (CRTC) to launch a national English-language Category 2 specialty television service called National Geographic Channel. It was described as a service that will "feature documentary programming in the areas of geography, world cultures, anthropology, remote exploration, natural conservation and geo-politics. Its programs will draw on pre-eminent resources, talent and expertise and use rare and spectacular images, riveting storytelling and innovative technology to bring the pages of the National Geographic Magazine to life."

The channel was launched on September 7, 2001, under the ownership of Alliance Atlantis and the U.S.-based National Geographic Channel.

Previous logo used from 2002 to 2016

On December 19, 2006, Alliance Atlantis launched a high definition simulcast of National Geographic Channel. It is available through all major TV providers in Canada.

On January 18, 2008, a joint venture between Canwest and Goldman Sachs Alternatives known as CW Media bought Alliance Atlantis and gained AAC's interest in National Geographic Channel. On October 27, 2010, ownership changed again as Shaw Communications gained control of National Geographic Channel as a result of its acquisition of Canwest and Goldman Sachs' interest in CW Media.

On April 1, 2016, National Geographic Channel's parent company Shaw Media was sold to Corus Entertainment. Months later, National Geographic Channel was simply renamed to just National Geographic.

== See also ==
- National Geographic Channel (UK)
