= Cheer Squad =

Canadian reality television series

- Genre: Reality
- Country of origin: Canada
- Original language: English
- No. of seasons: 1
- No. of episodes: 10

Production
- Executive producer: Claire Freeland
- Producer: Graeme Lynch
- Cinematography: Shane Geddes; Zachary Williams
- Running time: 42 minutes
- Production company: Good Human Productions

Original release
- Network: ABC Spark
- Release: August 22 – September 7, 2016

Cheer Squad is a Canadian reality television series that debuted on ABC Spark on July 6, 2016, and in the US on Freeform on August 22, 2016. It follows the Canadian cheer team the Great White Sharks as they work together on the road to world championships. As of 2018 there is only one season, and there will not be a second season.

== Cast ==
- Ashleigh Dodunski (25)
- Jenna Dodunski (25)
- Jordan Knox (Knoxy) (26)
- Daniela Uhlenbruck (Dani) (22)
- Laura Ashley (L.A.) (24)
- Sarah Schlotzhauer (Schlotzy)(19)
- Brittany Silveira (B-Silv) (19)
- Alicia Jantzi (Yahtzee) (21)
- Leah Smith (Smitty) (17)
- Erin Kotlar (Moe) (23)
- Emily Vesterfelt (Vesty) (16)
- Bethany Lewis (Beth) (26)
- Rebecca Webster (Becca) (26)
- Chelsea Matteson (15)
- Christina Zara (Zara) (16)
- Lindsay MacKenzie (Mack) (19)
- Lora Jordan (asst Coach)
- Mariah Vittoria Pimpao (Bella) (14)
- Jennifer Power (Power)(24)
- Lindsay Everson (Nubs) (16)
- Ashley Blayney-Hoffer (B.H.) (17)
- Kiana Horchover (Horch) (19)
- Haley Debruyne (Bruney) (18)
- Ali Moffatt (Coach)
- Anna (17)
- Ashley (Preddy) (20)

== Episodes ==
No.	Title	Original release date	Prod. code
1	"Building a New Dream Team"	July 6, 2016	101
Hot off the heels of the World Cheerleading Championships, The Great White Sharks must build a new dream team. Seasoned veterans and fresh faces face off in open tryouts as they attempt to earn a coveted spot. Ashleigh gets a driving lesson from her sister Jenna and roommate Knoxy.
2	"Standing Out and Fitting In"	July 13, 2016	102
With a new team roster, the Sharks head to the super elite Hot Shots skills camp in Miami. But the newly minted team is struggling to perform. Can they pull it together and prove they are worthy of the invite?
3	"Summer Heat"	July 20, 2016	103
It's the middle of the summer and the heat is on The Great White Sharks. By the end of the week one athlete will be removed from roster and placed on the alternates list. Coach Ali announces she will make her decision after the team performs together for the first time in front of thousands of people at a professional football game. Off the mat, Twins Ashleigh and Jenna reluctantly agree to a blind date.
4	"Showcase Showdown"	July 27, 2016	104
The Great White Sharks are about to reveal their routine to the world. Fans everywhere expect jaw-dropping stunts and perfectly executed moves as the team prepares to take the stage at Chomp Down – their first major event of the season. In attendance is Cheer's biggest social media mogul who will put out the routine moments after they finish. Will it be an achievement…or an embarrassment for Ali and her athletes? Amidst the stress Becca attempts a dramatic surprise for her boyfriend Brody. And Bruney experiences growing pains as she leaves home for university.
5	"Stage Fright"	August 3, 2016	105
The Sharks are about to compete in their first official competition of the season – Cheer For The Cure. With two undefeated seasons behind them they are the run away favorites. That is, until Ali's feud with her veterans hits a fever pitch and a shocking injury threatens to derail the team's performance. Off the mat, Nubs and Jenna look for romance at a local hockey game.
6	"Desperate Measures"	August 10, 2016	106
The Sharks return from a break and fight to prepare for their next big showcase – Love 2 Cheer. But, the departure of a key flyer means Coach Ali must make a plea to a former star to return to the team. And with their key position under threat, the Veterans take desperate measures to get their groove back. Off the mat, the bickering Twins agree to help Nubs prepare for her prom with mixed results.
7	"Texas Stars"	August 17, 2016	107
It's time for NCA in Dallas - arguably the single biggest cheer competition in the world. The Sharks are returning champions, but before they take the stage Ali must decide if her former star flyer is ready to perform. Off the mat the Twins challenge their ultra competitive roommate Knoxy to a dance off and Dani gets the surprise of her life when some unexpected visitors show up.
8	"Rock Bottom"	August 24, 2016	108
Tattoos, a donkey sanctuary and a radical new approach to coaching are all part of the last ditch effort by the Sharks to bounce back before their next big competition.
9	"Romance and Retribution"	August 31, 2016	109
The Sharks face an old rival at Nationals while Nubs finds new love on a blind date. When LA surprises her boyfriend Josh with an extravagant gift the gesture backfires.
10	"Three-peat?"	September 7, 2016	110
The Sharks are in Orlando chasing a third World Title. But, first Knoxy must face the music with her Mom while the Twins complete an Orlando bucket list. And then it all comes down to one final performance.
