= Discovery Familia =

American Spanish-language pay TV channel

- Broadcast area: United States & Latin America
- Headquarters: Miami, Florida

Programming
- Language: Spanish
- Picture format: 1080i HDTV (downscaled to letterboxed 480i for the SDTV feed)

Ownership
- Owner: Skydance Global Cable Media (Skydance)
- Sister channels: CNN en Español; Cinemáx; Discovery en Español; Discovery Family; Hogar de HGTV; HBO Latino; MTV Tres

History
- Launched: November 1, 2007; 19 years ago
- Replaced: Discovery Kids en Español; Discovery Viajar y Vivir (both 2005–07)

Availability

Streaming media
- Services: Hulu + Live TV, Sling TV, YouTube TV

Discovery Familia is an American Spanish-language family-oriented specialty television channel owned by Skydance. It launched on November 1, 2007, after Discovery Communications merged its pre-existing Spanish-language channels, Discovery Kids en Español and Discovery Viajar y Vivir (Travel & Living) into one channel space. Both networks launched together on June 30, 2005.

Programming for preschoolers airs from 6:00 a.m to 11:00 a.m Eastern Time, while the rest of the schedule is devoted to family-oriented programming dubbed from the American Discovery networks or natively in Spanish from its sister networks worldwide.

As of February 2015, approximately 5.8 million American households (or 5% of households with television) receive Discovery Familia.

== See also ==
- Discovery Kids (Latin America)
