= National Geographic Wild (Canada) =

- National Geographic Wild logo
- Country: Canada
- Broadcast area: Nationwide
- Headquarters: Toronto, Ontario

Programming
- Picture format: 1080i (HDTV); 480i (SDTV)

Ownership
- Owner: Corus Entertainment (64%) (branding licensed from Disney Branded Television); National Geographic Global Networks (20% direct, 16% indirect)
- Sister channels: National Geographic Disney Channel

History
- Launched: May 7, 2012; 14 years ago
- Replaced: Global Reality Channel
- Former names: Nat Geo Wild (2012-2019)

Links
- Website: National Geographic Wild Canada

National Geographic Wild is a Canadian English-language discretionary specialty channel owned by Corus Entertainment and National Geographic Global Networks. The channel airs programming devoted to wildlife, nature, and animals.

== History ==
In April 2010, Canwest (the majority owner and operator of the Canadian version of National Geographic Channel) had requested the Canadian Radio-television and Telecommunications Commission (CRTC) to add the U.S. cable network of the same name to the list of available foreign channels permitted to broadcast in Canada. Both High Fidelity HDTV (the owner of Oasis HD) and CTV Speciality Television Inc. (the major owner of the Canadian version of Animal Planet) sent letters to CRTC to oppose the request because they considered Nat Geo Wild to be competitive with Oasis HD and Animal Planet. Canwest was acquired by Shaw Communications later that year. The CRTC denied the application on February 15, 2011.

In October 2011, NGC Channel Inc. (a company owned by Shaw and National Geographic Channel in the U.S.) put forth its own application to the CRTC in order to launch a Canadian version of Nat Geo Wild. The licence was approved by the CRTC on April 13, 2012. Neither High Fidelity HDTV nor Bell Media voiced a concern about Nat Geo Wild competing with their services.

On April 30, 2012, Shaw released a statement that the Canadian version of Nat Geo Wild was scheduled to be launched on May 7, 2012. The channel was launched in standard and high definition. Bell Aliant Fibe TV is one of the provider not carried the channel.

On April 1, 2016, Shaw Media was sold to Corus Entertainment.

Nat Geo Wild was rebranded as National Geographic Wild in 2019.

== Logo ==
Logo used from 2012 to 2019

== Programming ==
=== Noted series ===
- Dr. Oakley, Yukon Vet
- Dogs with Jobs
- The Incredible Dr. Pol
- Totally Wild
- Zoo Diaries
- Snakes in the City (also known as Snake City)
