= Terror TV =

Canadian television channel

- Terror TV logo
- Country: Canada
- Broadcast area: National
- Headquarters: Montreal, Quebec

Ownership
- Owner: IO Média
- Sister channels: Frissons TV

History
- Launched: TBA

Terror TV is an upcoming Canadian English language specialty channel owned by IO Média. Terror TV will broadcast programming focusing on the horror genre. Programming is expected to include classic and modern feature films, movies-of-the-week, and television series. The channel is expected to launch in high definition, however, no details have emerged on whether the channel will launch in any other format, such as standard definition.

== History ==
On April 24, 2014, IO MEDIA issued a press release announcing that its English language television service, Terror TV, would be launching in high definition in fall 2014. However, since that time frame, the channel did not launch as planned, with its website subsequently listing several expected launch dates afterwards, such as 2015 and 2016, with neither coming to fruition.

Previous to the April 24th announcement of the channel's launch, the channel had been listed on the CRTC's List of Exempt Category B and Exempt Third-Language Services since 2013, a list identifying launched Category B television services without a CRTC-granted broadcasting licence due to a limited number of subscribers. However, information on whether the channel had been actually launched during this time has not been verified.

In tandem with the Terror TV launch, Sylvain Gagné, President of Callisto Television, was expected to launch a French language version of the channel, called Frissons TV. A Canadian Radio-television and Telecommunications Commission (CRTC) broadcasting licence was granted for Frissions TV in April 2014. Although initially expected to only be viable with Terror TV launched as well, Frissions TV was later launched in September 2017 after further research revealed the channel would be viable on its own without Terror TV. Upon the launch of Frissons TV, Gagné was quoted in an interview as saying, referring to Terror TV, “As for the English channel, we’re still hoping to launch it somewhere in 2018. At the time it’s not our main concern.”
