= Discovery Kids (United Kingdom and Ireland) =

- Broadcast area: United Kingdom, Ireland

Ownership
- Owner: Discovery Networks UK (Discovery Communications)

History
- Launched: 1 February 2000
- Replaced: Carlton Kids
- Closed: 28 February 2007
- Replaced by: Discovery Turbo

Discovery Kids was a UK and Ireland pay television channel targeted towards a child audience. Initially launched in February 2000 exclusively on ONdigital (later ITV Digital) alongside its timesharing service Discovery Wings, it was soon expanded to other platforms such as Sky Digital and Virgin Media. The channel was closed with Discovery Wings on 28 February 2007 to make way for Discovery Turbo, which took over both the daytime and evening slots.

== History ==
On 22 December 1999, it was announced that two new Discovery networks – Discovery Kids and Discovery Wings, would launch exclusively on ONdigital on 1 February 2000. Both channels would replace and take over the timesharing space occupied by Carlton Kids and Carlton World.

On 12 October 2001, it was announced that the main Discovery Channel would launch on ITV Digital on 17 October, with Discovery announcing that it would fully replace both Kids and Wings on that platform on 18 November. The channel continued on other digital platforms such as Sky Digital, and Virgin Media.

Discovery Kids (and Discovery Wings) closed down at midnight on 28 February 2007, to be replaced by Discovery Turbo the following day. Discovery Kids was replaced with an online broadband video service called Discovery Kids on Demand, not updated since the closure of the TV channel. Some of Discovery Kids' previous programmes like The Save-Ums!, Timeblazers and Mystery Hunters were later shown on DMAX during the mornings. It was owned by Discovery UK.
