= Nickelodeon (Canadian TV channel) =

Defunct Canadian television channel (2001–2025)

Nickelodeon Canada
- Final logo used from November 2, 2023 to September 1, 2025. (Note: The logo's wordmark had been in use from November 2, 2009 to September 1, 2025. Additionally, this variant was meant for use on white backgrounds; the main variant had a white wordmark in conjunction with a fully orange splat.)
- Country: Canada
- Broadcast area: Nationwide
- Headquarters: Toronto, Ontario

Programming
- Language: English
- Picture format: 1080i HDTV (downscaled to letterboxed 480i for the SDTV feed)

Ownership
- Owner: Corus Entertainment (branding licensed from Paramount Skydance)
- Parent: YTV Canada, Inc.
- Sister channels: YTV; Treehouse TV

History
- Launched: September 3, 2001; 25 years ago (as Discovery Kids); November 2, 2009; 17 years ago (as Nickelodeon)
- Closed: September 1, 2025; 14 months ago
- Replaced by: Paramount+ (most programming)
- Former names: Discovery Kids (2001–2009)

Links
- Website: Nick Canada (archived August 2025)

Nickelodeon was a Canadian English language discretionary specialty channel owned by YTV Canada, Inc., a subsidiary of Corus Entertainment, under a brand licensing agreement with the Paramount Media Networks division of Paramount Skydance (now Skydance Corporation). It was a localized version of the American cable network of the same name, broadcasting programs aimed at children and young teenagers.

The channel launched on September 3, 2001, as a Canadian version of Discovery Kids, under the joint ownership of Corus Entertainment and Discovery Communications. Like its American namesake, Discovery Kids aired nature, science, and technology-themed programming aimed at children ages four to eight. In September 2009, Corus announced that the channel would relaunch as a Canadian version of Nickelodeon under license from MTV Networks, which occurred on November 2, 2009.

Historically, YTV and Treehouse TV served as the main Canadian outlets for Nickelodeon and Nick Jr. programming. Until September 1, 2025, both channels continued to premiere new original series from the American network, since they (as basic cable channels) are more widely distributed than the digitally-distributed Nickelodeon channel.

Nickelodeon was one of two Paramount Skydance-branded channels owned by Corus, along with CMT. On July 10, 2025, it was announced that Nickelodeon, alongside ABC Spark, Disney Jr., Disney XD, and La Chaîne Disney, would close on September 1 due to financial pressure within Corus.

== History ==
=== As Discovery Kids (2001–2009) ===
Logo used as Discovery Kids (2001–2009)

In December 2000, Corus Entertainment, on behalf of an organization to be incorporated, was granted approval by the Canadian Radio-television and Telecommunications Commission (CRTC) to launch Discovery Kids, described as "a national English-language Category 2 specialty television service that offers children of all ages a fun, entertaining way to satisfy their natural curiosity with stimulating, imaginative programming that asks the questions of how? and why? and awakens the power of the mind."

The channel was launched on September 3, 2001, with the Earth Science for Children episode "All About Fossils" being the first program to air on the network. Discovery Communications purchased a minority stake in the service either prior to or shortly after the channel's launch.

=== As Nickelodeon (2009–2025) ===
Logo used from November 2, 2009 to September 1, 2025. Concurrently used with the 2023 logo from November 2, 2023 to September 1, 2025.

In September 2008, Corus Entertainment was given approval by the Canadian Radio-television and Telecommunications Commission (CRTC) to launch a specialty channel named "YTV OneWorld", described as featuring "programming from around the world targeting children and teenagers aged 6 to 17 and their families. The schedule would include programs devoted to entertainment, humour, travel, games and science and technology." In September 2009, Corus announced it had reached an agreement with MTV Networks, a subsidiary of Viacom, to launch Nickelodeon in Canada as a domestic channel.

The channel was relaunched as "Nickelodeon" on November 2, 2009, at 6 a.m. using the "YTV OneWorld" license. Jacob Two-Two was the first show broadcast under the Nickelodeon name, shortly after Discovery Kids' final broadcast of Aquateam. Because it was legally a distinct service, subscription television companies had to reach new agreements with Corus in order to carry Nickelodeon, as Discovery Kids operated under a different license. Earlier in April, Discovery announced that it would relaunch the American version of Discovery Kids in a joint venture with Hasbro, which would be known as the Hub Network before being rebranded as Discovery Family in 2014.

On April 9, 2013, Telus Optik TV launched Nickelodeon HD, a high-definition simulcast of the standard-definition feed. It was later launched on June 25, 2013, for Rogers Cable and added to Bell Fibe TV's service on October 25, 2013.

On September 22, 2015, Corus Entertainment announced the launch of Nickelodeon GO, an app that allowed viewers to watch the channel live, as well as stream shows from its American counterpart. The app was available for iOS and Android platforms, but required a subscription to Nickelodeon from a pay TV provider.

In June 2019, as part of the launch of Amazon Prime Video Channels in Canada, Corus launched a standalone subscription video on demand channel featuring Nickelodeon content, later branded as Nick+. On August 30, 2022, it was announced that Nick+ would be discontinued and replaced on September 1 by Teletoon+, which focuses on programming from Warner Bros. Animation and Cartoon Network.

==== Closure ====
On July 10, 2025, Corus announced that it would close Nickelodeon along with four of its Disney Branded Television-affiliated specialty channels (Disney Jr., Disney XD, La Chaîne Disney, and ABC Spark) on September 1. On August 18, Corus announced that they would no longer distribute Nickelodeon programming on both YTV and Treehouse, and that all Nickelodeon programming would be removed from both channels permanently on the same day the Nickelodeon channel shut down. Nickelodeon closed in Canada permanently at midnight on September 1, 2025, with the final show to air on the channel being the Zoo Diaries episode "Monkeys in Trouble" before it fades to a black screen with a statement "this channel is no longer available".

A number of Nickelodeon programming formerly aired on this channel along with YTV and Treehouse all remain available in Canada through the Paramount+ streaming service.

== Programming ==
Nickelodeon primarily aired a mix of both contemporary and older original programming seen on its American counterpart, with most of its programming aired on YTV and Treehouse TV. The channel also featured a commercial-free (ad-supported on the weekends), Nick Jr.-branded block of preschool programming during the daytime hours. In order to fulfil Canadian content guidelines, Nickelodeon also aired programming sourced from other Corus-owned networks.

== See also ==
- Nickelodeon (American counterpart)
- YTV
- Treehouse TV
- Nick Jr.
- Discovery Kids (U.S.)
- Discovery Kids (UK)
- Discovery Kids (Latin America)
