= La Chaîne Disney =

Defunct Canadian-French television channel (2015–2025)

- Final logo used from September 1, 2015 to September 1, 2025
- Country: Canada
- Broadcast area: Nationwide
- Network: Disney Channel
- Headquarters: Montreal, Quebec

Programming
- Language: French
- Picture format: 1080i HDTV (downscaled to letterboxed 480i for the SDTV feed)

Ownership
- Owner: Teletoon Canada, Inc. (Corus Entertainment) (branding licensed from Disney Branded Television)
- Sister channels: Disney Channel; Télétoon; Disney Jr.; Disney XD; ABC Spark

History
- Launched: September 1, 2015; 11 years ago
- Replaced: Télétoon Rétro
- Closed: September 1, 2025; 14 months ago

Links
- Website: La Chaîne Disney (archived July 2025)

La Chaîne Disney was a Canadian French-language specialty channel owned by Teletoon Canada, Inc., a subsidiary of Corus Entertainment under license from The Walt Disney Company, and launched on September 1, 2015, replacing Télétoon Rétro. It was a localized version of the American television network Disney Channel, broadcasting live-action and animated programming aimed at French-speaking children in Canada.

The launch of the network came alongside a licensing deal reached between Disney and Corus, who acquired Canadian rights to Disney Channel's programming library, and the announcement of a Canadian version of Disney Channel broadcasting in English that launched concurrently. Previous rightsholder DHX Media never operated any Disney Channel-branded services in English or French, and its only French-language Disney-branded property was a French-language Canadian version of the preschool children's channel Disney Junior.

== History ==
Before the channel's launch, French-language dubs of Disney Channel programs were broadcast by Radio-Canada and later Vrak.TV, which was co-owned with Family Channel. Vrak.TV was separated from Family with the acquisition of Astral Media by Bell Media; in an attempt to relieve concerns surrounding Bell's total market share in English-language television following the merger, Bell chose to divest Family Channel and its sister networks to DHX Media, which included Astral's French-language version of Disney Junior.

On April 16, 2015, Corus Entertainment announced that it had acquired long-term, Canadian multi-platform rights to Disney Channel's programming library; the cost and duration of the licensing deal were not disclosed. Alongside the licensing deal, Corus announced that it would launch a Canadian version of Disney Channel; the service consisted of linear television channels in English and French, along with TV Everywhere and video-on-demand services for digital platforms.

The French-language service, La Chaîne Disney, launched concurrently with its English-language counterpart on September 1, 2015. It replaced Télétoon Rétro in its previous channel allotments, operating under the same CRTC license.

In 2018, the channel was rebranded to match its English-language counterpart and slightly modified its logo.

=== Closure ===
On July 10, 2025, Corus announced that they would close La Chaîne Disney alongside a selection of children's channels (Nickelodeon, Disney XD, Disney Jr. and ABC Spark) at midnight on September 1, 2025, exactly ten years after La Chaîne Disney's launch. Despite the closure, Corus confirmed that it would continue to air Disney content on its other channels, with its English-language counterpart not affected. The last program to air on the channel before the closure was the French dub of 3 Amigonauts, with the episode "Glasses Half Fail/Burt's Biggest Boom"before it fades to a black screen with a statement This channel is no longer avaliable. This does not just leave the channel's English-language counterpart as the only Disney-related channel airing in Canada, but also Télétoon the only French-language children's channel owned by Corus.

== Programming ==
La Chaîne Disney's programming mainly consisted of French-language dubs of programs from Disney Channel. As there was no French-language version of Disney XD in Canada and Disney Junior's French-language channel closed when La Chaîne Disney launched, programs from both brands were also included as part of their respective programming blocks, Disney Junior sur la chaîne Disney and XD Zone (shown on air as Disney XD Zone). They also aired Disney Channel shows on blocks based on their respective themes.
