= ABC Spark =

Defunct Canadian television channel (2001–2025)

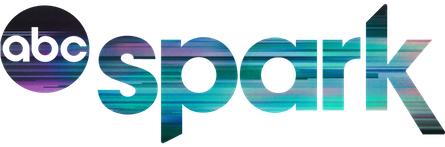
- Final logo used from 2012 to 2025
- Country: Canada
- Broadcast area: Nationwide
- Headquarters: Toronto, Ontario

Programming
- Language: English
- Picture format: 1080i HDTV (downscaled to letterboxed 480i for the SDTV feed)

Ownership
- Owner: Corus Entertainment (2001–2025); Alliance Atlantis (2001–2008); Canwest (2008–2010); Shaw Media (2010–2013)
- Sister channels: Disney Channel; La Chaîne Disney; Disney Jr.; Disney XD

History
- Launched: September 7, 2001; 25 years ago (as Scream); March 26, 2012; 14 years ago (as ABC Spark)
- Closed: September 1, 2025; 14 months ago
- Replaced by: Slice and W Network (programming)
- Former names: Scream (2001–2009); Dusk (2009–2012)

Links
- Website: ABC Spark (archived July 2025)

ABC Spark was a Canadian English-language discretionary specialty channel owned by Corus Entertainment. The channel launched on September 7, 2001, as Scream under the ownership of Corus Entertainment and Alliance Atlantis as a Category 2 service. During its early years, Scream broadcast horror, thriller, and suspense films along with some television series. After the acquisition of Alliance Atlantis by Canwest and Goldman Sachs, the channel was relaunched as Dusk in 2009, and abandoned horror programming in favor of paranormal- and suspense-themed programming to appeal to a wider audience. During its time as Dusk, it aired programming consisting of films, television dramas, reality television, and documentary-style television series from the thriller, suspense and supernatural genres.

Two years after Canwest was sold to Shaw Media, a sister company of Corus, the channel was relaunched on March 26, 2012, as ABC Spark which used the ABC branding and various programs were licensed from the ABC Family Worldwide subsidiary of Walt Disney Television, a subsidiary of The Walt Disney Company. This channel was based on the American television channel Freeform (previously known as ABC Family) and primarily consisted of programming aimed at teenagers, young adults, and preteens, as well as some sitcoms.

Amid the financial problems at Corus, the channel closed on September 1, 2025.

== History ==
=== As Scream ===
In November 2000, Corus, on behalf of a corporation to be incorporated, was approved by the Canadian Radio-television and Telecommunications Commission (CRTC) to launch a television channel called HorrorVision, which would be devoted primarily to the horror and thriller genres.

The channel was launched as Scream on September 7, 2001, as a joint venture between Corus Entertainment and Alliance Atlantis. Programming on Scream focused primarily on horror, thriller, suspense films and television series.

Logo used when under SCREAM brand (2001–2009)

On January 18, 2008, a joint venture between Canwest and Goldman Sachs Alternatives, known as CW Media, acquired 49% of Scream through its purchase of Alliance Atlantis' broadcasting assets, which were placed in a trust in August 2007.

=== As Dusk ===
Dusk logo used from 2009 to 2012

On September 9, 2009, Scream was relaunched as Dusk, with the channel abandoning horror and "gore" programming to focus more broadly on paranormal and suspense-driven programming (such as Supernatural and mainstream film premieres such as Along Came a Spider), to appeal to a broader viewer demographic such as women.

On October 27, 2010, another ownership change occurred when Shaw Communications gained a 49% stake in Scream as a result of its acquisition of Canwest and Goldman Sachs' interest in CW Media.

The last program aired on Dusk was the 1990 film Ghost, which was aired in a 24-hour marathon on March 25, 2012. After the final airing of the film, the network was relaunched as ABC Spark at 6:00 am ET on March 26.

=== As ABC Spark ===
==== Announcement and launch ====
The formation of ABC Spark was announced on October 26, 2011, as part of a program licensing agreement between Corus Entertainment and The Walt Disney Company. The network was branded as ABC Spark to avoid any confusion with Astral's Family Channel, which then held the rights to programming from ABC's sister network, Disney Channel. The channel's broadcast licence, then tentatively known as Harmony, was approved by the Canadian Radio-television and Telecommunications Commission (CRTC) in February 2012.

Selected ABC Family programs that would air on ABC Spark began airing in preview blocks in advance of the network's launch on January 26, 2012, through sister channels YTV, W Network, and CMT. The channel was owned by Corus (51%) and Shaw Media (49%) at launch on March 26. At the same time, on February 10, 2012, Dusk revealed through an announcement via its Twitter and Facebook accounts that it would shut down in March 2012. A statement later announced on the channel's website stated the channel was closing for strategic reasons to concentrate on "areas of expertise." Corus later indicated more specifically, through CRTC filings, that Dusk was rebranded to ABC Spark, so that Shaw Cable and Shaw Direct could carry the channel while complying with the CRTC's "3:1 ratio" policy (which limits the proportion of speciality channels carried from companies affiliated with a particular service provider).

Shortly after the channel's launch, the CRTC published notice of a pending application to transfer the ABC Spark licence to the numbered company which previously owned Dusk, which is 51% owned by Corus and 49% owned by Shaw Media. However, on March 4, 2013, Corus Entertainment announced that it would acquire Shaw Media's 49% ownership interest in ABC Spark, in a larger transaction that also had Corus acquiring Shaw's 50% interest in Historia and SériesPlus, while Corus would sell their 22.58% stake in Food Network. In total, Shaw would receive net proceeds of approximately $95 million in cash. The sale of the portion of ABC Spark closed in April 2013.

==== Expanded relationship with Disney and original programming ====
In April 2015, Corus Entertainment announced that it would expand its relationship with Disney, and Corus acquired the rights to Disney Channel's programming and related brands, which resulted in the launch of a Canadian version of Disney Channel, and relaunched versions of Disney Junior and Disney XD after DHX Media declined to renew their agreement to broadcast the programs in Disney's programming catalogue.

In October 2015, ABC Family announced plans to rebrand to "Freeform" in January 2016. ABC Spark did not adopt the Freeform name, but it did adopt the on-air imaging used by the American network.

Also in October 2015, ABC Spark announced its first original series titled Cheer Squad, a docureality series which premiered on July 5, 2016.

==== Closure ====
On July 10, 2025, Corus announced that they would close ABC Spark alongside a selection of children's channels (Nickelodeon, Disney XD, Disney Jr. and La Chaîne Disney) at midnight on September 1. Despite the closure, Corus confirmed that it would continue to air Disney content on its English-language counterpart, with some of ABC Spark's programming moving to Slice and W Network. The last program to air before its closure was the 2012 film This Is 40 before it fades to a black screen with a statement "this channel is no longer available."

== Programming ==
ABC Spark carried most of the original programs produced for Freeform in the U.S., including its own versions of the 31 Nights of Halloween and 25 Days of Christmas events, which broadcast special programming during the lead-up to their respective holidays. The channel's daily programming mainly consisted of acquired sitcoms and dramas, as well as syndicated programs from other Corus-owned channels.

In its early years, the channel was Canada's first horror television channel dedicated to the thriller, suspense and horror genres and was one of the most-watched new speciality channels. After its rebranding to ABC Spark, another attempt to launch a horror-based channel occurred five years later when Sylvain Gagné, owner of IO Média inc., launched Frissons TV in September 2017, with its English counterpart, Terror TV, also launching.
