= Disney XD (Canada) =

Canadian television channel (2015–2025)

- Logo used for the Corus Entertainment-owned channel
- Country: Canada
- Broadcast area: Nationwide
- Headquarters: Toronto, Ontario

Programming
- Language: English
- Picture format: 1080i HDTV (downscaled to letterboxed 480i for the SDTV feed)

Ownership
- Owner: Corus Entertainment (branding licensed from Disney Branded Television)
- Sister channels: Disney Channel; La Chaîne Disney; Disney Jr.; ABC Spark

History
- Launched: December 1, 2015; 10 years ago
- Closed: September 1, 2025; 14 months ago
- Replaced by: Disney Channel (programming)

Links
- Website: disneyxd.ca (archived August 2025)

Disney XD was a Canadian English-language discretionary specialty channel owned by Corus Entertainment which launched on December 1, 2015. It was a localized version of the American network of the same name, operated under licence from Disney Branded Television, a division of The Walt Disney Company which aired live-action and animated programming aimed at children and adolescents between the ages of 6 and 15.

== History ==
=== Original run (2011–2015) ===
The original Disney XD logo

A Canadian version of Disney XD was originally launched by Astral Media on June 1, 2011, as a spin-off of Family Channel, which had historically held rights to the programming of Disney Channel and its spin-off brands. After Bell Media acquired Astral in 2013, the company sold Disney XD along with its sister channels (Family Channel and the French and English versions of Disney Junior) to DHX Media. On April 16, 2015, Corus Entertainment announced that it had reached an agreement to acquire the Canadian rights to Disney Channel programming and brands.

Disney XD programming initially aired in a programming block on the Canadian version of Disney Channel, which Corus launched on September 1, 2015. The Disney XD-branded channel owned by DHX was renamed Family Chrgd on October 9, 2015, then again to WildBrainTV on March 1, 2022. It closed on October 22, 2025.

=== Relaunch and second closure (2015–2025) ===
The new Corus-owned Disney XD channel launched on December 1, 2015, as an exempt discretionary service. On September 1, 2017, the channel obtained a discretionary service licence from the CRTC. Through Corus Entertainment's acquisition of Shaw Media, Disney XD and its sister networks became co-owned with the former Shaw Media channels on April 1, 2016.

On December 1, 2022, Disney XD was added to StackTV, along with Disney Channel and Disney Junior.

On July 10, 2025, Corus Entertainment announced that they would close Disney XD alongside three other Disney-licensed channels (La Chaîne Disney, Disney Jr. and ABC Spark), as well as the completely unrelated Nickelodeon, at midnight permanently on September 1, due to pre-existing financial pressure occurring at the company, leaving the Polish version as the only remaining Disney XD-branded channel outside of the United States. Despite the closure, Corus announced that it would continue to air the channel's content on Disney Channel. The last program to air on the channel ahead of its midnight closure was the Milo Murphy's Law episode "Picture Day / Agee Ientee Diogee" before it fades to a black screen with a statement "this channel is no longer available".

== Statistics of the most broadcast programs ==
Broadcast data was collected from the official Disney XD website between July 3 and August 31, 2025. The most-broadcast series were Marvel's Avengers (2013), Marvel's Guardians of the Galaxy (2015) and Marvel's Spider-Man (2017). The least-aired show during the period was Rescue Heroes (1999).

Most of often at schedule:
1.	Marvel's Avengers (2013)	(600)
1.	Marvel's Guardians of the Galaxy (2015)	(600)
1.	Marvel's Spider-Man (2017)	(600)
4.	Mysticons	(204)
5.	Gravity Falls	(192)
6.	Sidekick	(162)
7.	3 Amigonauts	(144)
8.	Beyblade X	(120)
9.	Scaredy Squirrel	(118)
10.	Detentionaire	(84)

== See also ==
- List of Disney XD TV channels
