= Disney Jr. (Canada) =

Defunct Canadian children's television channel (2015–2025)

- Final logo used from 2024 to 2025
- Country: Canada
- Broadcast area: Nationwide
- Headquarters: Toronto, Ontario

Programming
- Language: English
- Picture format: 1080i HDTV (downscaled to letterboxed 480i for the SDTV feed)

Ownership
- Owner: Corus Entertainment (branding licensed from Disney Branded Television)
- Sister channels: La Chaîne Disney; Disney Channel; Disney XD; ABC Spark

History
- Launched: December 1, 2015; 10 years ago
- Closed: September 1, 2025; 14 months ago
- Replaced by: Disney Channel (programming)
- Former names: Disney Junior (2015–2024)

Links
- Website: Disney Jr. Canada (archived July 2025)

Disney Jr. was a Canadian English-language discretionary specialty channel owned by Corus Entertainment which launched on December 1, 2015. It was a localized version of the American cable network of the same name operated under licence from Disney Branded Television, a division of The Walt Disney Company which broadcast animated programming aimed at children and preschoolers.

== History ==
=== Original run (2011–2015) ===
From May 6, 2011 to September 18, 2015, DHX Media (now WildBrain) operated an English-language Disney Junior-branded channel in Canada as a multiplex of Family Channel (originally launched as Playhouse Disney on November 30, 2007). The channel had a French-language counterpart (launched on July 5, 2010 as Playhouse Disney Télé), operating under a separate licence.

In April 2015, Corus acquired Canadian rights to Disney Channel's programming and associated brands. After the announcement of the rights deal, Corus stated that it would launch several Disney branded channels in the future, after the launch of a Canadian version of Disney Channel.

=== Relaunch and second closure (2015–2025) ===
In August 2015, television provider VMedia stated on its website that Corus would launch Disney Junior and Disney XD channels on December 1, 2015. Upon its launch on September 1, 2015, Disney Channel aired a programming block featuring Disney Junior programs. DHX's Disney Junior services were rebranded as Family Jr. and Télémagino on September 18, 2015, and both channels shut down on October 23, 2025.

Corus's English-language Disney Junior channel officially launched on December 1, 2015 alongside their Disney XD channel. DHX's rights to broadcast Disney Junior programming expired on January 1, 2016.

On September 1, 2017, the channel obtained a discretionary service licence; it had been operating as an exempt channel before then.

There was no French-language counterpart launched, however, La Chaîne Disney offered the morning programming block Disney Junior sur La Chaîne Disney to carry the network's programming in the French language, until the network's permanent closure (along with Disney Jr. itself) on September 1, 2025.

On April 21, 2018, the network aired its first film, The Lion King (1994), and continued to air films (including Cars, Cars 2, and Finding Nemo) until early 2021.

In December 2022, Disney Junior was added to StackTV, along with Disney Channel and Disney XD.

On July 10, 2025, Corus Entertainment announced that they would close Disney Junior alongside three other Disney-licensed channels (La Chaîne Disney, Disney XD and ABC Spark), as well as the completely unrelated Nickelodeon, at midnight permanently on September 1, due to pre-existing financial pressure occurring at the company. Despite the closure, Corus confirmed that it would continue to air the channel's content on Disney Channel. The last show to air on the channel before its midnight closure was the Bluey minisodes "Tattoo Shop". Within the 24-hour channel shutdown on September 1, 2025, there were no major changes to the programming block itself.

== Logos ==
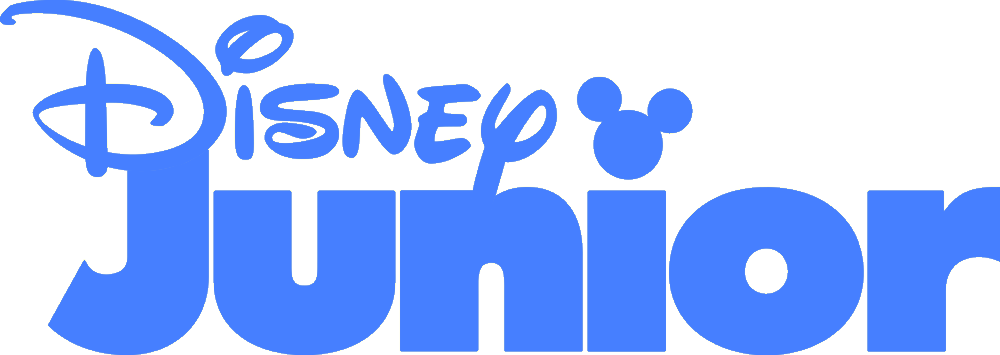
2017–2024

2024–2025

== Statistics of the most broadcast programs ==
Broadcast data was collected from the official Disney Junior website between January 1 and August 31, 2025 (end of channel). The most-broadcast series were Bluey (2018), Spidey and His Amazing Friends (2021) and locally-produced series Agent Binky: Pets of the Universe (2019). The least-aired show during the period was The Most Magnificent Thing (2019).

Most often at schedule:
1.	Bluey (2018)	(54 670 min)
2.	Marvels Spidey and His Amazing Friends (2021)	(36 600 min)
3.	Agent Binky: Pets of the Universe	(31 280 min)
4.	The ZhuZhus	(30 200 min)
5.	Trucktown	(25 100 min)
6.	Sofia the First	(19 350 min)
7.	Firebuds	(18 175 min)
7.	Puppy Dog Pals	(18 175 min)
9.	Mickey Mouse Funhouse	(17 575 min)
10.	SuperKitties	(17 425 min)
11.	Star Wars: Young Jedi Adventures	(16 596 min)
12.	Pupstruction	(13 850 min)
13.	Esme & Roy	(8 225 min)
14.	The Berenstain Bears	(6 075 min)
15.	Maggie and the Ferocious Beast	(6 050 min)
16.	Kindergarten: The Musical	(4 625 min)
17.	Robogobo	(3 325 min)
18.	Ariel	(3 125 min)
19.	Minnie's Bow-Toons	(2 944 min)
20.	Mike the Knight	(2 775 min)
