= Disney Channel (Canada) =

Canadian youth-targeted television channel

- Logo used since October 7, 2025
- Country: Canada
- Broadcast area: Nationwide
- Headquarters: Toronto, Ontario

Programming
- Language: English
- Picture format: HDTV 1080i; SDTV 480i (letterboxed)

Ownership
- Owner: Corus Entertainment (branding licensed from Disney Kids & Family)
- Sister channels: National Geographic

History
- Launched: September 1, 2015; 11 years ago

Links
- Website: Disney Channel Canada

Disney Channel is a Canadian English language discretionary specialty channel owned by Corus Entertainment under licence from The Walt Disney Company, which launched on September 1, 2015. It is a localized version of the American cable network of the same name, broadcasting live-action and animated programming aimed at children and teenagers between the ages of 9 and 18.

The channel launched as part of a licensing agreement between Corus Entertainment and the Disney–ABC Television Group (now known as Disney Entertainment Television), which replaced the previous program supply agreement between Disney and Family Channel (owned by WildBrain). Its launch marked the first time that a Disney Channel-branded television service operated in Canada.

== History ==
=== Background (1988–2015) ===
At the time of its launch in 1988, Family Channel held Canadian rights to Disney Channel's programming library. Although it never launched a separate Disney Channel-branded service in Canada during this agreement, its parent company DHX Media operated licensed Canadian versions of Disney Channel's spinoff brands, Disney XD and Disney Junior, as sister networks.

=== Launch and development (2015–2025) ===
On April 16, 2015, Corus Entertainment announced that it had reached an agreement with the Disney–ABC Television Group to acquire long-term, Canadian multi-platform rights to Disney Channel's programming library; the cost and duration of the licensing deal were not disclosed. Corus also announced that it would launch a Canadian version of Disney Channel on September 1, 2015; the service originally consisted of a linear television channel, along with TV Everywhere apps (Watch Disney Channel Canada), and video-on-demand services for television platforms. This marked Corus' second Disney/ABC-licensed service after ABC Spark, a localized version of ABC Family. At launch, Corus stated that Disney Channel was available in ten million households, with carriage across most major Canadian cable providers including Rogers, EastLink, and Access Communications, IPTV providers Bell MTS, Bell Fibe TV, Telus Optik TV, SaskTel, VMedia, and Execulink Telecom, and national satellite providers Bell Satellite TV and Shaw Direct. The channel replaced Teletoon Retro on some of these providers.

Corus also announced plans to relaunch Disney Channel's sister networks under its ownership, with the Corus-operated Disney Junior and Disney XD services launching on December 1, 2015. Before then, Disney Channel aired blocks featuring selected Disney Junior and XD programs. After the Disney XD and Disney Junior blocks ended on this channel, and for the 2015–16 television season, DHX consequently rebranded its Disney XD and Disney Junior networks as Family CHRGD (later WildBrainTV) and Family Jr. respectively, and began removing Disney programming from the two channels and Family; DHX Media's licensing agreement with Disney expired at the beginning of January 2016.

Disney Channel originally operated as an "exempted" Category B service, under new policies implemented in 2012, channels that would otherwise meet the definition of a Category B service were exempted from licensing by the Canadian Radio-television and Telecommunications Commission (CRTC), provided that they submit a formal application for licensing after they reach 200,000 subscribers. On September 1, 2017, the channel became a regularly licensed discretionary service.

In December 2022, Disney Channel, Disney Junior, and Disney XD were added to the streaming bundle StackTV, to accompany Teletoon (now Cartoon Network), Treehouse, and YTV.

=== Closure of sister networks (2025–present) ===
On July 10, 2025, Corus Entertainment announced that due to ongoing financial pressure occurring at the company, they would permanently close Disney Channel's sister networks, as well as ABC Spark and the Canadian version of Nickelodeon at midnight on September 1, 2025. Family Channel, which previously aired Disney Channel's programming, also closed in October 2025; Disney Channel was not affected by the closures.

== Programming ==
Disney Channel primarily airs animated programming, live-action series, and films from its American counterpart. It also airs programming from sister channels Disney XD and Disney Jr., interstitial programs such as Movie Surfers, which featured previews of upcoming films from The Walt Disney Company, and previews of new shows. In order to fulfill Canadian content requirements, Disney Channel also airs programming from other Corus-owned networks.

=== Programming blocks ===
==== Current ====
- Disney Jr. – a weekday morning programming block featuring programming from Disney Jr.. The block was originally discontinued after December 18, 2015, due to the launch of the Corus-operated Disney Junior channel. However, the two-day special preview of the Disney Junior series, Mickey and the Roadster Racers, aired on January 21, and January 22, 2017, at 9:00 a.m. EST across all English-language Disney channels in Canada as a simulcast and aired the preview on Disney Channel and Disney XD. The block returned in April 2018. After the Disney Jr. Canadian channel's closure in September 2025, the block remained on air.

==== Former ====
- Disney XD on Disney Channel – a Friday night/Saturday morning (originally weekend afternoon, then Thursday night) programming block featuring programs from Disney XD that were targeted at children ages 6 to 15. The block originally ended on November 29, 2015, due to the launch of the Corus-operated Disney XD channel. The Disney XD on Disney Channel block also aired occasionally on weekends to broadcast special episodes such as the Lab Rats: Elite Force premiere episode. The block returned on November 3, 2016, after an eleven-month hiatus and began airing on Thursday evenings from 8 p.m. to 10 p.m. EST/PST. The block was discontinued for a second time on May 25, 2017, but returned again on September 2, 2017, with Spider-Man, Milo Murphy's Law: Missing Milo, and Walk the Prank.
- Famalama DingDong – a four-day block with sister channels YTV and Teletoon (also owned by Corus). It aired the world premiere of the Disney Channel sitcom Stuck in the Middle along with the made-for-television film Invisible Sister and new episodes of Girl Meets World. It aired on Disney Channel from February 12, to February 15, 2016.

== Logos ==
2015–2017

2017–2019

2019–2025

2025–present
