= List of assets owned by CTVglobemedia =

CTVglobemedia Logo

This is a list of assets owned by CTVglobemedia upon its acquisition to Bell Canada in 2011.

In early 2000, Bell Canada Enterprises (BCE) acquired CTV Inc. and bought The Globe and Mail from Thomson Corporation. The resulting company was named Bell Globemedia Inc. In January 2007, after BCE reduced its ownership in the company, it was renamed CTVglobemedia. In 2011, the Canadian Radio-television and Telecommunications Commission approved Bell Canada's re-acquisition of CTVglobemedia for CA$1.3 billion. CTVglobemedia was subsequently renamed Bell Media on 1 April 2011.

== Television ==
=== CTV Inc. ===
==== Conventional television ====
===== CTV =====
- Calgary, Alberta - CFCN
- Edmonton, Alberta - CFRN
- Halifax, Nova Scotia - CJCH
- Kitchener, Ontario - CKCO
- Moncton, New Brunswick - CKCW
- Montreal, Quebec - CFCF
- North Bay, Ontario - CKNY
- Ottawa, Ontario - CJOH
- Prince Albert, Saskatchewan - CIPA
- Regina, Saskatchewan - CKCK
- Saint John, New Brunswick - CKLT
- Saskatoon, Saskatchewan - CFQC
- Sault Ste. Marie, Ontario - CHBX
- Sudbury, Ontario - CICI
- Sydney, Nova Scotia - CJCB
- Timmins, Ontario - CITO
- Toronto, Ontario - CFTO
- Vancouver, British Columbia - CIVT
- Winnipeg, Manitoba - CKY
- Yorkton, Saskatchewan - CICC

==== Speciality channels ====
- Business News Network (BNN)
- The Comedy Network
- CTV News Channel
- MTV
- OLN - 33% and managing partner (remainder sold to Rogers Communications in 2007)
- Travel + Escape (sold to Glassbox Television in 2010)

=== CTV Limited ===
On 22 June 2007, CHUM Limited merged with CTVglobemedia and was renamed CTV Limited. (Regulatory approval of this merger was made conditional on the sale of CHUM's five Citytv stations to Rogers Communications.)

==== Conventional television ====
City	Station	Notes
A
Barrie, ON	CKVR	
Pembroke and Ottawa, ON	CHRO	
London, ON	CFPL	
Wheatley and Windsor, ON	CHWI	
Wingham, ON	CKNX	closed down on 31 August 2009
Victoria, BC	CIVI	
Atlantic Canada	A Atlantic	licensed to CTV Inc.
Other
Calgary and Edmonton, AB	Access Alberta (CJAL/CIAN)	
Brandon, MB	CKX-TV	closed down on 2 October 2009

===== Specialty channels =====
- Bravo
- CP24
- E! (under licence from Comcast/NBCUniversal)
- PunchMuch
- MuchMusic
- MuchMore
- Space
- BookTelevision
- Comedy Gold
- MuchRetro
- MuchVibe
- MuchLoud
- MTV2
- Fashion Television
- Investigation Discovery (under licence from Discovery Communications)

==== CTV Specialty Television ====
CTV Specialty Television Inc. is jointly owned by Bell Media and ESPN, with 70% owned by Bell Media and 30% owned by ESPN (itself 80% owned by The Walt Disney Company and 20% owned by Hearst Corporation).

Any percentages below refer to the portion of each channel owned by CTV Specialty, with the balance in each case being owned by additional partners such as Discovery Communications.

- The Sports Network (TSN)
  - TSN2
- Réseau des sports (RDS)
  - RDS Info
  - RDS2
- Discovery Channel — 80% and managing partner
  - Animal Planet — 80% and managing partner
  - Discovery Science — 80% and managing partner
  - Discovery World — 80% and managing partner
- ESPN Classic
- NHL Network — 21.42% and managing partner
- Viewers Choice — 24.95%

== Radio ==
=== CHUM Radio ===
CHUM Radio was the wholly owned radio broadcasting division of CTVglobemedia (and remains a division of Bell Media). Through CHUM Radio, CTVglobemedia also owned CHUM Radio Sales.

CHUM Radio owned and operated these following stations:

City	Call Sign	Frequency	Branding/Format
Brockville	CJPT	FM 103.7	"Bob FM" adult hits
Brockville	CFJR	FM 104.9	"JR FM" adult contemporary
Calgary	CKCE	FM 101.5	"Kool FM" hot adult contemporary
Halifax	CJCH	FM 101.3	"The Bounce" Top 40
Halifax	CIOO	FM 100.1	"C100" hot adult contemporary
Kingston	CFLY	FM 98.3	"FLY-FM" hot adult contemporary
Kingston	CKLC	FM 98.9	modern rock
London	CHST	FM 102.3	"Bob FM" adult hits
Kawartha Lakes	CKLY	FM 91.9	"Bob FM" adult hits
Montreal	CKGM	AM 990	"The Team 990" sports
Ottawa	CFRA	AM 580	news/talk
Ottawa	CFGO	AM 1200	"The Team 1200" sports
Ottawa	CKKL	FM 93.9	"Bob FM" adult hits
Ottawa	CJMJ	FM 100.3	"Majic 100" adult contemporary
Peterborough	CKPT	FM 99.7	"Energy 99.7" hot adult contemporary
Peterborough	CKQM	FM 105.1	"Country 105"
Toronto	CHUM	AM 1050	"CP24 Radio 1050" all-news radio
Toronto	CHUM	FM 104.5	"104.5 CHUM-FM" hot adult contemporary
Toronto	CFXJ	FM 93.5	"The New Flow 935" Rhythmic Top 40
Vancouver	CKST	AM 1040	"The Team 1040" sports
Vancouver	CFTE	AM 1410	The Team 1410 sports
Vancouver	CFBT	FM 94.5	"The Beat" Top 40
Vancouver	CHQM	FM 103.5	"QMFM" adult contemporary
Victoria	CFAX	AM 1070	news/talk
Victoria	CHBE	FM 107.3	"Kool FM" Top 40
Waterloo	CKKW	FM 99.5	"KFUN 99.5" oldies
Waterloo	CFCA	FM 105.3	"Kool FM" hot adult contemporary
Windsor	CKWW	AM 580	"580 Memories" oldies
Windsor	CKLW	AM 800	news/talk
Windsor	CIMX	FM 88.7	"89X" modern rock
Windsor	CIDR	FM 93.9	"939 The River" adult album alternative
Winnipeg	CFRW	AM 1290	"Sports Radio 1290"
Winnipeg	CHIQ	FM 94.3	"FAB 94.3" classic hits
Winnipeg	CFWM	FM 99.9	"Bob FM" adult hits

== Print ==
- The Globe and Mail — sold to The Woodbridge Company in 2011

== Other assets ==
- Access Media Group (dissolved in 2008)
- Agincourt Productions Inc. — CTV's in-house production company
- Autohound (unknown equity interest)
- Canada's Olympic Broadcast Media Consortium (80%) — produces Canadian broadcasts of 2010 and 2012 Olympic Games
- CTV Music — music publishing
- Dome Productions (35% through CTV Specialty Television Inc, which owns 50% total) — production facilities
- Exploration Production Inc. and Exploration Distribution Inc. (56.06% owned by CTVglobemedia) — Discovery Channel Canada's in-house production and distribution companies
- Megawheels Technologies Inc. (4%)

== See also ==
- Lists of corporate assets
