= CJET-FM =

Radio station in Smiths Falls, Ontario

Coordinates: 45°4′50″N 76°5′52″W

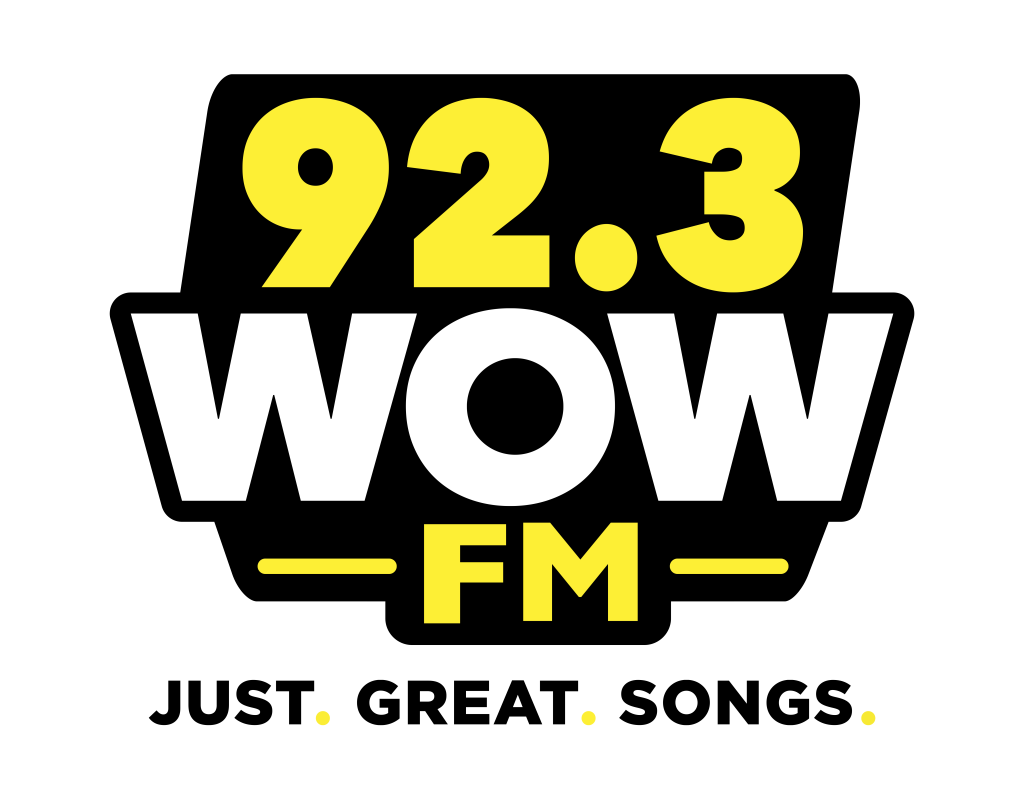
- Smiths Falls, Ontario; Canada
- Broadcast area: National Capital Region, Eastern Ontario, Western Quebec
- Frequency: 92.3 MHz
- Branding: 92.3 WOW FM

Programming
- Format: Classic hits

Ownership
- Owner: My Broadcasting Corporation

History
- First air date: October 22, 1955
- Former call signs: CFRL (1955); CJET (1955–2000); CKBY-FM (2020–2023)
- Former frequencies: 1070 kHz (AM) (1955–1958); 630 kHz (1958–2000)

Technical information
- Class: B
- ERP: 9,300 watts (17,000 watts peak) horizontal polarization only
- HAAT: 119.1 meters (391 ft)

Links
- Webcast: Listen Live on My Broadcasting Stream; Listen Live on iHeartRadio
- Website: lanarkleedstoday.ca

CJET-FM (92.3 MHz) is a commercial radio station licensed to Smiths Falls, Ontario, and serving the Ottawa Valley and National Capital Region. The station is owned by My Broadcasting Corporation. It broadcasts an classic hits format and is branded as 92.3 WOW FM.

CJET-FM has an effective radiated power (ERP) of 9,300 watts (17,000 watts maximum), horizontal polarization only. The transmitter is on Ontario Highway 15 near Line Road 7 in Beckwith, Ontario.

== History ==
The station was launched in 1955 by Rideau Broadcasting as CJET, on 1070 AM, and played a country format. Prior to signing on, the station would have been known as CFRL = "Rideau Lakes" it was changed to CJET when the station signed on. It began broadcasting in a daytime-only capacity On October 22, 1955. In 1958, the station's frequency changed to 630 AM.

In the early 1960s Rich Little was hired full-time as a disc jockey and talk show host. His afternoon-evening shift ran from 4 to 8 weekdays, and the show gave him the opportunity to use his impressions on the air.

In 1969, CJET-FM was launched on 101.1 FM as a stereo simulcast of the AM signal.

In 1984, the AM and FM stations were sold to Harvey Glatt's CHEZ-FM Inc., which was subsequently acquired by Rogers Communications in 1999. On March 21, 2000, the Canadian Radio-television and Telecommunications Commission (CRTC) approved Rogers' application to convert CJET from the AM band (630 kHz) to the FM band on 92.3 MHz. On October 14, 2001, CJET-FM began testing on 92.3 MHz and launched on October 27 as Country 92. CJET's 630 AM transmitter was later shut down. The station adopted an adult hits format as 92.3 Jack FM in 2004.

On December 3, 2020, CJET returned to country as Country 92.3, taking on the format and programming of CKBY-FM (both stations would also swap callsigns) after its flip to all-news radio as a simulcast of CIWW CityNews Ottawa. The two stations also swapped call letters.

Former logo as "Jack 92.3" used from 2023 to 2025

On October 26, 2023 at 1:00 p.m., the country format was reverted to CKBY-FM 101.1 (along with the callsign change) after Rogers decided to discontinue the all-news format in Ottawa. After the two frequencies simulcasted for several days, 92.3 would begin stunting on November 1 with Christmas music for the holiday season as Santa Radio Canada, sharing its branding with an internet radio stream promoted by Rogers under the same name. On December 27, 2023, the station returned to the Jack FM format as Jack 92.3, emphasizing the return by using the tagline "Smith Falls' newish radio station".

On November 22, 2024, Rogers Radio announced its intent to sell CJET-FM to My Broadcasting Corporation, pending CRTC approval. The application was approved by the CRTC on June 30, 2025. On August 1, 2025, the station flipped to classic hits as 92.3 Wow FM.

92.3 WOW FM logo used from August 1, 2025 until July 27, 2026

On July 27, 2026, My Broadcasting Corporation updated the 92.3 WOW FM logo with new slogan Just Great Songs retaining the classic hits format. On the same date, MBC rebranded all the My Broadcasting Corporation-owned oldies stations to WOW FM in the following locations: CFMP-FM Arnprior, CIYM-FM Brighton, CJWV-FM Peterborough and CKNC-FM Simcoe.
