= CKMO =

CKMO may refer to:

- CKMO (AM), a defunct radio station in Victoria, British Columbia,
- CKMO-FM, an active radio station in Orangeville, Ontario.
