= CJML-FM =

Radio station in Milton, Ontario, Canada

Coordinates: 43°30′12.4″N 79°51′22.5″W

- Milton, Ontario; Canada
- Frequency: 101.3 MHz
- Branding: 101.3 IndieFM

Programming
- Format: Adult album alternative

Ownership
- Owner: Local Radio Lab Inc.
- Sister stations: CKMO-FM

History
- First air date: August 2, 2017
- Call sign meaning: "Milton"

Technical information
- ERP: 0.228 minimum kW, 0.486 kW average 0.950 kWs peak
- HAAT: −8.2 meters (−27 ft)

Links
- Website: miltonnow.ca

CJML-FM (101.3 FM, "101.3 IndieFM") is a radio station in Milton, Ontario. Owned by Local Radio Lab, the station broadcasts an adult album alternative format.

== History ==
The CRTC first received an application from My Broadcasting Corporation (MBC) on May 27, 2015. On August 2, 2017, the station was finally able to sign on the air branded as 101.3 myFM. It also receives co-channel interference east of Milton due to CJSA-FM in Toronto also broadcasting on the same frequency and also CKOT-FM in Tillsonburg. On April 8, 2020, the CRTC approved an application by MBC to increase the average effective radiated power (ERP) from 228 to 480 watts (maximum ERP from 950 to 2,000 watts) and by changing the orientation of its directional antenna. CJML-FM will remain at 101.3 MHz.

Logo as FM 101 Milton used from 2021-2025

On June 25, 2021, the CRTC approved the sale of CJML, as well as its sister stations CIMA-FM/Alliston and CKMO-FM/Orangeville, by MBC to Local Radio Lab, a new company led by former Haliburton Broadcasting Group owner Christopher Grossman.

On December 1, 2025, the station flipped to an adult album alternative format as 101.3 IndieFM; the new format is modeled after sister station CIND-FM Indie88 in Toronto, and incorporates some of the station's hosts and programs alongside existing local programming.
