= CKSG-FM =

Radio station in Cobourg, Ontario

Coordinates: 44°04′14″N 78°08′35″W

- Cobourg, Ontario; Canada
- Broadcast area: Northumberland County; Peterborough County
- Frequency: 93.3 MHz (FM)
- Branding: 93.3 myFM

Programming
- Format: Adult contemporary

Ownership
- Owner: My Broadcasting Corporation
- Sister stations: CHUC-FM, CJWV-FM, CJMB-FM

History
- First air date: 2002

Technical information
- Class: B
- ERP: 4.1 kWs average 15.5 kWs peak
- HAAT: 222.5 meters (730 ft)

Links
- Webcast: Listen live
- Website: www.gonorthumberland.net

CKSG-FM is a Canadian radio station being licensed to Cobourg, Ontario serving the Northumberland and Peterborough region broadcasting at 93.3 FM. The station broadcasts an adult contemporary format branded as 93.3 myFM.

== History ==
On August 1, 2001, 572047 Ontario Limited received approval from the Canadian Radio-television and Telecommunications Commission (CRTC) to operate a new English-language FM radio station at Cobourg, Ontario.

The station was officially launched by Pineridge Broadcasting with a hot adult contemporary/top 40 format under the brand name Star 93.3 on July 10, 2002 at 9:33 am. Pineridge Broadcasting which, at the time, also owned CHUC-FM and CJWV-FM.

On September 20, 2006, Pineridge Broadcasting Inc. received CRTC approval to increase CKSG-FM's average effective radiated power (ERP) from 2,070 watts to 4,000 watts and increasing the antenna height.

On September 1, 2015, My Broadcasting Corporation purchased Pineridge Broadcasting Inc. On March 7, 2016, at Noon, the station rebranded as 93.3 myFM, and flipped to an adult contemporary format.
