= CKNC =

CKNC may refer to:

- CKNC-FM, a radio station in Simcoe, Ontario
- CKNC-TV, a defunct television station in Sudbury, Ontario,
- the original call sign of CJBC, a radio station in Toronto, Ontario.
