= The Team (radio network) =

Canadian sports radio network

The TEAM
- Country: Canada

Programming
- Format: Sports radio

Ownership
- Owner: CHUM Limited

History
- Launch date: May 2001
- Closed: August 2002

Coverage
- Availability: Various major Canadian cities (AM radio)
- Affiliates: See list

The Team (corporately styled as The TEAM) was a Canadian sports radio network, which broadcast from 2001 to 2002. It was owned and operated by CHUM Limited, based on the existing format of their Ottawa station The Team 1200, and incorporated virtually all of the company's AM radio stations across Canada. It was dissolved as a national network in 2002 amid poor ratings, although a few of its former stations retained the sports format and Team branding as standalone entities.

== History ==
The Team logo, branded for 1050 Toronto

The network was launched on May 7, 2001, but struggled to build an audience in many cities. In Toronto, for example, the network had to compete against Telemedia's The Fan 590, and found that much of its potential audience had already built a strong sense of loyalty to the more established station. The switch of 1050 CHUM, the network's flagship station, away from its popular former oldies format was also controversial.

The network aired both original programming — its marquee Canadian sportscaster was Jim Van Horne, while other programs were hosted by Paul Romanuk, Mike Richards and Gene Valaitis — and syndicated sports programming from the United States, such as The Jim Rome Show.

In August 2002, after just over a year on the air, CHUM pulled the plug and most of the network's stations reverted to their old pre-Team formats. However, the sports format and the Team branding were retained in Ottawa, where it had already been the station's established format before the network was launched, and in Montreal and Vancouver, where it was also successful in the ratings. Most of these stations, and one in Edmonton which had licensed the brand name but which at the time was owned by a different company, continued to use the Team branding as of early 2011, but were no longer considered a network.

All of the stations, save the former Calgary affiliate, are now owned by CHUM's successor Bell Media. In 2011, some of these stations were rebranded and integrated into a new TSN Radio network, starting with Toronto's radio station CHUM on April 13, 2011; the Winnipeg and Montreal stations were added shortly thereafter, with Ottawa and Edmonton stations added in 2013. The two Bell Media-owned sports radio stations in Vancouver, while sharing some programming with the TSN Radio stations, retained the Team branding until September 8, 2014, when they were both re-branded as TSN Radio.

== The Team stations ==
=== CHUM-owned ===
Broadcast area	Station	Previous format	Subsequent format	Current format
Halifax, Nova Scotia	CJCH	Talk radio	Oldies with some talk programming	Relocated to FM as CJCH-FM 101.3 The Bounce; now 101.3 Virgin Radio (CHR/Top 40)
Montreal, Quebec	CKGM	Oldies	Retained The Team	Later renamed TSN Radio 990; now TSN Radio 690
Ottawa, Ontario	CFGO	Adopted The Team in 1998	Retained The Team	Later renamed TSN Radio 1200
Kingston, Ontario	CKLC	Adult contemporary	Adult standards	Relocated to FM as CKLC-FM 98.9 The Drive (Alternative rock) later Pure Country 99; now Kingston's New Country 98.9
Peterborough, Ontario	CKPT	Oldies	Adult standards as 1420 Memories	Relocated to FM as CKPT-FM Energy 99.3 later Move 99.7 (AC); now Pete 99.3 (Adult Hits)
Toronto, Ontario	CHUM	Oldies as 1050 CHUM	Oldies as 1050 CHUM	reverted to a sports format on April 13, 2011, as TSN Radio 1050
Kitchener-Waterloo, Ontario	CKKW	Oldies	Oldies as Oldies 1090	Relocated to FM as CKKW-FM KFUN 99.5 later Bounce 99.5 (Adult Hits); now 99.5 Virgin Radio (CHR/Top 40)
Winnipeg, Manitoba	CFRW	Oldies	Oldies	returned to all-sports as TSN Radio 1290; shut down in June 2023
Vancouver, British Columbia	CKST	Oldies	Retained The Team	Later renamed TSN Radio 1040 in September 2014; shut down in June 2023
Vancouver, British Columbia	CFTE	Talk (note: CFTE adopted "The Team" branding in November 2009)	Retained The Team	Later renamed TSN Radio 1410 in September 2014; shut down in June 2023

=== Affiliates ===
CFAC in Calgary and CFRN in Edmonton were also affiliates of the Team, although the stations were not CHUM-owned — CFAC was owned by Rogers and CFRN by Standard Broadcasting. After the Team network folded, both stations retained the sports format, although CFAC adopted the name The Fan 960, as Rogers had by this time acquired Toronto's Fan 590. CFRN, now also owned by Bell Media Radio, continued to use the Team branding until joining TSN Radio in 2013; it was shut down in June 2023.

== Later ==
Vancouver's CFTE, a sister station to CKST, also converted to the Team branding in 2009, airing a similar but distinct schedule of sports programming from its sister. Meanwhile, CHUM's Winnipeg AM station CFRW returned to an all-sports format on September 27, 2010, at the time, the station was known as "Sports Radio 1290" (without any Team branding). The station was subsequently relaunched as TSN Radio 1290 on October 5, 2011.

Following the 2007 acquisition of CHUM by CTVglobemedia, majority owner of TSN, there had been occasional reports about CTV potentially using the remaining Team stations and/or the 1050 frequency in Toronto to launch a new sports radio station in Toronto or full radio network using TSN content and personalities. Plans on launching a new TSN Radio brand began in January 2011 and Toronto's radio station CHUM (1050 AM) became the first station under the new TSN Radio network as TSN Radio 1050 on April 13, 2011. CTVglobemedia was purchased by Bell Canada Enterprises in early 2011 and became Bell Media; the company completed its purchase of Astral Media, owner of The Team's former Edmonton affiliate CFRN, in July 2013.
