= CKOT =

CKOT may refer to:

- CKOT-FM, a radio station (101.3 FM) licensed to Tillsonburg, Ontario, Canada
- CKOT (AM), a radio station (1510 AM) licensed to Tillsonburg, Ontario, Canada which operated from 1955 until it left the air in 2013.
