= CIYM-FM =

Radio station in Brighton, Ontario

Coordinates: 44.0410°N 77.7352°W

- Brighton, Ontario; Canada
- Broadcast area: Belleville-Quinte West
- Frequency: 100.9 MHz
- Branding: 100.9 WOW FM

Programming
- Format: Classic hits

Ownership
- Owner: My Broadcasting Corporation

History
- First air date: 2009

Technical information
- Class: A
- ERP: 650 watts average 1,450 watts peak
- HAAT: 147 metres (482 ft)

Links
- Webcast: Listen Live
- Website: brightontoday.ca

CIYM-FM is a Canadian radio station that broadcasts a classic hits format at 100.9 FM in Brighton, Ontario.

Owned by My Broadcasting Corporation, the station was authorized on May 15, 2009. It began broadcasting later in the same year originally with an adult contemporary format branded as 100.9 myFM.

On May 20, 2016, The station switched to oldies branded as Oldies 100.9.

Oldies 100.9 logo used from 2016-2026

On July 27, 2026, My Broadcasting Corporation dropped the Oldies 100.9 branding and rebranded the station as 100.9 WOW FM. MBC also rebranded all other oldies stations to WOW FM in the following locations: CJWV-FM Peterborough, CFMP-FM Arnprior and CKNC-FM Simcoe.
