= CKZM-FM =

Radio station in St. Thomas, Ontario

Coordinates: 42.779261°N 81.183364°W

- St. Thomas, Ontario; Canada
- Frequency: 94.1 MHz
- Branding: 94.1 myFM

Programming
- Language: English
- Format: Adult contemporary

Ownership
- Owner: My Broadcasting Corporation

History
- Founded: October 12, 2010
- First air date: May 20, 2011

Technical information
- Class: A
- ERP: 1.37 kWs average 4.37 kWs peak
- HAAT: 46.5 metres (153 ft)

Links
- Website: stthomastoday.ca

CKZM-FM is a radio station which broadcasts at 94.1 MHz on the FM dial in St. Thomas, Ontario, Canada. It airs an adult contemporary format branded as 94.1 myFM.

It is owned by My Broadcasting Corporation, it was licensed by the CRTC on October 12, 2010.

MBC is a corporation controlled by Jon Pole and Andrew Dickson.

The Station began operations on May 20, 2011 at 12:00 PM.
