= Move Radio =

Canadian radio network

- Type: Radio network
- Country: Canada
- Headquarters: Toronto, Ontario, Canada

Programming
- Format: Adult contemporary

Ownership
- Owner: Bell Media Radio (Bell Media)

History
- Founded: by Bell Media
- Launch date: December 27, 2020

Links
- Website: iheartradio.ca/move

Move Radio is a brand of adult contemporary radio stations heard across Canada. The network was launched on December 27, 2020, by Bell Media. The launch of the network involved a re-branding of eleven radio stations across Canada, five in Ontario, four in British Columbia, one in Nova Scotia and one in New Brunswick. The network currently broadcasts on four stations nationwide.

The launch of this network also involved the flipping of CJMG-FM's Top 40/CHR format to AC, as well as the CHR format of CIBX-FM to hot AC. All stations adopted the slogan Today's Best Variety, which is similar to other stations that use AC and hot AC formats, and have since then dropped their former brandings, including two stations with the "EZ Rock" brand.

During November and December, "Move" plays all-Christmas music.

== Programming ==
From the day of the launch, all stations would run jockless until January 4, 2021, with local staff returning on that day, including each station's local morning show hosts. On weekdays from 9:00 a.m. to 5:00 p.m. beginning on January 4, 2021, all stations would air 60 minutes of commercial-free music every hour. On weekends, these stations would air a variety of local programming, along with the syndicated American Top 40.

On weekdays from 10:00 a.m. to 2:00 p.m., most Move stations would be voice-tracked from their local markets, whereas those in Ottawa, Halifax, Fredericton, Peterborough and St. Catharines would be hosted by CHUM-FM's Ashley Greco. As a result, former midday host of Ottawa's station, Katharine Dines, moved into the afternoon drive slot. Trinette Atkinson, former afternoon drive host of Kingston's Pure Country station, has also moved into the afternoon drive slot of the city's "Move" station from 2:00 p.m. to 7:00 p.m.

== Stations ==
Current Move Radio stations
Call sign	Frequency	City	Province	Former branding
CIOO-FM	100.1 FM	Halifax	Nova Scotia	C100
CJMJ-FM	100.3 FM	Ottawa	Ontario	Majic
CHQM-FM	103.5 FM	Vancouver	British Columbia	QMFM
CIBX-FM	106.9 FM	Fredericton	New Brunswick	Capital FM

=== Former stations ===
Former Move Radio stations
Call sign	Frequency	City	Province	Previous branding	Current branding
CJMG-FM	97.1 FM	Penticton	British Columbia	Sun FM	Go FM
CFLY-FM	98.3 FM	Kingston	Ontario	Fly FM	Fly FM
CHRX-FM	98.5 FM	Fort St. John	British Columbia	Sun FM	Go FM
CKPT-FM	99.7 FM	Peterborough	Ontario	Energy	Pete
CILK-FM	101.5 FM	Kelowna	British Columbia	Silk FM	Go FM
CFJR-FM	104.9 FM	Brockville	Ontario	JRFM	MyFM
CHRE-FM	105.7 FM	St. Catharines	Ontario	EZ Rock	Dream
