= CHLK-FM =

Radio station in Perth, Ontario

Coordinates: 44°54′34″N 76°16′51″W

- Perth, Ontario; Canada
- Broadcast area: Rideau Lakes Region
- Frequency: 88.1 MHz
- Branding: 88.1 myFM

Programming
- Format: Adult contemporary/ community

Ownership
- Owner: My Broadcasting Corporation

History
- First air date: August 10, 2007
- Call sign meaning: "Lake", former brand, or Lanark County, area served

Technical information
- Class: A
- ERP: maximum 5,400 watts
- HAAT: 91.5 metres (300 ft)

Links
- Website: 88.1 myFM

CHLK-FM, branded as 88.1 myFM, is a Canadian radio station offering an adult contemporary format with a focus on local/regional news programming broadcasting at 88.1 FM in Perth, Ontario. The station was founded by Norm Wright and Brian Perkin in 2007. The station is located at 43 Wilson Street West in the town of Perth, while the antenna is at the top of a Bell Mobility cell tower located at the edge of town on Sproule Road off Lanark Road 511, approximately 1 kilometre (0.62 miles) north of Dufferin Street (Highway 7).

The station was licensed by the Canadian Radio-television and Telecommunications Commission on March 14, 2006, and began its first official broadcast day on August 10, 2007, at 6:00am as Lake 88.1. On December 13, 2010, the station received approval from the CRTC to increase the average effective radiated power (ERP) from 700 to 2,800 watts (maximum ERP from 1,350 to 5,400 watts with an average height of antenna above average terrain of 91.5 metres). Lake 88.1 increased its signal strength at 12:10pm on April 12, 2011. In 2014, Norm Wright retired and sold his shares to partner Brian Perkin and his wife Jennifer Perkin.

CHLK-FM receives interference from WSLZ on 88.1 FM out of Cape Vincent, New York, in the Westport and areas north of Kingston.

On February 26, 2021, Brian Perkin (Perth FM Radio Inc.), the owner of CHLK-FM sold the station to My Broadcasting Corporation (MBC) and was approved by the CRTC on March 12, 2021.

Previous logo as Lake 88.1 2007 (?)-2024

On January 29, 2024, CHLK-FM dropped its longtime Lake 88.1 branding and rebranded the station as 88.1 myFM retaining the adult contemporary format.
