= CJGM-FM =

Radio station in Gananoque

Coordinates: 44.32364°N 76.16339°W

- Gananoque, Ontario; Canada
- Broadcast area: Thousand Islands, Kingston
- Frequency: 99.9 MHz
- Branding: 99.9 myFM

Programming
- Format: Adult contemporary

Ownership
- Owner: My Broadcasting Corporation

History
- First air date: July 29, 2011

Technical information
- Class: B1
- ERP: 1,490 watts average (4,470 peak)
- HAAT: 122.6 metres (402 ft)

Links
- Website: gananoquenow.ca

CJGM-FM (99.9 MHz) is a commercial radio station in Gananoque, Ontario, Canada. This is the first commercial radio station in Gananoque and it serves the Thousand Islands and parts of Kingston. The station is branded as 99.9 myFM, and features an adult contemporary format. It is owned by My Broadcasting Corporation, with radio studios in The Pump House on Kate Street.

== History ==
The station received Canadian Radio-television and Telecommunications Commission (CRTC) approval on June 23, 2010. MBC initially wanted to offer a blend of country, gold/oldies and adult contemporary music for the new station.

On July 13, 2011, CJGM-FM started on-air tests. It began airing 5,000 songs in a row on July 29. The station officially signed on the air on September 12. The branding remains 99.9 myFM.

== Notes ==
The station serves Gananoque and parts of the Kingston market, although the station is limited in Brockville, where United Christian Broadcaster, who owns CKJJ-FM Belleville, Ontario operates a low-power 50 watt rebroadcasting transmitter on the same frequency (99.9 MHz). CJGM-FM only serves Gananoque and should not be included in the Brockville market.
