= CHCD-FM =

Adult contemporary radio station in Simcoe, Ontario

Coordinates: 42°44′48″N 80°19′06″W

- Simcoe, Ontario; Canada
- Broadcast area: Norfolk County
- Frequency: 98.9 MHz
- Branding: 98.9 myFM

Programming
- Format: Adult Contemporary

Ownership
- Owner: My Broadcasting Corporation
- Sister stations: CKNC-FM

History
- First air date: 1956
- Former call signs: CFRS (1956–1974); CHNR (1974–1997)
- Former frequencies: 1560 kHz (AM) (1956–1974); 1600 kHz (1974–1997); 106.7 MHz (1997–2004)

Technical information
- Class: B
- ERP: 14,370 watts
- HAAT: 150 metres (490 ft)

Links
- Webcast: Listen Live
- Website: norfolktoday.ca

CHCD-FM is a Canadian radio station, broadcasting at 98.9 FM in Simcoe, Ontario, Canada. The station airs an adult contemporary format branded as 98.9 myFM.

== History ==
The station was originally launched in 1956 as AM 1560 CFRS, a 250-watt daytimer owned by Simcoe Broadcasting. In 1974, the station moved to AM 1600, and adopted the callsign CHNR. The following year, the station was acquired by Redmond Broadcasting. In 1997, the station moved to FM 106.7 and adopted its current callsign; in 2004, the station moved to its current frequency (98.9 FM) to improve signal reception in the area. After CHCD-FM's move to 98.9 MHz, the station became "CD98.9". In 2005, CHCD was denied to add a rebroadcaster at 93.1 FM in Haldimand County, Ontario (Nelles Corners).

In 2012, the CRTC approved the change to the ownership and effective control of Radiocorp Ltd. from a control exercised by James MacLeod to a control jointly exercised by Andrew Dickson and Jon Pole (My Broadcasting Corporation). Radiocorp Ltd. (CHCD Radio) was licensee of CHCD-FM. In 2013, CHCD-FM changed its branding to 98.9 myFM.
