= WLYK =

- Cape Vincent, New York; United States
- Broadcast area: Kingston, Ontario, Canada
- Frequency: 102.7 MHz (FM)
- Branding: 102.7 Wow FM

Programming
- Format: Classic hits
- Affiliations: Kingston Frontenacs

Ownership
- Owner: Border International Broadcasting, Inc.
- Operator: 1234567 Corporation
- Sister stations: CFLY-FM, CKLC-FM

History
- First air date: January 23, 1989 (as WKGG)
- Former call signs: WKGG (1989–1997); WBDR (1997–2006); WXKK (2006); WBDR (2006–2008)
- Call sign meaning: Sounds like "lake"

Technical information
- Licensing authority: FCC
- Facility ID: 8567
- Class: A
- ERP: 6,000 watts
- HAAT: 100 meters (330 ft)
- Transmitter coordinates: 44°6′58″N 76°20′21″W

Links
- Public license information: Public file; LMS
- Webcast: Listen Live
- Website: kingstondaily.ca

WLYK (102.7 FM; "102.7 Wow FM") is a radio station licensed to Cape Vincent, New York. Owned by Border International Broadcasting and operated by 1234567 Corporation, a company owned by the co-founders of Canadian broadcaster My Broadcasting Corporation, it primarily broadcasts a classic hits format that targets the larger neighboring Canadian market of Kingston, Ontario. It is a member of Nielsen BDS' Canadian Border Stations Airplay panel.

WLYK has an effective radiated power (ERP) of 3,000 watts. The transmitter is on Route 6 at Stone Quarry Road in Cape Vincent, near the St. Lawrence River and Lake Ontario.

== History ==
=== AC and country ===
On January 23, 1989, the station signed on as WKGG. It simulcast the adult contemporary format heard on 103.1 WTOJ in Watertown, but with commercials aimed at listeners in Kingston. In late 1993, the station went silent.

In 1997, Garry MC Colman returned the station to the air. Its call sign was WBDR and it aired a contemporary hit radio (CHR) format as The Border. In late 1997, 102.7 started simulcasting on 106.7 to better serve Watertown. After the split of the "Border" simulcast in August 2006, it flipped to country after Kingston station CFMK-FM changed formats to adult hits, with 106.7 continuing the "Border" format. It began calling itself KIX-FM, using the call letters WKXX.

=== The Lake and Kiss ===
In December 2007, the station began stunting with all-Christmas music. This lasted until January 2, 2008, when the station switched to adult standards. The "KIX-FM" country format moved to CKXC-FM at the same time.

On February 26, 2008, WBDR changed its call sign to WLYK. In September 2012, WLYK flipped back to adult contemporary, maintaining its prior branding as The Lake.

On September 12, 2013, WLYK flipped back to CHR branded as Kiss 102.7, adopting the "Kiss" branding used by Rogers Media's CHR outlets.

=== Lake FM, Wow FM ===
On February 28, 2023, ahead of a proposed ownership change, WLYK dropped the CHR format and began stunting as "102.7 The Pole", featuring rock, hip hop, and pop music played in strip clubs. The stunt attracted the attention of a strip club in Kingston, which was bombarded with calls from listeners suggesting that they partner with the station. On March 17, 2023, the station relaunched as 102.7 Lake FM; it was positioned as a gold-based adult contemporary format featuring hit music from the 1970s, 1980s, and 1990s.

On July 24, 2024, WLYK flipped to classic hits as 102.7 Wow FM, adding market veterans Big G & Matty (who were formerly heard on CKXC-FM from 2004 to 2020) as its morning show and the syndicated Throwback Nation in evenings. The flip removed a degree of redundancy with future hot AC sister station CFLY-FM, which My Broadcasting Corporation (a sister to the station's current operator) was acquiring from Bell Media. In August 2024, it was announced that the station would become the new radio home of the Kingston Frontenacs of the Ontario Hockey League beginning in the 2024–25 season. In 2025, Big G & Matty moved to new sister station CKLC-FM, and were replaced by the syndicated Joey & Lauren.

== Ownership and management ==
As of October 28, 2011, ownership of Border International Broadcasting was divided between four shareholders: U.S. citizens John Clancy and David Mance (34% each), Rogers Broadcasting (20%), and Craig Harris (12%). Harris also resides in the U.S. but currently lists his citizenship as Canadian. (Note: This may have been a typo as Harris had indicated U.S. citizenship on past ownership reports.) As a U.S.-licensed station, WLYK operates under the jurisdiction of the Federal Communications Commission (FCC) and not the Canadian Radio-television and Telecommunications Commission (CRTC), meaning that it is not officially subject to regulations such as Canadian content rules.

In 2004, 20% of Border International Broadcasting was acquired by a Kingston-based numbered company. The same company also secured a local marketing agreement to operate the station, which led to WLYK sharing operations with Kingston stations CIKR-FM and (later) CKXC-FM. In late November 2008, Rogers Broadcasting announced it would acquire the remainder of K-Rock 105.7 Inc., owners of CIKR and CKXC, of which it already owned 25%, pending CRTC approval; the transaction was completed the following May. Following the transaction, WLYK's website was not updated to follow the standard Rogers radio station template and referred to its operator as simply "The Radio Group"; however it did continue to feature the logos of CIKR and CKXC, and continued to list the same studio address as the Rogers stations.

Rogers ultimately also acquired the Kingston company's interest in the station in February 2011. WLYK's website was subsequently updated to indicate Rogers Radio's management of the station.

In December 2022, Jon Pole and Andrew Dickson—the co-founders of My Broadcasting Corporation—reached an agreement to acquire Border International Broadcasting for $325,000. While awaiting FCC approval for the purchase, Pole and Dickson's 1234567 Corporation replaced Rogers as WLYK's operator on February 28, 2023.
