= CFJR-FM =

Radio station in Brockville, Ontario, Canada

Coordinates: 44.604956°N 75.716127°W

- Brockville, Ontario; Canada
- Broadcast area: Brockville
- Frequency: 104.9 MHz
- Branding: 104.9 myFM

Programming
- Format: Adult contemporary

Ownership
- Owner: My Broadcasting Corporation
- Sister stations: CJPT-FM

History
- First air date: 1926
- Former call signs: CFLC (1926–1943); CFBR (1943–1946); CFJM (1946–1950)
- Former frequencies: 1010 kHz (AM) (1926–1930); 930 kHz (1930–1941); 1450 kHz (1941–1985); 830 kHz (1985–2003)
- Call sign meaning: Jack Radford (former owner)

Technical information
- Class: B1
- ERP: 7,700 watts
- HAAT: 78.8 metres (259 ft)

Links
- Webcast: Listen Live
- Website: brockvilledaily.ca

CFJR-FM is a Canadian radio station broadcasting at 104.9 FM in Brockville, Ontario. The station, owned by My Broadcasting Corporation, airs an adult contemporary format branded as 104.9 myFM.

== History ==
The station was launched in 1926 as CFLC at 1010 kHz in Prescott. The station was operated by The Radio Association of Prescott (W.H. Plumb, A.G. Halliday, A.C. Casselman, P.J. McAndrews, L.F. Knight, H.M. Perkins, W.A. Cornell, J.E. White and D.S. Carlisle). The call letters stand for: "Canada's Finest Little Community". In the 1940s, Jack Whitby's Eastern Ontario Broadcasting Co. Ltd. purchased CFLC and moved the studios to the Fulford Building on Courthouse Avenue, near King Street in Brockville. In addition to being owner, Jack Whitby was also manager. In 1943, the call sign changed to CFBR (for Brockville). In 1946, it changed to CFJM (for Jack Murray) until it changed to its current call sign, CFJR (for Jack Radford), in 1950 where it has remained since. The station also had gone through different ownerships over the years.

The station changed frequencies to 930 in the early 1930s, until March 29, 1941, when it moved to 1450 kHz and moved one last time on the AM band to 830 kHz on September 19, 1985, before it moved to its current FM 104.9 MHz frequency on July 14, 2003.

In 1959, CFJR's news department hired a 21-year-old college dropout, Peter Jennings. This was Jennings debut in journalism. Many of his stories, including his coverage of a local train wreck, were picked up by the CBC and, in March 1961, he moved on to CJOH-TV, then a new television station in Ottawa.

Bruce Wylie, the morning show co-host, is the longest-tenured active talent in Bell Media Radio celebrating 50 years at CFJR on April 7, 2021. Today, it is also the only AC station owned by Bell Media that originated on the AM dial. It is also Bell Media's only AC station not broadcasting at 100,000 watts like its sister AC stations, CHQM-FM in Vancouver or CJMJ-FM in Ottawa.

Former "JR FM" logo until 2020

On December 27, 2020, as part of a mass format reorganization by Bell Media, CFJR rebranded as Move 104.9. While the station would run jockless for the first week of the format, on-air staff would return on January 4, 2021.

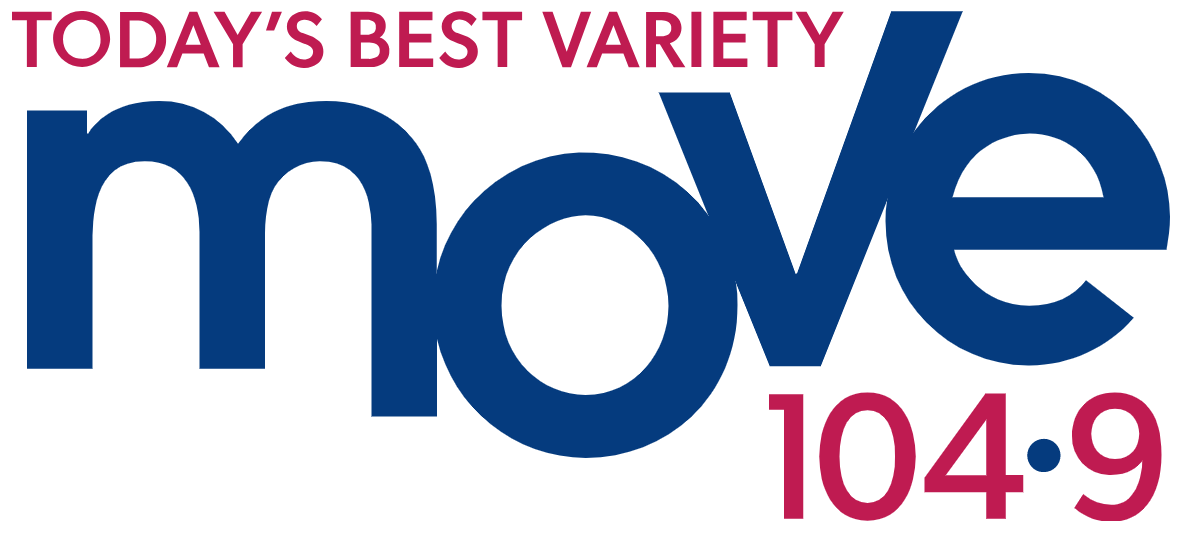
Former "Move Radio" logo until 2025

On February 8, 2024, Bell announced a restructuring that included the sale of 45 of its 103 radio stations to seven buyers, subject to approval by the CRTC, including the sale of CFJR to My Broadcasting Corporation (MBC). The sale was approved on February 26, 2025, after which MBC rebranded CFJR under its myFM branding on March 24, 2025.

== Notes ==
On December 13, 1984, the CRTC approved a number of applications for a number of AM radio stations across Ontario including CFJR 1450 Brockville to increase their nighttime power from 250 watts to 1,000 watts.
