= CHUC-FM =

Radio station in Cobourg, Ontario

Coordinates: 44°04′14″N 78°08′35″W

- Cobourg, Ontario; Canada
- Broadcast area: Northumberland County; Peterborough County
- Frequency: 107.9 MHz
- Branding: Classic Rock 107.9

Programming
- Format: Classic rock

Ownership
- Owner: My Broadcasting Corporation
- Sister stations: CKSG-FM

History
- First air date: August 27, 1957
- Former frequencies: 1500 kHz (AM) (1957–1963); 1450 kHz (1963–2006)

Technical information
- Licensing authority: CRTC
- Class: B
- ERP: 6,300 watts (20,000 watts peak)
- HAAT: 215.5 metres (707 ft)

Links
- Webcast: Listen Live
- Website: classicrock1079.ca

CHUC-FM is a Canadian radio station broadcasting at 107.9 FM in Cobourg, Ontario, Canada. The station airs a classic rock format branded as Classic Rock 107.9. It is owned by My Broadcasting Corporation.

== History ==
On August 27, 1957, the station first signed on the air. It originally broadcast at 1500 kHz on the AM band. In 1963, CHUC moved to 1450 kHz. CHUC had a middle of the road format of popular adult music, news and talk.

In 2005, the Canadian Radio-Television and Telecommunications Commission approved an FM conversion for the station. It moved to its current frequency in 2006, airing an oldies/classic hits format. CHUC's branding after the move to FM was 107.9 The Breeze with the slogan "The Greatest Classic Hits of All Time."

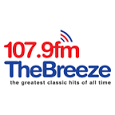

The AM signal remained in operation, rebroadcasting the FM station's programming, until November 7, 2007. The AM transmitter signed off with the song What a Wonderful World by Louis Armstrong after airing a special farewell message.

The ownership of CHUC changed hands from Pineridge Broadcasting Inc. to My Broadcasting Corporation on September 1, 2015. Also in 2015, CHUC dropped its adult contemporary/classic hits format and flipped to classic rock branded as Classic Rock 107.9.
