= CJPT-FM =

Radio station in Brockville, Ontario

Coordinates: 44°23′58″N 75°58′20″W

- Brockville, Ontario; Canada
- Broadcast area: Eastern Ontario
- Frequency: 103.7 MHz
- Branding: 103.7 Giant FM

Programming
- Format: Classic rock

Ownership
- Owner: My Broadcasting Corporation
- Sister stations: CFJR-FM

History
- First air date: 1987
- Former call signs: CHXL-FM (1988–2003)
- Call sign meaning: The Point (former branding)

Technical information
- Class: C1
- ERP: 53 kW average 100 kW peak
- HAAT: 144 metres (472 ft)

Links
- Webcast: Listen Live
- Website: 103.7 Giant FM

CJPT-FM is a radio station broadcasting at 103.7 FM in Brockville, Ontario, Canada. The station, owned by My Broadcasting Corporation, airs a classic rock format branded as 103.7 Giant FM.

== History ==
After the station was previously denied a license to operate a new FM radio station at Brockville in 1986, the station was originally licensed by the CRTC in 1987 to Eastern Broadcasting, the owner of CFJR. Eastern sold both stations to St. Lawrence Broadcasting before the FM station was launched. St. Lawrence launched the FM station in mid-1988 at 103.7 MHz with the call sign CHXL-FM with a classic rock format branded as XL-103.7.

In September 1995, the station rebranded as The River retaining the classic rock format.

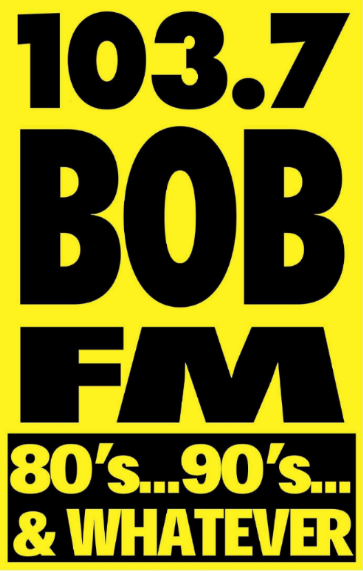
Former "Bob FM" logo until 2021

In 1996, both Brockville stations, as well as sister stations CKLC and CFLY in Kingston, were sold to CHUM Limited. On January 1, 2001, CHUM changed CHXL's call sign and format, adopted the current CJPT calls and began airing a hot adult contemporary format as 103.7 The Point. On July 14, 2003, CJPT flipped to adult hits and rebranded as 103.7 Bob FM.

CHUM was acquired by CTVglobemedia in 2007, and since CTVglobemedia's 2011 breakup, now owned by Bell Media.

As part of a mass format reorganization by Bell Media, on May 18, 2021, CJPT adopted the Bounce branding.

On February 8, 2024, Bell announced a restructuring that included the sale of 45 of its 103 radio stations to seven buyers, subject to approval by the CRTC, including the sale of CJPT to My Broadcasting Corporation (MBC).

The sale to My Broadcasting Corporation was approved by the CRTC on February 26, 2025. On March 24, 2025, CJPT flipped to classic rock as 103.7 Giant FM (a brand modeled after Welland sister station CIXL-FM).
