= CKMO-FM =

Radio station in Orangeville, Ontario

- Orangeville, Ontario; Canada
- Frequency: 101.5 MHz
- Branding: 101.5 IndieFM

Programming
- Format: Adult album alternative

Ownership
- Owner: Local Radio Lab Inc.

History
- First air date: November 6, 2014 (testing); February 17, 2015 (regular programming)
- Call sign meaning: "myFM Orangeville" (original branding)

Technical information
- Class: A
- ERP: 338 watts average 625 watts peak
- HAAT: 55.1 metres (181 ft)
- Transmitter coordinates: 43°56′59″N 80°07′38″W

Links
- Website: orangevilletoday.ca

CKMO-FM (101.5 FM, "101.5 IndieFM") is a radio station licensed to Orangeville, Ontario. Owned by Local Radio Lab, it broadcasts an adult album alternative format. Its studios are located on Mill Street in downtown Orangeville.

CKMO-FM is the only Orangeville-based station to specifically target Orangeville; the town's only other licensed radio station, CIDC-FM, is marketed towards the entirety of the Greater Toronto Area.

== History ==
My Broadcasting previously submitted an application for the station in 2012 at the same frequency and parameters, but the application was soon withdrawn. The station was approved to operate a new FM radio station at Orangeville, Ontario on July 18, 2014.

On November 6, 2014 at 11:12 am, CKMO-FM began on air testing with Christmas music on 101.5 MHz. In late December 2014, 101.5 FM switched from Christmas music to air 10,000 songs in a row.

On the morning of February 17, 2015, CKMO-FM launched its regular programming as 101.5 myFM, followed by a ribbon-cutting ceremony at noon with Mayor Jeremy Williams, Councillor Nick Garisto, and CKMO-FM General Manager Gail James.

Logo as FM 101 Orangeville used from 2021-2025

On June 25, 2021, the CRTC approved the sale of CKMO and its sister stations CIMA-FM/Alliston and CJML-FM/Milton to Local Radio Lab, a new company owned by former Haliburton Broadcasting Group owner Christopher Grossman. The station was later rebranded as simply FM 101.

On December 1, 2025, the station flipped to an adult album alternative format as 101.5 IndieFM; the new format is modeled after sister station CIND-FM Indie88 in Toronto, and incorporates some of the station's hosts and programs alongside existing local programming.

=== Historical use of CKMO call sign ===
From 1928 to 1955, the call letters CKMO were used at a pioneer radio station in Vancouver, British Columbia. On February 1, 1992, CKOC in Hamilton, Ontario dropped its historical call letters and adopted CKMO. However, after a few months the Hamilton station changed owners, and the CKOC call sign was restored. In 1993, CKMO became available for a radio station in Victoria, British Columbia, until 2012.
