= CKNC-FM =

Oldies/classic hits radio station in Simcoe, Ontario

Coordinates: 42°44′48″N 80°19′06″W

- Simcoe, Ontario; Canada
- Broadcast area: Norfolk County; Oxford County
- Frequency: 99.7 MHz (FM)
- Branding: 99.7 WOW FM

Programming
- Format: Classic hits

Ownership
- Owner: My Broadcasting Corporation
- Sister stations: CHCD-FM

History
- First air date: September 1, 2017

Technical information
- Licensing authority: CRTC
- Class: B1
- ERP: 9,667 watts
- HAAT: 26 metres (85 ft)

Links
- Webcast: Listen Live
- Website: www.norfolktoday.ca

CKNC-FM is a radio station in Simcoe, Ontario, broadcasting on 99.7 MHz with a classic hits format branded as 99.7 WOW FM. The station is owned by My Broadcasting Corporation, who first applied to operate a second station in Simcoe on June 9, 2017. The CRTC approved the application, and CKNC signed on the air on September 1, 2017, as Oldies 99.7 with the first song being The Rolling Stones' hit "Start Me Up".

Oldies 99.7 logo used from 2017-2026

On July 27, 2026, My Broadcasting Corporation dropped the Oldies 99.7 branding and rebranded the station as 99.7 WOW FM. MBC also rebranded all other oldies stations to WOW FM in the following locations: CIYM-FM Brighton, CJWV-FM Peterborough and CFMP-FM Arnprior.

== Notes ==
The CKNC callsign was used at a television station in Sudbury, Ontario from 1971 until 2002. CKNC was also the original callsign, in the 1920s and 1930s, of a radio station in Toronto that now uses the callsign CJBC.
