= CIYN-FM =

Radio station in Kincardine, Ontario

Coordinates: 44°10′32″N 81°37′11″W

- Kincardine, Ontario; Canada
- Broadcast area: Kincardine, Goderich, Port Elgin
- Frequency: 95.5 MHz
- Branding: Shoreline Classics

Programming
- Format: Classic rock

Ownership
- Owner: Lakeside Radio Broadcasting Corp.

History
- First air date: February 27, 2006

Technical information
- Class: A
- ERP: 5.66 kW vertical polarization only
- HAAT: 38.7 metres (127 ft)

Links
- Website: shorelineclassicsfm.com

CIYN-FM is a classic rock radio station in Kincardine, Ontario, broadcasting on 95.5 FM.

== History ==
The station was launched as The Coast FM on February 27, 2006, by 2079966 Ontario Ltd., 70.1% owned by local businessmen Brian Cooper and Danny McCarthy, and 29.9% owned by the Haliburton Broadcasting Group.

On February 17, 2009, the station applied to the CRTC to add a transmitter in Port Elgin operating at 90.9 MHz and was denied on May 13, 2009. The station reapplied to add a transmitter in Port Elgin on January 15, 2010, which received approval on March 12, 2010. The new Port Elgin transmitter would operate on the frequency 90.9 MHz. Also in February 2009, the station's owners announced a tentative deal to sell the station to My Broadcasting Corporation, which received approval on May 13, 2009.

On January 4, 2010, CIYN was officially relaunched as myFM.

On September 21, 2020, CIYN changed to Oldies 95.5, 90.9 and 99.7.

On December 22, 2020, My Broadcasting Corporation signed an agreement to sell CIYN Kincardine and its 2 transmitters CIYN-FM-1 in Goderich and CIYN-FM-2 in Port Elgin to Lakeside Radio Broadcasting Corporation. The CRTC held a hearing on May 27, 2021, to consider the sale and it received approval on June 30, 2021.

On September 1, 2021, Lakeside Radio dropped CIYN's oldies/classic hits format to a classic rock format branded as Shoreline Classics.

== Rebroadcasters ==
Rebroadcasters of CIYN-FM
City of licence	Identifier	Frequency	Power	Class	RECNet	CRTC Decision
Goderich	CIYN-FM-1	99.7 FM	750 watts	A	Query	2008-68
Port Elgin	CIYN-FM-2	90.9 FM	3,100 watts	A	Query	

== Previous logos ==
CIYN logo as myFM 2010-2020
