= CKXM-FM =

Radio station in Exeter, Ontario

Coordinates: 43°21′50″N 81°35′09″W

- Exeter, Ontario; Canada
- Frequency: 90.5 MHz
- Branding: 90.5 myFM

Programming
- Format: Adult contemporary

Ownership
- Owner: My Broadcasting Corporation

History
- First air date: August 31, 2009

Technical information
- Class: A
- ERP: 1.33 kW average 2.95 kW peak
- HAAT: 77.5 metres (254 ft)

Links
- Website: exetertoday.ca

CKXM-FM is a radio station that broadcasts an adult contemporary format on the frequency at 90.5 FM in Exeter, Ontario branded as 90.5 myFM.

Owned by My Broadcasting Corporation, the station was licensed on August 4, 2008.

In 2009, the station used Christmas music for on-air testing and signed on August 31, 2009.
