= CIMY-FM =

Radio station in Pembroke, Ontario

Coordinates: 45°47′21″N 77°11′03″W

- Pembroke, Ontario; Canada
- Frequency: 104.9 MHz
- Branding: 104.9 myFM

Programming
- Format: Adult Contemporary

Ownership
- Owner: My Broadcasting Corporation

History
- First air date: 2005
- Call sign meaning: "My"

Technical information
- ERP: 17,900 watts (34,000 maximum)
- HAAT: 83.9 metres (275 ft)

Links
- Website: pembroketoday.ca

CIMY-FM (104.9 MHz) is a commercial radio station in Pembroke, Ontario. Owned by My Broadcasting Corporation, it airs an adult contemporary format branded as 104.9 myFM. The radio studios and offices are on Julien Street.

CIMY has an effective radiated power (ERP) of 17,900 watts (34,000 maximum). The transmitter is on Round Lake Road in Pembroke, near the Trans-Canada Highway (Ontario Highway 17).

== History ==
The station was licensed by the Canadian Radio-television and Telecommunications Commission (CRTC) in 2005.

On November 2, 2010, My Broadcasting applied to change the authorized contours by increasing the average effective radiated power (ERP). This application was approved on January 13, 2011.
