= CKKL-FM =

Radio station in Ottawa

- Ottawa, Ontario; Canada
- Broadcast area: National Capital Region
- Frequency: 93.9 MHz
- Branding: Pure Country 94

Programming
- Language: English
- Format: Country
- Affiliations: Premiere Networks

Ownership
- Owner: Bell Media; (Bell Media Ottawa Radio Partnership)
- Sister stations: CFGO, CFRA, CJMJ-FM, CJOH-DT, CHRO-TV

History
- First air date: May 3, 1947
- Former call signs: CFRA-FM (1947–1961); CFMO (1961–1992)
- Call sign meaning: Former "Kool" branding

Technical information
- Class: C1
- ERP: 95,000 watts
- HAAT: 321.6 meters (1,055 ft)

Links
- Website: www.purecountry.ca/ottawa

45°25′39.1″N 75°41′28.2″W

CKKL-FM (93.9 MHz) is a commercial radio station in Ottawa, Ontario. Owned by Bell Media, it broadcasts a country format branded as "Pure Country 94". CKKL's radio studios and offices are located in the Bell Media Building on George Street in Downtown Ottawa's ByWard Market.

CKKL-FM has an effective radiated power (ERP) of 95,000 watts. The transmitter is in Camp Fortune, Quebec, within Gatineau Park.

== History ==
=== CFRA-FM ===
Frank Ryan originally launched the station on May 3, 1947 as CFRA-FM. At first it largely simulcast the programming of its sister station CFRA 560 AM (now on 580 kHz). In 1959, CFRA-FM began airing some separate programming.

In 1961, Ryan sought approval to increase power from 860 watts to 146,000 watts via a new tower site at Camp Fortune. The Ryan Tower (named after Frank Ryan) would become the area's main radio and television transmission site.

=== CFMO-FM ===
In 1961, the simulcast with CFRA ended. The FM station began a format of beautiful music with some classical music at night. The station adopted the call sign CFMO-FM to give it a separate identity from CFRA. The call letters stood for FM Ottawa. Both CFRA and CFMO were subsequently acquired by CHUM Limited in 1968.

The station manager at the time was veteran broadcaster Gord Atkinson, well known to Ottawa listeners. The music director was Ray Eckford. Announcers included: John Cavill and Bryan Williams (mornings) as well as Jim Bristow and Dick Richards (whose real name was Richard "Dick" Gasparini, originally with CKWW and CKCY-FM) in the evenings. Core artists heard on CFMO-FM were orchestras conducted by Percy Faith, Henry Mancini and Mantovani, as well as vocalists such as Frank Sinatra, Barbra Streisand and The Carpenters.

=== Kool-FM ===
As the 1990s began, CFMO began playing more soft vocal music and fewer instrumentals. CHUM, Ltd. dropped the longtime easy listening format on August 28, 1992. The new call letters CKKL-FM were acquired and the brand name Kool FM was used for the station's new Hot AC format. The first song was "Time, Love & Tenderness" by Michael Bolton. (The CFMO call sign and format were picked up by CHEZ-FM Inc., and adopted on what is now CKBY.)

During the hot AC days, they aired mostly contemporary hits during the evening hours (in large part due to CRTC regulations banning FM stations for having more than 50% of hit material on their playlists to protect AM stations and French-language stations), as well as the dance music show "Pirate Radio" with Chris Sheppard on Saturday nights. During the 1990s, CKKL competed against Top 40 stations CKTF-FM (which airs in French) and AM station Energy 1200 (which aired in English). Station liners during this time promoted "Hit Music on FM", directly targeting Energy 1200 listeners. After "Energy" flipped to alternative rock in 1997, CKKL was considered the default English-language hit music station in Ottawa. By February 2003, when CIHT-FM (now a CHR station) launched with its rhythmic contemporary format, CKKL completely shifted to CHR.

=== Bob FM ===
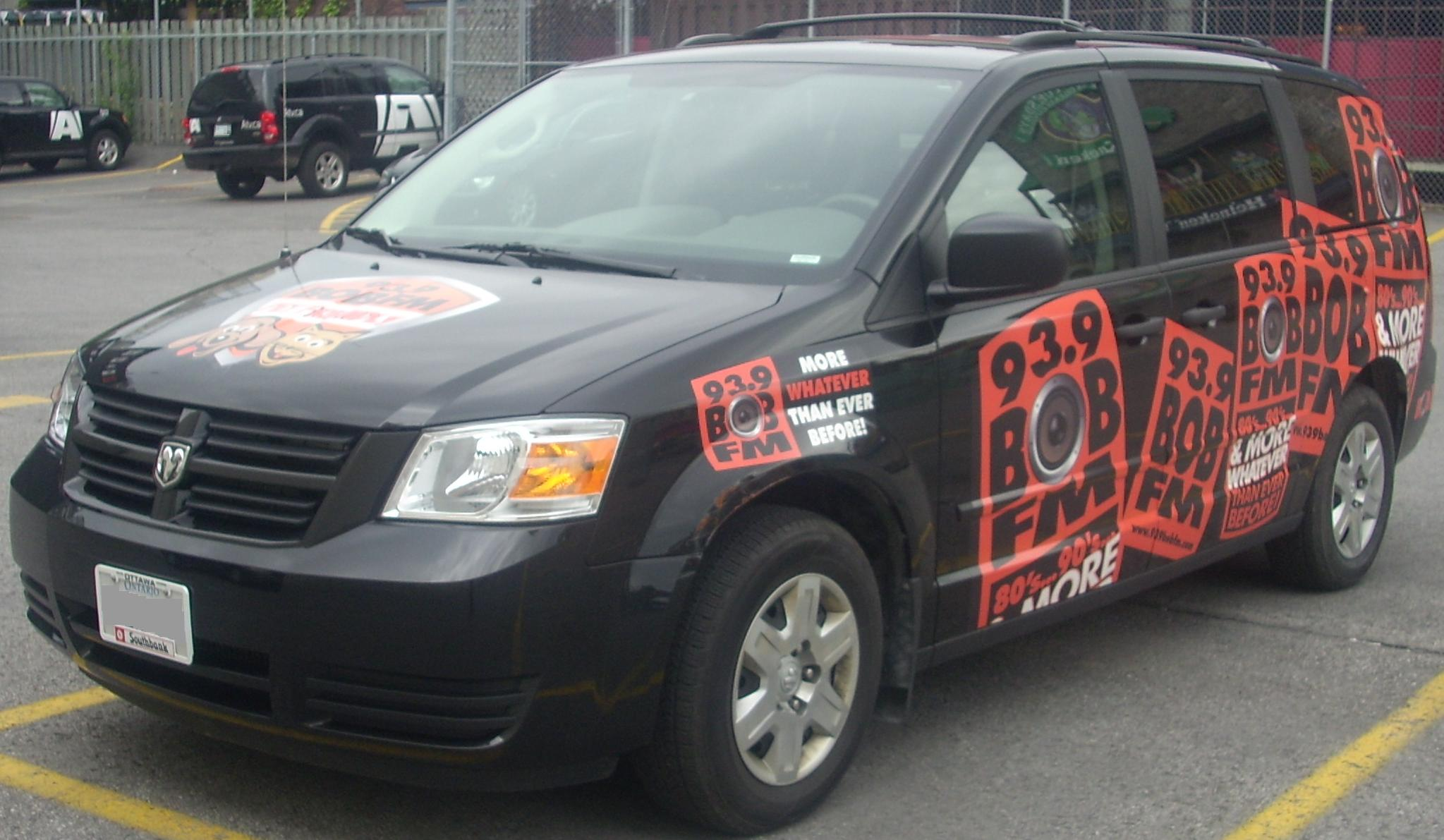
A Bob FM Dodge Grand Caravan

On May 31, 2003, at 9:39 AM, CKKL-FM dropped its CHR/Top 40 format, and began stunting with the audio from the movie What About Bob?. After the movie aired, snippets of music played, with "Bob FM" launching at noon that day, adopting the adult hits format. The first song on "Bob" was "I Want A New Drug" by Huey Lewis and The News.

Bob FM's morning show, Cub & Company, was hosted by Cub Carson and Melanie Adams, and until February 2013, Sandy Sharkey. The show was formerly hosted by "Stuntman" Stu Schwartz, who is now at CJMJ-FM.

In 2007, CTVglobemedia bought CKKL-FM along with the other CHUM Limited properties. In 2011, Bell Canada acquired CTVglobemedia, renaming the company as Bell Media.

On February 1, 2013, Bell Media announced that longtime Bob FM announcers Steve Gregory and Sandy Sharkey were leaving the station as a result of cuts.

Former logo as Bob FM

=== Pure Country 94 ===
On November 10, 2014, Bell Media announced that the "Bob FM" format would be discontinued, citing changing "market conditions" and the need to "pursue a new opportunity". All of the station's on-air talent, including Cub Carson, were laid off, and the station began airing blocks of music punctuated by promos announcing an impending relaunch. Its website referred Bob FM listeners to the online stream of sister station CJPT-FM.

On November 12, 2014 at 11:45 a.m., after again playing "I Want a New Drug" (a near-bookend to the launch of "Bob"), followed by "Like a Virgin" by Madonna, CKKL went into a 15-minute stunt of a ticking clock. At Noon, CKKL flipped to country as "New Country 94", launching with a marathon of 10,000 songs played without commercial interruption starting with "Cruise" by Florida Georgia Line. After the 10,000 song marathon, the station began airing advertisements again, preceding song number 10,001 and over.

On May 28, 2019, the station was renamed "Pure Country 94" as part of a nationwide rebranding of all Bell Media country stations. The station's morning hosts Sophie Moroz and Jeff Hopper began to host the iHeartRadio Pure Country Countdown for the network as well.
