= CJMI-FM =

Radio station in Strathroy, Ontario

Coordinates: 42°58′01″N 81°39′02″W

- Strathroy, Ontario; Canada
- Frequency: 105.7 MHz
- Branding: 105.7 myFM

Programming
- Format: Adult contemporary

Ownership
- Owner: My Broadcasting Corporation

History
- First air date: 2007
- Call sign meaning: Similar to "my"

Technical information
- Class: A
- ERP: 1,750 watts
- HAAT: 60 metres (200 ft)

Links
- Website: strathroytoday.ca

CJMI-FM, branded as 105.7 myFM, is an FM radio station located in Strathroy, Ontario, Canada. Owned by My Broadcasting Corporation, the station airs an adult contemporary format.
