= My Broadcasting Corporation =

Canadian radio broadcasting company

- Type: Private
- Industry: Media
- Founded: Renfrew, Ontario (2004)
- Products: Radio broadcasting
- Website: www.mybroadcastingcorp.com

My Broadcasting Corporation (MBC) is a Canadian broadcasting company founded in 2004 by Jon Pole and Andrew Dickson. Based in Renfrew, Ontario, the company operates a number of radio stations in small to medium-sized markets in Ontario.

== History ==
The roots of My Broadcasting Corporation date back to Ottawa Valley Radio in the mid-1980s (CKOA Arnprior and CKOB Renfrew). Those stations were owned by Jamie Pole, the father of current MBC co-owner and President Jon Pole. Jon's business partner and Executive VP of MBC, Andrew Dickson, was an announcer at CKOB in the late '70's and then filled in as morning announcer when Jamie Pole owned the station. The original morning man for myFM, Bob Rose (deceased) was the morning man for Ottawa Valley Radio for many years. Several former Ottawa Valley Radio staffers have returned to myFM and continue to be part of the team, including Rob Mise and Peter DeWolf (deceased).

In 2006, MBC applied for a second station in the Pembroke market, to play classic rock, although its application was denied. Similarly, the company's application to launch a new station in St. Thomas was denied in 2009.

In early 2009, MBC also announced a tentative deal to acquire CIYN-FM in Kincardine, which received CRTC approval on May 13, 2009. The company also received CRTC approval to launch a new station in Brighton on May 15, 2009.

On August 2, 2013, MBC submitted applications to operate new FM radio stations in Arnprior and Carleton Place, and acquiring Peterborough station CJMB-FM outright from McNabb Broadcasting. CJMB would be the company's first station in one of Ontario's larger radio markets; as well, the company planned to operate CJMB as a sports radio station which would be the company's first expansion outside of its conventional myFM branding and adult contemporary formatting. The CRTC approved the acquisition of CJMB-FM on December 11, 2013.

On December 9, 2013, MBC submitted an application to operate a new FM radio station at Orangeville, proposed to operate at 101.5 MHz, the new station received approval on July 18, 2014. MBC previously submitted an application to operate the new station there in 2012 but the application was soon withdrawn.

On an unknown date, MBC submitted an application to the CRTC for a new FM station on 107.7 FM (later 97.5) in Carleton Place, this application would be denied by the CRTC on April 2, 2014. Also on that date, the CRTC approved the new station in Arnprior, which will replace CHMY-FM-1 at 107.7.

In June 2015, MBC announced a deal to purchase Pineridge Broadcasting, the owner of CHUC-FM and CKSG-FM in Cobourg and CJWV-FM in Peterborough.

On July 11, 2016, MBC submitted an application to operate a new FM radio station at 93.7 MHz in Georgina.

On December 7, 2016, MBC submitted an application to operate a new FM radio station at 99.7 MHz in Simcoe. This application received CRTC approval on June 9, 2017

On April 13, 2017, MBC submitted an application to operate a new FM radio station in Georgina, as part of the CRTC's call applications. This application is pending CRTC approval.

On February 26, 2021, MBC announced a deal to acquire CHLK-FM in Perth.

On June 25, 2021, the CRTC approved a sale of CIMA-FM Alliston, CJML-FM Milton and CKMO-FM Orangeville by MBC to Local Radio Lab, led by former Haliburton Broadcasting Group owner Christopher Grossman. On June 30, 2021, the CRTC approved a sale of CIYN-FM Kincardine, CIYN-FM-1 Goderich and CIYN-FM-2 Port Elgin to Lakeside Radio Broadcasting Corp., owned by Greg Hetherington and Ray Stanton.

In August 2022, the company announced a deal to acquire CIXL-FM and CKYY-FM in Welland from Wellport Broadcasting.

In December 2022, Pole and Dickson agreed to acquire Border International Broadcasting—the U.S.-based licensee of WLYK in Cape Vincent, New York, which was operated by Rogers Media as a station serving Kingston—for $325,000.

On February 8, 2024, Bell Media announced that it would sell four of its stations in eastern Ontario to MBC, including CFJR-FM and CJPT-FM in Brockville and CFLY-FM and CKLC-FM in Kingston. This application was approved on February 26, 2025. On November 22, 2024, Rogers Sports & Media announced that it would sell three stations—CJDL-FM and CKOT-FM in Tillsonburg, and CJET-FM in Smiths Falls—to MBC, pending CRTC approval. The application was approved on June 30, 2025.

== Stations ==
City of license	Call sign	Frequency	Branding	New/Purchased	CRTC Decision #	Approval Date	Sign On/Purchase Date
Arnprior	CFMP-FM	107.7 FM	Wow FM	New	2005-453	08/01/05	01/20/06
Welland	CIXL-FM	91.7 FM	Giant FM	Purchased	L2022-45	09/20/22	10/01/22
Welland	CKYY-FM	89.1 FM	Niagara's New Country	Purchased	L2022-45	09/20/22	10/01/22
Brighton	CIYM-FM	100.9 FM	Wow FM	New	2009-277	05/15/09	12/10/09
Brockville	CFJR-FM	104.9 FM	myFM	Purchased	2025-59	02/26/25	03/24/25
Brockville	CJPT-FM	103.7 FM	Giant FM	Purchased	2025-59	02/26/25	03/24/25
Cobourg	CHUC-FM	107.9 FM	Classic Rock	Purchased	Letter of Approval	07/16/15	09/01/15
Cobourg	CKSG-FM	93.3 FM	myFM	Purchased	Letter of Approval	07/16/15	09/01/15
Exeter	CKXM-FM	90.5 FM	myFM	New	2008-161	08/04/08	07/15/09
Gananoque	CJGM-FM	99.9 FM	myFM	New	2010-404	06/23/10	07/11/11
Kingston	CFLY-FM	98.3 FM	Fly FM	Purchased	2025-59	02/26/25	03/24/25
Kingston	CKLC-FM	98.9 FM	Kingston's New Country	Purchased	2025-59	02/26/25	03/24/25
Napanee	CKYM-FM	88.7 FM	myFM	New	2006-634	11/11/06	09/13/07
Pembroke	CIMY-FM	104.9 FM	myFM	New	2005-366	08/02/05	09/12/05
Perth	CHLK-FM	88.1 FM	myFM	Purchased	Letter of Approval	03/12/21	05/01/21
Renfrew	CHMY-FM	96.1 FM	myFM	New	2004-147	04/16/04	08/02/04
Simcoe	CHCD-FM	98.9 FM	myFM	Purchased	Letter of Approval	01/01/13	01/01/13
Simcoe	CKNC-FM	99.7 FM	Wow FM	New	2017-191	06/09/17	01/09/17
Smiths Falls	CJET-FM	92.3 FM	Wow FM	Purchased	2025-162	06/30/25	08/01/25
St. Thomas	CKZM-FM	94.1 FM	myFM	New	2010-295	10/12/10	05/13/11
Tillsonburg	CKOT-FM	101.3 FM	Giant FM	Purchased	2025-162	06/30/25	08/01/25
Tillsonburg	CJDL-FM	107.3 FM	Tillsonburg's New Country	Purchased	2025-162	06/30/25	08/01/25
Peterborough	CJMB-FM	90.5 FM	FREQ	Purchased	2013-671	05/09/13	05/13/13
Peterborough	CJWV-FM	96.7 FM	Wow FM	Purchased	Letter of Approval	07/16/15	09/01/15
Strathroy	CJMI-FM	105.7 FM	myFM	New	2006-571	10/03/07	01/22/07

== Former stations ==
City of license	Call sign	Frequency	New/Purchased	CRTC Decision #	Approval Date	Sign On Date	Sold Date
Alliston	CIMA-FM	92.1 FM	New	2012-491	09/12/12	08/20/13	09/01/21
Goderich	CIYN-FM-1	99.7 FM	Purchased	2009-269	05/13/09	12/01/09	09/01/21
Kincardine	CIYN-FM	95.5 FM	Purchased	2009-269	05/13/09	12/01/09	09/01/21
Milton	CJML-FM	101.3 FM	New	2015-222	05/27/15	08/02/17	09/01/21
Orangeville	CKMO-FM	101.5 FM	New	2014-378	07/14/14	11/06/14	09/01/21
Port Elgin	CIYN-FM-2	90.9 FM	New	2010-145	03/12/10	01/20/11	09/01/21

=== Notes ===
^{1} Purchase approved by the CRTC in May 2009; transaction completed November 30, 2009.
