= CIND-FM =

Radio station in Toronto

Coordinates: 43°38′56.04″N 79°22′54.12″W

- Toronto, Ontario; Canada
- Broadcast area: Greater Toronto Area
- Frequency: 88.1 MHz (HD Radio)
- Branding: Indie88

Programming
- Format: Adult album alternative
- Subchannels: HD2: Active rock; HD3: Alternative rock

Ownership
- Owner: Local Radio Lab Inc.

History
- First air date: July 31, 2013
- Call sign meaning: "Indie"

Technical information
- Licensing authority: CRTC
- Class: B
- ERP: 4,800 watts average 12,000 watts peak
- HAAT: 281 metres (922 ft)

Links
- Webcast: Listen Live; Listen Live (HD2); Listen Live (HD3)
- Website: indie88.com realrocktoronto.com (HD2)

CIND-FM (88.1 FM, "Indie88") is a radio station in Toronto. Owned by Local Radio Lab, it broadcasts an adult album alternative (AAA) format.

The station was founded in 2013 by Central Ontario Broadcasting, who won a bid for the frequency in 2012 after the revocation of CKLN-FM's license. It soft launched on July 31, 2013, before officially launching on September 3, 2013.

Indie88's offices and studios are located on Hanna Avenue in Toronto's Liberty Village, while its transmitter is located on top of First Canadian Place in Toronto's Financial District.

== History ==
In September 2011, after the Canadian Radio-television and Telecommunications Commission (CRTC) revoked the license of CKLN-FM for repeated violations of the Broadcasting Act, Evanov Communications submitted an application seeking to move its low-powered CIRR-FM to a full-powered signal on its former 88.1 frequency. As per the CRTC's competitive licensing process, this triggered a call for competing applications. On September 11, 2012, the CRTC approved an application by Rock 95 Broadcasting Ltd., which proposed an "eclectic, Indie music format FM station focusing on emerging, independent artists from Canada".

Staffing announcements made before the station's launch included Megan Bingley (general manager), Adam Thompson (program director), Alan Cross, former announcer and program director of CFNY-FM, and Raina Douris, a broadcast personality formerly associated with CFNY and CBC Radio 3.

CIND-FM broadcast a full 24-hour online music stream throughout the period between its licensing date and its formal launch. On July 25, 2013, the station announced its formal launch date of July 31 at noon; at the same time, the station replaced its online stream and began test broadcasts on 88.1 FM, stunting with a loop of "Never Gonna Give You Up" by Rick Astley (in reference to the Rickroll meme).

The first song played on the station on its July 31 launch was Arcade Fire's "Ready to Start". The station planned to place an emphasis on on-air and online interaction with its audience.

The July 31 date, however, was a soft launch for the station; throughout August, the station aired a continuous music format with no hosted programming except for "Throne of Glory", an afternoon drive program in which a guest personality was invited to play music of their own choosing. Cross hosted the first "Throne of Glory" on August 1; other personalities who hosted throughout the month include Hannah Georgas, Joel Plaskett, Adam van Koeverden, Wade MacNeil, Born Ruffians, Silversun Pickups, k-os, Torquil Campbell, METZ, July Talk, Raina Douris, The New Pornographers, Matt Mays, Jay Ferguson, Dave Hodge, Dan Mangan, Toronto Star music critic Ben Rayner, Tokyo Police Club, Matthew Good, Hollerado, Ed the Sock and Liana K (Steven and Liana Kerzner), former CFNY personality Dave Bookman and former CFNY program director and personality Don Berns.

The station officially launched on September 3 with its full complement of on-air personalities and regular features; the station's regular schedule included Douris, Bookman, Brian Bailey, Candice Knihnitski, Matt Hart and Carlin Burton. Cross was also heard on the station as a contributing personality, voicing some of the station's identification bumpers and hosting a weekday programming feature called "Crackle and Pop" in which he played rare and classic songs from his own archive of vinyl singles, until he rejoined CFNY in August 2014. The station has also since added Brent Albrecht and Sarah Burke to its roster.

On November 1, 2013, the CRTC approved an application by the station to increase the average effective radiated power (ERP) of CIND-FM from 532 to 2,100 watts (maximum ERP increasing from 875 watts to 4,000 watts) and to decrease the effective height of antenna above average terrain (EHAAT) from 328.4 to 281 metres (1077' to 922'). In the most recent available Numeris ratings, the station held a 1.3 share of the Toronto radio audience, up from 0.8 in the prior ratings period.

On September 13, 2014, the station held the "Indie88 Birthday Bash" to celebrate its first birthday. The show, which took place at Toronto's Opera House concert hall, featured live performances by Lowell, The Darcys and Dan Mangan.

In 2015, former CBC Radio 3 host Lana Gay joined the station, while in early 2016, Bailey departed for reasons unknown.

After a months-long transitional period, Indie88 began its new regular schedule on April 11, 2016. Douris moved from afternoons to join Matt Hart as new co-host of the morning show, with Candice stepping back to report only news and weather, in light of her impending maternity leave. In the afternoon slot vacated by Douris, Lana Gay was appointed the new permanent afternoon drive host.

Douris left the station in fall 2016 to join CBC Radio 2, with Knihnitski returning as Hart's morning cohost. In 2017, former CFNY-FM personality Josie Dye joined the station as cohost of the morning show with Hart and Burton.

Bookman died on May 20, 2019, approximately one month after suffering an aneurysm which had left him in intensive care. On May 29, the station aired a special fundraising radiothon, "A Day to Make Music Count", to raise money in his memory for MusiCounts, the music education initiative of the Canadian Academy of Recording Arts and Sciences. The broadcast raised over CA$69,000, significantly exceeding the station's CA$50,000 goal.

In October 2023, Central Ontario Broadcasting announced a deal to sell the station to Local Radio Lab, a company established by former Haliburton Broadcasting Group president Christopher Grossman, pending CRTC approval.

Dye left the station in 2023 to join CHUM-FM, with Burton and Albrecht now hosting the morning show. In 2024, comedian Jackie Pirico also joined the morning show as co-host.

On July 29, 2024, the CRTC approved the sale of CIND to Local Radio Lab. The station shifted its playlist within the adult alternative format to include more crossover pop artists, and in early 2025 it reached number 5 in the ratings for its target ages 25-54. In December 2025, Local Radio Lab extended the Indie format and branding to its sister stations CIMA-FM in Alliston, CJML-FM in Milton, CKMO-FM in Orangeville, and CJFB-FM in Bolton.

After Albrecht left the station in June 2026, the morning show was hosted by Burton and Pirico.
