= CKPT-FM =

Radio station in Peterborough, Ontario

Coordinates: 44°17′36″N 78°21′19″W

- Peterborough, Ontario; Canada
- Broadcast area: Peterborough County
- Frequency: 99.7 MHz
- Branding: Pete 99.7

Programming
- Format: Adult hits

Ownership
- Owner: Durham Radio
- Sister stations: CKXP-FM

History
- First air date: December 1, 1959
- Former frequencies: 1420 kHz (AM) (1959–2008); 99.3 MHz (2007–2008)
- Call sign meaning: Peterborough

Technical information
- Class: B
- Power: 3,700 watts
- HAAT: 81.4 metres (267 ft)

Links
- Webcast: Listen Live
- Website: pete997.fm

CKPT-FM (99.7 FM, "Pete 99.7") is a radio station in Peterborough, Ontario. Owned by Durham Radio, it broadcasts an adult hits format. Its studios and offices are located on George Street North in Peterborough, while its transmitter is located on Greencrest Drive.

== History ==
=== 1420 AM ===
CKPT originally began broadcasting at 1420 AM on December 1, 1959. The station was powered at 1,000 watts by day and 500 watts at night. It was owned by the Peterborough Broadcasting Company. By the 1980s, the power increased to 10,000 watts day/5,000 watts night. CKPT aired an adult top 40 format in the 80s and 90s.

In May 2001, CKPT changed from its soft oldies format in favour of a national sports radio network The Team. In August 2002, after just over a year on the air, then-owner CHUM Limited reversed the decision on "The Team" format and returned to music, playing adult standards and oldies as 1420 Memories.

Prior to the switch to FM in 2007, the station was known as 1420 CKPT, Peterborough's Soft Favorites.

=== Switch to 99.3 FM ===
In March 2007, CKPT was given approval by the CRTC to convert to 99.3 MHz. The frequency was chosen by CHUM, Inc. Another station, CKKK-FM (now CJMB-FM), was willing to move from 99.5 to 90.5 in March 2007, so CKPT could move to 99.3 MHz. CKKK's move was approved on July 9, 2007. The frequency change to 90.5 took place on August 20, 2007.

Later in 2007, CKPT was one of the stations included in the takeover of CHUM Limited by CTVglobemedia (now Bell Media)

On August 21, 2007, CKPT-FM signed on 99.3 with a hot adult contemporary format under the new name Energy 99.3. The change came just one day after CKKK moved from 99.5 to 90.5 FM. The new CKPT signal simulcast on its old frequency until May 5, 2008.

=== Move to 99.7 ===
Logo as Energy 99.7, 2008-2020

On January 14, 2008, CKPT filed an application to relocate to 99.7 MHz, in order to resolve interference issues to CBCP-FM on 98.7 FM; this application was approved on February 27, 2008.

On June 2, 2008, the remaining AM towers in the four tower array on Crowley Line were taken down. A week earlier, two of the towers were actually toppled, because of structural deterioration. The same day the old AM towers came down on June 2, 2008, CKPT moved to 99.7 with the same format and moniker.

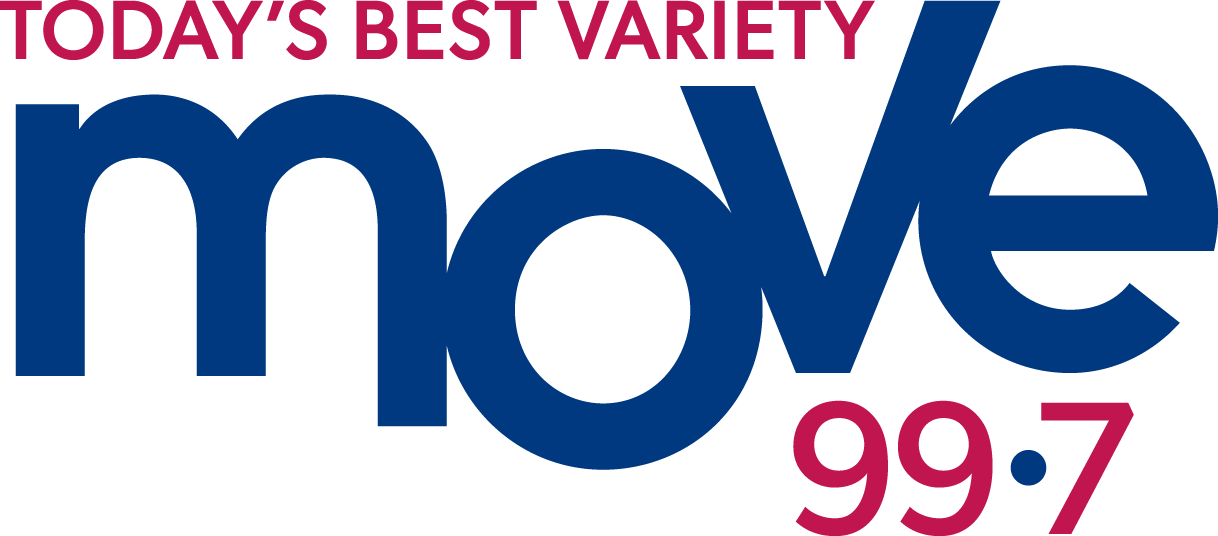
Logo as Move 99.7, 2020-2025

On December 27, 2020, as part of a nationwide rebranding by Bell Media, CKPT rebranded as Move 99.7.

=== Sale to Durham Radio ===
On February 8, 2024, Bell announced a restructuring that included the sale of 45 of its 103 radio stations to seven buyers, subject to approval by the CRTC, including CKPT, which is to be sold to Durham Radio. On January 30, 2025, the CRTC approved the sale to Durham.

On May 5, 2025, the station dropped the Move branding and began stunting with a broad array of popular music, while also directing listeners to submit song requests via the landing page LetsShakeItUp.ca. A week later, CKPT emerged from the stunt as Pete 99.7, with an adult hits format focusing on hit music from the 1980s to the present.
