= CHRO-TV =

Television station in Pembroke, Ontario

CHRO-TV and CHRO-DT-43

CHRO-TV: Pembroke, Ontario; CHRO-DT-43: Ottawa, Ontario; Canada
- Channels for CHRO-TV: Analog: 5 (VHF); Digital: allocated 7 (VHF)
- Channels for CHRO-DT-43: Digital: 35 (UHF); Virtual: 43
- Branding: CTV2 Ottawa (general); CTV Morning Live (morning show)

Programming
- Affiliations: CTV2

Ownership
- Owner: Bell Media Inc.
- Sister stations: CJOH-DT, CFGO, CFRA, CJMJ-FM, CKKL-FM

History
- First air date: August 19, 1961
- Former call signs: CHOV-TV (1961–1977)
- Former affiliations: CBC (1961–1991); CTV (1991–1997); Independent (1997–1998)

Technical information
- Licensing authority: CRTC
- ERP: CHRO-TV: 100 kW; CHRO-DT-43: 42.8 kW
- HAAT: CHRO-TV: 162.9 m (534 ft); CHRO-DT-43: 177.5 m (582 ft)
- Transmitter coordinates: CHRO-TV: 45°50′2″N 77°9′49″W; CHRO-DT-43: 45°13′2″N 75°33′49″W

Links
- Website: CTV2 Ottawa

CHRO-TV (analog channel 5) is a television station licensed to Pembroke, Ontario, Canada, serving the capital city of Ottawa as part of the CTV2 system. It is owned and operated by Bell Media alongside CTV outlet CJOH-DT (channel 13). The two stations share studios with Bell's Ottawa radio properties at the Market Media Mall building on George Street in downtown Ottawa's ByWard Market; CHRO-TV's transmitter is located on TV Tower Road near Pembroke. The station operates a digital-only rebroadcaster in Ottawa, CHRO-DT-43 (channel 43), with transmitter in the city's Herbert Corners section.

== History ==
The station first went on the air on August 19, 1961, as CHOV-TV, a CBC Television affiliate owned by Gordon Archibald Ottawa Valley Broadcasting, the owner of AM radio station CHOV. Workers of the station unionized and a labour dispute began. A financial crisis in 1976 led to the station going dark for six days in August of that year. Ottawa Valley sold the station to J. Conrad Lavigne in 1977. Lavigne adopted the CHRO-TV callsign, and opened a sales office for the station in Ottawa. Lavigne's company subsequently became part of the MCTV system in 1980. While most of the MCTV stations used "MCTV", rather than their call letters, as their on-air branding, CHRO continued to use its call sign, although it used the same logo and programming schedule as the other MCTV stations.

In 1986, MCTV filed an application to expand the service by disaffiliating from the CBC and adding a transmitter and broadcasting facilities in Ottawa, although the application process instead resulted in Baton Broadcasting being given a license to launch a new independent station in Ottawa. Standard Broadcasting, the owners of existing Ottawa television station CJOH-TV, responded to the potential new competition by selling CJOH to Baton, who then surrendered the new independent license. As a result, Mid-Canada submitted a revived application in 1989, but the application was withdrawn after Northern Cable, the owner of the MCTV system, underwent an ownership change to be financed by selling off its broadcasting assets.

Logo used in 1993.

Logo used from 1994 to 1997 (Note: Under the ownership of Baton Broadcasting, the MCTV branding used on CHRO still remained. The previous MCTV logo was dropped in 1994 when all of the other Baton-owned stations adopted a similar logo, the only difference being the call letters. Unlike other Baton-owned stations, the MCTV stations did not use their call signs in their logos. The logo featured multicoloured rings around the acronym BBS.)

In 1990, Baton Broadcasting acquired the MCTV stations. Because CHRO was carried by cable television companies in the Ottawa market, this was deemed an ownership conflict for Baton, which already owned Ottawa's CJOH, and would therefore have a de facto twinstick in competition with the CBC's CBOT-TV (channel 4). However, the station's carriage in Ottawa was also deemed essential to its survival, since Pembroke was too small a market to support the station on its own. Therefore, CHRO disaffiliated from the CBC, and became a CTV affiliate. The Canadian Radio-television and Telecommunications Commission (CRTC) also ordered strict controls on CHRO's programming, so that Baton could not gain unfair audience advantage in Ottawa by airing shows at different times on CHRO and CJOH. Baton eventually became the sole corporate proprietor of CTV.

=== As The New RO ===
Logo used as The New RO from 1998 to 2005.

In 1997, CHRO was one of several stations transferred to CHUM Limited in exchange for the ATV stations in Atlantic Canada. (Ironically, CHUM had been one of the applicants for the independent license that eventually went to Baton in the late 1980s; they would have launched a station similar to CITY-TV in Toronto, and even produced a pitch film. CITY itself would set up an Ottawa re-transmitter in 1996.) CHRO did not have an over-the-air transmitter in Ottawa until it came under CHUM's ownership. CHUM received approval from the CRTC to add a transmitter at Ottawa on channel 43 with the effective radiated power of 231,000 watts to rebroadcast the signal of CHRO-TV Pembroke. Ten months being acquired by CHUM, on September 7, 1998, CHRO was rebranded to "The New RO" and joined the NewNet system.

During its first two years under NewNet affiliation, CHRO began moving their operations away from their original Pembroke studios. They initially operated from a small studio at 10 Kimway Avenue, near CJOH's broadcast facility on Merivale Road. In October 2000, the station moved to a brand-new media complex, dubbed the CHUM MarketMediaMall, in Ottawa's historic ByWard Market neighborhood at 87 George Street. In addition to a Speaker's Corner video booth, the facility also housed CHUM's Ottawa-area radio stations (CKKL-FM, CJMJ-FM, CFRA and CFGO).

In February 2005, CHUM announced plans to consolidate the master control departments for CHRO, CKVR-DT, CFPL-DT, CHWI-DT and CKNX-TV at 299 Queen Street West in Toronto, and to consolidate the traffic and programming departments at CFPL in London, resulting in the loss of approximately 19 staff members from CHRO. On June 3, 2005, at approximately 10:30 a.m., the Pembroke master control signal came to an end, as the new consolidated master control took to air.

=== As A-Channel Ottawa ===
Former A Channel logo, 2005–2008.

The station was renamed A-Channel on August 2, 2005, along with the rest of the NewNet system, and began using the same logo as the rest of the system as well.

On July 12, 2006, CTV owner Bell Globemedia (now Bell Media) announced plans to purchase CHUM Limited for C$1.7 billion, with plans to divest itself of the A-Channel and Access Alberta stations. On the same date, CHRO cancelled its noon-hour lifestyles program and its 12:30 p.m. weekday newscast, citing low ratings and declining advertising revenues. Anchors James Hendricks and Dave Gross were also let go. A plan was announced to almost fully automate the station's news production system, which would see a few dozen staff members laid off by the start of the new year.

On April 9, 2007, Rogers Media announced an agreement to purchase all of the A-Channel stations including CHRO, SexTV: The Channel, Canadian Learning Television and Access Alberta. The deal was contingent on full approval by the CRTC of the CTVglobemedia takeover of CHUM. With CRTC approval being contingent on the sale of the Citytv stations instead, Rogers bought the Citytv stations and CTV kept the A-Channel stations. The takeover transaction was completed on June 22.

With the CHUM acquisition, CTV became the only English-language private television broadcaster offering Ottawa news coverage; it owns both CHRO and CJOH-TV, which compete only with the CBC's CBOT in offering local news. The CRTC's decision to allow the joint ownership of CJOH and CHRO appeared to contradict its own rationale for forcing CTV to sell the Citytv stations, specifically that a single company could not own two stations, in the same language, based in the same large urban centre – however, even before CTV confirmed it would keep CHRO, the twinstick was approved by the CRTC on the basis of CHRO's financial situation and the stations' prior common ownership (until 1997).

=== As A Ottawa ===
Former A logo, 2008–2011.

The station was rebranded as A on August 11, 2008, along with the rest of the A-Channel system. The A soft launch began earlier in June 2008 in CHRO-TV's press materials and local newscasts.

Due to a major fire that destroyed the longtime studios of sister CTV station CJOH-TV on Merivale Road in Nepean on February 7, 2010, CJOH integrated its operations with CHRO into the latter station's studios at 87 George Street in Ottawa's ByWard Market (which was already occupied by CHRO). As a result, CJOH's newscasts began to be produced from the facility, becoming the first time since the studios had any nighttime newscasts since the cancellation of CHRO's A News broadcasts in 2009.

=== As CTV Two/CTV2 Ottawa ===
Former CTV Two logo, 2011–2018.

On May 30, 2011, Bell Media announced that the A television system would be rebranded as CTV Two, with CHRO switching its branding from "A Ottawa" to "CTV Two Ottawa". The official relaunch to CTV Two took place on August 29, 2011. In addition, CHRO's morning show, A Morning was renamed CTV Morning Live. In addition, CHRO started broadcasting in high definition as part of the relaunched system on August 31, 2011.

== Past programming ==
- Ottawa Senators Hockey (20 regular-season games a year of the Canadian capital city's NHL team, which were usually, but not always, broadcast on Thursday evenings) – with Dean Brown as play-by-play announcer and Gord Wilson as commentator. Games were broadcast through the 2007–08 season, after which games were moved back exclusively to Sportsnet East, and later TSN5 (also owned by CHRO parent company Bell Media)
- Bob TV
- Majic 100 Top 20 Countdown
- Speaker's Corner Ottawa

== News operation ==
CHRO presently broadcasts 22 hours of locally produced newscasts each week, all consisting of four hours each weekday and two hours on Saturdays of a local version of CTV's local morning news program franchise CTV Morning Live.

Over the course of 1998, new graphics and presentation elements were added to the existing newscast that had been produced in Pembroke, and several reporters were forced out. By the summer, the only on-air staff in Pembroke were four anchors; the entire reporting staff was based in Ottawa. On September 7, coinciding with the change to The New RO, CHRO relaunched its news as NewsSixOttawa. The station dismissed Cathy Cox, who had been the lead anchor in Pembroke for seven years. The new Ottawa-based anchor team consisted of Caroline Redekopp and former CKVR anchor Robert Maxwell, with Ken Evraire on sports, former Weather Channel anchor Elissa Lansdell on weather and entertainment, and weekend anchor James Hendricks covering traffic and crime from the assignment desk. Cyndi Edwards hosted the New RO at Noon, which featured a mix of news, lifestyle and entertainment reports. Reporter Sandra Blaikie, who joined CHRO in 2000, took over from Caroline Redekopp after her departure in 2002. James Hendricks—by now the 11 p.m. anchor—replaced Robert Maxwell after his resignation in autumn 2003. Hendricks also continued to anchor the late news until Cory Atkins (late of CFRN-TV Edmonton) signed on to be the new 11 p.m. anchor in April 2004.

In January 2007, CHRO began producing its newscasts with a new system called "Ross Overdrive" – an automated production system that replaced the need for a switcher, VTR operator, graphics operator and many other staffers. Some 25 staffers were affected by the change, which had been announced some six months earlier.

On March 3, 2009, CTVglobemedia cancelled almost all of CHRO's local news programming except for A Morning, laying off 34 Ottawa employees. CTVglobemedia cited the current recession as a reason for cancelling the local news programming. In contrast, the A stations in Victoria, Barrie and London kept their evening newscasts but instead, had their morning shows cancelled; this was likely because CTV's CJOH-TV also owned by CTVglobemedia (now Bell Media) already produces higher-rated evening newscasts serving the Ottawa market.

In order to comply with the station's CRTC-mandated local programming expectation of 23 1/2 hours per week, the morning show was extended to four hours a day on weekdays, with a two-hour Saturday edition added as well (CHRO also continues two one-hour weekend music video programs co-branded with local Bell Media Radio stations). Some high-profile CHRO personalities such as Sandra Blaikie, Tony Grace and Bill Welychka were moved to the extended morning show following the March 2009 layoffs. In December 2009, anchor Sandra Blaikie left the station to pursue other interests outside broadcasting, because of the uncertain future of local television in Canada. In September 2010, late evening anchor and national reporter Tony Grace left the station to assume the 6 p.m. anchor position at CKVR in Barrie. In August 2011, Bill Welychka was let go from CHRO. In early September 2011, national reporter Jennifer Madigan left the station as all CTV Two stations began using CTV National News resources for national and international stories.

== Technical information ==
=== Subchannel ===
Subchannel of CHRO-DT-43
Channel	Res.	Short name	Programming
43.1	1080i	CHRO	CTV2

=== Analog-to-digital conversion ===
On August 31, 2011, when Canadian television stations in CRTC-designated mandatory markets transitioned from analog to digital broadcasts, CHRO's Ottawa transmitter, CHRO-TV-43, ceased analog transmissions and began broadcasting in digital on its former analog allocation of UHF channel 43. CHRO's main transmitter in Pembroke is not yet required to switch to digital, since the CRTC did not designate Pembroke as a mandatory market.

=== Spectrum reallocation ===
As part of the 2016 United States wireless spectrum auction, channels 38 through 51 were removed from television broadcasting in the United States and Canada. CHRO-DT-43 was reassigned from channel 43 to channel 35, using virtual channel 43. The change was completed on July 3, 2020.
