= CFRA =

Radio station in Ottawa, Ontario, Canada

Coordinates: 45°25′39.1″N 75°41′28.2″W

- Ottawa, Ontario; Canada
- Broadcast area: National Capital Region; Eastern Ontario; Western Quebec
- Frequency: 580 kHz
- Branding: 580 CFRA

Programming
- Format: News/Talk

Ownership
- Owner: Bell Media; (Bell Media Radio)
- Sister stations: CFGO, CJMJ-FM, CKKL-FM, CJOH-DT, CHRO-TV

History
- First air date: May 3, 1947
- Former frequencies: 560 kHz (1947–1962)
- Call sign meaning: Founder Frank Ryan

Technical information
- Licensing authority: CRTC
- Class: B
- Power: 50,000 watts day; 30,000 watts night
- Repeater: 100.3 CJMJ-HD2 (Ottawa)

Links
- Webcast: Listen Live
- Website: iheartradio.ca/580-cfra

CFRA is a news/talk formatted radio station in Ottawa, Ontario, Canada, owned by Bell Media. The station broadcasts on the assigned frequency of 580 kHz. CFRA's studios are located in the Bell Media Building on George Street in Downtown Ottawa's ByWard Market, while its 4-tower transmitter array is located near Manotick.

== History ==
Frank Ryan founded the station, which began broadcasting with a 1,000-watt transmitter at 560 kHz on May 3, 1947. The first studios were located at the Ottawa Auditorium on O'Connor Street, where the station spent its first ten years. In 1962, the station moved to its current frequency of 580 kHz and increased its daytime power to 50 kW, and nighttime power to 10 kW.

After Ryan's death in 1965, ownership of the station passed to his wife Kathleen, who subsequently sold CFRA and sister station CFMO-FM to CHUM Limited in 1968.

CFRA played pop music until the mid-1980s as Ottawa's leading Top 40 music station, known in the late '70s and early '80s for its hugely popular and controversial evening host Mark Elliot. So popular was Elliot at his peak that he was tapped to be a presenter at the Juno Awards in 1985. Much of Elliot's wildness on the air could be attributed to the fact that he was suffering from drug and alcohol addictions at the time. One of Elliot's most eyebrow-raising behaviors came in 1986 when he quit on the air

In January 2012, Bell Media applied to increase nighttime power to 30 kW noting that co-channel stations in Antigonish (CJFX-FM), Baie-Comeau (CHLC-FM) and Thunder Bay (CKPR-FM) have all switched to FM. On September 26, 2012, Bell Media's application received CRTC approval to increase CFRA's night-time power from 10 to 30 kW and by modifying its antenna pattern (improving reception towards Montreal), resulting in changes to its authorized contours. All other technical parameters would remain unchanged. CFRA would remain on 580 kHz.

== Lowell Green CBSC complaints ==
A complaint against Lowell Green was launched in 2008 after a provocative show on December 4, 2008 about the Muslim faith. The topic began with Green speaking about a school which had named a teddy bear Muhammad. Green then led a discussion on whether the Muslim faith was radical and violent. Lowell himself took the view that it was radical and violent at its core. The complaint to the Canadian Broadcast Standards Council (CBSC) was launched in December 2008. The CBSC responded that no standards had been broken and there was no obligation for Green to be uncritical of the topic at hand.

== Notable staff ==
- Ernie Calcutt (1961 to 1984), Ottawa Rough Riders commentator and news director
- Les Lye (1948 to 1960s) announcer and morning host
- Rich Little (late 1950s to early 1960s) relief announcer, disc jockey, appeared in comedy sketches on Les Lye's morning show.
