= CJMB-FM =

Radio station in Peterborough, Ontario

Coordinates: 44°17′38″N 78°21′18″W

- Peterborough, Ontario; Canada
- Broadcast area: Peterborough County
- Frequency: 90.5 MHz
- Branding: Freq 90.5

Programming
- Format: Classic alternative
- Affiliations: Toronto Blue Jays Radio Network; Peterborough Petes

Ownership
- Owner: My Broadcasting Corporation
- Sister stations: CJWV-FM

History
- First air date: 2004
- Former call signs: CKKK-FM (2004–2009)
- Former frequencies: 99.5 MHz (2004–2007)

Technical information
- Class: A1
- Power: 1,750 watts
- HAAT: 75 metres (246 ft)

Links
- Website: ptbotoday.ca

CJMB-FM (90.5 FM, "Freq 90.5") is a radio station in Peterborough, Ontario. Owned by My Broadcasting Corporation, it broadcasts a classic alternative format.

The studios and offices are on George Street in Peterborough. The transmitter is off Greencrest Drive.

== History ==
The station received CRTC approval on June 9, 2004 and was launched on 99.5 FM on November 25, 2004, at 80 Hunter St. East by King's Kids Promotions Outreach Ministries with a christian format including talk and music. The studios later moved to the Kingswood Life Center at 993 Talwood Drive.

Formerly known as "KAOS" radio, the station's first callsign was CKKK-FM.

In March 2007, CKKK-FM applied to move to 90.5 FM. CKPT, then on 1420 AM, was approved in 2007 to move to 99.3 which is the adjacent frequency of 99.5. On July 9, 2007, CKKK received CRTC approval to move to 90.5 FM.

On August 20, 2007, CKKK-FM moved from 99.5 MHz to its current frequency at 90.5 MHz just over a month after the approval from the CRTC.

On March 31, 2008, CKKK went dark after being blocked from its new tower site at 1001 Talwood Drive. This, despite the fact that the project was approved by the CRTC and Industry Canada in August 2007.

The station, plus previous and current ownership of the tower site at 1001 Talwood Drive were not able to resolve differences.

=== Sale to McNabb & new format ===
The CRTC approved the sale of the station on June 26, 2009, to Andy McNabb, on behalf of a company to be incorporated. Soon after, a corporate structure was formed, 100% owned by Andy McNabb, and 4352416 Canada Inc. was incorporated. The station then adopted its current callsign CJMB-FM.

On December 3, 2009, the CRTC approved the station's application for a new tower site and a power increase from 50 to 206 watts.

CJMB-FM began testing their new signal broadcasting on 90.5 MHz on October 14, 2010, at 4:05 PM, featuring the song "Stronger" by Hillsong Worship.

In December 2010, the station finished its technical testing and became the only station in the city broadcasting "Local News Every Hour", as well as the only station in the city broadcasting "All Christmas Music, All The Time" during the holiday season. In addition, the station presented play-by-play coverage of the Peterborough Petes, Toronto Maple Leafs and the Toronto Blue Jays.

The licence was awarded personally to Andy McNabb, who is the 100% owner of the assets of CJMB-FM and 100% owner of the shares of the corporate structure.

With no change in effective control, the matter of transfer of assets from the corporate holdings that are 100% owned by one person, directly to a portfolio of personal holdings that are 100% owned by the same person, would be published by the CRTC when said filings are deemed as processed by CRTC staff.

=== Sale to My Broadcasting Corporation ===
On May 17, 2013, My Broadcasting Corporation (MBC) took over the management of CJMB-FM from McNabb Broadcasting. My Broadcasting Corporation applied to the CRTC to purchase the assets of CJMB-FM. In the interim, the CRTC provided My Broadcasting approval to operate CJMB-FM under a temporary management agreement.

Under its ownership, CJMB flipped to talk radio as Extra 90.5, carrying a mix of news, information, and sports programming. Its sports programming included The Regulars—a local program hosted by veteran Canadian sportscaster John Badham, CBS Sports Radio's The Jim Rome Show and John Feinstein, and coverage of the Peterborough Lakers of Major Series Lacrosse (alongside existing play-by-play rights for the Peterborough Petes, Toronto Blue Jays, and Toronto Maple Leafs). The station planned to air a block of Christian programming on Sundays in order to meet the station's license conditions for the airplay of religious music; MBC president Jon Pole noted that the license called for 95% of music played by the station to be non-classic religious music, but that this would merely be a technicality since the majority of its new lineup was talk programming. In February 2016, the station picked up Bubba the Love Sponge, becoming the program's first-ever Canadian affiliate.

During a license renewal in 2018, the CRTC approved amendments to CJMB's licensed format requested by MBC, replacing the requirement to carry religious music with a condition requiring at least 50% of its weekly programming to be spoken word, and allowing up to 25% of programming per-week to be music programming (with at least 38% of this programming being Canadian music). Although the CRTC admonished the station for violations of license conditions found in a week of programming from October 2016 (including not airing enough hours of local programming, and airing a program on emerging and Indigenous musicians that contained non-religious music—albeit noting the station quickly removed the offending program), the Commission acknowledged the station's circumstances, financial issues, and position in comparison to other commercial stations in the market (which benefit from stronger signals and vertical integration), and believed that the changes made the license more reflective of CJMB-FM's current programming, whilst continuing to be "complementary to, rather than imitative of, the programming offered by other Peterborough stations."

On June 26, 2020, CJMB flipped to classic alternative as Freq 90.5,, with a focus on alternative rock hits from the 1990s and 2000s, while also retaining a slate of news and sports programming. In its next license renewal, MBC applied for the formal removal of the license conditions restricting the amount of music programming CJMB may carry. It cited that uncertainties created by the impact of the COVID-19 pandemic on sports were the main impetus for the format change, and that lifting the restriction would allow it to more effectively compete with the other commercial stations in the market. In August 2023, the CRTC renewed CJMB's license, and removed the conditions of service limiting music programming.
