= Pure Country (radio network) =

Canadian radio network

- Type: Radio network
- Country: Canada
- Headquarters: Toronto, Ontario, Canada

Programming
- Format: Country

Ownership
- Owner: Bell Media Radio (Bell Media)

History
- Founded: by Bell Media
- Launch date: May 28, 2019

Links
- Website: (see each station's articles)

Pure Country is a Canadian radio network, that airs on stations owned by Bell Media. Launched in 2019 as a unifying branding for all of the company's country-formatted stations across Canada, the network broadcasts on eight stations nationwide, as well as on selected digital subchannels of radio stations in markets where the company offers digital radio service but does not have a country-formatted primary station.

== Programming ==
Weekday programming on the network consists of local hosts at each station in morning and afternoon drive, a national midday program hosted by Roo Phelps, and the syndicated The Bobby Bones Show in the evening. CIMX-FM in Windsor also clears Bobby Bones in its standard morning time slot in lieu of a local morning show (it has not been cleared by any other country station in the neighbouring Detroit market). On weekends, CKKL/Ottawa's morning hosts Sophie Moroz and Jeff Hopper host the iHeartRadio Pure Country Countdown, while the stations also air the syndicated Country Top 30 with Bobby Bones.

In January 2020, the network's station in Kingston committed to playing a 50/50 balance of male and female country artists for one week, to draw attention to continued gender inequity in the music business.

== Stations ==
=== British Columbia ===
- Vancouver - CHQM-FM HD2
- Victoria - CHBE-FM HD3

=== Manitoba ===
- Brandon - CKXA-FM

=== New Brunswick ===
- Fredericton - CKHJ

=== Ontario ===
- Kitchener - CFCA-FM HD2
- London - CJBX-FM
- Orillia/Barrie - CICX-FM
- Ottawa - CKKL-FM
- Pembroke - CHVR-FM
- Sudbury - CICS-FM
- Toronto - CHUM-FM HD2

=== Saskatchewan ===
- Regina - CHBD-FM

== Former stations ==
=== British Columbia ===
- Dawson Creek - CJDC (The Ranch)
- Terrace/Prince Rupert - CJFW-FM (The River)
- Vernon/Kelowna - CICF-FM (The Ranch)

=== New Brunswick ===
- Woodstock - CJCJ-FM (The Wave)

=== Nova Scotia ===
- Truro - CKTY-FM (Cat Country)

=== Ontario ===
- Kingston - CKLC-FM (Kingston's New Country)
- Peterborough - CKXP-FM (KX105)
- Windsor - CIMX-FM (formerly, now alternative rock 89X)
