= CKMO (AM) =

Former radio station in Victoria, British Columbia

- Victoria, British Columbia; Canada
- Frequency: 900 kHz
- Branding: Village 900

Programming
- Format: campus radio

Ownership
- Owner: Camosun College; (CKMO Radio Society)

History
- First air date: 1993 (FM); 2000 (AM)
- Last air date: March 4, 2012
- Former frequencies: 103.1 FM (1993–2000)
- Call sign meaning: closest available call sign to Camosun

Technical information
- Class: B
- Power: 10 kW

CKMO was a radio station broadcasting on AM 900 in Victoria, British Columbia, Canada. Branded as Village 900, it was the campus radio station of the city's Camosun College.

== History ==
CAMO Radio was originally launched in 1973 as a closed circuit station on the Camosun College Lansdowne campus for the purpose of providing students in the Applied Communication Program (ACP) with practical on-air and station management experience. ACP and CAMO were founded by Kermit Carlson. In 1991, the student-run CAMO Radio Society incorporated as a non-profit organization and began to prepare an application for a low-power FM licence. That licence was granted by the Canadian Radio-television and Telecommunications Commission in 1993. The station began broadcasting that year on FM 103.1 as CKMO-FM, adopting the CKMO call sign (as CA is not among the ITU prefixes assigned to Canada).

In 1995, the station began its "Education on the Air" program, broadcasting college courses. In 1996, Education on the Air won an award for excellence in community radio broadcasting from the National Campus and Community Radio Association.

In 2000, CKMO and Rogers Media' CJVI applied to the CRTC to swap frequencies. The application was approved, and on September 4, CKMO began broadcasting on 900 AM with a power of 10,000 watts, while CJVI took over the 103.1 FM frequency. Also that year, CKMO moved to a full-time roots music format.

In 2010, the station won a second National Campus and Community Radio Association outstanding achievement award in the Aboriginal Affairs and Cultural Programming category for the program Healing Hands.

The station announced in February 2011 that it would cease broadcasting on 900 AM and would be available only through internet streaming. CKMO's transmitter shut down on March 4, 2012 at midnight, when its agreement with Rogers Media ended.

On March 4, 2012, CKMO ceased terrestrial broadcasting; its licence was surrendered.

== Other stations using CKMO call ==
From 1928 to 1955, the call letters CKMO were used at a pioneer radio station in Vancouver, which was licensed to the Sprott-Shaw School of Commerce. On February 1, 1992, CKOC in Hamilton, Ontario dropped its historical call letters and adopted CKMO. However, after a few months the Hamilton station changed owners, and the CKOC call sign was restored. In 1993, CKMO became available for assignment to Camosun College, until 2012. In 2014, the CKMO call sign now belongs to a radio station in Orangeville, Ontario as CKMO-FM.
