= CFGO =

Radio station in Ottawa, Ontario, Canada

- Ottawa, Ontario; Canada
- Broadcast area: National Capital Region
- Frequency: 1200 kHz
- Branding: TSN 1200 Ottawa

Programming
- Format: Sports radio
- Affiliations: TSN Radio; ESPN Radio; Fox Sports Radio; Ottawa Senators

Ownership
- Owner: Bell Media; (Bell Media Ottawa Radio Partnership)
- Sister stations: CFRA; CJMJ-FM; CKKL-FM; CJOH-DT; CHRO-TV

History
- First air date: June 7, 1964
- Former call signs: CKPM (1964–1972); CJBZ (1997–1999)
- Former frequencies: 1440 kHz (1964–1986)
- Call sign meaning: "Greater Ottawa" (broadcast area)

Technical information
- Licensing authority: CRTC
- Class: B
- Power: 50,000 watts
- Transmitter coordinates: 45°25′39.1″N 75°41′28.2″W
- Repeater: 100.3 CJMJ-HD3 (Ottawa)

Links
- Webcast: Listen live
- Website: iheartradio.ca/tsn/tsn-ottawa

CFGO (1200 AM, "TSN 1200 Ottawa") is a commercial radio station licensed to Ottawa, Ontario, Canada. Owned by Bell Media, it carries a sports format as the local affiliate for TSN Radio and flagship for the Ottawa Senators, with studios located in Downtown Ottawa's ByWard Market and transmitter sited in Barrhaven. In addition to a standard analog transmission, CFGO is available online via iHeartRadio.

== History ==
=== Music format ===
On June 7, 1964, Confederation Broadcasting signed on CKPM on 1440 AM. CKPM aired a middle of the road (MOR) format with popular adult music and a heavy local news commitment.

In 1970, the Canadian Radio-television and Telecommunications Commission revoked Confederation's licence, alleging that the company had failed to live up to its financial and management obligations. Confederation appealed to the Supreme Court of Canada, who ruled in April 1971 that Confederation had not had a fair hearing before the CRTC.

In 1972, majority interest in the station was sold to Baton Broadcasting. The station also adopted its current CFGO call sign that year and moved to a Top 40 music format to compete with top-rated CFRA.

=== Frequency and format changes ===
On November 15, 1984, CFGO Radio Ltd. received approval from the CRTC to change CFGO's frequency to 1200 kHz with power remaining at 50,000 watts day and night. The station moved to AM 1200 on January 5, 1986, improving its signal. It was sold to Rawlco Communications the following year.

Playing Starship's "We Built This City" as the inaugural song on the new 1200 AM frequency, Rawlco transitioned the station from Top 40 to adult contemporary music as "Adult Rock, Go 1200" at the same time as the frequency switch, with local actress Abby Hagyard (of You Can't Do That on Television fame) serving as morning co-host. However, following CFRA's move from contemporary hits to an AC/oldies mix in August 1986, CFGO switched back to its previous all-hit presentation within a month. On March 8, 1988, Rawlco relaunched the contemporary hit radio format, with the station downplaying its callsigns in favour of the name Energy 1200, and the station began broadcasting in C-QUAM AM stereo. The station changed its call sign to CJBZ and its brand name to The Buzz in August 1997, with a focus on more alternative rock and modern rock.

=== All-sports format ===
The Team 1200 logo

On September 9, 1998, at 7:30 a.m., the station switched to its current all-sports radio format, using the brand name OSR1200 - Ottawa Sports Radio. It was acquired the following year by CHUM Limited, reverting to its CFGO call sign. In 1999, the station adopted the Team 1200 brand name.

On May 7, 2001, the station formed the basis for CHUM's short-lived national sports radio network The Team, which adopted the Ottawa station's brand identity. The station retained its format and brand when CHUM subsequently folded the network.

On June 22, 2007, CFGO along with the other CHUM stations were sold to CTVglobemedia (now known as Bell Media). On September 30, 2013, CFGO re-branded as TSN Radio 1200.

== Programming ==
TSN 1200 broadcasts a wide variety of sports programming, as well as news and weather, and the station streams Fox Sports Radio and ESPN Radio at night. As the official radio station of the Ottawa Senators, it broadcasts every Ottawa Senators game live. The station also broadcasts Ottawa 67's games, Ottawa Redblacks games, Atlético Ottawa games, Ottawa Blackjacks games, and formerly broadcast Ottawa Lynx games. Through its affiliation with TSN Radio, the station is an affiliate of the Buffalo Bills Radio Network.

Notable programs include TSN Mornings, In the Box, The Drive, Offside With Eric Macramalla, Sens Pre/Post-game Shows, RedBlacks Radio Show, Junior Hockey Magazine, among several others.

== Live sports ==
TSN Radio 1200 is the flagship station for the following teams' radio broadcasts:

- Ottawa Senators (NHL hockey)
- Ottawa 67's (OHL hockey)
- Ottawa Redblacks (CFL football)
- Atlético Ottawa (CPL soccer)
- Ottawa Blackjacks (CEBL basketball)

TSN Radio 1200 also features live coverage of the following:

- Buffalo Bills (NFL football)
- Toronto Blue Jays (select games)
- Belleville Senators (select games)
- World Juniors
- NBA Basketball (select games)
