= CFLY-FM =

Radio station in Kingston, Ontario

Coordinates: 44°25′35″N 76°38′19″W

- Kingston, Ontario; Canada
- Broadcast area: Eastern Ontario
- Frequency: 98.3 MHz
- Branding: 98.3 FLY FM

Programming
- Format: Adult contemporary
- Affiliations: Premiere Networks

Ownership
- Owner: My Broadcasting Corporation
- Sister stations: CKLC-FM, WLYK

History
- First air date: January 1954
- Former call signs: CKLC-FM (1953–1978)

Technical information
- Licensing authority: CRTC
- Class: C1
- ERP: 95,500 watts
- HAAT: 158 metres (518 ft)

Links
- Webcast: Listen live
- Website: https://www.kingstondaily.ca

CFLY-FM (98.3 MHz) is a commercial radio station broadcasting in Kingston, Ontario, and is owned by My Broadcasting Corporation. It airs an adult contemporary format branded as 98.3 FLY FM. The studios and offices are on Princess Street in Kingston.

CFLY-FM's transmitter is sited in Harrowsmith. The station's line up includes Reid & Ben In The Morning on weekdays, Carly Kincaid on midday, Wendy Wright in the afternoons, and Liveline With Mason every night except Sundays. On the weekends CFLY carries American Top 40 and Rick Dees Weekly Top 40.

== History ==
=== CKLC-FM ===
The station signed on the air in January 1954. Its original call sign was CKLC-FM. It was owned by St. Lawrence Broadcasting with studios on Brock Street. Sister station CKLC 1380 AM was launched at the same time with the two stations simulcasting their programming. CKLC-FM's original frequency was 99.5 MHz, and it was an affiliate of the Canadian Broadcasting Corporation's Dominion Network until the network dissolved in 1962.

CKLC-FM's original purpose in 1953 was to provide a reliable audio link for CKLC-AM, which broadcast from a four-tower array on Wolfe Island. Equalized Bell Telephone broadcast lines were not reliable to Wolfe Island in that era so the FM signal carried the program feed of CKLC-AM, which was received at the AM transmitter site over the air, and re-broadcast on the 1380 AM signal.

=== CFLY-FM ===
Eventually, the Bell line problem was resolved, allowing CKLC-FM to develop its own separate programming, playing automated beautiful music. CKLC-FM moved to 98.3 in 1973. It changed its call letters to CFLY-FM in 1978.

The stations were acquired by CHUM Limited in 1998. Since the 1980s, CFLY has programmed some form of adult contemporary music as FLY FM. In 1998, the station moved to a hot adult contemporary format, and in 2001, moved back to a mainstream adult contemporary sound. In early 2007, the station returned to hot AC. On June 22, 2007, the stations were acquired by CTVglobemedia, now Bell Media.

Former "FLY FM" Logo until 2020

=== Move 98.3 ===
On December 27, 2020, as part of a consolidation of Bell Media radio stations into national brands, CFLY rebranded as part of Bell's Move Radio brand as Move 98.3, with no change in format. The station ran without DJs for the first week of the format as the "Move" branding was introduced. The on-air staff returned on January 4, 2021.

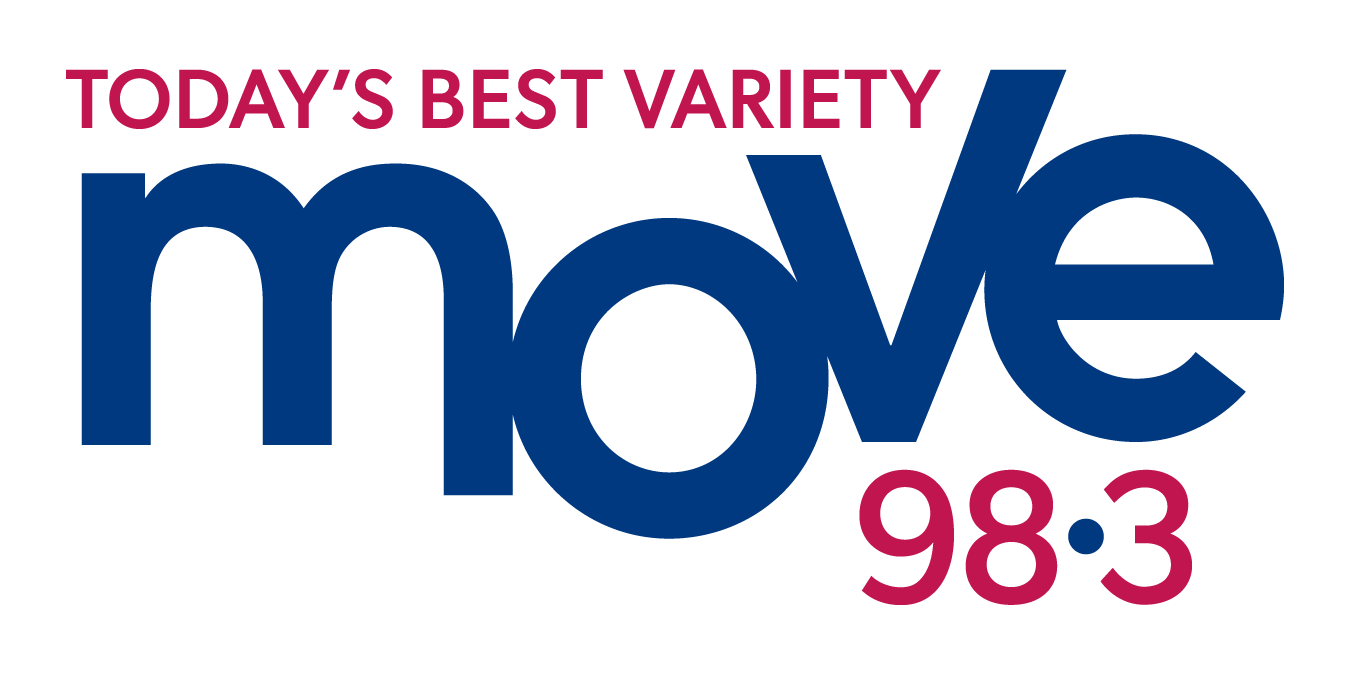
"Move Radio" branding used until 2025

=== Sale to My Broadcasting, return to FLY FM ===
On February 8, 2024, Bell announced a restructuring that included the sale of 45 of its 103 radio stations to seven buyers, subject to approval by the CRTC. This included CFLY, which was sold to My Broadcasting Corporation (MBC). The sale was approved by the CRTC on February 26, 2025.

On March 24, 2025, CFLY dropped the Move branding and revived its previous FLY FM branding, with no change in format.

On May 12th, 2025, CFLY picked up Liveline with Mason, becoming the first affiliate station for the show in Canada.
