= CKOT-FM =

Radio station in Tillsonburg, Ontario

Coordinates: 43°00′44″N 80°50′09″W

- Tillsonburg, Ontario; Canada
- Broadcast area: Southwestern Ontario
- Frequency: 101.3 MHz
- Branding: 101.3 Giant FM

Programming
- Format: Classic rock

Ownership
- Owner: My Broadcasting Corporation
- Sister stations: CJDL-FM

History
- First air date: October 1, 1965

Technical information
- Class: B
- ERP: 26,000 watts
- HAAT: 205.5 metres (674 ft)

Links
- Webcast: Listen Live
- Website: oxfordtoday.ca

CKOT-FM (101.3 FM, "101.3 Giant FM") is a Canadian radio station licensed to Tillsonburg, Ontario and serving the London area. Owned by My Broadcasting Corporation, the station broadcasts an classic rock format. Its transmitter is located near the interchange of Highway 19 and Highway 401 (Exit 218), close to Ingersoll.

== History ==
CKOT-FM is the second radio station to serve Tillsonburg, Ontario, and is the sister station to the now defunct CKOT and the current operating CJDL-FM.

The station's history dates back to 1964. Its owner was the late John B. Lamers (1905-April 17, 1994). His application for a radio station on the FM dial at 106.7 FM was accepted, but he was advised to use the frequency of 100.5 FM instead. The station first aired on October 1, 1965. Its ERP was 1,135 watts. Its studios were in Tillsonburg, while its transmitter was located to the northwest of the town. CKOT-FM originally acted as a simulcast transmitter while CKOT was on the air (the FM transmitter was able to operate from 6 a.m. to midnight, even though the AM station could only air from sunrise to sunset, as it was a daytimer station). Since the FM station was on the air longer, it proved to be successful.

By January 1970, CKOT-FM and CKOT had adopted different programming. CKOT-FM adopted "The Sound of Music" easy listening format, while the AM station became known as "Active, Lively, Community Information Radio".

In 1974, the station was granted permission to move to 101.3 MHz, to increase its power to 50,000 watts, and to move its transmitter to a new site (its current location). This went into effect in December 1974.

In 1996, the CRTC approved a change of ownership of Tillsonburg Broadcasting Co. Ltd., resulting in John D. Lamers, Jr. increasing his ownership interest from 36.8 to 50.3%. This gave him a controlling interest in his Tillsonburg Broadcasting (also known as the "John D. Lamers Group"), and its two radio stations (CKOT-AM-FM). Other shareholders are Robert Lamers and Joanne Fenton.

On February 17, 2013, CKOT operating at 1510 kHz left the air and was one of Canada's last daytime-only radio stations.

On September 27, 2016, Tillsonburg Broadcasting Company announced that it had sold its stations to Rogers Media pending CRTC approval, ending over 50 years of local ownership. The CRTC approved the transfer of ownership on July 13, 2017.

Former logo as "Easy 101.3" used from 2018-2025

On August 15, 2018, the station re-branded from Easy 101 to Easy 101.3 (with branding modelled upon other Rogers-owned AC stations) and revamped its programming, replacing its local personalities with voice tracked talent from its sister stations, and dropping older music in favour of a mainstream adult contemporary format.

On November 22, 2024, Rogers announced its intent to sell CKOT-FM and CJDL-FM to My Broadcasting Corporation (MBC), pending CRTC approval. The transaction was approved by the CRTC on June 30, 2025. On August 1, 2025, MBC flipped the station to classic rock as 101.3 Giant FM.
