= CJMJ-FM =

Radio station in Ottawa, Ontario

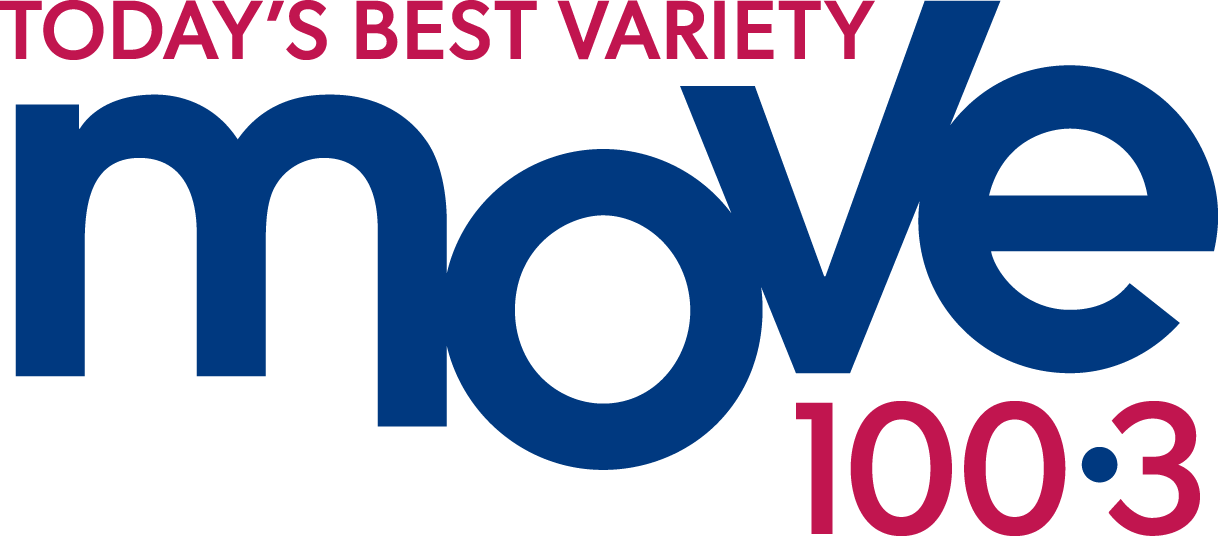
- Ottawa, Ontario; Canada
- Broadcast area: National Capital Region; Eastern Ontario; Western Quebec
- Frequency: 100.3 MHz (HD Radio)
- Branding: Move 100.3

Programming
- Format: Adult contemporary
- Subchannels: HD2: CFRA simulcast; HD3: CFGO simulcast
- Affiliations: Premiere Networks

Ownership
- Owner: Bell Media
- Sister stations: CFGO; CFRA; CKKL-FM; CJOH-DT; CHRO-TV

History
- First air date: August 12, 1991
- Call sign meaning: "Majic" (former branding)

Technical information
- Licensing authority: CRTC
- Class: C1
- ERP: 100,000 watts
- HAAT: 291 metres (955 ft)

Links
- Webcast: Listen live (via iHeartRadio); Listen live (via TuneIn)
- Website: www.moveradio.ca/ottawa.html

45°25′39.1″N 75°41′28.2″W

CJMJ-FM (100.3 FM) is a commercial radio station in Ottawa, Ontario, Canada. The station uses its on-air brand name Move 100, and airs an adult contemporary format. CJMJ is owned by Bell Media, along with three other Ottawa radio stations and two TV stations.

CJMJ's studios and offices are located in the Bell Media Building on George Street in Downtown Ottawa's ByWard Market, while its transmitter is located on the Ryan Tower in Camp Fortune, Quebec, within Gatineau Park.

CJMJ broadcasts in the HD Radio format. Its HD2 subchannel carries the news/talk programming of sister station CFRA, while co-owned sports radio station CFGO is heard on an HD3 subchannel.

== History ==
On November 9, 1989, Rawlco Communications, owner of CFGO, was granted a license for a new FM station. Rawlco proposed to use the frequency 92.1 MHz, but that conflicted with CBO-FM, located on 91.5 MHz. On April 5, 1991, Rawlco's application to use the 100.3 MHz frequency was granted. The station's effective radiated power (ERP) would be 80,000 watts.

On August 12, 1991, at 6:25 pm, the station signed on for the first time, with the official launch the following morning at 6 am. The first song on "Majic" was "Do You Believe in Magic" by The Lovin' Spoonful. On March 11, 1992, the station increased its power to 100,000 watts, with a transmitter on the Ryan Tower in Camp Fortune.

CJMJ was acquired by CHUM Limited in 1999. CHUM Ltd. was, in turn, acquired by CTVglobemedia in 2007, and Bell Media in 2011.

Despite the ownership changes, CJMJ's soft adult contemporary format helped it become one of the top stations in Ottawa for most of the 1990s.

In the early 2000s, CJMJ, like most AC stations, moved to a more upbeat direction. Around 2005, CJMJ was overtaken in the ratings by contemporary hit radio outlet CIHT-FM. CJMJ usually is ranked in the Top 5 Anglophone ratings for the Ottawa/Gatineau market according to BBM.

As of 2010, due to increased competition from adult contemporary station CJWL-FM (which leans towards soft adult contemporary content), CJMJ ended its longtime oldies show airing on Sunday mornings and added more upbeat hot adult contemporary songs to the playlist. All 1960s music and most 1970s titles have been dropped as of mid-2013. Mediabase and Nielsen BDS report the station on the Canadian AC panel.

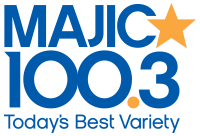
Former "Majic" logo (2012–2020)

On December 27, 2020, as part of a mass format reorganization by Bell Media, CJMJ rebranded as Move 100, ending almost 30 years of the "Majic" branding. While the station would run jockless for the first week of the format, on-air staff would return on January 4, 2021.

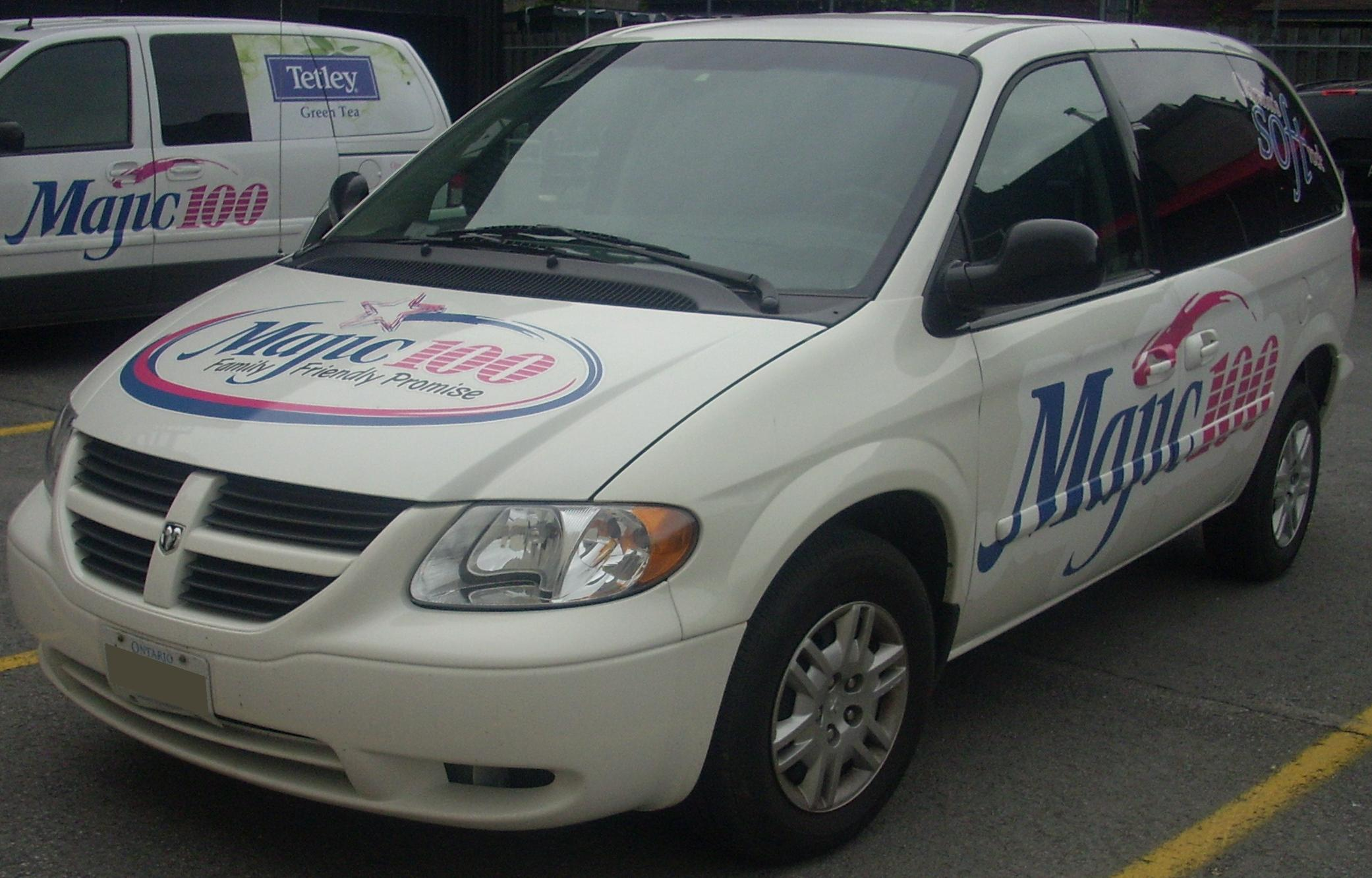
2005-07 Dodge Caravan from Majic 100

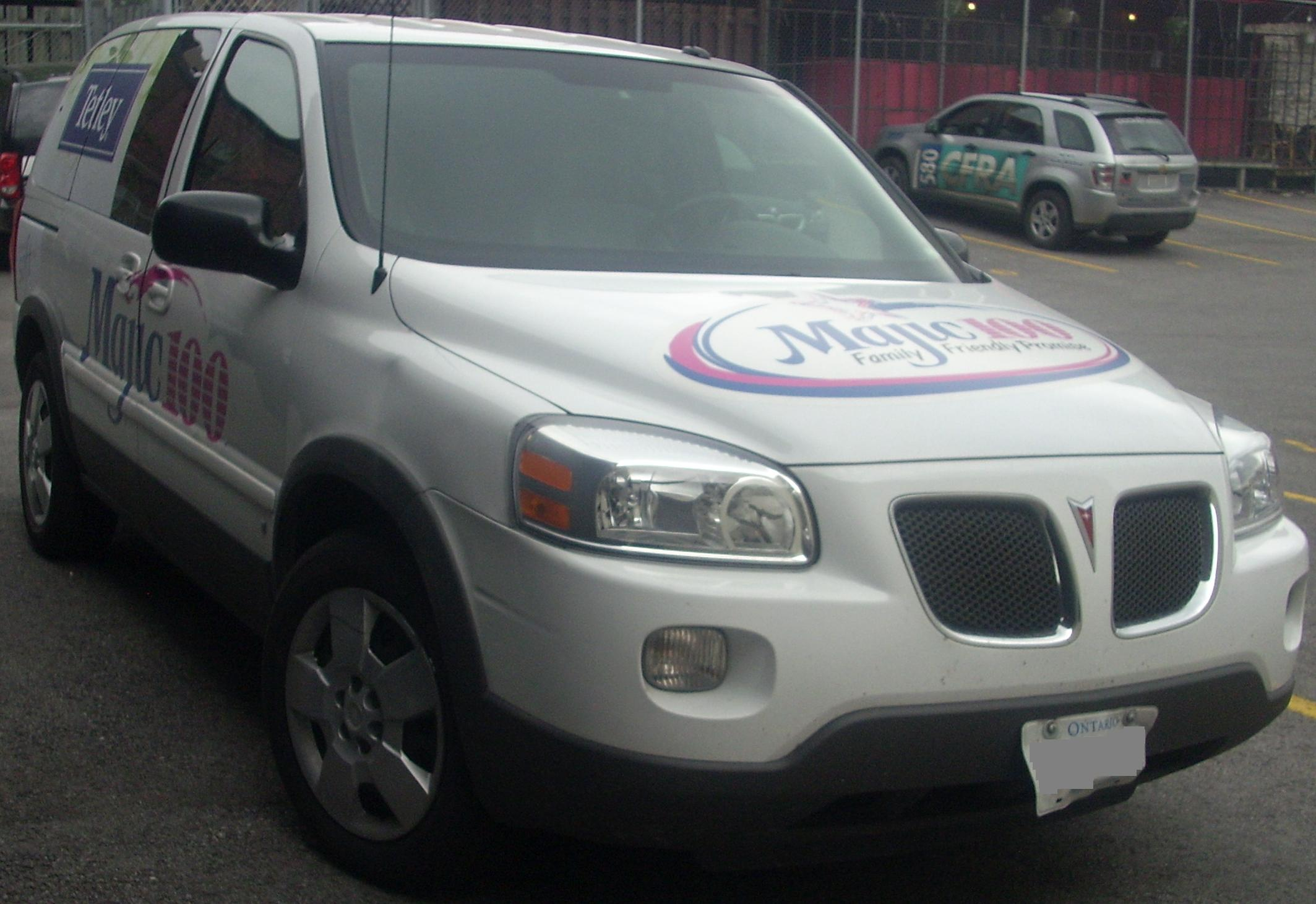
2006-09 Pontiac Montana SV6 SWB from Majic 100
