= CIMA-FM =

Radio station in Alliston, Ontario

Coordinates: 44.14890°N 79.87064°W

- Alliston, Ontario; Canada
- Broadcast area: South Simcoe County
- Frequency: 92.1 MHz
- Branding: 92.1 Indie FM

Programming
- Format: Adult contemporary/adult album alternative

Ownership
- Owner: Local Radio Lab Inc.

Technical information
- Class: A
- ERP: 1.986 kW
- HAAT: 30.5 metres (100 ft)

Links
- Website: southsimcoetoday.ca

CIMA-FM (92.1 FM, 92.1 Indie FM South Simcoe) is a radio station licensed to Alliston, Ontario. Owned by Local Radio Lab Inc., it broadcasts a hybrid adult contemporary/adult album alternative format targeting South Simcoe County.

My Broadcasting received approval for the new station from the CRTC on September 12, 2012. On August 30, 2013, CIMA began on-air tests. The station began regular broadcasting on September 19, 2013. The station was branded as 92.1 myFM.

Logo as FM 92 South Simcoe used from 2021-2025

On June 25, 2021, the CRTC approved the sale of CIMA to Local Radio Lab. The station was branded as FM 92 South Simcoe.

On December 1, 2025, Local Radio Lab rebranded the station to a hybrid adult contemporary and adult album alternative format. The branding "92.1 Indie FM" is similar to sister station CIND-FM Indie88 in Toronto, though the stations run distinct music playlists.
