= CKLC-FM =

Radio station in Kingston, Ontario

Coordinates: 44°12′36″N 76°25′05″W

- Kingston, Ontario; Canada
- Broadcast area: Eastern Ontario
- Frequency: 98.9 MHz
- Branding: Kingston's New Country 98.9

Programming
- Format: Country
- Affiliations: Dominion Network (1953–1962); Pure Country (2019–2025); Premiere Networks

Ownership
- Owner: My Broadcasting Corporation
- Sister stations: CFLY-FM, WLYK

History
- First air date: November 23, 1953
- Former frequencies: 1380 kHz (1953–2007)
- Call sign meaning: Kingston, Limestone City

Technical information
- Licensing authority: CRTC
- Class: B1
- ERP: 15,000 watts
- HAAT: 132.2 metres (434 ft)

Links
- Website: https://www.kingstondaily.ca

CKLC-FM (98.9 MHz) is a commercial radio station in Kingston, Ontario, Canada. It broadcasts a country format and is owned and operated by My Broadcasting Corporation which also owns sister station CFLY-FM.

The radio studios and offices are on Princess Street in Kingston. The transmitter is on Dawson Point Road on Wolfe Island.

== History ==
CKLC, along with its sister station CKLC-FM, began operations in 1953 at 1380 on the AM dial as an affiliate of the CBC's Dominion Network and remained with the network until it dissolved in 1962. The call letters are taken from Kingston's nickname, the "Limestone City". Some of its earliest alumni include newscaster Allan Saunders (Sandzelius), Al Boliska as morning man, and disk jockeys Buddy Guilfoyle and Ron Bertrand. The original station manager was John Bermingham.

In 2001, CKLC changed from its adult contemporary format in favour of a national sports radio network The Team. In August 2002, after just over a year on the air, then-owner CHUM Limited reversed their decision on the Team format and CKLC moved to an adult standards format as "All time favourites".

In April 2007, CKLC applied to move to the FM band at 98.9 MHz and was given approval by the CRTC on August 28, 2007.

CKLC-FM began broadcasting a test signal on 98.9 in October 2007, with an announcement that "Kingston's newest radio station" will be launching either "soon" or "in the weeks to come". The test signal included classic alternative rock music. The test announcements featured the voice of CHUM-FM's Darren B Lamb. On November 29, 2007, after a short test period, CKLC made the flip from AM to FM.

The new CKLC-FM tower was to be installed on the same land as the 1380 AM transmitter site located on Wolfe Island. Due to safety concerns, the construction could not commence on the new 500' FM tower while the 4 175' AM towers remained on and standing. So for the first several weeks on air, CKLC-FM broadcast from a temporary 1 kW transmitter on the old AM STL tower attached to the transmitter building. Once the main transmitter was completed, the station powered up to its full authorized power of 15,000 watts.

In 2007, CHUM Limited was acquired by CTVglobemedia (later Bell Media Radio). Before CHUM was purchased, the company had applied to the CRTC to convert CKLC to 98.9 MHz with an average effective radiated power of 8,700 watts. On August 28, the Commission approved that application.

Former logo as 98.9 The Drive (2007–2019)

On November 29, 2007, CKLC launched its FM signal and flipped from easy listening to alternative as 98.9 The Drive. CKLC 1380 left the air in December without ever simulcasting the new CKLC-FM. The AM had authorization to simulcast the FM for three months.

On May 27, 2019, CKLC started stunting with a wide range of music. The next day, the station flipped to country as Pure Country 99, joining all other Bell Media-owned country stations in adopting the "Pure Country" brand that day. In January 2020, the station attracted media attention when, in the midst of a controversy around the under-representation of women in country music, it committed to playing a 50/50 balance of male and female country artists for one week.

On February 8, 2024, Bell announced a restructuring that included the sale of 45 of its 103 radio stations to seven buyers, subject to approval by the CRTC, including CKLC, which was sold to My Broadcasting Corporation (MBC).

The sale to MBC was approved by the CRTC on February 26, 2025; on March 24, 2025, CKLC rebranded as Kingston's New Country 98.9 with no change in format. The rebranding was modelled after sister station CKYY-FM in Welland. Alongside the rebrand, Gary "Big G" McColman and Wayne "Matty" Mathews (who previously worked for Rogers-owned rival CKXC-FM) moved from sister station WLYK to become CKLC's new morning hosts.
