= CFMP-FM =

Radio station in Arnprior, Ontario

Coordinates: 45.4704°N 76.6815°W

- Arnprior, Ontario; Canada
- Frequency: 107.7 MHz (FM)
- Branding: 107.7 WOW FM

Programming
- Format: Classic hits

Ownership
- Owner: My Broadcasting Corporation

History
- First air date: 2005 (originally a rebroadcaster of CHMY-FM Renfrew)

Technical information
- ERP: 800 watts (2,500 watts maximum)
- HAAT: 107.7 metres (353 ft)

Links
- Webcast: Listen Live
- Website: arnpriortoday.ca

CFMP-FM (107.7 MHz) is a commercial FM radio station in Arnprior, Ontario. It broadcasts a classic hits format branded as 107.7 WOW FM. The station is owned and operated by My Broadcasting Corporation.

== History ==
The station originally began broadcasting as a repeater of CHMY-FM in Renfrew, as CHMY-FM-1 in 2005, in which My Broadcasting Corporation received approval from the CRTC to operate at 104.7 FM, later 107.7 MHz.

On April 2, 2014, My Broadcasting Corporation received approval from the CRTC to operate a new English-language FM radio station in Arnprior, which will operate at 107.7 FM and will replace CHMY-FM-1.

Undated, CHMY-FM-1 became CIMI-FM, and later CFMP-FM.

The CFMP-FM callsign was originally used at a radio station in Peterborough, which is now known as CKWF-FM.

The station originally had an adult contemporary format branded as 107.7 myFM with the slogan "Today's Soft Rock", on May 20, 2016, CFMP flipped to an oldies format branded as Oldies 107.7.

On July 27, 2026, the station flipped to classic hits as 107.7 Wow FM.
