= CJWV-FM =

Radio station in Peterborough, Ontario

- Peterborough, Ontario; Canada
- Broadcast area: Peterborough County
- Frequency: 96.7 MHz
- Branding: 96.7 WOW FM

Programming
- Format: Classic hits

Ownership
- Owner: My Broadcasting Corporation
- Sister stations: CJMB-FM

History
- First air date: May 11, 2011

Technical information
- Class: B
- ERP: 2.1 kW average 7 kW peak
- HAAT: 233 metres (764 ft)

Links
- Webcast: Listen Live
- Website: ptbotoday.ca

CJWV-FM (96.7 MHz) is a commercial radio station in Peterborough, Ontario. The station broadcasts a classic hits format, switching to Christmas music for part of November and December. It is owned by My Broadcasting Corporation and is branded as 96.7 WOW FM.

== History ==
Owned by Pineridge Broadcasting, the station was authorized on May 8, 2008. Corus Entertainment's CKRU-FM had also applied to use the 96.7 MHz frequency, but had to select a different FM frequency (100.5 MHz).

On May 11, 2011, the station signed on the air as Magic 96.7 with an adult contemporary format. The CJWV-FM call sign was formerly used at a radio station in Winnipeg, Manitoba. CJWV-FM's morning program was hosted by broadcaster Dan Duran and actress Linda Kash.

On September 1, 2015, CJWV was purchased by My Broadcasting Corporation as part of the acquisition of Pineridge Broadcasting Inc. On September 2, 2015, CJWV flipped to an oldies format as Oldies 96.7. The station eventually evolved into classic hits.

OLDIES 96.7 logo used from 2015-2026

On July 27, 2026, CJWV re-branded to 96.7 Wow FM while retaining the classic hits format.
