= Media in Vancouver =

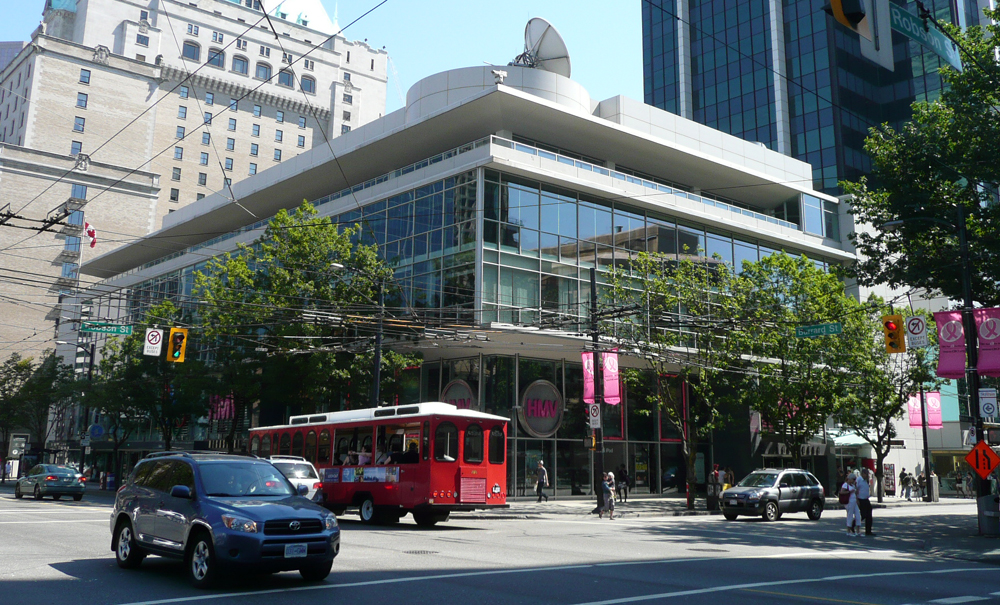
750 Burrard Street on the northeast corner of Burrard and Robson Street in Downtown Vancouver. The building serves as the headquarters for CTV Vancouver.

This is an overview of media in Vancouver, British Columbia.

== Major newspapers ==
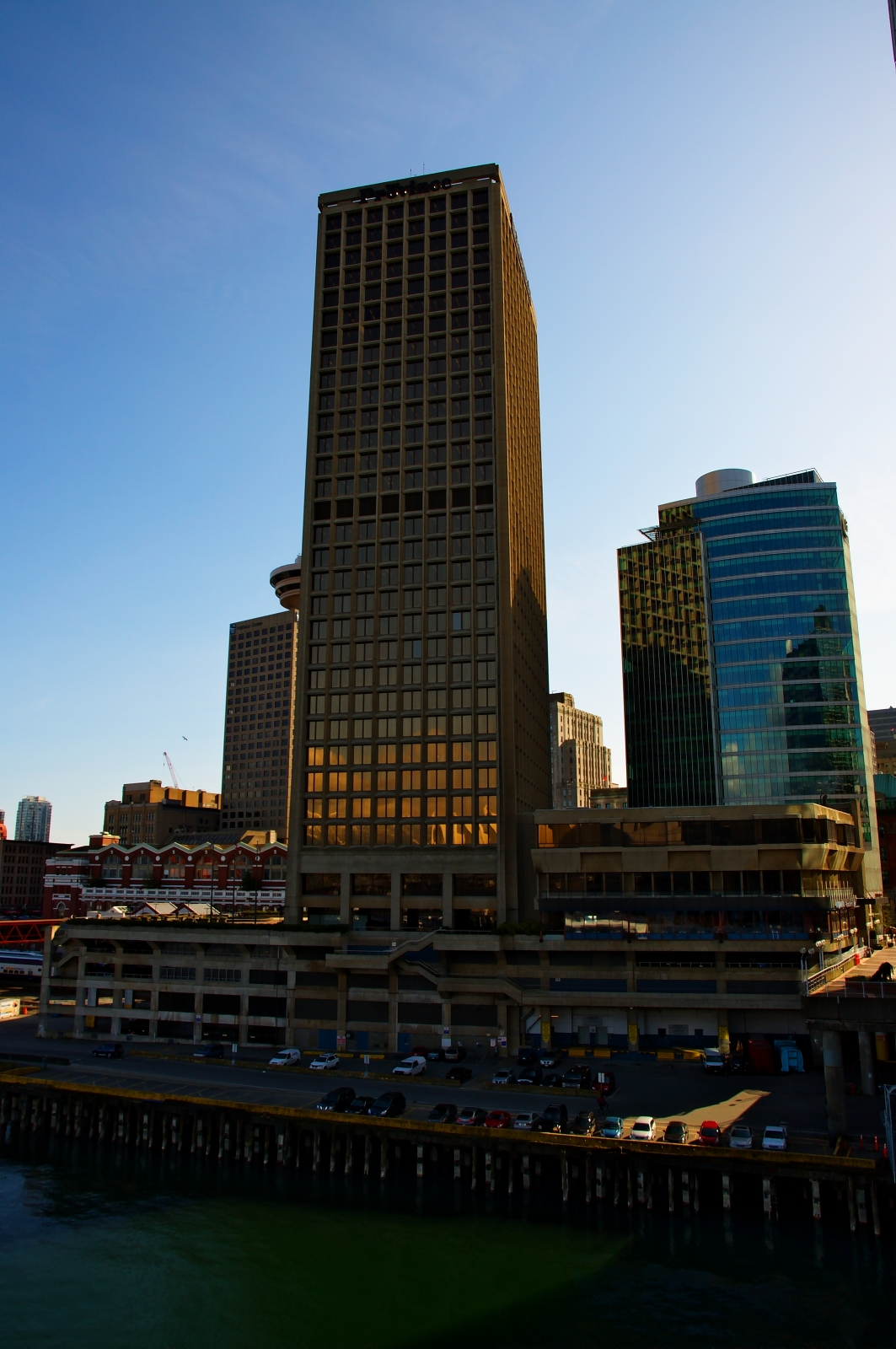
Vancouver's two major daily newspapers, The Vancouver Sun and The Province, are both headquartered at Granville Square.

Vancouver has two major English-language daily newspapers, The Vancouver Sun (a broadsheet) and The Province (a tabloid). Both are published by Postmedia Network. There are also two national newspapers distributed in the city: The Globe and Mail, which began distribution of a "national edition" into B.C. in 1983, and in more recent years launched a three-page B.C. news section in an effort to increase its readership in the city. The National Post, also owned by Postmedia, entered city markets only in the last few years but has very little British Columbia content.

Vancouver has four Chinese-language daily newspapers, Ming Pao, Sing Tao, World Journal and The Epoch Times. Ming Pao and Sing Tao cater to a Cantonese-speaking readership whereas World Journal and The Epoch Times target Mandarin speakers.

Vancouver business publications include the following:

- BC Business Mag (monthly)
- Business Edge Vancouver (weekly)
- Business in Vancouver (weekly)
- Journal of Commerce BC (daily)
- Make It Business (monthly)
- Western Investor (monthly)

One free daily newspaper, Metro is published in the city from Monday to Friday. It contains a small number of local news stories.

The Georgia Straight is a weekly "alternative" newspaper, though in addition to left-leaning news and opinion it also features upscale advertising for products such as condominiums and has lifestyle articles on topics such as health and style. Its most extensive sections are focused on entertainment and music features and listings. The Georgia Straight began as a counterculture newspaper in the 1960s, full of controversial politics and occasional "obscene" cartoons and pictures, including the hippie classic comic Harold Hedd. During this period the Straight's owner and publisher, Dan MacLeod, was repeatedly harassed by the city and its anti-hippie mayor Tom Campbell. During the 1970s MacLeod converted the publication to a much more entertainment-oriented publication, avoiding political content until the mid-1980s.

The Post Group Multimedia publishes 3 weekly newspapers: The Asian Pacific Post (Chinese), South Asian Post (Indo-Canadian), and The Filipino Post, for the three largest immigrant communities in the Lower Mainland.

The Express is the title used for an occasional union-published newspaper published by the press unions when they are on strike.

=== Neighbourhood newspapers ===
Newspaper	Language	Publication frequency
24H (Vancouver edition)	English	Ceased publication 2017
The Indo-Canadian Voice	English	Weekly, free, English
The Awaaz Newspaper	English	Weekly, free, Punjabi
The Canadian Immigrant	English	Monthly, free
Discorder	English	Monthly, free
Filipino Post	English	Weekly, free, Filipino
The Georgia Straight	English	Weekly, free
Good News Weekly	English	Weekly, free
Jornal Brasil Vancouver	Portuguese	Daily, free, Metro Vancouver
La Source / The Source	French and English	Bi-weekly, free, bilingual
L'Express du Pacifique	French	Bi-weekly; ceased publication 2011
Ming Pao (Vancouver edition)	Chinese	Daily; ceased publication January 2026
Metro (Vancouver edition)	English	Ceased publication 2019
North Shore News	English	Weekly, free, North & West Vancouver
The Peak	English	Weekly free Simon Fraser University student newspaper
The Province	English	Daily, except Saturday
The Republic	English	Ceased publication 2009. Formerly bi-weekly, free
Sing Tao (Vancouver edition)	Chinese	Daily
South Asian Post	English	Weekly, free, Indo-Canadian / Pakistani
The Epoch Times (Vancouver edition)	Chinese	Daily, free
The Ubyssey	English	Biweekly free University of British Columbia student newspaper
Vancouver Courier	English	Ceased publication September 2020
Vancouver Sun	English	Daily, except Sunday
Voice	Chinese	Weekly, free, and online
WestEnder	English	Weekly, free, ceased publication 2017
World Journal (Vancouver edition)	Chinese	Daily

== Radio ==
There are two main news radio stations in Vancouver: CBC Radio One and CKNW. There are several other talk and information stations, primarily on the AM band, and a variety of music stations, mostly on FM.

In addition, there are four campus and community licensed radio stations in the Vancouver market. CJSF-FM (SFU's Burnaby campus), CITR-FM (UBC's main campus), and CFML (BCIT's Burnaby campus) are staffed by students from their respective schools. CFRO (Vancouver Coop Radio) is located in Vancouver's Downtown Eastside. CJSF, CITR, and CFRO are members of the National Campus and Community Radio Association.

Frequency	Call sign	Branding	Format	Owner	Notes
AM 600	CKSP	Sher E Punjab	Multicultural	Sher E Punjab	
AM 650	CISL	Sportsnet 650	Sports	Rogers Media	Signed off the air permanently on July 7, 2026
AM 690	CBU	CBC Radio One	News/talk	Canadian Broadcasting Corporation	
AM 730	CKNW	AM 730	News/talk	Corus Entertainment	
AM 1040	CKST	Funny 1040	Comedy	Bell Media	Signed off the air permanently on June 14, 2023
AM 1130	CKWX	1130 NewsRadio	All-news	Rogers Media	Signed off the air permanently on July 7, 2026
AM 1200	CJRJ	Spice Radio	Multicultural	IT Productions	
AM 1320	CHMB	AM1320 CHMB	Multicultural	Mainstream Broadcasting Corporation	
AM 1410	CFTE	BNN Bloomberg Radio 1410	Business news	Bell Media	Signed off the air permanently on June 14, 2023
AM 1470	CJVB	Fairchild Radio	Multicultural	Fairchild Radio	Signed off the air permanently on March 2, 2026
AM 1550	KRPI	Sher E Punjab	Multicultural	BBC Broadcasting	Licensed to Ferndale, Washington, United States, studios are in Richmond
AM 1600	KVRI	Radio India	Multicultural	Multicultural Broadcasting	Licensed to Blaine, Washington, United States, studios are in Surrey
FM 88.1	CBU-2-FM	CBC Radio One	News/talk	Canadian Broadcasting Corporation	FM translator for CBU 690 AM
FM 88.7	VE7NWR	CHNW	Emergency information		Licensed to New Westminster
FM 88.9	VF2521		Tourist information	Cameron Bell Consultancy	Licensed to Surrey
FM 89.3	CFVT-FM	Vancouver Tourist Radio	Tourist information	Paul Sander	
FM 90.1	CJSF-FM	CJSF 90.1 FM	Campus radio	Simon Fraser University	
FM 90.9	CBUX-FM	Ici Musique	Public music	Canadian Broadcasting Corporation	French
FM 93.1	CKYE-FM	Red FM	Multicultural	South Asian Broadcasting Corporation	
FM 93.7	CJJR-FM	JRfm	Country music	Jim Pattison Group	
FM 94.5	CFBT-FM	94.5 Virgin Radio	Contemporary hit radio	Bell Media	
FM 95.3	CKZZ-FM	Z95.3	Hot adult contemporary	Stingray Radio	
FM 96.1	CHKG-FM	Fairchild Radio	Multicultural	Fairchild Radio	
FM 96.9	CJAX-FM	Jack 96.9	Adult hits	Rogers Media	
FM 97.7	CBUF-FM	Ici Radio-Canada Première	News/talk	Canadian Broadcasting Corporation	French
FM 98.3	CIWV-FM	Wave 98.3	Smooth jazz/rhythmic AC	Durham Radio	Serves Vancouver
FM 98.7	CKPM-FM	CKPM 98.7	Adult album alternative	McBride Communications & Media	Serves Tri-Cities
FM 99.3	CFOX-FM	The World Famous CFOX	Active rock	Corus Entertainment	
FM 100.5	CFRO-FM	Co-op Radio	Community radio	Vancouver Cooperative Radio	
FM 101.1	CFMI-FM	Rock 101	Mainstream rock	Corus Entertainment	Licensed to New Westminster
FM 101.9	CITR-FM	CITR 101.9	Campus radio	University of British Columbia	
FM 102.7	CKPK-FM	102.7 Now Radio	Hot adult contemporary	Jim Pattison Group	
FM 103.5	CHQM-FM	Move 103.5	Adult contemporary	Bell Media	
FM 104.3	CHLG-FM	The Breeze	Soft adult contemporary	Stingray Radio	
FM 104.9	CKKS-FM-2	Kiss West Coast	Contemporary hit radio	Rogers Media	
FM 105.7	CBU-FM	CBC Music	Public music	Canadian Broadcasting Corporation	
FM 107.7	CISF-FM	107.7 Pulse FM	Adult contemporary	South Fraser Broadcasting	Serves Surrey
FM 107.9	CFML-FM	Evolution 107.9	Campus radio	British Columbia Institute of Technology	

In addition, both KARI from Blaine, Washington (AM 550), and KWPZ from Lynden, Washington (FM 106.5), are usually considered part of the Vancouver radio market; KARI and KWPZ both maintain offices in Vancouver.

=== Internet radio ===
Frequency	Branding	Format	Owner	Notes
Internet only	CBC Radio 3	Canadian indie music	CBC	Is primarily broadcast from Vancouver
Internet only	Gurbani Kirtan	Multilingual	Online Shabad Gurbani Kirtan 24/7	Punjabi
Internet only	La Bonita X101	Spanish adult hits	SAGO Communications	
Internet only	LG73	Classic soul, contemporary hits, and eclectic mix		www.lg73.ca
Internet only	Ritmo X99	Spanish CHR	SAGO Communications	

== Television ==
Vancouver is the third-largest television market in Canada, and the largest in western Canada. It is also the second-largest television production centre in North America after Los Angeles.

Global BC is the most popular evening newscast in the city, though CTV Vancouver, currently second in the ratings, has aggressively been trying to increase its market share — including the purchasing of a news helicopter known as 'Chopper 9'. In 2006, Global BC launched the Global One traffic helicopter for live traffic updates and breaking news. CBC also has local newscasts though they are far back in the ratings.

OTA virtual channel (PSIP)	OTA channel	Rogers Cable	Telus TV	Delta Cable	Call sign	Network	Notes
2.1	35 (UHF)	102	100	3	CBUT-DT	CBC Television	
6.1	16 (UHF)	109	121	6	CHEK-DT	Independent/Yes TV	Transmitted from Victoria
8.1	22 (UHF)	101	104	11	CHAN-DT	Global	
10.1	33 (UHF)	103	106	13	CKVU-DT	Citytv	
12.1	14 (UHF)	–	–	–	KVOS-TV	Univision	KVOS-TV and its subchannels are transmitted from Bellingham, Washington; station is targeted at Canadian audiences and maintains sales office in Vancouver; subchannels 12.3 and 12.8 are KVOS-TV’s simulcasts of the MeTV and H&I networks from KFFV in Seattle, Washington.
12.2	14 (UHF)	–	–	–	KVOS-TV	Movies!	KVOS-TV and its subchannels are transmitted from Bellingham, Washington; station is targeted at Canadian audiences and maintains sales office in Vancouver; subchannels 12.3 and 12.8 are KVOS-TV’s simulcasts of the MeTV and H&I networks from KFFV in Seattle, Washington.
12.3	14 (UHF)	157	141	52	KVOS-TV	MeTV	KVOS-TV and its subchannels are transmitted from Bellingham, Washington; station is targeted at Canadian audiences and maintains sales office in Vancouver; subchannels 12.3 and 12.8 are KVOS-TV’s simulcasts of the MeTV and H&I networks from KFFV in Seattle, Washington.
12.4	14 (UHF)	–	–	–	KVOS-TV	Catchy Comedy	KVOS-TV and its subchannels are transmitted from Bellingham, Washington; station is targeted at Canadian audiences and maintains sales office in Vancouver; subchannels 12.3 and 12.8 are KVOS-TV’s simulcasts of the MeTV and H&I networks from KFFV in Seattle, Washington.
12.5	14 (UHF)	–	–	–	KVOS-TV	Start TV	KVOS-TV and its subchannels are transmitted from Bellingham, Washington; station is targeted at Canadian audiences and maintains sales office in Vancouver; subchannels 12.3 and 12.8 are KVOS-TV’s simulcasts of the MeTV and H&I networks from KFFV in Seattle, Washington.
12.6	14 (UHF)	–	–	–	KVOS-TV	MeTV Plus	KVOS-TV and its subchannels are transmitted from Bellingham, Washington; station is targeted at Canadian audiences and maintains sales office in Vancouver; subchannels 12.3 and 12.8 are KVOS-TV’s simulcasts of the MeTV and H&I networks from KFFV in Seattle, Washington.
12.7	14 (UHF)	–	–	–	KVOS-TV	Story Television	KVOS-TV and its subchannels are transmitted from Bellingham, Washington; station is targeted at Canadian audiences and maintains sales office in Vancouver; subchannels 12.3 and 12.8 are KVOS-TV’s simulcasts of the MeTV and H&I networks from KFFV in Seattle, Washington.
12.8	14 (UHF)	–	–	–	KVOS-TV	Heroes & Icons	KVOS-TV and its subchannels are transmitted from Bellingham, Washington; station is targeted at Canadian audiences and maintains sales office in Vancouver; subchannels 12.3 and 12.8 are KVOS-TV’s simulcasts of the MeTV and H&I networks from KFFV in Seattle, Washington.
12.9	14 (UHF)	–	–	–	KVOS-TV	MeTV Toons	KVOS-TV and its subchannels are transmitted from Bellingham, Washington; station is targeted at Canadian audiences and maintains sales office in Vancouver; subchannels 12.3 and 12.8 are KVOS-TV’s simulcasts of the MeTV and H&I networks from KFFV in Seattle, Washington.
24.1	19 (UHF)	–	–	–	KBCB	Tri-State Christian Television	Transmitted from Bellingham, Washington
24.2	19 (UHF)	–	–	–	KBCB	Sonlife Broadcasting Network	Transmitted from Bellingham, Washington
24.3	19 (UHF)	–	–	–	KBCB	Newsmax TV	Transmitted from Bellingham, Washington
24.4	19 (UHF)	–	–	–	KBCB	Shop LC	Transmitted from Bellingham, Washington
26.1	26 (UHF)	801	2001	7	CBUFT-DT	Ici Radio-Canada Télé	Vancouver's only French language station
28.1	18 (UHF)	–	–	–	K24IC-D	PBS	Transmitted from Seattle, Washington
28.2	18 (UHF)	–	–	–	K24IC-D	NHK World-Japan	Transmitted from Seattle, Washington
28.3	18 (UHF)	–	–	–	K24IC-D	FNX	Transmitted from Seattle, Washington
28.4	18 (UHF)	–	–	–	K24IC-D	TVW	Transmitted from Seattle, Washington
32.1	32 (UHF)	104	101	9	CIVT-DT	CTV	
42.1	20 (UHF)	106	119	8	CHNM-DT	Omni Television	
53.1	23 (UHF)	108	102	12	CIVI-DT	CTV 2	Transmitted from Victoria
66.1	24 (UHF)	107	123	4	CHNU-DT	Independent/Yes TV	
–	–	110	117	5	–	Knowledge Network	Provincial educational broadcaster
–	–	253	845	694	–	Global News: BC 1	
–	–	907	2801	940	–	Fairchild TV	
–	–	905	2831	941	–	Talentvision	
–	–	105	–	–	–	Shaw Multicultural Channel	Multicultural community channel for Shaw Cable subscribers
–	–	910	2863	–	–	New Tang Dynasty	
–	–	2539	2828	–	–	WOWtv	
–	–	–	–	10	–	Delta TV	Community channel for Delta Cable subscribers

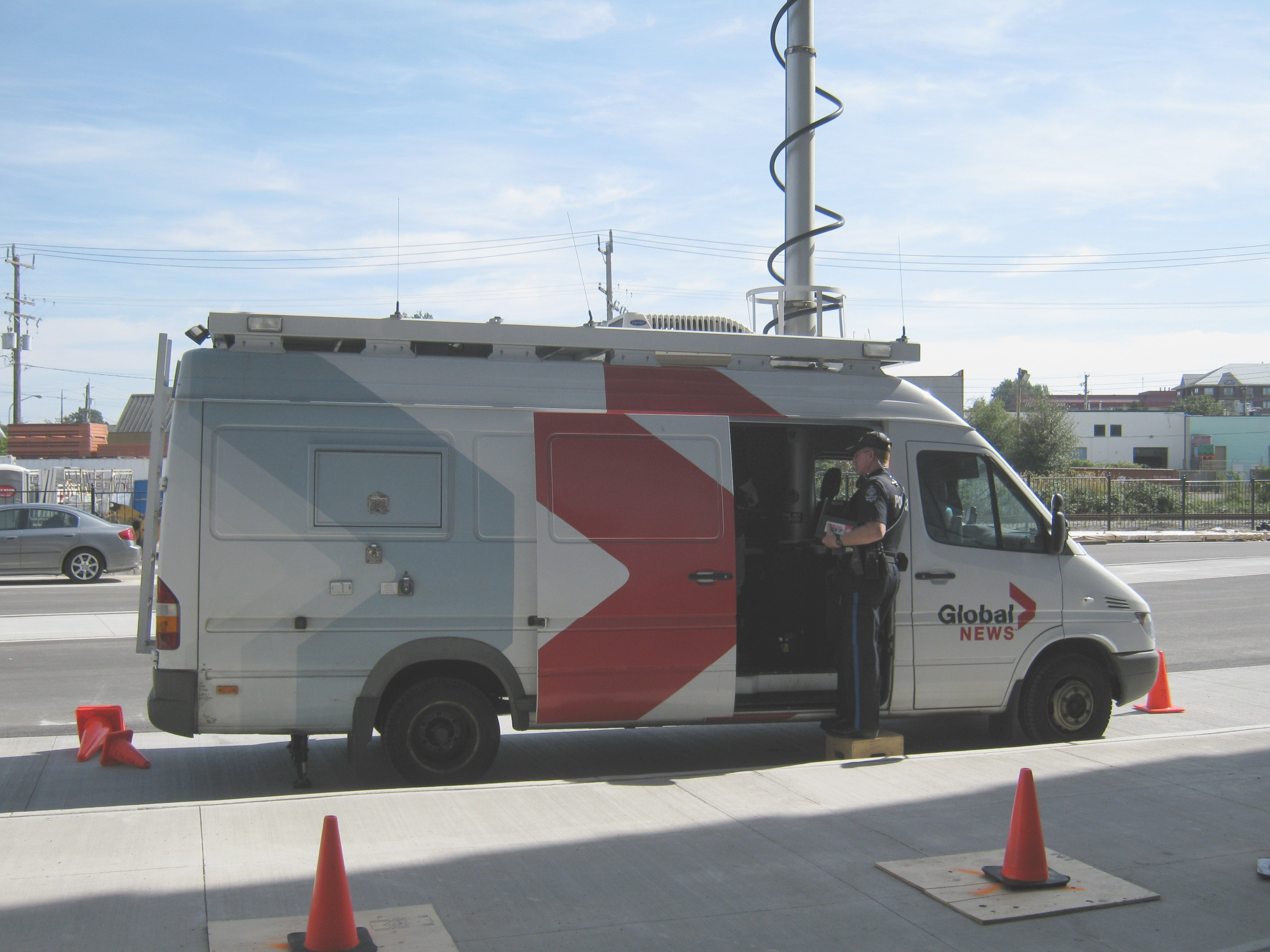
A Global BC microwave ENG van

Vancouver (and London, Ontario) were the first two cities in Canada to be served by cable television, in 1952.

Rogers Cable provides service to Vancouver and most of the Lower Mainland. Shaw Communications formerly provided cable service from 2000 until 2023, when its Lower Mainland cable systems were reacquired by Rogers Communications in a merger. Telus TV also offers satellite television and IPTV service throughout most of Vancouver and the Lower Mainland. The suburb of Delta is served by Delta Cable, a subsidiary of the Halifax-based telecommunications company Eastlink.

Other over-the-air television stations licensed to Bellingham, Washington, that are available terrestrially in Vancouver but not carried on cable are KBCB (channel 24), a Tri-State Christian Television owned-and-operated station on channel 24.1 along with the Sonlife Broadcasting Network on subchannel 24.2; and K24IC-D (channel 28.1), a rebroadcaster of PBS station KBTC-TV from Tacoma, Washington.

American network affiliates on Vancouver cable are piped in from Seattle, Washington, including KOMO (ABC), KING (NBC), KIRO (CBS), KCTS (PBS) and KCPQ (Fox), along with independent station KSTW. Vancouver and Seattle roughly equal in terms of market size.

== Magazines ==
- Boulevard Magazine, a west coast luxury lifestyle magazine serving the Chinese-speaking communities of Metro Vancouver, published monthly in English and in Chinese.
- Business in Vancouver (BIV) is a weekly business news journal
- HUSH Magazine, a bi-monthly social commentary and lifestyle magazine for 25- to 40-year-olds, distributed to Downtown Vancouver
- Kinesis, a 1974 to 2001 magazine
- Megaphone Magazine, sharing stories that explore social justice, culture, politics, and independent arts in Vancouver and Victoria.
- MONTECRISTO Magazine, a lifestyle quarterly for discerning Vancouverites, published four times a year
- Resource World Magazine, a bi-monthly magazine distributed in 46 countries that reports on the business of mining and green technologies
- Vancouver Magazine, a lifestyle magazine with some news features, published 10 times a year
- What's in Magazine, a Chinese lifestyle magazine for new trends in the Asian community, published once a month
- WestCoast Families, a family lifestyle magazine, published 6 times a year, plus specialty issues.

== Online media ==
- BC Buzz with Dave Michael Garg, online TV & magazine outlet focused on the environment
- Cambie Report, local politics podcast
- Daily Hive (formerly Vancity Buzz), local news and lifestyle outlet
- HUSH Magazine, an editorial platform for lifestyle, social commentary and entertainment
- LifeVancouver, Japanese news and events site
- Jornal Brasil Vancouver, Brazilian community newspaper, events, classified ads and directory website
- PolitiCoast, provincial politics podcast
- Taiyangbao, a Chinese-language news website produced in association with The Vancouver Sun newspaper
- The Tyee, alternative news site
- Vancouver Desi, a South Asian news portal produced in association with The Province newspaper
- The Vancouver Observer, alternative local news site
- Vancouver Weekly, alternative news weekly site
- VIES Magazine, independent entertainment magazine in Vancouver, B.C. with focus on music, sports, food and beverage
- The West End Journal, independent online community website serving Vancouver's West End / Coal Harbour neighbourhoods

== Media ownership ==
Vancouver has some of the most concentrated media ownership in all of Canada. The Vancouver Sun, The Province, the National Post, and 12 community newspapers are all owned by Postmedia Network. Partly in response to that concentration, a group of journalists — many of them ex-Sun employees — started up an online news publication, The Tyee, that posts news and opinion pieces on a nearly daily basis.

== Ethnic media ==
As of the 2000s there were various formats of media catering to ethnic minorities. They included 80 newspapers, 24 magazines, 15 television stations, 15 radio stations, and 10 printed business directories and online publications. Daniel Ahadi and Catherine A. Murray, the authors of "Urban Mediascapes and Multicultural Flows: Assessing Vancouver’s Communication Infrastructure," wrote that publication turnover, or the creation and failure and publications, was very high.

== See also ==
- Hollywood North
