= CJRC =

Radio station in Manitoba, Canada

Coordinates: 49.7994°N 97.2750°W

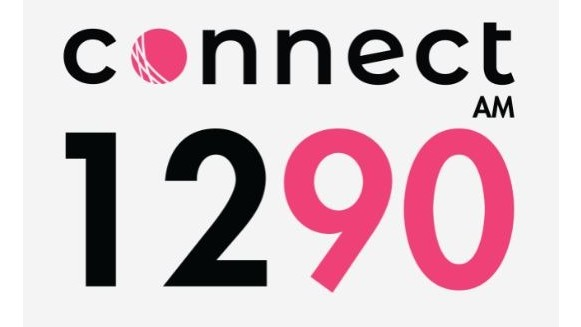
- Winnipeg, Manitoba; Canada
- Broadcast area: Winnipeg Metropolitan Region
- Frequency: 1290 kHz
- Branding: Connect 1290

Programming
- Format: Multilingual

Ownership
- Owner: Akash Broadcasting Inc.

History
- First air date: November 1, 1963
- Former call signs: CJQM (1963–1969); CIFX (1987–2000); CFST (2000–2003); CFRW (1969-1987, 2003-2026)
- Former frequencies: 1470 kHz (1963–1976)

Technical information
- Licensing authority: CRTC
- Class: B
- Power: 10,000 watts

Links
- Website: connectfm.ca

CJRC (1290 AM) is a radio station in Winnipeg, Manitoba, Canada. Owned by Akash Broadcasting. Its transmitter is located near Oak Bluff along Road 54 off McGillivray Boulevard.

== History ==
=== Early years ===
On November 1, 1963, the station first signed on as CJQM. At the same time, FM sister station CJQM-FM also came on the air. The two stations simulcast an easy listening format. CJQM-AM-FM were owned by Winnipeg Broadcast Associates Ltd. (a division of Vancouver Broadcast Associates, the original owners of CHQM and CHQM-FM in Vancouver). CJQM originally broadcast on 1470 kHz with 5,000 watts.

Winnipeg Broadcast Associates sold both stations in 1965 to QM Winnipeg Ltd., which was later purchased by Radio Winnipeg Ltd. The call signs changed to CFRW and CFRW-FM (94.3 MHz) in 1969. Jim Pattison's CJOR Ltd. (the owner of Vancouver station CJOR) bought CFRW-AM-FM from the bankrupt Radio Winnipeg in 1970.

=== Top 40 CFRW ===
CFRW-AM-FM were purchased by CHUM Ltd. in 1974. CHUM got CFRW's frequency changed on June 13, 1977, to 1290 AM, and branding itself 13CFRW. The move provided a better signal, doubling the power to 10,000 watts. CHUM management also had the studios and office relocated. The station moved from the Confederation Building at 457 Main Street to the same studio across the street previously used by CKY. Meanwhile, CKY relocated to new studios in Polo Park. CFRW re-branded itself as 13 CFRW on June 13, 1977, airing a Top 40/CHR format.

Some notable personalities during the CHUM ownership years include Ron Able, Gary Christian, Dick Reeves, Tim "Trucker" Bradley, KC Foxxe, Ralph "Racoon" Carney, Franc Cappozolo, Lee Marshall, Stu Ferguson, Pat Cardinal, and Steve Jackson. Al Gibson was News Director with notables such as Byron Scott, George Gordon (formerly at CFTR Toronto), Tom Mark (formerly at CKNW Vancouver), and Jeff Murray (Feldman) as sports director. Bob Laine (popular disc jockey in CHUM's heyday, now deceased) was transferred to CFRW from CHUM to be station manager. Other notable on-air staff included Dan Williams, Larry Hennessey, Roger Kelly (Roger Kettyls), Eric Gordon, Al Stewart, Frank Roberts (Traffic), and Brian Stone (News).

From 1983 to 1991, the station was the radio broadcaster for Winnipeg Blue Bombers football, with play-by-play voices Ron Oakes, Mike Inglis, and Robb Glazier. From 1985 until 1987, Casey Kasem's American Top 40 was heard on CFRW.

=== 1980s and 90s ===
CFRW played a contemporary music format until 1987, when it switched to soft rock, with a call sign and branding change to 1290 Fox CIFX. The station changed formats several more times, including to talk radio on May 8, 1995, and to adult standards in 1999.

On May 7, 2001, the station flipped to an all-sports format. It was one of several CHUM Ltd. stations in the now-defunct network known as "The Team", which only lasted one year.

=== Oldies ===
The CFRW call sign and oldies format returned in August 2002, competing with CKY in the format before that station moved to the FM dial and changed to a soft adult contemporary format in 2004 as CKY-FM. CFRW aired all games of the Winnipeg Goldeyes baseball team from 2005 to 2013.

In 2007, CFRW, along with the other CHUM stations, were sold to CTVglobemedia.

=== Return to sports ===
CFRW returned to an all-sports format as Sports Radio 1290 on September 27, 2010. Much of its programming at the outset was provided by ESPN Radio, though it also carried the syndicated Jim Rome Show. However, since the station's relaunch, the station has progressively added original programming, including shows that originated from other Canadian sports radio stations, such as the Illegal Curve Hockey Show and Hustler & Lawless.

Three months later, CTVglobemedia relaunched the oldies/classic hits format on co-owned CHIQ-FM. CTVglobemedia was merged into Bell Media in 2011, which put CFRW under Bell Media ownership.

Logo as TSN 1290, 2011-2021

On July 21, 2011, the Winnipeg Free Press reported that Bell Media had reached a deal for broadcast rights with the Winnipeg Jets for both television and radio coverage of the NHL team. TSN became its television broadcaster and CFRW became the official flagship radio station of the Jets. Since 2015, CFRW had also been the radio and online broadcaster for the Manitoba Moose, the Jets' American Hockey League affiliate.

On October 5, 2011, CFRW was re-branded as part of the TSN Radio network, becoming TSN Radio 1290.

=== Switch to comedy, shutoff ===
Logo as Funny, 2021-2023

On October 5, 2020, the Jets announced that they would move to CJOB and CJKR-FM. On February 9, 2021, Bell Media ended the TSN Radio formats at CFRW and sister stations CKOC in Hamilton, and CKST in Vancouver. After stunting with music for three days, the station flipped to Bell Media's "Funny" comedy format on February 12, 2021.

On March 4, 2021, the station announced a return of sports content by assuming rights to the Winnipeg Ice of the Western Hockey League beginning with the 2021 season, rescinding a five-year deal with CJOB.

On June 14, 2023, two days before the Ice announced their relocation to the United States as the Wenatchee Wild and as part of a mass corporate restructuring at Bell Media, the company shut down 6 of their AM radio stations nationwide, including CFRW. The station ended regular programming at 10 a.m. that day, replaced with a looped message about the impending shutdown, which lasted until the completion of the signoff.

=== Sale to Akash Broadcasting ===
In May 2024, Akash Broadcasting–owner of multilingual stations CKER-FM Edmonton and CJCN-FM Surrey—filed an application to acquire CFRW and Calgary sister station CKMX from Bell Media. The sale of CFRW was approved by the CRTC in October 2025, but the CKMX purchase was denied.

In March 2026, the station relaunched as Connect 1290 under the new call letters CJRC. The new format primarily serves Winnipeg's East Indian community, featuring locally-produced news, talk, and music programming in the Punjabi and English languages.
