= CJSF =

CJSF may refer to:

- CJSF-FM, a radio station at Simon Fraser University in Burnaby, British Columbia
- California Junior Scholarship Federation, a subdivision of the California Scholarship Federation
