= Jonny Staub =

Canadian radio & TV personality (born 1979)

Jonny Staub (born November 28, 1979, in Windsor, Ontario) is a Canadian radio and television personality.

Staub started his career as a traffic reporter at CHYM-FM in Kitchener, ON, on May 15, 1997. He attended Conestoga College and has achieved success mainly in Western Canada, both in Top 40 radio and for TV stations Citytv and Shaw TV.

== Career ==
In 2001, at age 22, he was the youngest DJ in a major time slot in the Vancouver market. He was removed from his position at Z95 in May 2002. Soon after, he landed a weekend time slot at Power 92 in Edmonton. In 2005, he was a featured host for the newly airing Edmonton station The Bounce.

He has been a DJ at CHYM-FM, CKGL, CJIB, CKIK-FM, CKZZ-FM (in the evening time), CKNG-FM, CHBN-FM, and CFBT-FM.

Staub is also one of Canada's first openly gay DJs in the Vancouver radio market. In 2008 he co-hosted OUTtv's Let's Talk Sex, which also airs on its US counterpart here!. There is talk of a second season of Let's Talk Sex; however, there is no word on whether or not Staub will return to that show. Recently Jonny has ventured online and started blogging on Homorazzi.com, a site where 'homos judge everything' - think Perez Hilton meets The Hills. As part of the Homorazzi.com team, Jonny hosts weekly segments called "Hawt Topics".
