= CKKS-FM =

Radio station in Chilliwack, British Columbia

- Chilliwack, British Columbia; Canada
- Broadcast area: Greater Vancouver; Fraser Valley
- Frequency: 107.5 MHz
- Branding: Kiss West Coast

Programming
- Format: Gold-based CHR
- Affiliations: Vancouver Canucks

Ownership
- Owner: Rogers Radio; (Rogers Media, Inc.)
- Sister stations: CKSR-FM, CJAX-FM, CKQC-FM, CKVU-DT, CHNM-DT

History
- First air date: October 1, 1986
- Former call signs: CKSR-FM (1986–1999); CKVX-FM (2000–2004); CKCL-FM (2004–2009); CFUN-FM (2009–2015)
- Call sign meaning: Sounds like "kiss" (branding)

Technical information
- Class: A
- ERP: 640 watts (peak); 303 watts (average) horizontal polarization only
- HAAT: 210.1 metres (689 ft)
- Transmitter coordinates: 49.11005°N 121.846396°W
- Repeaters: CKKS-FM-1 92.5 Abbotsford; CKKS-FM-2 104.9 Vancouver

Links
- Website: seekyoursounds.com/radio/kisswestcoast

CKKS-FM (107.5 FM, "Kiss West Coast") is a radio station licensed to Chilliwack, British Columbia, and serving Greater Vancouver and the Fraser Valley. Owned by Rogers Radio, a division of Rogers Sports & Media, it broadcasts a gold-based contemporary hit radio format.

The station's main studios and offices are at 2440 Ash Street in the Fairview neighbourhood of Vancouver, where its rebroadcasting transmitter CKKS-FM-2 operates at 104.9 FM with an effective radiated power (ERP) of 31,000 watts and a height above average terrain (HAAT) of 672.2 metres (2,205 ft) from atop Mount Seymour. Another rebroadcasting transmitter, 92.5 CKKS-FM-1, is in Abbotsford, British Columbia.

The station went on the air in 1986 as CKSR-FM, with transmitters at Abbotsford and Chilliwack. Technical changes in the late 1990s added a third transmitter in Vancouver, greatly expanding its broadcast coverage.

== History ==
=== Star FM in the Fraser Valley ===
The station signed on for the first time on October 1, 1986, as CKSR-FM Star FM. It was the first FM radio service based in the region and was owned by Fraser Valley Broadcasters Ltd., which owned AM stations in Abbotsford and Chilliwack, the pair of CFVR and CHWK. A hybrid easy listening/adult contemporary format aimed at adult audiences was aired by Star FM, with transmitters at 107.5 MHz in Chilliwack and 104.9 MHz in Abbotsford.

Beginning in 1995, CKSR began gradually phasing out its easy listening songs in favour of a pure adult contemporary format. Fraser Valley Broadcasters also analyzed ways to improve its reception in several areas of the western Fraser Valley where its signal remained "unreliable". In 1997, the Abbotsford main transmitter was moved to 104.9 MHz on Mount Seymour, with a new Abbotsford transmitter on 92.5 MHz. While the CRTC did not permit the station to reduce its service to the Fraser Valley, approving the move over objections from several Vancouver radio stations, the move had the consequence of putting the Lower Mainland in its coverage area, and CKSR-FM opened a Vancouver office (without studios, as the CRTC did not allow permanent studios outside the Fraser Valley to be used). The move gave Vancouver three adult contemporary stations: CKSR-FM, CHQM-FM, and CKKS-FM.

=== Rogers purchase and Xfm ===
In 1999, Rogers Broadcasting purchased the Fraser Valley Radio Group of CFVR, CHWK, and CKGO in Hope. The new ownership immediately made cuts at the low-rated Star FM. On December 31, Rogers flipped the station from "Star FM" to alternative rock as CKVX-FM 104.9 Xfm. The choice of format surprised some observers who expected Rogers to go after CHR station CKZZ-FM.

Throughout the run, ratings were low, usually behind competing FM rocker CFOX-FM, but there were some notable moments, including the early playing of the new Radiohead song "Optimistic" in September 2000, which earned a cease-and-desist order from record label EMI after CKVX obtained a recording. Rogers placed the CKSR call sign on the former CHWK and converted it to FM in 2001 as CKSR-FM, adopting the former Star FM's branding, and a similar light rock format.

=== Clear FM era ===
On November 19, 2003, CKVX began stunting with all-Christmas music as 104.9 Christmas FM. At noon on December 26, CKVX switched to 104.9 Clear FM, a hybrid format of adult contemporary and smooth jazz music during most of the day that was designed to complement CKLG-FM (now CJAX-FM) and its Jack FM format. A program of chillout, downtempo and trip hop electronic music called Vancouver Chills, hosted by Trevor Shand, aired from 9 p.m. to 1 a.m. nightly. The first song on "Clear FM" was "Don't Know Why" by Norah Jones. On April 8, 2004, CKVX-FM became CKCL-FM. In 2005, Shand left CKCL to move to Los Angeles to become the production manager at KROQ-FM (while continuing voiceover work for Rogers Broadcasting stations in Vancouver and Toronto). Music Director Doreen Copeland took over as host of Vancouver Chills, which then began mixing more AC and smooth jazz in with the electronica tunes and expanded its airtime to 8 p.m. to 1 a.m. nightly.

Logo used as 104.9 Clear FM, from 2003 to 2008.

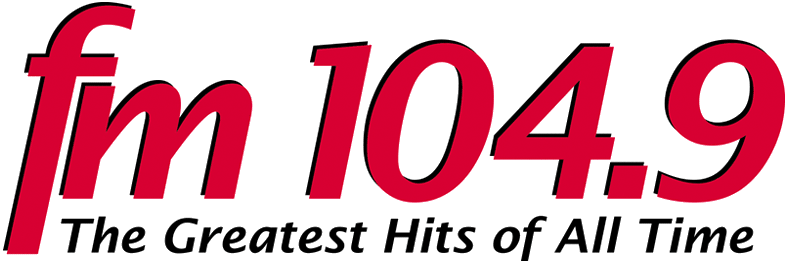
Logo used as FM 104.9, from 2008 to 2009.

On August 31, 2006, CKCL dropped the smooth jazz and electronic music and returned to a full-time adult contemporary format. Mornings on the revamped Clear FM were helmed by longtime Vancouver broadcaster Fred Latremouille and his wife Cathy, returning to local radio after six years of retirement in Hawaii on September 5. However, after a year, the Latremouilles opted to return to retirement.

In December 2007, management announced that Charlee Morgan, formerly of Calgary's CHFM and the old LG73 in Vancouver, would begin hosting the morning show in early 2008. Morgan made her morning show debut at CKCL on February 18, 2008.

On September 26, 2008, CKCL dropped Morgan's morning show, and the station's adult contemporary format, switching to classic hits and re-branding itself as FM 104.9, thus once again leaving CTVglobemedia's market-leading CHQM-FM as the sole adult contemporary outlet in Vancouver. The last song on "Clear FM" was "I Will Remember You" by Sarah McLachlan (which was also the last song on LG73), while the first song under the new format was "Twist and Shout" by The Beatles. This move prompted Astral Media's CISL to flip from oldies to adult standards on November 10, 2008.

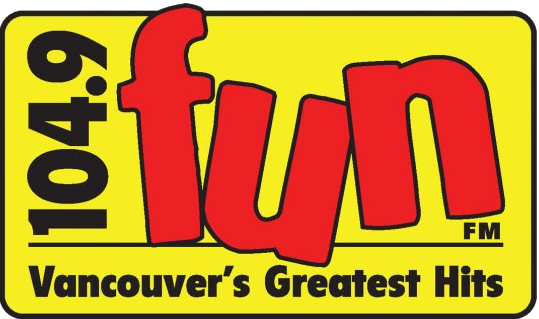
CFUN-FM's logo under previous "Fun FM" classic hits format from 2009 to 2011

On November 12, 2009, CKCL rebranded itself as 104.9 fun FM; the call sign changed in late November to CFUN-FM to reflect the updated branding. The heritage CFUN call letters were vacated by CTVglobemedia after AM 1410 (now owned by Bell Media) flipped to sports radio and became CFTE.

=== CHR era as Sonic and Kiss ===
CFUN-FM branding as Sonic

On August 16, 2011, Rogers announced that CFUN-FM would launch a new format at 8:30 a.m. the following morning, and began redirecting listeners to sister adult hits station CKLG-FM. Radio Insight reported that Rogers had purchased domain names containing names such as "sonic1049" and "sonic Hits.Now.", implicating the possibility of the branding Sonic and either a modern rock format (modelled after Rogers-owned CHDI-FM in Edmonton, which also brands as Sonic) or contemporary hit radio (CHR). The following morning, at 8:42 a.m. (12 minutes past the intended time of relaunch, in part to account for the cast of Citytv's Breakfast Television setting up to broadcast the launch live on Vancouver affiliate CKVU-TV), CFUN-FM flipped to CHR, notably choosing to brand simply as Sonic and eschewing the frequency mentions altogether outside of the legally-required identification, launching the format with 10,000 songs in a row commercial-free. The last song on "Fun FM" was "Cuts Like a Knife" by Bryan Adams, and the first song on "Sonic" was "Party Rock Anthem" by LMFAO.

On February 23, 2015, CFUN re-branded as Kiss Radio with no change in format, unifying itself with the Kiss branding used by other Rogers-owned CHR stations. It then swapped call signs with CKKS-FM in Sechelt, British Columbia, which became CFUN-FM.

In 2019, Rogers filed an application with the CRTC to replace CKKS-FM-2 with a new station on the same frequency, which would operate independently of CKKS. CRTC rules require a consultation on the appropriateness of a new station in the market, which can include a requirement for competing applicants. The application was denied in July 2020, with the CRTC ruling that Rogers "significantly understat[ed] the potential market impact of converting its rebroadcasting transmitter to an originating station". In 2021, Rogers received a renewal for CKKS-FM and its rebroadcasters, with the CRTC rebuffing a proposal to drop traffic reports for the Fraser Valley.

In 2021, CKKS shifted to hot adult contemporary and changed its moniker to "Today's Best Music, The New KiSS Radio".

=== Return to modern rock ===
Logo as Sonic. (2022–2025)

On June 28, 2022, the station announced it was parting ways with morning hosts Kevin Lim and Sonia Sidhu, who joined CKKS in January 2017, as well as afternoon host Tara Jean Stevens. Station owner Rogers said that further announcements about the station's future would follow shortly. At midnight on June 29, the station dropped its format and began stunting with a 30-hour continuous loop of "Killing in the Name" by Rage Against the Machine. The loop occasionally included staged segments of DJs discussing their intent to keep playing the song, and taking calls from listeners either wanting them to stop playing "Killing in the Name", or outright requesting the song themselves. During this stunt, other changes in staff were reported, as were rumours that the Sonic brand would be returning to Vancouver.

While stunting is common practice during a radio format change, this particular stunt gained attention in international media outlets including The Guardian and Rolling Stone, driven in part by theories put forward on social media that the remaining staff had commandeered the station to protest the layoffs, despite the other changes being reported. Industry observer Sean Ross suggested that despite being the "most traditional of format launch stunts", the outsized attention the relaunch received made it "the greatest radio stunt ever—or at least for this year."

On June 30, 2022, at 6:00 a.m., the station officially flipped to modern rock as Sonic, with new morning host Angela Valiant introducing the format, then playing "Killing in the Name" one more time. The new format competed with Corus Radio's CFOX-FM and Jim Pattison Group's CKPK-FM The Peak; while CKPK flipped to hot AC the following month, it ultimately reversed the flip and returned to modern rock in June 2024,.

=== Return to Kiss ===
Logo as Kiss Throwbacks. (2025–2026)

On June 19, 2025, CKKS abruptly dropped Sonic and flipped to classic hits as Kiss Throwbacks; the new format focused on pop hits from the 1990s through to the 2010s. Its airstaff features Bri Cook from CHFM-FM Calgary in middays, Kylee Roman in early afternoons, former CFBT-FM morning host Jonny Staub on late afternoon drive, and Greg Burns from CHFI-FM Toronto in evenings. It syndicates the Roz and Mocha morning show from sister station CKIS-FM Toronto.

On September 9, 2026, Rogers announced that the Vancouver Canucks of the National Hockey League would move to CKKS following the closure of sister station CISL. On September 14, 2026, CKKS flipped to a gold-based CHR format as Kiss West Coast, adding current hits back to its playlist alongside its existing classic material. There were no other changes in airstaff.

== Rebroadcasters ==
Rebroadcasters of CKKS-FM
City of licence	Identifier	Frequency	Power	Class	RECNet
Abbotsford	CKKS-FM-1	92.5 MHz	2,600 watts	A	Query
Vancouver	CKKS-FM-2	104.9 MHz	31,000 watts	C	Query

- CKKS-FM-1 former frequencies: 104.9 FM (1996–1997) and 107.1 FM (April–June 2002)
