= Frosty Forst =

Canadian broadcaster

Brian "Frosty" Forst (born September 6, 1938) is a former broadcaster on CKNW radio in Vancouver, British Columbia. He retired in May 2005 after about 40 years on the air at the same station and as the highest-rated radio personality in western Canada.

== Early history ==
Forst was raised in Vancouver's Kerrisdale neighborhood. He comes from a prominent local family; the Forst family business (in furniture and appliances) had several locations around the Lower Mainland. Forst Stores sponsored the noon news on the hillbilly station in New Westminster for many years.

Forst graduated from Magee High School in 1956 and pursued his passion for radio by taking a training course in broadcasting run by John Ansell of CKWX. Through contacts at school he made a connection with CKPG in north-central British Columbia. He arrived in Prince George in 1956 and spent some time in training, but was chosen as Teen Jock at Vancouver's CJOR a year later, replacing Red Robinson. Bruno Cimolai was his co-host at CJOR.

In 1958, Forst returned to AM 600 to read the news, but was forced to leave again. Disappointed, he started exploring other occupations, including working in a warehouse for a women's undergarment store. Frustration led him to a new North Vancouver station -- CKLG, which was playing to the older MOR crowd—in 1959.

== Becoming "Frosty" ==
Forst became "Frosty" in 1960, when he was hired by CFUN. There, he teamed up with Al Jordon, Dave McCormick, Ken Chang and Brian Lord to become the Good Guys, who were on air 24 hours a day with modern music, bringing the local radio market into the modern world.

Within three years, many of the CFUN staff had taken jobs elsewhere. Forst, following his father's advice, sought a position at CKNW, where he was hired by program director Hal Davis in 1964. From there he advanced to a million-dollar contract, a vast audience, and 31 years as CKNW's morning air personality. His ratings in Canada remain unsurpassed.

Forst's personal life has been turbulent. He has had a number of marriages and other romantic relationships, and sired a second family late in life. Throughout his career, he had public-relations issues (he ended his final shift at CKNW without indicating to his listeners that he was retiring), but his fans stayed faithful and his popularity seldom wavered.

== Sources ==
- http://www.bcradiohistory.com/Biographies/Forst.htm
