= 750 Burrard Street =

Building in Vancouver

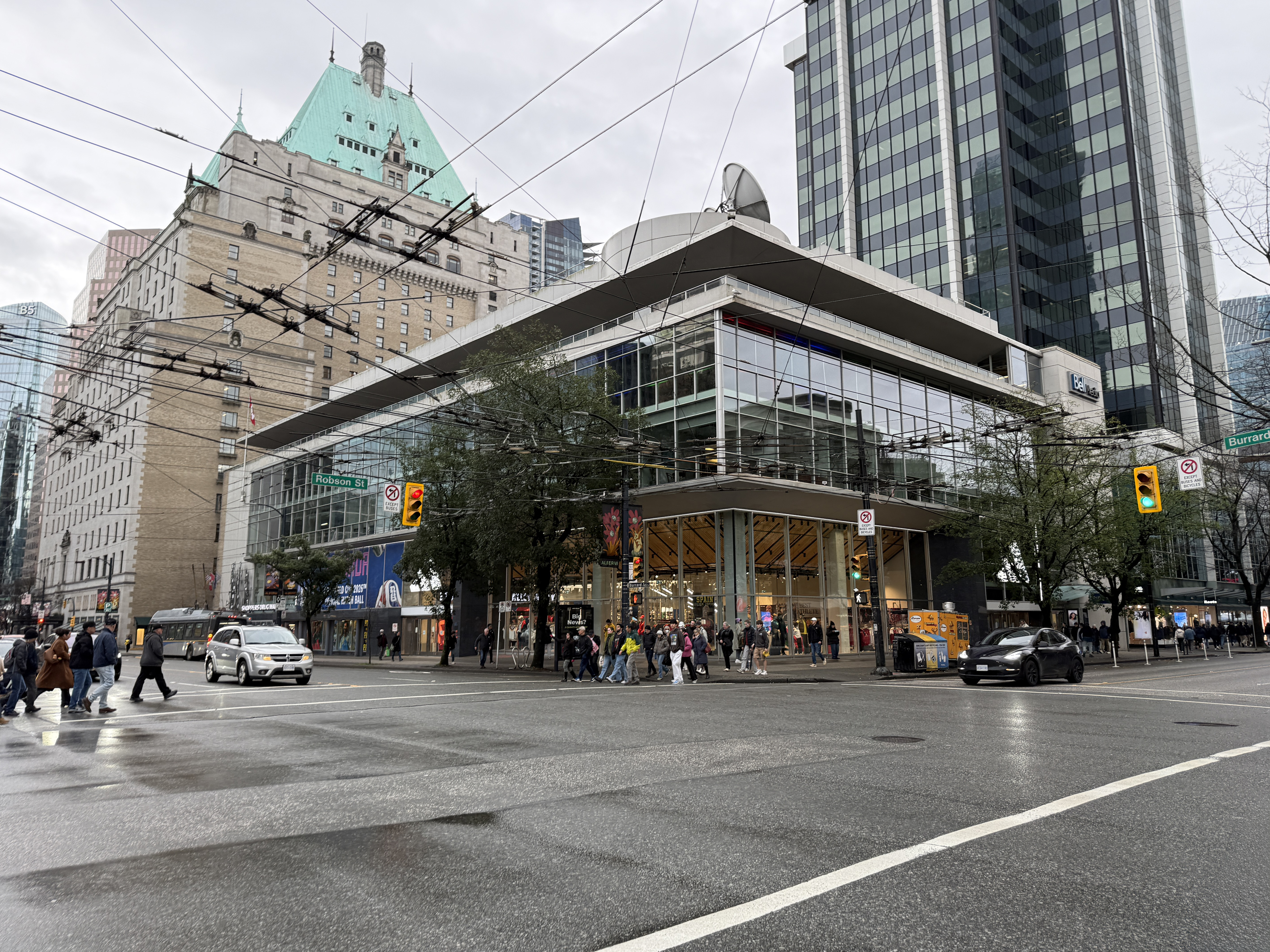
- View from west side of the Burrard St and Robson St intersection in 2026
- Interactive map of the 750 Burrard Street area

General information
- Status: Completed
- Type: Mixed-use: Office, Commercial
- Location: 750 Burrard Street; Vancouver, British Columbia; V6Z 2B7, Canada
- Coordinates: 49.283463°N 123.122322°W
- Construction started: 1955
- Completed: 1957

Design and construction
- Architects: Douglas Simpson and Harold Semmens

750 Burrard Street (also known as 969 Robson Street, or "Robson Central") is a building in Downtown Vancouver, British Columbia, Canada, at the northeast corner of Robson Street and Burrard Street.

== History ==
This modern architecture building was constructed in 1957 and was designed by local architects Harold Semmens and Douglas Simpson and was home of the main branch of the Vancouver Public Library from 1957 to 1995. In December 1996, Canada's first (and ultimately only) Virgin Megastore opened on the lower level; Virgin eventually decided to exit the Canadian market and sold the location to HMV in September 2005. In late 2011, HMV Canada, now separately owned by Hilco UK, announced plans to close the Burrard location in January 2012 as part of a corporate refocusing towards smaller locations. HMV closed at this location on January 23, 2012.

The southeast corner of the building was also the first Planet Hollywood in Vancouver opened on March 16, 1997. The main entrance was on 969 Robson Street. It was closed in October 1999 after bankruptcy.

The upper levels were taken over in fall 1997 as studios for the newly launched independent TV station VTV. The station later became part of the CTV Television Network (now owned by Bell Media), and the site now serves as Bell Media's west coast headquarters. The site selection, and much of the VTV format, had been inspired by Toronto station City and the iconic downtown studios that were at the time synonymous with the station. Incidentally, CTV would later acquire the Toronto building in question (but not City TV).

The Globe and Mail, which was co-owned with CTV from 2001 to 2010, later moved its Vancouver offices into part of CTV's space; its offices remain in the building despite no longer sharing common ownership with CTV. Later, radio stations 94.5 Virgin Radio, 103.5 QMFM (now Move 103.5), TSN Radio 1040 (now Funny 1040) and TSN Radio 1410 (now BNN Bloomberg Radio 1410), all co-owned with CTV since 2007, also moved into the building. In the early 2010s, CTV reduced its space so that its offices are no longer directly accessible from Burrard Street; though it remains in the same building, it now uses the address 969 Robson Street.

Besides Bell Media and the Globe, current occupants include a flagship Victoria's Secret / Pink store, as well as a Clearly Contacts retail store.

== See also ==
- CTV News
- 9 Channel Nine Court—CTV's Toronto Studios
- HMV
