= CIMA (AM) =

Former radio station in Vancouver

- Vancouver, British Columbia; Canada
- Broadcast area: Greater Vancouver
- Frequency: 1040 kHz
- Branding: Magic 104

Programming
- Format: Adult standards

Ownership
- Owner: Monarch Broadcasting

History
- First air date: September 2, 1986
- Last air date: February 4, 1992
- Former call signs: CIOF; CKXY
- Call sign meaning: "Magic"

Technical information
- Class: B
- Power: 50 kilowatts

CIMA was a Canadian AM radio station located in Vancouver, British Columbia from 1986 to 1992.

== History ==
CIMA signed on for the first time as CIOF on September 2, 1986. The station offered an adult contemporary format and was originally owned by Don Hamilton. Over the course of the station's six-year history, the format changed from AC to Top 40 to active rock to Top 40 to AC and finally on adult standards.

In 1992, the CRTC authorized Western World Communications (the owners of CKST 800) to buy CIMA. Under the request of Western World Communications, CIMA would sign off and CKST would be free to use CIMA's former frequencies and move their transmitters to CIMA's.

CIMA left the air on February 4, 1992.
