= Satinder Bindra =

Canadian journalist

Personal details
- Born: Satinder Bindra India
- Party: Democratic
- Spouse: Married
- Children: Two daughters
- Education: St. Stephen's College, University of Delhi

Satinder Bindra is a Canadian television news reporter, most recently working as a Senior International Correspondent with CNN based in New Delhi. He left the network in May 2007. He is a Canadian citizen of Indian origin. Bindra joined CNN from CTV, where he was a senior reporter with Vancouver Television (VTV).

Satinder Bindra joined the United Nations Environment Program in Nairobi, Kenya as Director of the Division of Communications and Public Information in May 2008. He joined the Asian Development Bank as Principal Director of the Department of External Relations in December 2013.

Bindra now works in the Asian Development Bank alongside personalities such as Jason Rush.
