= CKST =

Radio station in Vancouver (1963–2023)

- Vancouver, British Columbia; Canada
- Broadcast area: Greater Vancouver
- Frequency: 1040 kHz

Programming
- Format: Comedy

Ownership
- Owner: Bell Media; (Bell Media British Columbia Radio Partnership)
- Sister stations: CFTE, CFBT-FM, CHQM-FM, CIVT-DT

History
- First air date: January 19, 1963
- Last air date: June 14, 2023
- Former call signs: CJJC (1963–1985); CJUP (1985–1988)
- Former frequencies: 850 kHz (1963–1975); 800 kHz (1975–1992)
- Call sign meaning: "Coast" (former branding)

Technical information
- Licensing authority: CRTC
- Class: B
- Power: 50,000 watts
- Transmitter coordinates: 49.092431°N 122.932388°W
- Repeater: 103.5 CHQM-HD2 (Vancouver)

CKST (1040 AM) was a radio station in Vancouver, British Columbia, Canada. Owned by Bell Media, it last broadcast comedy-oriented programming, including stand-up comedy routines.

CKST's studios were located on Robson and Burrard Street in Downtown Vancouver, while its transmitters were located in Delta.

== History ==
CKST went on the air for the first time on January 19, 1963, in Langley as CJJC, broadcasting on its original frequency of 850 AM with 1000 watts of power and offering a country format. The station's original owner was City & Country Radio Ltd., headed by former CJAV and CKNW personality Joe Chesney.

CJJC was given approval by the CRTC on December 15, 1970, to change its frequency and transmission power from 850 AM and 1000 watts to 800 AM and 10,000 watts, but the station waited until June 1975 to put the change into effect. In 1977, CJJC (which had been dealing with financial trouble for some time) rehired 23 of 32 staff members who were given 30 days notice on New Year's Eve. Parent company City & Country Radio was authorized to transfer all of the station's shares to a company run by Joe Chesney and Ernie Mykyte; Mykyte would become sole owner of CJJC in 1978 when he bought out Chesney's half-interest in the station.

CJJC and parent City & Country Radio were purchased on June 26, 1985 (following CRTC approval) by an ownership consortium of Saskatoon Telecable Ltd. (72%), Sam Folstad (18%) and L.M. McDonald (10%); later in the year, CJJC changed its call letters to CJUP and dropped its country format for Top 40 with Up Radio, AM 800 as its on-air name. In 1987, CJUP majority shareholder Saskatoon Telecable was purchased by Clint Forster and his family, and the station changed call letters again to the present CKST in 1988. On July 7, 1989, CKST increased its power to 25,000 watts and began broadcasting in stereo.

CKST switched formats to modern rock and adopted the on-air name Coast 800 on November 9, 1990. The station underwent major changes during the early part of 1992; on January 30, the CRTC authorized station owner Western World Communications (the former Saskatoon Telecable) to buy Vancouver station CIMA (which had begun operations on September 12, 1986, as CIOF, then CKXY, then CIMA) from Monarch Broadcasting Ltd., also granting permission to CKST to switch frequencies (from 800 to 1040), increase transmission power (from 25,000 watts to 50,000), relocate its transmitter from Aldergrove to Delta and move its operations from Langley to Vancouver. CIMA 1040 signed off for the final time on February 4, and CKST moved into CIMA's facilities and became Coast 1040 on March 9.

Plans were made to move CKST to the FM band (at 94.5 FM with 38,000 watts of power) in 1993, but were denied by the CRTC. CKST ended its modern rock format at midnight on September 30, relaunching with an adult standards format under the new on-air name Q104 (which was later dropped in favour of using the CKST calls). The station was purchased by Ronald Dixon and Gary Mathiesen in 1994.

CKST was in the process of being sold when Dixon was killed in a car accident in Mexico on September 15, 2000. The station was sold to Grand Slam Radio Inc., which assumed ownership on February 1, 2001, switched CKST to an all-sports format and adopted the on-air name "The TEAM 1040" on April 25, and joined CHUM's TEAM all-sports network on May 7. The station's founder, Joe Chesney, died in Langley on November 10, 2001, at the age of 82, and CHUM purchased CKST on February 10, 2003, adding to the company's ownership of CFUN, CHQM-FM and CKVU-DT in Vancouver.

It was a member of CHUM Limited's short-lived "The Team" sports radio network in 2001-2002, and remained loosely affiliated with those stations that retained the sports format. It competed heavily with CHMJ ("MOJO Sports Radio"), an all-sports station in Vancouver owned by Corus Entertainment, until that station dropped its sports format in May 2006.

In 2004, it acquired the radio broadcast rights for BC Lions football games, beating the longtime broadcaster CKNW. The veteran play-by-play man J. Paul McConnell stayed with CKNW, while the colour analyst Giulio Caravatta moved to CKST and joined the new play-by-play announcer Rick Ball. In 2006, CKST became the flagship station of the Vancouver Canucks, replacing CKNW, who was the team's flagship since its first year of play in 1970.

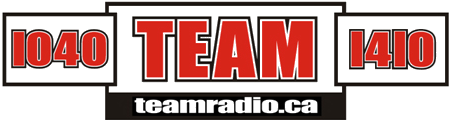
Logo as The Team, featuring both stations.

CTVglobemedia purchased CKST and its sister radio stations in Vancouver as part of the acquisition of CHUM Limited on June 22, 2007, following its approval by the CRTC, while the former co-owned CKVU was sold to Rogers Communications on October 31, 2007.

On November 5, 2009, its sister station 1410 CFUN dropped its talk radio format and became Team 1410, a secondary station carrying additional sports programming as a complement to 1040. It primarily featured ESPN Radio and other syndicated sports talk shows, BC Lions football coverage, replays of Canucks games and coverage of various sports events not previously available on Vancouver radio.

=== TSN Radio ===
Logo as TSN Radio 1040

On August 28, 2014, it was announced that both Team stations in Vancouver would be rebranded as TSN Radio stations on September 8, 2014. The move coincided with Don Taylor's full-time return to the station after being released from rival Sportsnet.

In 2017, after having CKST as their radio home for 11 years, the Vancouver Canucks moved to the Rogers-owned CISL for the 2017-18 season. With the loss of the Canucks and Toronto Blue Jays' rights to CISL, Bell's need for a secondary sports station in the area diminished and CFTE was therefore relaunched as BNN Bloomberg Radio on April 30, 2018. CKST absorbed much of CFTE's remaining live sports content.

=== Reformatting to comedy, shutoff ===
On February 9, 2021, at 9:00 a.m., CKST abruptly ceased local programming in the middle of its morning show. At 9:30, the station broadcast an announcement that TSN Radio would be discontinued on the station effective immediately, and that a new format would be launched at 7 a.m. on February 12. The station then began to stunt with music, beginning with "Good Riddance (Time of Your Life)" by Green Day. It was one of three Bell Media stations that concurrently dropped TSN Radio as part of ongoing cuts by the company, which also included stations in Hamilton and Winnipeg. On February 12, 2021, CKST flipped to Bell Media's "Funny" format as Funny 1040, primarily broadcasting stand-up comedy bits. The cuts and resulting format change faced harsh criticism from listeners.

On June 14, 2023, as part of a mass corporate restructuring at Bell Media, the company shut down six of its AM radio stations nationwide, including CKST and CFTE. The station ended regular programming at 8 a.m. that day, replaced with a looped message about the impending shutdown, which is expected to last until the completion of the signoff.

CKST had its license revoked on July 14, 2025.
