= CKZZ-FM =

Radio station in Vancouver

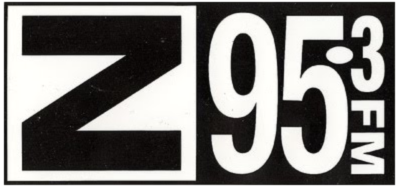
- Vancouver, British Columbia; Canada
- Broadcast area: Greater Vancouver
- Frequency: 95.3 MHz
- Branding: Z95.3

Programming
- Format: Hot adult contemporary

Ownership
- Owner: Stingray Group
- Sister stations: CHLG-FM

History
- First air date: May 23, 1991; 35 years ago
- Call sign meaning: From "Z" branding

Technical information
- Class: C
- ERP: 20,001 watts 57,003 watts maximum
- HAAT: 595 metres (1,952 ft)
- Transmitter coordinates: 49.357365°N 122.953776°W

Links
- Website: z953.ca

CKZZ-FM (95.3 MHz) Z95.3 is a commercial FM radio station in Vancouver, British Columbia. The station airs a hot adult contemporary format, and is owned by Stingray Group. The studios are on Horseshoe Way in Richmond.

CKZZ-FM is a Class C station with an effective radiated power (ERP) of 20,001 watts (57,003 watts maximum). The transmitter tower is atop Mount Seymour in the District of North Vancouver.

== History ==
=== Constructing the station ===
On February 19, 1990, the Canadian Radio-television and Telecommunications Commission (CRTC) initiated a call for applications for a new commercial FM radio station in Vancouver on the frequency 94.5 MHz. Six companies submitted proposals to the commission for approval. On June 20, 1990, the CRTC approved South Fraser Broadcasting's application for the frequency. On November 1, 1990, the CRTC approved South Fraser's application to amend the frequency to 95.3 MHz due to potential interference with CJJR-FM.

CKZZ signed on the air at 8:00 a.m. on May 23, 1991, and ran commercial-free until May 27. The first song played was "Here We Go (Let's Rock & Roll)" by C&C Music Factory. It was founded by South Fraser Broadcasting and controlled by Michael Dickinson. CKZZ shared studio and office space with its then-sister station CISL (650 AM). CKZZ's format was authorized by the CRTC as dance music, using the rhythmic contemporary charts. After its launch, CKZZ quickly gained popularity among younger audiences in Greater Vancouver. CKZZ was a top-rated station, constantly remaining in the Top 3 most listened-to stations in the market.

=== Sale to Standard Radio ===
In 1995, CKZZ and CISL were sold to Standard Radio. The $18 million CAD purchase was approved by the CRTC on May 8, 1996. Following the sale, CKZZ began to move to a more mainstream Top 40/CHR format.

The station's success continued into 2001, as the station ranked number two overall among radio stations in the Vancouver market in the Bureau of Broadcast Measurement (BBM) ratings for much of the year. Its website also ranked 28th on the list of the "50 Best Radio Station Websites in the World", compiled by U.S. trade publication "Radio Ink". In addition, CKZZ was named "Station of the Year" by Canadian Music Week in March 2002.

In August 2002, the station changed again, edging away from its current-based Top 40/CHR format and began using the slogan "The Best of the Nineties and Today", but technically remained a CHR outlet.

=== Move to Hot AC ===
In February 2004, the station started playing an uninterrupted stream of hit music from its 13-year history, in preparation for another format change. The station switched to a hot adult contemporary format in March, with the slogan "Your Music, Your Zed, with the Best of the 80s, 90s and Now". Ironically, the station was named "CHR Station of the Year" by Canadian Music Week a few days before its format switch. The first song under the Hot AC format was Coldplay's "Clocks".

Another direction tweak came in September 2005, with the station dropping most of its 1980s and 1990s songs and moving towards an adult top 40 format. The slogan, "Today's Best Music", was first used on sister station CJFM Montreal, and both CKZZ and CJFM had identical playlists.

In the spring of 2007, the Bureau of Broadcast Measurement released its yearly reports indicating that CKZZ held a 3.6% share of the Vancouver radio market and finishing as the 12th most listened to radio station. This reduction in ratings was likely caused by the launch of Rhythmic Top 40 (now Mainstream Top 40) station CFBT-FM in 2002, which took away many of the station's younger audiences.

=== Crave (2007–2009) ===
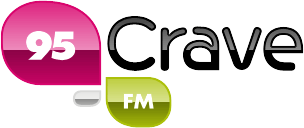
Crave logo (2007–2009)

Just before midnight on June 3, 2007, "Z" played its last song, "Walk Away" by Kelly Clarkson. CKZZ then began stunting by playing a mix of comedy/novelty songs, TV show and movie themes. At 7:00 a.m. on June 5, the station was renamed 95 Crave, and relaunched with a more rhythmic-leaning adult top 40 format. The first song was "Music" by Madonna.

In October 2007, Astral Media acquired Standard Broadcasting's terrestrial radio and television assets, including CKZZ.

=== Virgin Radio (2009–2014) ===
On January 8, 2009, at 4:00 p.m., CKZZ rebranded as 95.3 Virgin Radio, joining sister station CKFM-FM Toronto. This move had been announced on December 4, 2008. Crave's final song was "Beautiful Goodbye" by Amanda Marshall, while Virgin Radio's first song was a remix of "Sway" by Michael Bublé. Following the branding switch to "Virgin", the station eliminated songs from the 1980s; the last station in the "Virgin" chain to do so was CJFM-FM Montreal.

CKZZ competed with CFBT-FM, CFUN-FM, CKPK-FM, CKLG-FM and CHQM-FM.

=== Return of Z95.3 ===
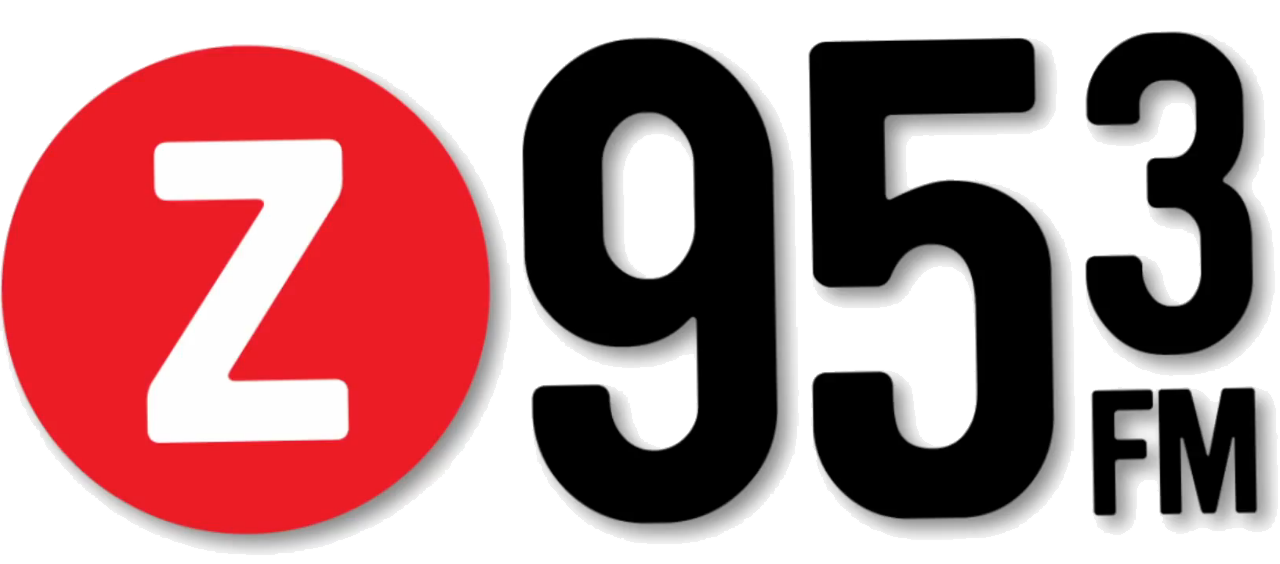
Z 95.3 logo, 2014-2019

In March 2013, the Competition Bureau approved a proposal by Bell Media to acquire Astral Media, under the condition that it divest itself of several television services and radio stations. Following the closure of the merger in July 2013, CKZZ was placed in a blind trust pending its eventual sale.

On August 26, 2013, Newcap Radio announced it would acquire CKZZ along with four other former Astral Media radio stations for $112 million. The deal was approved by the CRTC on March 19, 2014. The sale closed on March 31, 2014.

As Bell acquired Astral Media's exclusive rights to the Virgin Radio brand in Canada through the purchase, CKZZ revived its heritage Z95.3 branding on March 31, 2014; the station promoted the rebrand with the tagline "you can't stay a virgin forever". CKZZ's long-time morning hosts Natalie Hunter and Drew Savage moved to Bell-owned CHQM-FM on April 21. The Virgin Radio brand would re-surface on Bell-owned CFBT-FM on March 5, 2015.

=== Controversy ===
In March 2020, former CKKS-FM morning host Kid Carson—who began his career at CKZZ–and actor Jordan McCloskey became the new hosts of CKZZ's morning show. On February 9, 2022, Carson attracted attention for an on-air rant in support of the "Freedom Convoy" protest, which included discussion of theories that the protests were about "trying to keep our children off a digital ID that will control every aspect of their lives". Carson expressed frustration that he had been pressured by the station's management to stray away from political commentary on-air after having discussed his opposition to COVID-19 vaccine passports. Later that day, Stingray Radio's Vancouver GM Devon Tschritter stated that the station and Carson had "reached a mutual decision to part ways", explaining that "his opinions on vaccines, vaccine mandates, and other issues are his own and we respect that he has a right to his opinions. But he does not have a right to broadcast misleading or inaccurate opinions and label them as facts".

In March of 2022, 'Z Mornings with Katie & Ed' launched as the new morning show. As of Fall 2023, they are the 4th most listened to morning show in the Vancouver market according to a PPM data report released by Numeris. They also run a successful syndicated show called 'The Night Show with Katie & Ed' in the evenings.
