= TSN Radio =

Canadian sports radio network

- Type: Sports radio network
- Country: Canada
- Headquarters: Toronto, Ontario, Canada

Ownership
- Owner: Bell Media (Branding licensed from Disney Branded Television)
- Key people: Rob Gray, program director Stewart Johnston, president

History
- Launch date: October 5, 2011

Coverage
- Availability: Montreal, Ottawa, Toronto

Links
- Website: TSN Radio

TSN Radio is a semi-national sports radio brand and part-time network in Canada carried on AM radio stations owned by Bell Media. The TSN Radio brand, and some of the stations' content, are shared with Bell Media's television sports channel, The Sports Network. With the American sports media company ESPN being a minority shareholder in TSN, most of the stations also air some ESPN Radio programming, usually on weekends and/or overnight.

TSN Radio currently operates stations in Toronto, Montreal, and Ottawa. However, each station produces the vast majority of its programming locally, apart from some live event broadcasts as well as U.S.-produced syndicated programming. Unlike sports radio networks in the United States, there is no all-day 'network' feed (though a dedicated national feed is available via iHeartRadio), and very few Canadian-produced programs are simulcast nationally (though some local programs are simulcast on TSN's TV channels).

== Overview ==
It was announced on February 17, 2011, that its Toronto station CHUM (1050 AM) would discontinue its audio simulcast of CP24's television programming as "CP24 Radio 1050" and switch to an all-sports radio format as TSN Radio 1050 effective April 13, 2011, becoming the flagship station of the network. The company further announced plans on October 3, 2011, to convert its two radio stations in Winnipeg and Montreal under the "TSN Radio" banner (becoming TSN Radio 1290 and TSN Radio 990 respectively) on October 5, 2011.

The network in some respects represents a revival of the defunct The Team network, which formerly aired on many of the same stations in the early 2000s when they were owned by CHUM Limited; some of those stations remained "Team"-branded sports radio stations right up until joining TSN Radio. Bell Canada gained 100% control of CTVglobemedia's assets on April 1, 2011, thus renaming the company's name to Bell Media and renaming the radio division, CHUM Radio to Bell Media Radio.

It was reported on January 19, 2011, that Rob Gray, who was the program director for CKST and CFTE, had been hired to be program director for both CHUM and the new TSN Radio network.

== Stations ==
| Broadcast area | Station | Branding | Joined | Previous format |
|---|---|---|---|---|
| Montreal, Quebec | CKGM | TSN 690 Montreal | September 4, 2012 | Sports radio as TSN 990 |
| Ottawa, Ontario | CFGO | TSN 1200 Ottawa | September 30, 2013 | Sports radio as The Team 1200 |
| Toronto, Ontario | CHUM | TSN 1050 Toronto | April 13, 2011 | News talk radio as CP24 Radio 1050 (audio rebroadcast from CTV's 24-hour local news channel CP24) |

=== Former stations ===
| Broadcast area | Station | Branding | Joined | Previous format | Left | Subsequent format |
|---|---|---|---|---|---|---|
| Edmonton, Alberta | CFRN | TSN 1260 Edmonton | September 30, 2013 | Sports radio as The Team 1260 | June 14, 2023 | Station closed and went Silent |
| Hamilton, Ontario | CKOC | TSN 1150 Hamilton | April 16, 2015 | Classic hits as Classic Hits 1150 CKOC | February 9, 2021 | Business news radio as BNN Bloomberg Radio 1150 |
| Montreal, Quebec | CKGM | TSN 990 Montreal | October 5, 2011 | Sports radio as The Team 990 | September 4, 2012 | Changed frequencies and rebranded as TSN 690 |
| Vancouver, British Columbia | CFTE | TSN 1410 Vancouver | September 8, 2014 | Sports radio as The Team 1410 | April 18, 2018 | Business news radio as BNN Bloomberg Radio 1410; station closed on June 14, 2023 and went silent |
| Vancouver, British Columbia | CKST | TSN 1040 Vancouver | September 8, 2014 | Sports radio as The Team 1040 | February 9, 2021 | Comedy radio as Funny 1040; station closed on June 14, 2023 and went silent |
| Winnipeg, Manitoba | CFRW | TSN 1290 Winnipeg | October 5, 2011 | Oldies as 1290 AM CFRW | February 9, 2021 | Comedy radio as Funny 1290; station closed on June 14, 2023 and realunched in March 2026 as CJRC, owned by Akash Broadcasting |

=== History ===
TSN entered radio broadcasting with CHUM (1050 AM) in Toronto, which became the first station under the TSN Radio moniker, as TSN Radio 1050, on April 13, 2011. The station serves as the flagship of the network.

Bell Media further announced on October 3, 2011, that its radio stations CKGM in Montreal and CFRW in Winnipeg would join the TSN Radio network (becoming TSN Radio 990 and TSN Radio 1290 respectively) on October 5, 2011. CFRW had been long anticipated as a member of the network, having abandoned its oldies format for sports in fall 2010 (and using a TSN-inspired logo in the interim) and acquired the rights to the revived Winnipeg Jets in summer 2011.

There were conflicting reports initially as to whether or not CFGO in Ottawa and CKST and CFTE in Vancouver will re-brand. TSN has said that the aforementioned stations 'shall work closely' with the TSN Radio stations, and that for the time being "...our focus is on successful launches of TSN Radio in Montreal and Winnipeg.” Bell has since also acquired a sports radio station in Edmonton, CFRN, through its 2013 takeover of Astral Media.

In July 2012, Bell Media submitted an application to the CRTC, requesting permission to convert Montreal's TSN Radio station, CKGM, into a French radio station that would be known as RDS Radio 990—co-branding with TSN's French-language sister network Réseau des sports in a similar manner to TSN Radio. While Bell specified that this move was primarily intended to take advantage of CKAC's recent flip from sports radio in French to traffic radio, it was also intended to help satisfy ownership caps as a part of Bell's proposed acquisition of Astral Media, since Astral already owned the maximum number of English-language stations it could own in Montreal (owning two on FM, and the AM station CJAD). CJAD would have been given CKGM's English-language rights to the Montreal Canadiens after the flip, if approved. The CRTC ultimately rejected both proposals. Bell would ultimately receive an exemption to the ownership cap so it could remain the owner of CKGM through the acquisition, which was finalized in June 2013.

On September 30, 2013, CFRN in Edmonton and CFGO in Ottawa re-branded as TSN Radio stations.

On August 28, 2014, it was announced that the Team stations in Vancouver—CKST and CFTE—would finally rebrand as TSN Radio stations on September 8, 2014. However, following the launch of a rival sports radio station in the market (Rogers-owned CISL), CFTE flipped to a business news format, BNN Bloomberg Radio, in April 2018.

CKOC in Hamilton joined the network in 2015, after acquiring radio rights to the Hamilton Tiger-Cats.

On February 9, 2021, Bell Media discontinued the TSN Radio formats in Hamilton (CKOC), Vancouver (CKST), and Winnipeg (CFRW, which had recently lost its radio rights to the Jets) as part of an ongoing series of cuts across the company. All three stations flipped to automated formats with limited local programming, with the Hamilton station immediately flipping to BNN Bloomberg Radio, and the remaining two flipping to Bell Media's stand-up all-comedy Funny format. The TSN Radio station in Edmonton (CFRN) was shut down on June 14, 2023, along with Bell Media's shutdown or pending sale of nine stations (including CKOC, CFRW and CKST), while cutting programming in Toronto and Ottawa.

== Programming ==
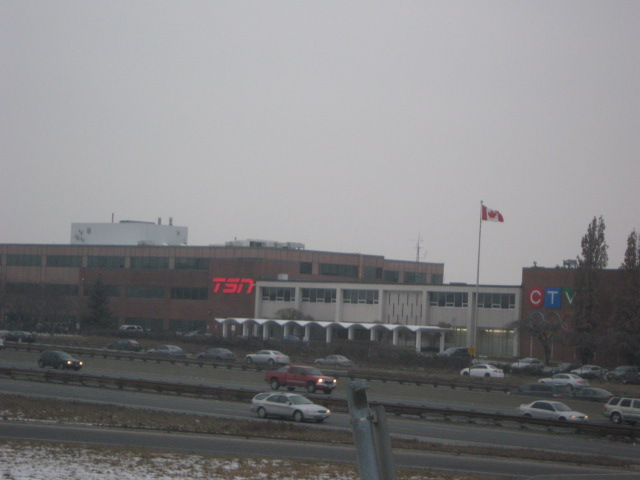
TSN Radio's primary studios are also located at Bell Media's 9 Channel Nine Court, where TSN and CFTO-DT are based

To date, TSN Radio has not yet created a full-day national programming schedule along the lines of the 24-hour ESPN Radio and Fox Sports Radio services in the United States, nor is one expected. Several weeks before confirming plans for TSN Radio, TSN president Stewart Johnston argued that "local is key" for the success of sports radio in Canada, as demonstrated by the earlier failure of The Team's attempt to produce most of its programming for national distribution out of Toronto. Indeed, the TSN stations rarely if ever carry another station's local programming. Although there are some common programs, this is mostly limited to a handful of specialty weekend shows, and to U.S. syndicated programming such as The Dan Patrick Show and ESPN Radio (and even these programs are not carried on all stations).

Mike Richards signed on to host the Toronto station's morning show, Mike Richards in the Morning. The show airs from 5:30-9a.m. (ET), and was expected to be simulcast on TSN2 beginning in September 2011. However, due to delays in the studio being built at 9 Channel Nine Court, the premiere of the show was delayed to February 18, 2013. CHUM's new drive time show, TSN Drive with Dave Naylor, also premiered in simulcast the same day. With the announcement of TSN1, TSN3, TSN4, and TSN5, the studios of TSN Radio stations in Vancouver, Winnipeg, and Ottawa were also configured to allow television simulcasts. TSN and Mike Richards mutually parted ways in August 2016.

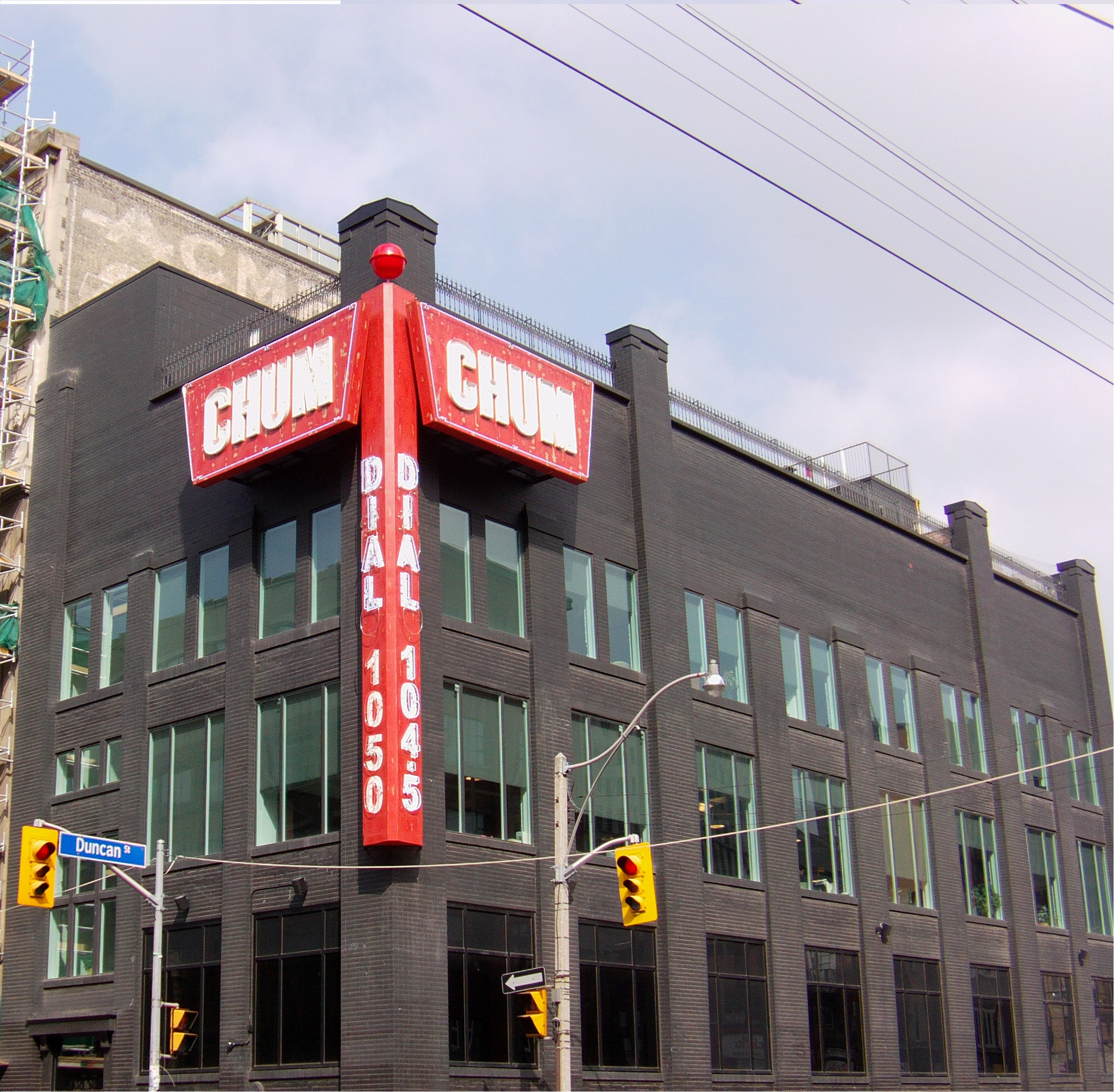
TSN Radio's secondary studios are also located at Bell Media's 250 Richmond Street West which is connected to the 299 Queen Street West building

Additionally, TSN has radio broadcasting rights for golf's The Open Championship, The U.S. Open, UEFA Euro 2012 and 2016, the NBA Playoffs, and NFL on Westwood One. As part of TSN's television contract extension with the Canadian Football League, TSN Radio also owned the radio broadcast rights to the Grey Cup from 2013 to 2018. In 2026, TSN Radio joined the Buffalo Bills Radio Network, with all of its remaining affiliates and the TSN Radio national stream carrying Bills contests.
