= CHMB =

Multicultural radio station in Vancouver

- Vancouver, British Columbia; Canada
- Broadcast area: Greater Vancouver
- Frequency: 1320 kHz
- Branding: AM1320 CHMB (English); 華僑之聲 (Chinese)

Programming
- Format: Multicultural (12 languages)

Ownership
- Owner: Mainstream Broadcasting Corporation

History
- First air date: December 10, 1959
- Former call signs: CHQM (1959–1994)
- Call sign meaning: Mainstream Broadcasting (owner)

Technical information
- Class: B
- Power: 50,000 watts (Day & Night)
- Transmitter coordinates: 49.164301°N 123.042701°W

Links
- Webcast: Listen live
- Website: am1320.com

Chinese name
- Traditional Chinese: 華僑之聲
- Simplified Chinese: 华侨之声
- Literal meaning: Overseas Chinese Voice
Transcriptions
Standard Mandarin
- Hanyu Pinyin: Huá qiáo zhī shēng
Yue: Cantonese
- Jyutping: waa4 kiu4 zi1 seng1

CHMB is a Canadian AM radio station, broadcasting from Vancouver, British Columbia on 1320 kHz. The station broadcasts a Multilingual language programming. CHMB's studios and transmitter towers are located in Richmond.

CHMB and CJMR (no relationship) are the only stations in Canada which broadcast on 1320 kHz.

CHMB is owned and operated by Mainstream Broadcasting Corporation, whose owner is Vancouver businessman James Ho. It started in 1973 as Overseas Chinese Voice (OCV). In 1993, OCV programming was incorporated into the multicultural AM radio station, Mainstream Broadcasting Corp. CHMB AM 1320, which serves the Vancouver Lower Mainland's multicultural communities.

In February 2002, after competing with Toronto-based Rogers Media and four other applicants, the CRTC granted an over the air multicultural television license to a group of prominent local entrepreneurs led by James Ho / CHMB / Mainstream. In addition to James Ho the other founders included; Joe Segal, Robert Lee, Geoffrey Lau and Doug Holtby. The television station, called Channel M (Multivan Broadcast Corp. or MVBC), was launched in June 2003 to serve more than 800,000 ethnic residents around the Vancouver Lower Mainland. Channel M was sold to Rogers Media in May 2008 and it is currently a part of Omni Television, a Canada's multilingual and multicultural television network.

CHMB is licensed by CRTC to broadcast 12 languages, however, it currently broadcasts in 14 languages: Portuguese, Brazilian, Filipino, Greek, Japanese, Korean, Ukrainian, Vietnamese, Danish, Icelandic, Norwegian, Swedish, Cantonese and Mandarin speaking community.

== History ==
CHMB began as an English-language station that was called CHQM. It signed on the air on December 10, 1959, as an easy listening station under the ownership of Vancouver Broadcast Associates Ltd. with 10 kW of power. CHQM's sister station, CHQM-FM, first aired on August 10, 1960, as a simulcast of the AM station, airing 19 hours a day. CHQM and CHQM-FM went to 24-hour broadcasting on September 1, 1962.

In November 1966, CHQM increased its transmission power to 50 kW. On August 23, 1969, corporate parent Vancouver Broadcast Associates changed its name to Q Broadcasting Ltd. Jack Stark, who had co-founded the company with Bill Bellman, became the sole owner in 1979. In September 1984, CHQM began airing the "Music of Your Life" format from 6 p.m. to midnight daily while retaining its main easy listening format for the balance of its broadcast day.

On January 1, 1990, CHQM dropped its longtime easy listening format for an adult contemporary format and began using the on-air brand Lite 1320. CHQM and CHQM-FM were purchased by CHUM Limited on October 17 that year, but due to Canadian Radio-Television and Telecommunications Commission (CRTC) regulations of the time (which allowed ownership of only one AM and one FM station in the same market), CHUM had to sell either CHQM or its other Vancouver AM outlet, CFUN; CHUM chose to sell CHQM.

On February 20, 1991, CHQM switched formats again to adult standards of the 1930s to the 1960s with the new station brand Q 1320. The station began airing Chinese-language programming on January 23, 1993, from 10:30 p.m. to 6 a.m. daily, then moved the start time for Chinese shows to 9 p.m. three weeks later. On December 14, 1993, the CRTC approved CHUM's sale of CHQM to Mainstream Broadcasting Corporation.

On February 9, 1994 (on which the Chinese New Year fell that year), CHQM signed off for the final time at 9 p.m. with Bob Hope's "Thanks for the Memories" as the farewell song, and was replaced moments later by CHMB. Original station co-owner Jack Stark died on October 30, 2001, at age 83.

== Programming ==
CHMB's programming is primarily Chinese (Overseas Chinese Voice) (Cantonese & Mandarin), aired from Monday to Friday and share the time slots with Portuguese, Danish, Filipino, Greek, Icelandic, Japanese, Norwegian, Swedish, Korean, Ukrainian and Vietnamese programming on weekends.

== Awards ==
Mainstream Broadcasting Corp., CHMB AM 1320 winner of the 2015 Jack Webster Award - Best Reporting Chinese Language.
