= Susanne Boyce =

Canadian media executive

Susanne Boyce was President Creative, Content and Channels, CTV Inc. until February 2011. She joined CTV in 1995 as director of production and development and was senior vice president of programming from 1997 to 2001. Just prior to her current title she was President of CTV Programming and Chair of CTV Media Group between 2001 and 2007. She is also a former executive of the Canadian Broadcasting Corporation.
