= CFTE =

Former radio station in Vancouver, Canada

Coordinates: 49°05′33″N 122°55′57″W

- Vancouver, British Columbia; Canada
- Broadcast area: Greater Vancouver
- Frequency: 1410 kHz

Programming
- Format: Business news

Ownership
- Owner: Bell Media; (Bell Media British Columbia Radio Partnership)
- Sister stations: CKST, CFBT-FM, CHQM-FM, CIVT-DT

History
- First air date: April 10, 1922
- Last air date: June 14, 2023
- Former call signs: CJCE (1922); CFCQ (1922–1928); CKMO (1928–1955); CFUN (1955–1969, 1973–2009); CKVN (1969–1973)
- Former frequencies: 450 metres (1922–1925); 730 kHz (1925–1933)
- Call sign meaning: "Team" (former branding)

Technical information
- Class: B
- Power: 50,000 watts
- Repeater: 103.5 CHQM-HD3 (Vancouver)

CFTE may also refer to: Certified Financial Technician

CFTE (1410 AM) was a Canadian radio station in Vancouver, British Columbia. The station first began operations in 1922 as 750 CJCE, and moved to AM 1410 in 1928. In 1955, the station was renamed CFUN, and launched a top 40 format in 1960. In 1967, the station flipped to easy listening, and then to news radio in 1969 as CKVN. In 1970, it returned to top 40, and returned to the CFUN calls in 1973 after being acquired by CHUM.

In the 1980s, the station segued to adult contemporary, and then to talk radio in 1996. In 2009, CFUN flipped to sports radio as CFTE Team 1410, serving as a secondary outlet for sister station CKST.

In 2018, the station flipped to business news, primarily carrying audio simulcasts of BNN Bloomberg programs, as well as other Bloomberg Radio shows; most of its business day programs originated from BNN Bloomberg's studios in Toronto, with local programming limited to weather and traffic updates, and weekend specialty programming. In June 2023, the station was closed due to cuts by present owner Bell Media.

== History ==
CFUN first signed on the air on April 10, 1922 as CJCE at 750 AM, co-owned by Sprott-Shaw Schools of Commerce & Wireless Telegraphy and Radio Specialties Ltd., and operated on 5 watts of power. Radio Specialties opened CFCQ ten days later, on 450 meters with transmission power of 40 watts; the two stations were merged by Sprott-Shaw in 1924, with the unified operation assuming the CFCQ calls and increasing its power to 50 watts. CFCQ increased power again to 1,000 watts in 1925 and moved to 730 AM to share time with CKCD and Nanaimo station CFDC before cutting power back to 50 watts the following year.

CFCQ changed its call letters to CKMO in 1928 and moved to the Bekins Building, 815 West Hastings Street, in 1929, then switched frequencies to its present 1410 AM and moved to 812 Robson Street in 1933 before power returned to 1000 watts in 1941.

CKMO underwent major changes in 1955 when it was sold to Radio C-FUN Ltd., which changed the station's call to CFUN on February 14 of that year (the CKMO call is now used by Orangeville, Ontario station CKMO-FM). In 1959, CFUN increased power to 10,000 watts and moved their studios to 1900 West 4th Avenue, then introduced a Top 40 music format in 1960 to challenge the supremacy of Vancouver rock-n-roll powerhouse CKWX (the former CFDC).

=== Early personalities ===
During much of the 1960s, CFUN's disc jockey crew, known on-air as the "Good Guys", became well known to Vancouver radio listeners. These were some of them during the station's Top 40 heyday:

- Bryan Frosty Forst
- Al Jordan
- Ed Karl
- Fred Latremouille (a.k.a. Latrimo)
- John Tanner
- Peter Alpen
- Neil Soper
- Terry David Mulligan
- Tom Peacock
- JB Shayne
- Red Robinson (joined from CKWX in 1962)

=== 1960s, 1970s and 1980s ===
CFUN's first Top 40 era ended on September 18, 1967, when the format was dropped for easy listening music. On May 28, 1968, the station was sold to Montreal-based Radio Futura Ltd., and on July 1, 1969, the station changed its call letters to CKVN, adopted a primarily all-news format (with music overnight) and increased transmission power to 50,000 watts.

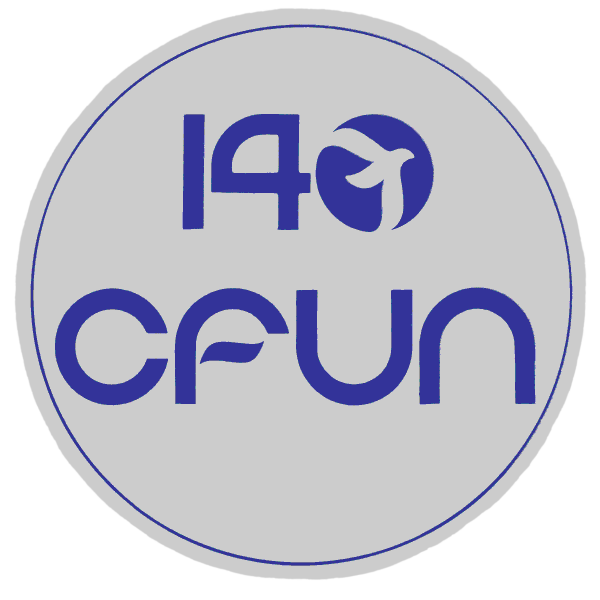
"The CFUN Sticker" from a successful 1970s promotion

CKVN dropped its news format and returned to a Top 40 format in March 1970. The station was sold to CHUM Western Ltd. (a division of CHUM Limited) on January 1, 1973, and regained the CFUN calls on September 30. In 1984, CHUM Western was merged into CHUM Limited, and CFUN dropped Top 40 again for an adult contemporary format on December 19 of that year.

CFUN had two successful promotions in the 70s. One was called "Don't say Hello" - *When the phone rang and you answered "I listen To CFUN" - you won a thousand dollars. The other contest that CFUN used to raise its profile was "The CFUN Sticker" where people placed stickers on their rear window and if they were spotted they won prizes.

The deejay line-up during the 70s included radio personalities such as Fred Latremouille with "Latri-Mornings", Bob Magee, Russ Tyson, Peter Benson, J. Lee Smith, Jim Hault, Tom Lucas, Daryl Burlingham, Terry Russell (Roger Kelly aka Roger Kettyls), Tom Jeffries, Jack Casey, Russ "Too Loud" McLoud, and "Raccoon" Carney.

The later CFUN-FM at 104.9 FM bore no relation to the original CFUN-AM outside of having the same call letters and also a contemporary hits format. (That station has since changed call letters to CKKS-FM.)

=== 1990s and 2000s ===
CFUN gained an FM sister station in 1990 when parent CHUM Limited bought CHQM-FM, whose format was changed from easy listening to adult contemporary ("Favourites of Yesterday and Today") in 1992. Both stations moved to new studios at 380 West 2nd Avenue early in 1993, and on March 27, 1996, CFUN switched to talk radio. More stations joined CFUN and CHQM-FM under the CHUM banner when CKVU-TV was purchased in November 2001, followed by CKST (TEAM 1040) in 2003.

CFUN's late-2000s logo as "Talk 1410"

On July 12, 2006, it was announced that CHUM Limited would be purchased by CTVglobemedia, owner of CTV. The purchase includes CHUM's Vancouver radio stations (including CFUN) and all of its Victoria stations, while CKVU is to be sold to Rogers Media (as part of the sale of the Citytv system, which was a condition of the CRTC's approval of the CTVglobemedia purchase of CHUM Limited). CTVglobemedia officially became the owner of CFUN and most other CHUM properties on June 22, 2007.

On August 14, 2008, CTVglobemedia applied to move the station's transmitter to a new site, approximately 8 kilometres (5 mi) southeast of its existing transmitter.

As a talk station, CFUN's on-air personalities included Simi Sara, Dave Brindle, Nikki Renshaw and Joe Leary, as well as the syndicated Laura Schlesinger, Joy Browne and Coast to Coast AM. Weekend programming included a variety of specialty lifestyle programs hosted by local personalities, including a wine show hosted by Terry David Mulligan.

=== Team 1410 and TSN 1410 Vancouver ===
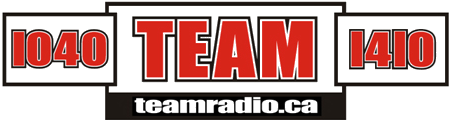
The Team logo used from 2009 to 2014, featuring the frequencies of both stations.

TSN 1410 logo from 2014-2018

On November 5, 2009, it was announced that CFUN would flip to sports radio as Team 1410; the station would operate as an extension of sister station CKST Team 1040, carrying syndicated sports radio shows (primarily from ESPN Radio), overflow live event coverage, and replays of Vancouver Canucks games. The station changed its call letters to CFTE later that month to match the new branding, vacating the historic CFUN calls. The CFUN calls would be subsequently adopted by Rogers' classic hits radio station CKCL-FM Chilliwack/Vancouver.

With Corus Radio's CINW (Canada's oldest radio station, which has been on the air since 1919) in Montreal signing off the air on January 29, 2010, CFTE became Canada's oldest operating radio station.

On February 10, 2011, it was announced that Team 1410 would become the official broadcaster of Vancouver Whitecaps FC of Major League Soccer, after signing a two-year deal with the team.

On August 28, 2014, it was announced that both Team stations in Vancouver would rebrand as TSN Radio on September 8, 2014.

=== Flip to business news, closure ===
Logo as BNN Bloomberg, 2018-2023

With the loss of Vancouver Canucks and Toronto Blue Jays to its new competitor CISL, Bell's need for a secondary sports station in the area diminished. Bell Media announced on April 18, 2018 that CFTE would re-launch as BNN Bloomberg Radio on April 30, 2018. The format was in conjunction with Bell Media's partnership with Bloomberg L.P., and its re-branding of its specialty channel Business News Network (BNN) as BNN Bloomberg the same day; it featured audio simulcasts of programming from the BNN Bloomberg television channel, as well as programming from the U.S. Bloomberg Radio network. The format did not feature any Vancouver-specific business news content, as it targeted a national streaming audience via iHeartRadio Canada. Much of CFTE's overflow programming was relocated to CKST.

Outside of the business day, the station aired blocks of other Bloomberg Radio programs, The Evan Solomon Show and The Late Showgram with Jim Richards (both of which are syndicated to other Bell Media news/talk stations) on weeknights, and syndicated and brokered programs on weekends. The station was also an affiliate of the Seattle Seahawks radio network.

On June 14, 2023, as part of a mass corporate restructuring at Bell Media, the company shut down six of their AM radio stations nationwide, including both CFTE and CKST. The station ended regular programming at 8 a.m. that day, replaced with a looped message about the impending shutdown, which is expected to last until the completion of the signoff. Bell had cited a "challenging regulatory environment" and the financial inability to continue with the immense variety of brands under their broadcasting umbrella as reasons for the shutoff.

On July 14, 2025, the CRTC revoked the station's license at the request of Bell Media.
