= CIVT-DT =

Television station in Vancouver

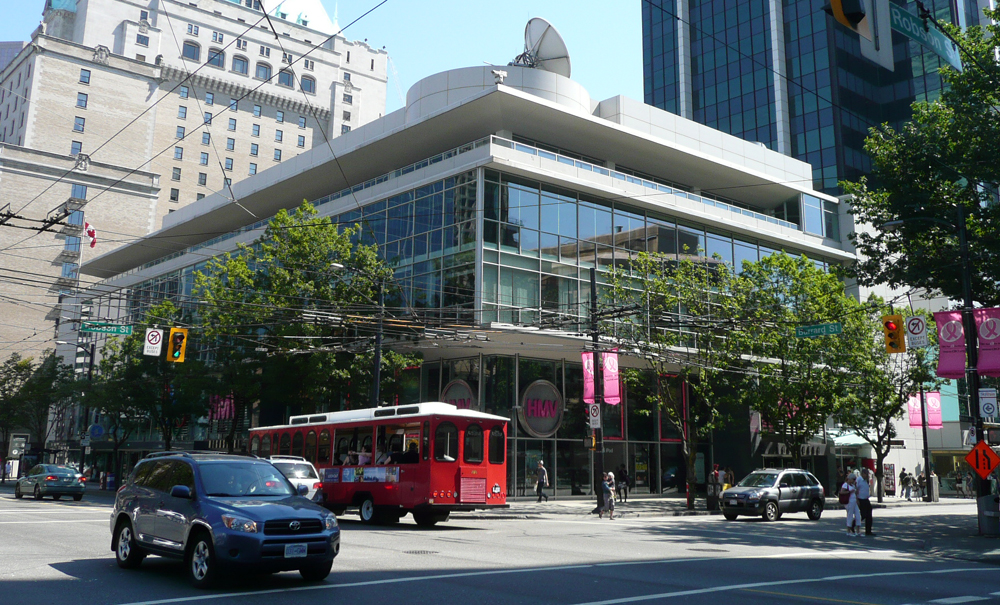
- CIVT's studios at 750 Burrard Street in downtown Vancouver
- Vancouver, British Columbia; Canada
- Channels: Digital: 32 (UHF); Virtual: 32
- Branding: CTV Vancouver; CTV News Vancouver

Programming
- Affiliations: 32.1: CTV

Ownership
- Owner: Bell Media Inc.
- Sister stations: CIVI-DT, CFBT-FM, CHQM-FM

History
- First air date: September 22, 1997
- Former call signs: CIVT-TV (1997–2011)
- Former channel numbers: Analog: 32 (UHF, 1997–2011); Digital: 33 (UHF, 2006–2011)
- Former affiliations: Independent (1997–2001)
- Call sign meaning: Vancouver Television

Technical information
- Licensing authority: CRTC
- ERP: 33 kW
- HAAT: 740.3 m (2,429 ft)
- Transmitter coordinates: 49°21′26″N 122°57′13″W

Links
- Website: www.ctvnews.ca/vancouver/

CIVT-DT (channel 32, cable channel 9) is a television station in Vancouver, British Columbia, Canada, serving as the West Coast flagship of the CTV Television Network, a division of Bell Media. It is sister to Victoria-based CTV2 outlet CIVI-DT, channel 53 (although the two stations nominally maintain separate operations). CIVT-DT's studios are located at 969 Robson Street (alternatively known as 750 Burrard Street) in downtown Vancouver, and its transmitter is atop Mount Seymour in the district municipality of North Vancouver.

CIVT went on the air in 1997 as the first new Vancouver TV station in 21 years after the Canadian Radio-television and Telecommunications Commission selected the application of Baton Broadcasting from among five bids. Originally known as Vancouver Television (VTV), the station was a young-skewing outlet intended to reflect an increasingly multicultural Vancouver and stimulate television production in British Columbia. In addition to local news and arts programming, CIVT produced programs seen nationally, including a talk show hosted by Vicki Gabereau and the police procedural drama Cold Squad.

Concurrently with the launch of CIVT, Baton Broadcasting acquired the CTV network. This purchase, plus an ownership change at longtime CTV affiliate CHAN-TV that saw it become owned by the Global Television Network, led to a major television realignment in 2001 under which CIVT became the new CTV station for the province and the only CTV station on Canada's west coast. In switching to CTV, the station moved toward attracting an older audience. It also improved its news ratings, generally becoming the second-rated station for local news after CHAN.

== History ==
=== Licensing ===
By the mid-1990s, nearly two decades had passed since Vancouver had last received a new television station—CKVU-TV in 1976. A 1977 CRTC study found that, under its projections, Vancouver would need seven additional TV stations by 2001, including three new English-language commercial outlets as well as a multilingual station focused on ethnic communities in the region. While population growth mostly followed the CRTC's projections from that time, the growth in the television station industry had not. The three existing major stations in Vancouver—CBC station CBUT, CHAN-TV (known as BCTV), and CKVU-TV—were coming under increasing scrutiny as being not adequately reflective of an increasingly diverse community. In a July 1996 column, Robert Mason Lee of The Globe and Mail noted that BCTV had the "dangerous arrogance of a local-news gorilla", called CBUT's news product "wholesome" but noted that the local CBC station "has neither the money nor the authority to produce local television". He also labeled CKVU as "deplorable", "paving the road to hell", and "cheap and undeserving of Vancouver". There was also a decided sentiment in the growing British Columbia film and television production community that there were no decision-making entities in Vancouver. Producers in British Columbia derided the "$1,500 cup of coffee"—the meetings, complete with airfare, that Vancouver creatives had to make with Toronto leaders to get approval for their proposals.

The process that led to the launch of CIVT began when Rogers Communications and CanWest Global Communications filed separate applications with the Canadian Radio-television and Telecommunications Commission (CRTC) in August 1995 and January 1996, respectively, to launch new television stations in the Vancouver–Victoria market. In line with the commission's usual practice, the CRTC issued a general call for applications in March 1996, with a public hearing that September. In all, five applications were considered:

- Rogers proposed a multicultural station on channel 32—similar to its CFMT-TV in Toronto—to be known as "CFMV" and replace an existing regional specialty channel, Talentvision. Sixty percent of the programs on CFMV would be in Asian languages. Several Korean Canadians protested the Rogers bid because, in converting from a specialty channel to a broadcast service, Rogers proposed to cut Korean output from 14 hours a week to 30 minutes.
- CanWest, then-owner of what is now the Global Television Network, proposed a new station in Victoria, in parallel to its existing Vancouver station CKVU-TV (channel 10). It believed this would make the company more competitive against the market's existing twinstick of CHAN-TV (channel 8) and CHEK-TV (channel 6) under the ownership of Western International Communications (WIC). The proposed CanWest service, VITV ("Vancouver Island Television"), would have transmitters in Victoria and Courtenay.
- Three other companies each proposed to launch a new, local independent station focused on Vancouver:
  - The Baton/Electrohome Alliance (a partnership between two of the largest CTV affiliate owners) proposed CIVT-TV on channel 42, focusing on providing a more diverse view of the city and 12.5 hours a week of local news coverage.
  - CHUM Limited (owner of Toronto's CITY-TV), would have started VTV ("Vancouver Television") on transmitters in Vancouver (channel 32) and Victoria (channel 29), promising to duplicate the Citytv formula on the West Coast. Sitting BC premier Glen Clark endorsed the CHUM application.
  - Craig Broadcast Systems (owner of two stations in Manitoba and shortly thereafter licensed to launch two more in Alberta) sought to start a service known as "Very Independent Television" (VITV) broadcast on UHF in Vancouver and Victoria. It would have multilingual news service producing English, Mandarin, and Punjabi-language news programs (with the latter two in the dinner hour) and a nightly entertainment show named Yaletown.

The commission's decision, released on January 31, 1997, approved only the Baton–Electrohome application. The prospective Rogers station was denied largely because it would have replaced some of Talentvision's existing ethnic programming with U.S. syndicated fare. Moreover, Talentvision's existing owner (the company now known as Fairchild Media Group) indicated there was "no plan to abandon [the current Talentvision licence] at this time". For CanWest, the commission determined that the existence of the CHAN/CHEK twinstick did not justify licensing a new station to a company already serving the market.

The three proposals for an independent station in Vancouver were determined to be high-calibre. The deciding factor in favour of Baton/Electrohome was a commitment to air new Vancouver-produced programming (which manifested as programs such as Gabereau Live!, The Camilla Scott Show, and Cold Squad) across all of Baton's and Electrohome's stations, a promise that the smaller CHUM and Craig station groups could not match. The decision had a mixed reception in the entertainment community; Baton's large commitment to Canadian programming was praised by the production industry, but others generally backed the CHUM application, and several people wished the CRTC had awarded multiple stations.

=== "Vancouver Television" ===
The station's logo as Vancouver Television or VTV, used from 1997 to 2001.

Construction and planning for CIVT began immediately after the licence was awarded. In March, Baton secured space in a former public library at Robson and Burrard streets; the space had been planned as an arcade, but the proposal was rejected by Vancouver's city council days before the CRTC decision. Ivan Fecan, the chief executive of Baton, led much of the early planning effort. Fecan had been the former program head of CBC television and a former protégé of Moses Znaimer, founder of CITY-TV, whose format was a major inspiration for the new Vancouver station; he described the CIVT format as how City might look "if it was moved from Queen Street to Bloor and Yonge". Znaimer claimed that Fecan had stolen CITY's format for CIVT. In July, channel 9 was assigned as its designation on Lower Mainland cable systems. Occupancy of the Robson and Burrard studios, which were designed by Vancouver firm James Cheng Architects, was granted with only a week until launch, with delays owing to waivers needed to place satellite dishes on the heritage building's roof and a strike of city workers that delayed permitting.

For news coverage, Baton counted on the services of former BCTV news director Cameron Bell in the application phase, and BCTV assignment editor Clive Jackson left after 18 years to join CIVT. As with the rest of the new station's mandate, the newsroom aimed to focus on Vancouver's diversity with an emphasis on the Asian community, which was perceived to be underrepresented by the existing Vancouver television stations. News bureaus were set up in communities around the Lower Mainland and on Vancouver Island—Victoria, North Vancouver, Burnaby, Port Coquitlam, Surrey, and Richmond—staffed with multilingual reporters. Baton seconded programming executive Susanne Boyce to Vancouver to manage the startup of CIVT's non-news programming.

The impending start of CIVT was impacting the television industry in Canada. When WIC carried out a round of layoffs in April 1997, analysts ascribed the reasoning to the new competition forthcoming in Vancouver. When the licence was awarded, BCTV was buying 18 hours a week of programs from Baton's Baton Broadcast System (BBS) division, consisting of 12 hours of American series and six hours of Canadian productions. These shows, including Melrose Place, Home Improvement, and Cosby, moved to CIVT. Baton also owned the Canadian rights to some programs that CKVU aired in the Vancouver market. The entertainment schedule was rounded out by several CTV cast-off shows.

CIVT, branded as Vancouver Television (VTV), began broadcasting on September 22, 1997; the channel changed from 42 to 32 prior to launch. The station's local programs at launch included a two-hour morning show, Vancouver Breakfast, and Vancouver Live newscasts at noon, 6 p.m., and 11 p.m., as well as Gabereau Live!, a talk show hosted by former local CBC radio personality Vicki Gabereau, and several weekly news and political satire programs, including former CBC Radio staple Double Exposure. Vancouver Breakfast, hosted by Aamer Haleem, Linda Freeman, and radio DJ Ted Schredd, featured a set adorned with chairs and props shaped like strawberries, bacon, and eggs; Alex Strachan of The Vancouver Sun called it "an alarm clock that wouldn't stop ringing". The 6 p.m. Vancouver Live was co-anchored by former MuchMusic VJ Monika Deol.

As construction on CIVT finished and the station began operation, Baton initiated a series of transactions that gave it control of the CTV Television Network, Canada's largest private TV network. In August 1997, Baton bought Electrohome's broadcasting assets in exchange for a 23-percent voting interest. Two months later, the company executed an asset swap with CHUM by which two Ontario stations were sold in exchange for CHUM's CTV-aligned operation in the Maritimes. These deals gave Baton controlling interest in CTV, which had once been structured on a cooperative basis. To complete its ownership, Baton spent $42 million to purchase the CTV shares held by WIC (as owner of BCTV, the provincial CTV affiliate) and Moffat Communications, owner of the CTV affiliate in Winnipeg; in 1998, the company renamed itself CTV Inc. BCTV held a continuing affiliation agreement with the CTV network through August 1999, and its CEO promised no near-term changes to the station.

When VTV first went on the air they were trying to create a streetwise, in-your-face imitation of Citytv, but it was always somebody else trying to get Citytv right for this market. And Baton were the wrong people to do that.

— David Stanger, Vancouver advertising agency executive

Baton's deals for CTV impacted VTV. Daryl Duke, an influential Vancouver film director who had founded CKVU in 1976 and backed the Baton–Electrohome bid because he felt it granted the most local control of any of the five original proposals, resigned in October. He claimed the station's advisory board was a legal fiction due to changes in company composition and that he was a "director of hot air". Catherine Murray, a faculty member at Simon Fraser University, also resigned. Analysis of VTV's first year in operation was mixed. Murray criticized VTV as a clone of Citytv where original Canadian shows were consigned to "schedule ghettos" in less-viewed dayparts, and a disillusioned Duke noted that "everything they do locally is noisy pursuit of raucous trivia". Overall station ratings showed little growth from the audience VTV drew at its launch, although programs were receiving praise. Despite ratings that trailed the CBC, a longtime laggard for the Vancouver news audience, Vancouver Live at 6 was named Canada's best newscast by the Radio-Television News Directors Association, and the twelve Gemini Awards nominations for VTV programs exceeded the combined total of some other station groups. Advertisers welcomed the concomitant increase in inventory brought by the new station. Beginning in 1998, the station obtained the local telecast rights to Vancouver Canucks hockey—which had been held by BCTV for 27 years— and Vancouver Grizzlies basketball. The noon newscast was dropped, but a 5 p.m. newscast was added.

VTV's early years were marked by turmoil and turnover in on-air personalities and management. Deol left within a year to spend more time with her family. In December 1998, management hired an external candidate for news director. This led to several resignations, including Jackson, who returned to BCTV; the move was seen to decrease morale. Some turnover among news reporters and anchors marked promotions, such as Satinder Bindra, who left VTV to join CNN. News anchor Paul Mennier left for A-Channel Edmonton, in part because of disgust with the continued low ratings; Mi-Jung Lee served as his replacement. In 1999, the newscasts were retitled as VTV News, coinciding with a shuffling of the anchor lineup.

=== From VTV to CTV ===
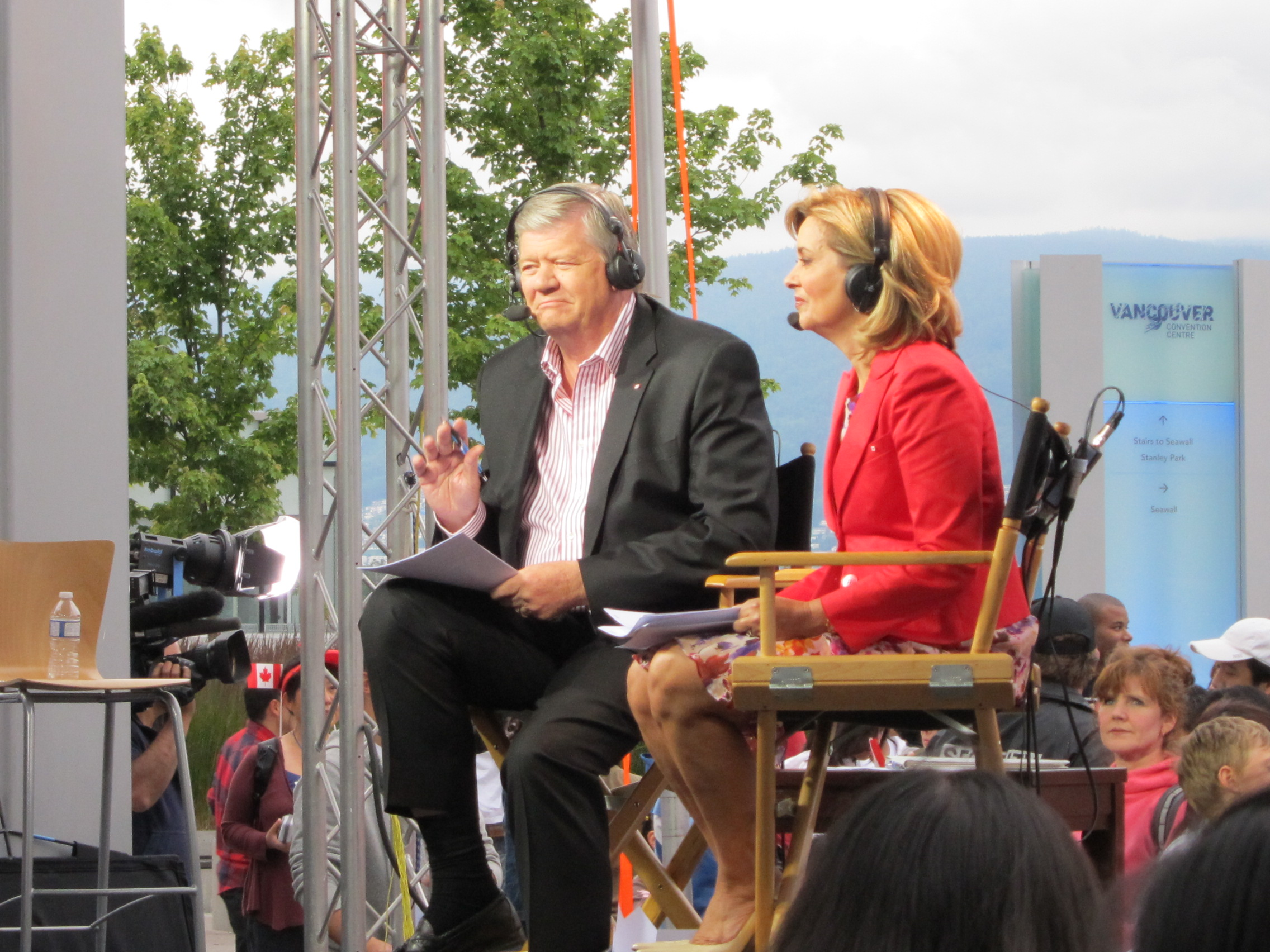
Bill Good and Pamela Martin defected from BCTV to serve as the main news anchors for CIVT when it switched to CTV.

In 1999, CanWest and Shaw Communications ended a year-long dispute for the assets of Western International Communications, parent of BCTV. In the deal, WIC's television holdings, among them BCTV, were sold to CanWest. CanWest already owned CKVU, and it was expected to have to sell one of CHAN or CKVU by the CRTC. CTV expressed interest in the possibility of acquiring the dominant BCTV but CanWest announced in February 2000 that it would sell CKVU, the existing Global station. That decision—which set up an affiliation switch to take place in 2001, postponed a year at the CRTC's direction—was understood as making CIVT the new CTV station in British Columbia. It caused a significant amount of program shuffling between BCTV and VTV for various series to which CTV held the rights. On September 1, 2001, CIVT-TV became "BC CTV", adopting a format and philosophy in line with the rest of the CTV network and a name that seemed intended to be similar to BCTV.

As part of the CTV switch, in lieu of chasing younger viewers, the station focused on adults 25–54. Typifying the shift was CIVT securing the services of BCTV news anchors Pamela Martin and Bill Good to anchor the new CTV newscasts. As CIVT had no over-the-air rebroadcasters in the rest of British Columbia, CTV's reach was diminished and Global's expanded. The CRTC authorized many cable providers throughout the province to carry CIVT for the first time, ensuring the continuity of CTV programming on cable in areas where CHAN had previously provided it. After the switch to CTV, CIVT's early evening newscast supplanted that of CKVU-TV as the second-place program in the market.

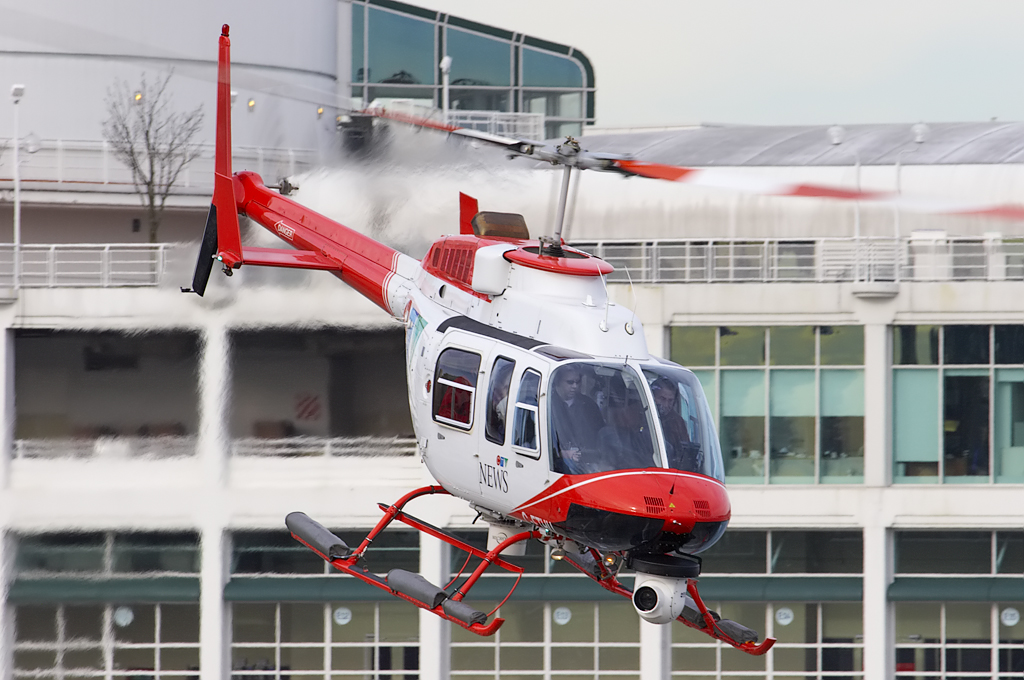
CIVT's news helicopter Chopper 9 (a Bell 206 L-4 Long Ranger IV) taking off from the Vancouver Harbour helipad.

In 2004, CIVT introduced "Chopper 9", the first full-time news helicopter in Vancouver. In January 2008, CTV produced a Western Canada edition of Canada AM at the CIVT studios, hosted by Rena Heer; due to low ratings, it was cancelled in June of that year. Canada AM aired until 2011, when CTV's stations in Western Canada launched local morning newscasts known as CTV Morning Live; a noon newscast was also added at that time. In March 2010, the station unveiled an updated studio for its newscasts, incorporating components from the studio from CTV's coverage of the 2010 Winter Olympics.

On December 7, 2010, Good and Martin announced their resignation as anchors of the 6 p.m. newscast as, amongst negotiations for contract renewals, they did not want to agree to long-term commitments due to their ages; Good also cut back to his radio show on CKNW. Mike Killeen and Tamara Taggart were announced as their replacements the next day and took over as anchors of the broadcast on January 3, 2011. Taggart—who had been at the station since its launch as VTV—and Killeen were let go as the main CTV News Vancouver at Six anchors in April 2018. Lee and Roberts were named replacement anchors; Roberts was dismissed in 2022, and Lee became the sole anchor for the 6 p.m. program.

CTV Vancouver was the first Canadian television station to win a Edward R. Murrow Award for overall excellence in a large market from the U.S. Radio Television Digital News Association, doing so in 2016.

As part of a round of cuts across Bell Media in June 2023, co-owned CIVI-DT (channel 53) in Victoria ceased presenting its own local newscasts; these were replaced with a single half-hour 4:30 p.m. newscast (repeated at 6:00 and 11:00 p.m.) on weekdays, anchored from Vancouver. CTV Vancouver's weekend evening and weekday noon newscasts were canceled in another round of cuts in February 2024.

=== Notable former on-air staff ===
- Rob Brown — anchor and reporter
- James Duthie — sportscaster, 1997–1998
- Blake Price — weekend sports anchor
- Jody Vance — sportscaster

== Technical information ==
=== Subchannel ===
Subchannels of CIVT-DT
Subchannel	Res.	Short name	Programming
32.1	1080i	CIVT	CTV

=== Analog-to-digital conversion ===
CIVT's digital signal began broadcasting in 2005. CIVT shut down its analog signal, over UHF channel 32, on August 31, 2011, the official date on which Canadian television stations in CRTC-designated mandatory markets transitioned from analog to digital broadcasts. The station's digital signal relocated from its pre-transition UHF channel 33 to its analog-era UHF channel 32 for post-transition operations.
