= CFBT-FM =

Radio station in Vancouver

- Vancouver, British Columbia; Canada
- Broadcast area: Greater Vancouver
- Frequency: 94.5 MHz (HD Radio)
- Branding: 94.5 Virgin Radio

Programming
- Language: English
- Format: Contemporary hit radio
- Affiliations: Premiere Networks

Ownership
- Owner: Bell Media; (Bell Media Radio, G.P.)
- Sister stations: CHQM-FM, CIVT-DT

History
- First air date: February 15, 2002
- Call sign meaning: Station launched as "The Beat"

Technical information
- Class: C
- ERP: 46,500 watts average 90,000 watts peak horizontal polarization only
- HAAT: 617.6 metres (2,026 ft)
- Transmitter coordinates: 49.354252°N 122.958308°W

Links
- Website: iheartradio.ca/virginradio/vancouver

CFBT-FM (94.5 MHz) is a commercial radio station in Vancouver, British Columbia, Canada. Owned by Bell Media, the station broadcasts a contemporary hit radio format branded as 94.5 Virgin Radio. The radio studios and offices are at Robson and Burrard Street in Downtown Vancouver. CFBT is also the default top 40 station for nearby Bellingham, Washington, as there are no top 40 stations targeting that area.

CFBT has an effective radiated power (ERP) of 45,000 watts (90,000 watts peak, horizontal polarization only). The transmitter is on Mount Seymour in the District of North Vancouver.

== History ==
=== Urban and Rhythmic ===
The 94.5 frequency was originally assigned as a low-power temporary travellers' information station to provide reports on traffic conditions between Vancouver and Coquitlam, which received approval in 1998. The CRTC began the application process for a new full-power FM station on the 94.5 frequency in the fall of 2000. There were eleven prospective applicants, reflecting the fact that the 94.5 frequency was the last remaining high-power FM slot in the Vancouver market.

On June 5, 2001, Focus Communications was granted a licence to operate an urban contemporary format. Focus chose the call sign CFBT-FM to reflect the station's moniker, "The Beat". The call letters were assigned in November of the same year. Test transmissions began in mid-February 2002. An official launch date was set for March 4, making CFBT-FM the second urban station in Canada. The station adopted a "soft start" launch wherein announcers and programming were gradually introduced over a period of several weeks. By mid-2003, the station changed to more of a rhythmic contemporary format.

=== Switch to Top 40 ===
In September 2004, CFBT changed to a Top 40/CHR format, significantly decreasing the amount of hip hop and R&B on the station's playlist. This change was prompted by the shift of CKZZ-FM to its current Hot AC format earlier that year.

CFBT became the only Top 40 station in British Columbia until 2007. The station continued to lean rhythmic for about a year, before adopting a more mainstream direction. More rhythmic tracks were phased in by 2007, when CTVglobemedia acquired the station.

=== Ownership changes ===
On February 26, 2007, CHUM Limited, which also owned CHQM-FM, CFUN and CKST, announced that it would acquire CFBT-FM from the Focus Entertainment Group. The CRTC approved the sale in October, and CTVglobemedia (CHUM's successor) assumed ownership on November 2, 2007.

The station was sold to Bell Canada in 2011, along with most CTVglobemedia stations/channels. The CHUM Radio Network subsidiary became Bell Media Radio.

On April 25, 2012, Bell Media announced a new morning show, The Beat Mornings with Holly Conway, Jonny Staub, Nira Arora and Amy Beeman, to start on April 30. Former morning show host Kid Carson left the station and joined CKKS-FM in September after his non-compete contract expired.

=== Virgin Radio ===
On February 20, 2015, Bell announced that CFBT would rebrand as 94.5 Virgin Radio on March 5. The rebranding returned the "Virgin" brand to the market for the first time since March 2014, when CKZZ-FM rebranded back to its former "Z" moniker due to Bell's merger with CKZZ's then-owner Astral Media, with Bell retaining the rights to the "Virgin" branding in Canada.

On March 5, at 9 a.m., the official rebranding to 94.5 Virgin Radio took place. The last song on "The Beat" was "Jealous" by Chromeo, while the first song on "Virgin" was "Uptown Funk" by Mark Ronson and Bruno Mars.

== Previous logos ==
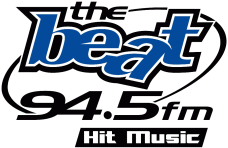
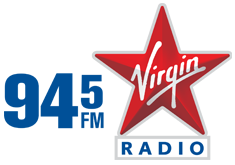
