= CJSF-FM =

Radio station at Simon Fraser University in Burnaby, British Columbia

- Burnaby, British Columbia; Canada
- Broadcast area: Greater Vancouver
- Frequency: 90.1 MHz
- Branding: CJSF 90.1 FM

Programming
- Format: Public broadcasting

Ownership
- Owner: Simon Fraser University; (Simon Fraser Campus Radio Society)

History
- First air date: February 14, 2003
- Call sign meaning: Simon Fraser

Technical information
- Class: A
- ERP: 450 watts
- HAAT: 207.4 metres (680 ft)
- Transmitter coordinates: 49.279677°N 122.918529°W

Links
- Webcast: Listen live
- Website: www.cjsf.ca

CJSF-FM is a college radio station from Simon Fraser University in Burnaby, British Columbia. The station features a wide range of genres, from spoken word politics to heavy metal music shows. Its transmitter is located atop Burnaby Mountain.

== Station overview ==
CJSF is a non-profit, volunteer-run, campus/community radio station that broadcasts from Simon Fraser University in Burnaby, British Columbia. CJSF broadcasts to Simon Fraser University (SFU) and to the surrounding communities of Burnaby, New Westminster, Coquitlam, Port Coquitlam, Port Moody, Surrey, Richmond and Delta in British Columbia on the FM band. CJSF is also available on the Internet at CJSF.ca. CJSF is on-air seven days per week, 24 hours per day. Station program are also available as downloadable audio files and podcasts.

As a campus/community radio station, CJSF broadcasts music and spoken word programming that is rarely found in mainstream media. Programs concern the current issues and news affairs of such groups as First Nations, ethnic minorities, LGBT, environmental, and social justice. CJSF plays a variety of music including indie, ethnic, soundtrack, underground, and world music that are not often broadcast on commercial stations. Periodically, it broadcasts Simon Fraser Red Leafs varsity athletic events. All programming at CJSF Radio adheres to the Broadcasting Act and the Canadian Radio-television and Telecommunications Commission (CRTC).

== Station history ==
CJSF Radio has been in operation since the early years of Simon Fraser University. CJSF began as a music club, and evolved into an unlicensed radio station that broadcast through a series of speakers placed around campus.

In 1974, a group of volunteers initiated a non-profit society to launch a radio station. Subsequently, the Simon Fraser Campus Radio Society (SFCRS) was established and registered under the Society Act of BC. The SFCRS remains the organization that runs CJSF Radio today.

CJSF has survived several stages of broadcast development since its origins as an unlicensed radio station. The first major development occurred in 1980 with an application to the Canadian Radio-television and Telecommunications Commission – the CRTC – when the station obtained an AM broadcasting licence to broadcast to the Shell and Louis Riel Residence Houses on Burnaby Mountain campus using a Carrier current system. The radio station acquired a spot at 93.9 FM cable 1985, which delivered CJSF to new listeners in the Lower Mainland through various cable systems.

In October 1987, CJSF Radio (known as CJIV from 1984–1992) made its first application to the CRTC for an FM broadcasting licence to replace the AM/cable FM licence. On February 23, 1989, station members attended a CRTC hearing at Hotel Vancouver, but were denied an FM broadcasting licence shortly thereafter.

In the years between 1987 and the early nineties, CJSF Radio renewed its efforts to provide alternative programming that differed from commercial radio.

In June 1998, CJSF applied for another FM licence to broadcast on one of the few remaining frequencies available in the Lower Mainland. On June 5, 2001, the CRTC granted the station its broadcast licence.

In early 2003, CJSF finally debuted on the FM dial at 90.1, and went on to receive the 2004 Standard Radio Awards of Excellence in Campus and Community Broadcasting awarded annually by the National Campus and Community Radio Association.

Throughout this process, the station has developed into a campus/community radio station that provides a diverse mixture of music and spoken word programs.
