= CJAX-FM =

Radio station in Vancouver, Canada

- Vancouver, British Columbia; Canada
- Broadcast area: Greater Vancouver
- Frequency: 96.9 MHz (HD Radio)
- Branding: Jack 96.9

Programming
- Format: Adult hits

Ownership
- Owner: Rogers Radio; (Rogers Media, Inc.)
- Sister stations: CKKS-FM, CKVU-DT, CHNM-DT

History
- First air date: March 1, 1980
- Former call signs: CJAZ-FM (1980–1985); CKKS-FM (1985–2002); CKLG-FM (2002–2014)
- Former frequencies: 92.1 MHz (1980–1982)
- Call sign meaning: Sounds like "Jack"

Technical information
- Class: C
- ERP: 32,000 watts; 70,000 watts maximum
- HAAT: 707.4 metres (2,321 ft)
- Transmitter coordinates: 49.357365°N 122.953776°W
- Repeater: CJAX-FM-1 96.9 (Whistler)

Links
- Webcast: Listen live
- Website: jack969.com

CJAX-FM (96.9 MHz) is a commercial radio station in Vancouver, British Columbia. Owned by Rogers Radio, a division of Rogers Sports & Media, it broadcasts an adult hits format branded as "Jack 96.9". Its studios are at 2440 Ash Street in the Fairview neighbourhood of Vancouver. CJAX was the first conventional radio station in North America to adopt the "Jack" branding, officially classified as "variety hits" or "adult hits". Most "Jack" stations play a wide mix of music from the late 60s through the 90s, as well as some current and recent adult contemporary and hot adult contemporary singles.

CJAX-FM is a Class C station with an effective radiated power (ERP) of 32,000 watts (70,000 watts maximum). The transmitter is atop Mount Seymour in the District of North Vancouver. Programming is simulcast on a 1,430-watt repeater, 96.9 CJAX-FM-1 in Whistler.

== History ==
=== Jazz and Urban AC ===
The station signed on the air on March 1, 1980, as CJAZ-FM, owned by Selkirk Communications alongside CKWX (1130 AM). It aired a hybrid format of jazz music and "magazine programming"—news and features. It transmitted from Salt Spring Island at 100,000 watts. Although overall regional coverage was very good, poor stereo reception in the key Vancouver area and such suburbs as New Westminster and North Burnaby caused the station to lose $50,000 a month while requesting a new frequency from the Canadian Radio-television and Telecommunications Commission. It was in last place among Vancouver FM stations in the ratings a year after going on the air. At the start of December 1982, CJAZ-FM switched its frequency to 96.9 MHz and relocated its transmitter to Mount Seymour. It was known as FM97 on air.

Low ratings for its jazz format led to a format change to adult contemporary in May 1985 and a call sign change to CKKS-FM.

=== Adult contemporary ===
In 1986, CKKS began playing adult contemporary music with an on-air rebranding to 97 Kiss FM. Four years later, the station was sold to Maclean-Hunter Ltd., and in 1994, it became a part of Rogers Broadcasting. Rival station CHQM-FM dropped its easy listening format in 1992, also switching to an adult contemporary format. Its ratings surpassed CKKS as Vancouver's leading AC station, becoming Vancouver's most-listened-to FM station later on.

In 1988, the West Coast Community T.V. Association received CRTC approval to add a low-power transmitter at 102.7 MHz in Ucluelet to rebroadcast the programming of CKKS-FM. The call sign for the Ucluelet transmitter (currently dark) is CIWC-FM.

Former Jack FM logo, used from 2002-2012.

=== Jack-FM ===
In early December of 2002, the station switched to Christmas music for the holidays. On Boxing Day, at 8 a.m., CKKS flipped to adult hits as Jack FM. The first song on "Jack" was "You Shook Me All Night Long" by AC/DC. The change ended the ten-year AC war in Vancouver, which meant that CHQM-FM became the only mainstream AC station in the Vancouver market.

Given the "attitude" inherent in the "Jack" brand, management felt that the call letters "CKKS" would maintain an undesirable association with Kiss-FM's "soft favourites" identity. As it turned out, in 2001, Corus Entertainment had abandoned the old CKLG call sign formerly assigned to one of its Vancouver AM stations (Mojo AM 730). Rogers applied to transfer these letters to Jack FM, and the station's call sign became CKLG-FM shortly thereafter. This was in part an attempt to trade on CKLG-AM's history as a popular Vancouver music station in the 1960s, 1970s, and 1980s. The move was successful, as Jack-FM's ratings increased dramatically, at one point briefly surpassing traditional market leader CKNW before settling into the upper rankings in the Vancouver market. (The CKKS call sign was subsequently given to a Sechelt rebroadcaster of CISQ-FM in Squamish, British Columbia.)

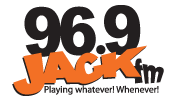
Former Jack FM logo, used from 2012-2017.

In July 2012, the station adopted the "Playing Whatever! Whenever!" slogan. The station also added in more recent adult contemporary and hot adult contemporary songs. In 2014, the call letters were changed again, this time to CJAX-FM to reflect the "Jack" branding.

In 2020 the station added Justin "Drex" Wilcomes as its morning host. In fall 2022 he had to take several weeks off from CJAQ after suffering a heart attack and undergoing surgery. but was back on air by spring 2023. His Jack FM show was cancelled in April 2024.

In January 2025, Ronnie Stanton joined the team as lead music director and has driven the ratings from a #13 to #5.

=== Controversy ===
In 2005, some members of Vancouver's Indo-Canadian community accused the station of racial insensitivity. They objected to 96.9 Jack-FM's advertising strategy.

The ads in question featured Vijay Chandra, a Fijian radio engineer for the station with a strong South Asian accent, singing to promote Jack-FM's "Larry and Willy show". The complaints stemmed from a perception that viewers are intended to laugh at Chandra's accent, rather than at the ad copy itself, and that similar lyrics performed without an accent would not be considered humorous.

=== HD Radio ===
In May 2016, CJAX began broadcasting using HD Radio technology. On June 23, 2016, CJAX added a simulcast of all-news sister station CKWX on its HD2 digital subchannel. On August 28, 2017, CJAX added a simulcast of co-owned sports radio station CISL to its HD3 subchannel. The HD Radio feed of CISL and CKWX ended when the stations were shut down by Rogers on July 7, 2026.
