= CHQM-FM =

Radio station in Vancouver

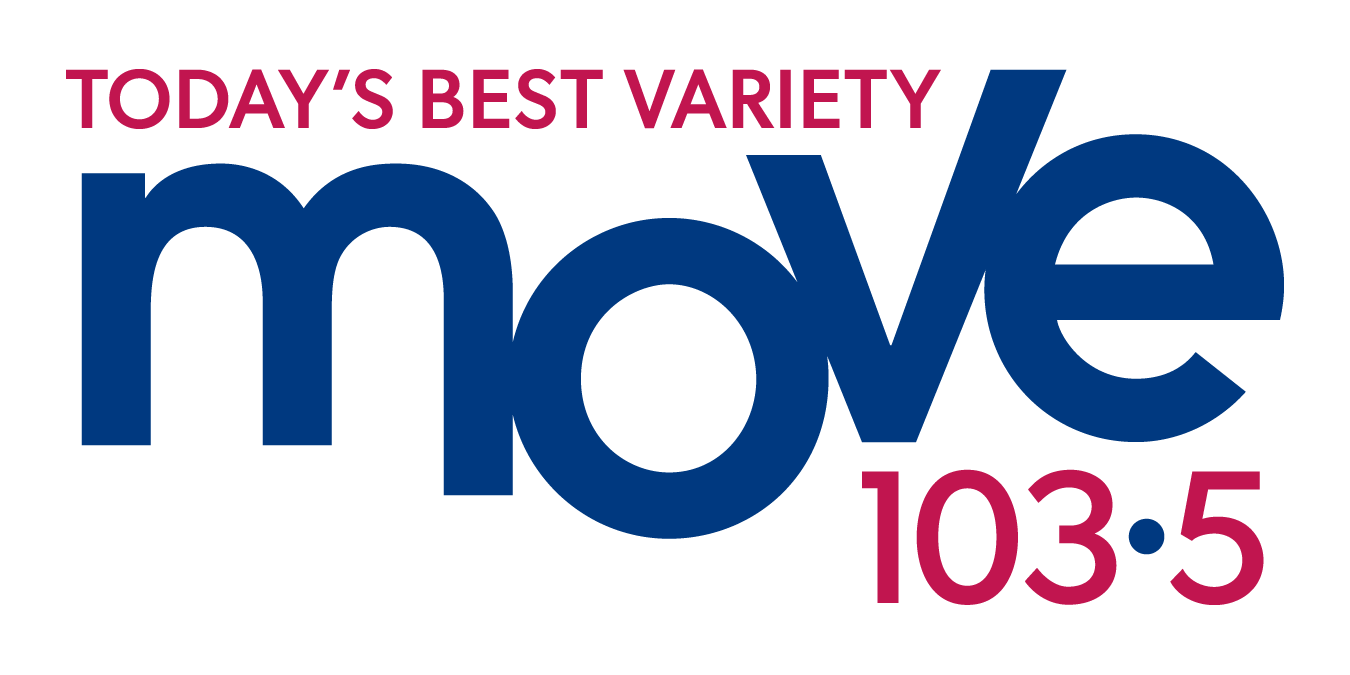
- Vancouver, British Columbia; Canada
- Broadcast area: Greater Vancouver
- Frequency: 103.5 MHz (HD Radio)
- Branding: Move 103.5

Programming
- Format: Adult contemporary
- Subchannels: HD2: Pure Country; HD3: Silent (previously CFTE)

Ownership
- Owner: Bell Media; (Bell Media British Columbia Radio Partnership)
- Sister stations: CFBT-FM, CIVT-DT

History
- First air date: August 10, 1960
- Call sign meaning: Formerly used at 1320 AM and said to stand for "Canada's Highest Quality Music"

Technical information
- Class: C
- ERP: 53,000 watts average 100,000 watts peak Horizontal polarization only
- HAAT: 617.6 metres (2,026 ft)
- Transmitter coordinates: 49.354252°N 122.958308°W

Links
- Website: moveradio.ca/vancouver/

CHQM-FM (103.5 FM) is a Canadian radio station in Vancouver, British Columbia. It broadcasts with an effective radiated power of 100,000 watts from a transmitter on Mount Seymour and airs an adult contemporary format. It is owned by Bell Media. CHQM's studio is located at 750 Burrard Street in Downtown Vancouver.

The station is carried on Shaw Direct channel 509, and also carried on Telus Optik TV channel 7025.

== History ==
CHQM-FM signed on the air on August 10, 1960 with a mainly instrumental easy listening format, several months after its original AM sister station, CHQM (whose programming CHQM-FM mainly simulcast), first went on-air on December 7, 1959. The original owner of CHQM-AM and -FM was Vancouver Broadcast Associates Ltd., headed by Bill Bellman and Jack Stark, with the stations' studios and offices, then located on 1134 Burrard Street.

On November 4, 1961, CHQM-FM began broadcasting in stereo, and was authorized by the Board of Broadcast Governors (predecessor of the Canadian Radio-television and Telecommunications Commission) to increase its transmission power from 18,950 watts to 100,000 in 1963. The transmitter site was moved from Grouse Mountain to Mount Seymour at this time. CHQM-FM was the second private radio station in Canada to transmit in stereo (after CFRB-FM/Toronto), and it was the first in the nation to transmit an SCMO subcarrier ("Q Music"). This subcarrier was used to transmit background music to stores and businesses throughout the Lower Mainland, and it helped support the FM station during the difficult first two decades when FM audiences were small. Parent company Vancouver Broadcast Associates changed its corporate name to Q Broadcasting Ltd. on August 23, 1969.

The two owners had a dispute, and each struggled to control Q Broadcasting through the mid-1970s. In 1979, Stark assumed complete control of the company. Bellman moved on to become a major shareholder in fledgling CKVU-DT, also in Vancouver.

Logo used until August 2015. With minor design variations, this logo had been used since the station first signed on in August 1960.

CHUM Limited acquired CHQM-AM and -FM on October 17, 1990, on condition from the CRTC that CHUM sell either CHQM-AM or its other Vancouver AM station, CFUN (regulations of the time allowed media companies to own only one AM and one FM station in a particular market in Canada); CHQM-AM was sold, while the FM made a gradual switch from its longtime beautiful music format to its current format over a six-month period between March and September of 1992, giving Vancouver two adult contemporary stations (the other being CKKS, now CJAX-FM).

On July 12, 2006, CTVglobemedia announced it would acquire CHUM Limited, which includes CHQM-FM. The transaction was approved by the CRTC (on condition that CKVU, which had also been acquired by CHUM in 2001, be sold to Rogers Communications) on June 8, 2007, and CHQM-FM became a CTVglobemedia station on June 22. CTVglobemedia became Bell Media in 2011.

On December 27, 2020, as part of a mass format reorganization by Bell Media, CHQM rebranded as Move 103.5, ending 60 years of the "QM FM" branding. While the station would run jockless for the first week of the format, on-air staff would return on January 4, 2021.

== HD Radio ==
In 2016, CHQM signed on HD Radio services, marking the first Bell Media station to do so. They also signed on HD2 and HD3 sub-channels, which air simulcasts of sisters CKST and CFTE, respectively.
