= Kindersley-Biggar =

Provincial electoral district in Saskatchewan, Canada

Coordinates: 51°40′N 109°20′W

Saskatchewan electoral district

Provincial electoral district
- Legislature: Legislative Assembly of Saskatchewan
MLA
Kim Gartner
Saskatchewan
- District created: 1938 (as "Kerrobert-Kindersley")
- First contested: 1938
- Last contested: 2024

Demographics
- Population (2016): 16,834
- Electors: 11,883
- Census division(s): Division 8, 13
- Census subdivision(s): Antelope Park No. 322, Brock, Chesterfield No. 261, Coleville, Denzil, Dodsland, Eatonia, Eston, Eye Hill No. 382, Flaxcombe, Grandview No. 349, Grass Lake No. 381, Heart's Hill No. 352, Kerrobert, Kindersley, Rural Municipality of Kindersley No. 290, Landis, Luseland, Macklin, Major, Marengo, Mariposa No. 350, Milton No. 292, Netherhill, Newcombe No. 260, Oakdale No. 320, Plenty, Prairiedale No. 321, Primate, Progress No. 351, Reford No. 379, Scott, Smiley, Snipe Lake No. 259, Tramping Lake Tramping Lake No. 380, Winslow No. 319

Kindersley-Biggar is a provincial electoral district for the Legislative Assembly of Saskatchewan, Canada. Created for the 9th Saskatchewan general election as Kerrobert-Kindersley, this constituency was renamed Kindersley for the 18th Saskatchewan general election in 1975 and Kindersley-Biggar for the 2024 general election.

The largest centre in the riding is the town of Kindersley (pop. 4,571). Other communities in the district include the towns of Kerrobert, Macklin, Eatonia, and Luseland; and the villages of Denzil, Marengo, Coleville, Tramping Lake, and Major.

For the 2024 election, the riding gained significant territory from Rosetown-Elrose and Biggar-Sask Valley centred around the town of Biggar, and lost a small area south of Kindersley to Cypress Hills. Accordingly, the riding will was renamed Kindersley-Biggar.

== Members of the Legislative Assembly ==
Legislature	Years	Member	Party
Kerrobert-Kindersley
9th	1938–1944	Donald Laing	Liberal
10th	1944–1948	John Wellbelove	Co-operative Commonwealth
11th	1948–1952	John Wellbelove	Co-operative Commonwealth
12th	1952–1956	John Wellbelove	Co-operative Commonwealth
13th	1956–1960	Eldon Arthur Johnson	Co-operative Commonwealth
14th	1960–1964	Eldon Arthur Johnson	Co-operative Commonwealth
15th	1964–1967	William S. Howes	Liberal
16th	1967–1971	William S. Howes	Liberal
17th	1971–1975	Alex Taylor	New Democratic
Kindersley
18th	1975–1978	Allan Neil McMillan	Liberal
19th	1978–1982	Robert Lynal Andrew	Progressive Conservative
20th	1982–1986	Robert Lynal Andrew	Progressive Conservative
21st	1986–1991	Robert Lynal Andrew	Progressive Conservative
22nd	1991–1995	Bill Boyd	Progressive Conservative
23rd	1995–1997	Bill Boyd	Progressive Conservative
23rd	1997–1999	Bill Boyd	Saskatchewan
24th	1999–2002	Bill Boyd	Saskatchewan
24th	2002–2003	Jason Dearborn	Saskatchewan
25th	2003–2007	Jason Dearborn	Saskatchewan
26th	2007–2011	Bill Boyd	Saskatchewan
27th	2011–2016	Bill Boyd	Saskatchewan
28th	2016–2017	Bill Boyd	Saskatchewan
28th	2017–2017	Bill Boyd	Independent
28th	2018–2020	Ken Francis	Saskatchewan
29th	2020–2024	Ken Francis	Saskatchewan
Kindersley-Biggar
30th	2024–Present	Kim Gartner	Saskatchewan

== Election results ==
2024 Saskatchewan general election
Party	Candidate	Votes	%	±%
Saskatchewan	Kim Gartner	5,749	76.8%	+2.7
New Democratic	Cindy Hoppe	1,223	16.3%	+8.4
Independent	Wade Sira	290	3.9%	
Green	Darcy Robilliard	115	1.5%	+0.3
Buffalo	Jeff Wortman	106	1.4%	-12.8
Total valid votes		7,483		
Total rejected ballots				
Turnout				
Eligible voters				
Saskatchewan hold		Swing		
Source: Elections Saskatchewan

2020 provincial election redistributed results
Party	%
Saskatchewan	74.1
Buffalo	14.3
New Democratic	7.9
Green	1.1

2020 Saskatchewan general election: Kindersley
Party	Candidate	Votes	%	±%
Saskatchewan	Ken Francis	5,269	74.40	-13.75
Buffalo	Jason R. Cooper	1,041	14.70	–
New Democratic	Steven Allen	508	7.17	-2.73
Progressive Conservative	Terry Sieben	194	2.74	-
Green	Evangeline Godron	70	0.99	-0.96
Total valid votes		7,082	99.69	
Total rejected ballots		22	0.31	–
Turnout		7,104		
Eligible voters				
Saskatchewan hold		Swing		
Source: Elections Saskatchewan

Saskatchewan provincial by-election, March 1, 2018: Kindersley
Party	Candidate	Votes	%	±%
Saskatchewan	Ken Francis	3,339	88.15	+20.20
New Democratic	Travis Hebert	375	9.90	+2.51
Green	Yvonne Potter-Pihach	74	1.95	-
Total valid votes		3,788	99.95	
Total rejected ballots		2	0.05	-0.40
Turnout		3,790	32.42	-27.32
Eligible voters		11,690		
Saskatchewan hold		Swing		+8.84

2016 Saskatchewan general election: Kindersley
Party	Candidate	Votes	%
Saskatchewan	Bill Boyd	4,802	67.95
Independent	Jason Dearborn	1,249	17.67
New Democratic	Charles Jedlicka	522	7.39
Progressive Conservative	Terry Smith	323	4.57
Liberal	Darren Donald	171	2.42
Total valid votes		7,067	99.55
Total rejected ballots		32	0.45
Turnout		7,099	59.74
Eligible voters		11,883	
Source: Elections Saskatchewan

2011 Saskatchewan general election, Kindersley electoral district
Party	Candidate	Votes	%	±%
Saskatchewan	Bill Boyd	4,502	79.71	+12.76
NDP	Peter Walker	907	16.06	-4.35
Green	Norbert Kratchmer	239	4.23	+1.38
Total valid votes		5,648	99.79	
Total rejected ballots		12	0.21	-0.16
Turnout		5,660	56.71	-9.52
Eligible voters		9,980		
Saskatchewan hold		Swing		+8.56
Source: Elections Saskatchewan

2007 Saskatchewan general election, Kindersley electoral district
Party	Candidate	Votes	%	±%
Saskatchewan	Bill Boyd	4,513	66.95	+6.44
NDP	Sarah Connor	1,376	20.41	-1.63
Liberal	Erhard Poggemiller	577	8.56	-8.89
Green	Norbert Kratchmer	192	2.85	–
Western Independence	Bruce Ritter	83	1.23	–
Total valid votes		6,741	99.63	
Total rejected ballots		25	0.37	+0.20
Turnout		6,766	66.23	+4.18
Eligible voters		10,216		
Saskatchewan hold		Swing		+4.04
Source: Elections Saskatchewan

2003 Saskatchewan general election: Kindersley
Party	Candidate	Votes	%
Saskatchewan	Jason Dearborn	3,960	60.50
NDP	Blair McDaid	1,443	22.05
Liberal	Del Price	1,142	17.45
Total valid votes		6,545	99.83
Total rejected ballots		11	0.17
Turnout		6,556	62.05
Eligible voters		10,565	
Source: Elections Saskatchewan

October 4, 2002 By-Election: Kindersley electoral district
Party	Candidate	Votes	%	±%
Saskatchewan	Jason Dearborn	2,919	61.55%	-1.93
Liberal	Del Price	1,026	21.64%	+5.53
NDP	Lee Pearce	797	16.81%	-3.60
Total		4,742	100.00%	

1999 Saskatchewan general election, Kindersley electoral district
Party	Candidate	Votes	%	±%
Saskatchewan	Bill Boyd	4,491	63.48%	–
NDP	Bill Rosher	1,444	20.41%	-4.04
Liberal	Vaughn Biberdorf	1,140	16.11%	-8.63
Total		7,075	100.00%	

1995 Saskatchewan general election, Kindersley electoral district
Party	Candidate	Votes	%	±%
Progressive Conservative	Bill Boyd	3,980	50.81%	+11.26
Liberal	Del Price	1,938	24.74%	-6.92
NDP	Mel Karlson	1,915	24.45%	-4.34
Total		7,833	100.00%	

1991 Saskatchewan general election, Kindersley electoral district
Party	Candidate	Votes	%	±%
Progressive Conservative	Bill Boyd	2,766	39.55%	-26.11
Liberal	Judy Setrakov	2,214	31.66%	+24.13
NDP	Lorne Johnston	2,014	28.79%	+1.98
Total		6,994	100.00%	

1986 Saskatchewan general election, Kindersley electoral district
Party	Candidate	Votes	%	±%
Progressive Conservative	Robert Andrew	4,882	65.66%	-2.33
NDP	Wayne Welte	1,993	26.81%	+2.89
Liberal	Phillip Johnson	560	7.53%	+5.36
Total		7,435	100.00%	

1982 Saskatchewan general election, Kindersley electoral district
Party	Candidate	Votes	%	±%
Progressive Conservative	Robert Andrew	5,211	67.99%	+29.31
NDP	Wayne G. Nargang	1,833	23.92%	-10.39
Western Canada Concept	Chuck McIntyre	454	5.92%	–
Liberal	Wayne Mah	166	2.17%	-24.84
Total		7,664	100.00%	

1978 Saskatchewan general election, Kindersley electoral district
Party	Candidate	Votes	%	±%
Progressive Conservative	Robert Andrew	2,774	38.68%	+6.64
NDP	David G. Thomson	2,461	34.31%	+2.63
Liberal	Allan McMillan	1,937	27.01%	-9.27
Total		7,172	100.00%	

1975 Saskatchewan general election, Kindersley electoral district
Party	Candidate	Votes	%	±%
Liberal	Allan McMillan	2,659	36.28%	-20.42
Progressive Conservative	Bayne Secord	2,348	32.04%	-
NDP	Alex Taylor	2,322	31.68%	-11.62
Total		7,329	100.00%	

=== Kerrobert-Kindersley ===
1971 Saskatchewan general election, Kerrobert-Kindersley electoral district
Party	Candidate	Votes	%	±%
NDP	Alex Taylor	3,209	51.57%	+8.27
Liberal	William S. Howes	3,014	48.43%	-8.27
Total		6,223	100.00%	

1967 Saskatchewan general election, Kerrobert-Kindersley electoral district
Party	Candidate	Votes	%	±%
Liberal	William S. Howes	3,499	56.70%	+0.30
NDP	Boyd Sadler	2,672	43.30%	-0.30
Total		6,171	100.00%	

1964 Saskatchewan general election, Kerrobert-Kindersley electoral district
Party	Candidate	Votes	%	±%
Liberal	William S. Howes	3,799	56.40%	+21.83
CCF	Eldon A. Johnson	2,937	43.60%	+7.61
Total		6,736	100.00%	

1960 Saskatchewan general election, Kerrobert-Kindersley electoral district
Party	Candidate	Votes	%	±%
CCF	Eldon A. Johnson	2,499	35.99%	-7.63
Liberal	John MacKenzie Henderson	2,400	34.57%	+1.23
Social Credit	Bennett Francisco	1,186	17.08%	-5.96
Prog. Conservative	Martin E. Cole	858	12.36%	-
Total		6,943	100.00%	

1956 Saskatchewan general election, Kerrobert-Kindersley electoral district
Party	Candidate	Votes	%	±%
CCF	Eldon A. Johnson	3,000	43.62%	-14.11
Liberal	John C. Clark	2,293	33.34%	-8.93
Social Credit	Bennett Francisco	1,585	23.04%	-
Total		6,878	100.00%	

1952 Saskatchewan general election, Kerrobert-Kindersley electoral district
Party	Candidate	Votes	%	±%
CCF	John Wellbelove	3,534	57.73%	+13.59
Liberal	Edward J. Reed	2,588	42.27%	+0.49
Total		6,122	100.00%	

1948 Saskatchewan general election, Kerrobert-Kindersley electoral district
Party	Candidate	Votes	%	±%
CCF	John Wellbelove	3,333	44.14%	-5.30
Liberal	Fred Larson	3,155	41.78%	+5.47
Social Credit	Norman Wildman	1,063	14.08%	-
Total		7,551	100.00%	

1944 Saskatchewan general election, Kerrobert-Kindersley electoral district
Party	Candidate	Votes	%	±%
CCF	John Wellbelove	3,236	49.44%	+31.87
Liberal	Donald Laing	2,377	36.31%	-11.94
Prog. Conservative	Wellington S. Myers	933	14.25%	–
Total		6,546	100.00%	

1938 Saskatchewan general election, Kerrobert-Kindersley electoral district
Party	Candidate	Votes	%	±%
Liberal	Donald Laing	3,298	48.25%	–
Social Credit	Robert M. Goodwin	2,336	34.18%	–
CCF	Frank Jaenicke	1,201	17.57%	–
Total		6,835	100.00%	

== See also ==
- List of Saskatchewan provincial electoral districts
- List of Saskatchewan general elections
- Canadian provincial electoral districts
