= Donald Laing =

Canadian politician

Donald Laing (May 24, 1883 – 1975) was a Scottish-born farmer and political figure in Saskatchewan. He represented Kerrobert from 1926 to 1929 and from 1934 to 1938 and Kerrobert-Kindersley from 1938 to 1944 in the Legislative Assembly of Saskatchewan as a Liberal.

He was born in Nairnshire, the son of Donald Laing and Ann Fraser, and was educated in Ardersier. Laing came to Canada in 1906. In 1913, he married Eleanor Brownell. He served as Reeve and was on the council for the rural municipality of Oakdale, also serving as reeve. Laing lived in Coleville, Saskatchewan. He was first elected to the provincial assembly in a 1926 by-election held after John Albert Dowd resigned his seat. He was defeated by Robert Hanbidge when he ran for reelection to the assembly in 1929; Laing defeated Hanbridge in the general election that followed in 1934. He was defeated by John Wellbelove when he ran for reelection in 1944.
