= Toronto Blue Jays Radio Network =

Professional baseball radio network

The Toronto Blue Jays Radio Network consists of 9 stations (8 AM, 1 FM) in 4 Canadian provinces broadcasting the team's games in English.

From 2018 to 2020, the radio team consisted of play-by-play announcers Ben Wagner and Mike Wilner. Wagner succeeded longtime radio announcer Jerry Howarth following the latter's retirement, while former radio analyst Joe Siddall moved to the television pregame show.

At the start of the 2021 season, the radio broadcasts consisted of a simulcast of the audio from the Sportsnet television broadcasts of Blue Jays games, featuring play-by-play announcer Dan Shulman and colour analysts Buck Martinez and Pat Tabler, with Rob Wong and Shoaib Ali serving as on-air hosts. The simulcasts continued through the end of July when the Blue Jays began playing home games at the Rogers Centre again after COVID-19 pandemic restrictions were eased, allowing the team to once again host home games in Toronto, with Ben Wagner returning to play-by-play. In 2023 it was announced that away games would be called remotely from Sportsnet's studio in downtown Toronto, a practice that has continued into the 2025 season.

On November 29, 2023, it was announced that Ben Wagner had been let go by Sportsnet in a move that Howarth called "embarrassing". On February 13, 2024, it was announced that Ben Shulman, the son of television play-by-play man Dan Shulman, would be taking over radio play-by-play with former MLB pitcher, Chris Leroux, joining Shulman as the colour commentator.

On July 7, 2026, Rogers Sports & Media announced the closure of six radio stations, four of which were members of the Toronto Blue Jays Radio Network.

== Stations ==
The current stations broadcasting Blue Jays games are as follows:

=== Alberta (1 station) ===
- 1440/CKJR: Edmonton Metropolitan Region (Saturday's and Sunday's only)

=== British Columbia (1 station) ===
- 610/CHNL: Kamloops

=== Ontario (6 stations) ===
- 600/CKAT: North Bay
- 1200/CFGO: Ottawa
- 1070/CHOK: Sarnia
- 107.1/CJCS-FM: Stratford
- 590/CJCL: Toronto (Flagship)
- 920/CKNX: Wingham

=== Saskatchewan (1 station) ===
- 1190/CFSL: Weyburn

== Former affiliates (24 stations) ==
- 960/CFAC: Calgary, Alberta (Sportsnet Radio Network)
- 101.7/CKER-FM Edmonton, Alberta
- 1150/CKFR: Kelowna, British Columbia
- 650/CISL: Vancouver, British Columbia (Sportsnet Radio Network)
- 1570/CKMW: Winkler, Manitoba
- 580/CKY: Winnipeg, Manitoba (1994–2003)
- 1290/CFRW: Winnipeg, Manitoba (2014-2020)
- 91.9/CKNI-FM: Moncton, New Brunswick (2006–2014)
- 88.9/CHNI-FM: Saint John, New Brunswick (2006–2014)
- 104.1/WWOL: Buffalo, New York (1977)
- 95.7/CJNI-FM: Halifax, Nova Scotia
- 820/CHAM: Hamilton, Ontario (2009–2010)
- 900/CHML: Hamilton, Ontario (2011)
- 960/CFFX: Kingston, Ontario
- 570/CKGL: Kitchener, Ontario
- 1310/CIWW: Ottawa, Ontario
- 90.5/CJMB-FM: Peterborough, Ontario
- 690/CKGM: Montreal, Quebec
- 730/CKAC: Montreal, Quebec (part-time affiliate, French only, 2007–2011)
  - simulcast on up to 10 relays
- 1150/CJSL: Estevan, Saskatchewan
- 1210/CFYM: Kindersley, Saskatchewan
- 980/CJME: Regina, Saskatchewan (2025 World Series only)
- 1330/CJYM: Rosetown, Saskatchewan
- 650/CKOM: Saskatoon, Saskatchewan (2025 World Series only)
