= Plenty, Saskatchewan =

Village in Saskatchewan, Canada

Plenty
- Village
- Village of Plenty
- Motto: Land of Plenty
- Location of Plenty in Saskatchewan Plenty (Canada)
- Coordinates: 51.801°N 108.838°W
- Country: Canada
- Province: Saskatchewan
- Region: Central
- Census division: 13
- Rural Municipality: Winslow No. 319
- Post office Founded: 1907

Government
  - Type: Municipal
  - Governing body: Plenty Village Council
  - Mayor: Dan Calder
  - Administrator: Michele Schmidt
  - MP: Rosemarie Falk
  - MLA: Ken Francis

Area
  - Land: 0.61 km^{2} (0.24 sq mi)

Population (2021)
  - Total: 128
  - Density: 209.8/km^{2} (543/sq mi)
- Time zone: UTC-6 (CST)
- Postal code: S0L 2R0
- Area code: 306
- Highways: Highway 31 Highway 657
- Railways: Canadian Pacific Railway

Plenty (2021 population: 128) is a village in the Canadian province of Saskatchewan within the Rural Municipality of Winslow No. 319 and Census Division No. 13. Plenty is located equidistant among Kindersley, Biggar, Kerrobert, and Rosetown and approximately 150 kilometres (93 mi) southwest of the city of Saskatoon.

== History ==
Plenty incorporated as a village on March 25, 1911.

The Canadian Pacific Railway (CPR) chose the name "Plenty". As the railroad was being laid, the future town site and surrounding areas were the first fields on the line that produced good crops, thus appearing to be "the Land of Plenty", and the town received its name from this inspiration.

Approximately 9.7 kilometres (6 mi) north of Plenty is the Moore's Ravine Municipal Heritage Site (Richard's Pasture) made up of approximately 200 acres (0.81 km^{2}) designated on which are located several Aboriginal heritage sites including two turtle effigies, the Plenty Medicine Wheel, and test pits where archaeological digs have revealed hundreds of scattered buffalo bones. This site is on private land.

East of Plenty by 6.4 kilometres (4 mi) is Opuntia Lake. It is a stopping place for birds and wildlife and covers approximately 1,395 hectares (3,450 acres). In the 1950s, the area surrounding the lake was made a game preserve to regulate hunting. Opuntia Lake is strategically situated in the major goose fall staging area of Western Canada, is a very important staging area for waterfowl. Estimated maximum fall concentrations include 15,000 to 20,000 geese (Canada, white-fronted, snow and Ross' geese), up to 30,000 ducks (mainly mallard, pintail, and assorted divers), 2,000 sandhill cranes, and 500 tundra swans. The lake supports only a small number of breeding and moulting dabblers and divers.

During the 1950s, a program of tree planting occurred at the lake along with the construction of baseball diamonds and a boat house. For several years the Plenty Sports Day was held at the lake. Several attempts were made to stock the lake with fish but the lakes salinity and fluctuating levels brought an end to this project and the use of the site for the sports day.

In the mid 1970s, a dirt and stock car track was built near the gravel pits at the lake. Although the track was completed, races were never held.

== Demographics ==
=== 2021 census ===
Population history (1981–2016)
Year	Pop.	±%
1981	175	—
1986	189	+8.0%
1991	170	−10.1%
1996	138	−18.8%
2001	147	+6.5%
2006	126	−14.3%
2011	131	+4.0%
2016	164	+25.2%
2021	128	−22.0%
Source: Statistics Canada via Saskatchewan Bureau of Statistics

In the 2021 Census of Population conducted by Statistics Canada, Plenty had a population of 128 living in 59 of its 75 total private dwellings, a change of −22% from its 2016 population of 164. With a land area of 0.61 km^{2} (0.24 sq mi), it had a population density of 209.8/km^{2} (543.5/sq mi) in 2021.

=== 2016 census ===
In the 2016 Census of Population, the Village of Plenty recorded a population of 164 living in 65 of its 79 total private dwellings, a 20.1% change from its 2011 population of 131. With a land area of 0.65 km^{2} (0.25 sq mi), it had a population density of 252.3/km^{2} (653.5/sq mi) in 2016.

== Economy ==
The economy of Plenty, Saskatchewan, is predominantly driven by agriculture, with additional contributions from oil and gas activities to the west and south of the town. This agricultural base is common throughout the region, which is part of Saskatchewan’s broader agricultural economy. Oil and gas exploration in the surrounding areas also play a supplementary role in supporting the local economy.

== Education ==
Plenty is located within the Sun West School Division. North West Central School, a Kindergarten to grade 12 school, services the surrounding communities of Kelfield, Ruthilda, and Stranraer and provides high school services for the community of Dodsland.

== Notable people ==
- Brad McCrimmon (1959–2011), former captain of the NHL's Calgary Flames and winner of the Stanley Cup with the Flames in 1989
- Kelly McCrimmon, former player, coach and General Manager of the Brandon Wheat Kings and General Manager of the Vegas Golden Knights
- Don Saxton who was part of Canada's National Volleyball team for eight years and competed for Canada at the 1983 World Student Games and the 1984 Olympic Games
- Jaycee Gebhard, Brynäs IF forward and first-ever draft pick of the NWHL's Toronto Six

== See also ==
- List of communities in Saskatchewan
- List of villages in Saskatchewan
