= Allan Neil McMillan =

Canadian politician

MLA for Kindersley
- In office 11 June 1975 – 18 October 1978
- Preceded by: Alex Taylor
- Succeeded by: Robert Lynal Andrew

Personal details
- Party: Saskatchewan Liberal Party

Allan Neil McMillan (born 1951) is a Canadian politician who was the MLA for Kindersley from 1975 to 1978.
