= Eldon Arthur Johnson =

Canadian politician

Eldon Arthur Johnson (October 18, 1919 – December 29, 2001) was a farmer, engineer and political figure in Saskatchewan. He represented Kerrobert-Kindersley from 1956 to 1964 in the Legislative Assembly of Saskatchewan as a Co-operative Commonwealth Federation (CCF) member.

He was born in Kindersley, Saskatchewan, the son of R.A. Johnson, and received a BEng from the University of Saskatchewan. Johnson served as a captain in the North Saskatchewan Regiment. In 1950, he married Charlotte Heinricks. Johnson was defeated by William S. Howes when he ran for reelection to the Saskatchewan assembly in 1964. During his time in the assembly, he helped develop provincial legislation to protect the province's archaeological heritage. After retirement, Johnson earned an MA in prehistoric lithic source studies. He served as president of the provincial archaeological society.
