= Jason Dearborn =

Canadian politician

Member of the Legislative Assembly of Saskatchewan for Kindersley
- In office October 4, 2002 – November 7, 2007
- Preceded by: Bill Boyd
- Succeeded by: Bill Boyd

Personal details
- Party: Saskatchewan Party
- Education: Trinity College, Toronto; University of Regina (MBA)

Jason Dearborn was a Saskatchewan Party MLA of the Saskatchewan Legislature.

== Early life ==
Attended St. Michaels University School in Victoria, B.C. Dearborn graduated from the University of Trinity College in the University of Toronto with a BA in 1994. He later returned to the same institution to graduate with an M.Div. in 1996. He earned a Masters of Business Administration from the University of Regina in 2007.

== Career ==
=== Saskatchewan Party MLA ===
He was elected in the riding of Kindersley in a by-election in 2002 and re-elected in the Saskatchewan General Election of 2003.

Prior to the 2007 general election, Dearborn announced he would not be seeking re-election. Bill Boyd, a founding member of the Saskatchewan Party and the constituency's previous MLA, was nominated by party members and won that election again for MLA in the constituency of Kindersley.

=== Private Sector ===
In 2007 Dearborn founded Brecknock Brewing Co. which produced beer for sale in Alberta and Saskatchewan . In 2010 Brecknock was rolled into a small public entity, with full shareholders approval.

Since that time Dearborn has been International Territory Manager with Brandt Agricultural and Chief Operating Officer with Maxcrop Farm Canada Inc.

In 2012 he was accepted for a diploma program in Global Strategic Strategy at the Said School of Business at Oxford University, UK.

On 10 December 2014, Dearborn, in his capacity as Chairman of the Dominion Bitcoin Mining Company, appeared before the Senate Standing Committee on Banking, Trade and Commerce for their Study on the use of digital currency.

=== Return to Politics ===
In 2016 Dearborn announced he would once again be running in Kindersley in the general election of that year. This time he would be running as an independent candidate against Saskatchewan Party incumbent Bill Boyd. Dearborn stated that his motivation for running was Boyd's involvement in a controversial land deal west of Regina at the provincial government's Global Transportation Hub.

== Incidents ==
Dearborn gained notoriety for an incident at a public meeting in February 2005. In jest, Dearborn "nominated" Lorne Calvert—at that time the Premier of Saskatchewan—to be shot for implementing a controversial plan for restructuring school divisions. Dearborn apologized for his remarks, and was stripped of his critic responsibilities for a period of time. Later he was returned to the Saskatchewan Party's shadow cabinet.

Legislative Assembly of Saskatchewan
Preceded by Bill Boyd	MLA Kindersley; 2002-2007	Succeeded by Bill Boyd
