= Edward Thomas Wordon Myers =

Canadian politician

Edward Thomas Wordon Myers (September 15, 1879 – March 14, 1962) was a physician and political figure in Saskatchewan, Canada. He represented Kindersley in the House of Commons of Canada from 1917 to 1921 as a Unionist Party member.

He was born in Portland, Ontario, the son of Thomas Myers and Lavana Farnham. Myers graduated from teacher's college and taught school for several years. He went on to study medicine at Queen's University, graduating in 1908. After graduating, Myers practiced medicine with his cousins who operated a clinic in Moncton, New Brunswick. In 1910, he travelled west, planning to set up practice in Saskatoon. He was persuaded instead to come to Rosetown. In 1913, he opened a private hospital there which closed the following year after the Rosetown Hospital was opened. Myers also owned a farm where he raised horses, some as racehorses. He was defeated by Archibald M. Carmichael when he ran for reelection to the House of Commons in 1921.

Myers retired from his practice in 1948, although he continued to see the occasional patient. He is said to have delivered over 4,000 babies during his career. In 1950, he was given a life membership by the Saskatchewan College of Physicians and Surgeons for his many years of service. He died in Rosetown at the age of 82.
