= George Harvey Watson =

Canadian politician

George Harvey Watson (1879–1947) was a farmer, merchant and political figure in Saskatchewan. He represented Kerrobert in the Legislative Assembly of Saskatchewan from 1912 to 1917 as a Liberal.

He came to Canada from England with his wife. Watson settled near Lashburn, Saskatchewan, where he operated a general store from 1906 until 1909, when he sold the store. He also worked a homestead in the area. Watson later moved to Luseland, where he owned a store; the store burnt around 1914. Watson died in Toronto.
