= Otto Buchanan Elliott =

Canadian politician

Member of Parliament for Kindersley
- In office 1935–1940
- Preceded by: Archibald M. Carmichael
- Succeeded by: Charles Albert Henderson

Personal details
- Born: September 26, 1886 Erin, Ontario
- Died: August 26, 1979 (aged 92) Darlington, Ontario
- Party: Social Credit Party of Canada,
- Profession: railway agent

Otto Buchanan Elliott (September 26, 1886 – August 26, 1979) was a railway station agent, and one of the founding representatives of the Social Credit Party of Canada, a political party in Canada that promoted the social credit theories of monetary reform.

Born in Erin, Ontario, Elliott was first elected to the House of Commons of Canada in the 1935 election as Member of Parliament representing Kindersley, Saskatchewan. He did not run for re-election in 1940 in order to allow the leader of the New Democracy party, William Herridge, to contest what was hoped to be a safe seat. The Social Credit movement had decided to support Herridge's new party. Herridge was unable to win the Kindersley seat in the 1940 federal election, however, coming in third place. Elliott is interred at Bowmanville Cemetery.
