= Addison Sod House =

Historic site in Saskatchewan, Canada

- Interactive map of Addison Sod House
- Type: Homestead
- Location: Oakdale No. 320, Kindersley, Saskatchewan, Canada
- Coordinates: 51°37′17″N 109°0′58″W
- Built: 1909–1911
- Architectural style: Sod house
- Governing body: Private Residence
- Website: Addison Sod House

National Historic Site of Canada
- Designated: National: 2005; Provincial: 1993

Addison Sod House is a Saskatchewan homestead site made of grass or sod which is over a hundred years old and has been designated as a National Historic Site of Canada.

== History of site ==
This sod home was used by James Addison and his family 10 miles (16 km) north of Kindersley, Saskatchewan, Canada and 6.5 miles (10.5 km) east on Highway 21. His property held a barn, two sheds, shelterbelt as well as dugout. Sod houses were a popular construction choice in the early 1900s by the early homesteaders to Saskatchewan and were similar to an earth sheltering type of house. Whereas many earth sheltering houses were built into hills, a 'soddie' had the base dug down about 3 feet (0.91 m) below the residence square footage area. A layer of buffalo, oxen or cattle chips which was then covered over with a well packed layer of clay. The walls were made of pieces of sod approximately 4 inches (100 mm) deep, 3 feet (0.91 m) wide, and 4 to 5 feet (1.5 m) long. These sod pieces were laid in overlapping fashion to construct all four walls. These walls would provide shelter in its enclosed space from precipitation, wind, heat, and the cold of 40 degree below winters, and insulation against the heat of 40 degree above summers. The roofs were generally made of aspen logs laid across the walls, and these logs covered in sod. Heavy spring rains were the main downfall of these homes as the sod on the roof, dried out from winter, and only supported with the logs would wash away with the water. Most homesteaders used the sod house as a temporary house until a wooden or brick structure was built.

This particular sod house had several unique features which has helped it to survive until this day, over a century after first construction. The sod chosen were from a dried up waterlogged area or a dried up slough so the grass roots were quite thick. Sods are usually overlapped when made into walls, however, Addison made a hole in the center of each sod piece so that as the piece of sod dried it would tend to crumble in on itself, rather than outwards. He also made each wall triangular, so that the width of the wall at the base was wider than the top. The roofs which were the downfall of most sod houses was not typical on Addison's sod house. He departed from using sod for the roof, but made a wooden hip roof with wood shingles eliminating water damage from spring rains, and winter snow melting. Addison also protected his sod walls from the elements, first by growing vines, then by covering the exterior with cedar shingles. With the advent new technologies in home construction, the cedar shingles were replaced with asphalt, then with vinyl siding.

James Addison and his descendants have continuously occupied the house since its construction. The family received an award for long term stewardship of a heritage property from Saskatchewan's lieutenant governor in 2017.

== Affiliations ==
The Museum is affiliated with: CMA, CHIN, and Virtual Museum of Canada.

== See also ==
- Earth sheltering
