= Robert Hanbidge =

Canadian politician

The Honourable Robert Hanbidge QC

12th Lieutenant Governor of Saskatchewan
- In office March 1, 1963 – February 2, 1970
- Monarch: Elizabeth II
- Governors General: Georges Vanier; Roland Michener
- Premier: Woodrow Lloyd; Ross Thatcher
- Preceded by: Frank Lindsay Bastedo
- Succeeded by: Stephen Worobetz

Member of the Canadian Parliament for Kindersley
- In office March 31, 1958 – March 1, 1963
- Preceded by: Merv Johnson
- Succeeded by: Reg Cantelon

Member of the Legislative Assembly of Saskatchewan for Kerrobert
- In office June 6, 1929 – June 19, 1934
- Preceded by: Donald Laing
- Succeeded by: Donald Laing

Personal details
- Born: Robert Leith Hanbidge; 16 March 1891 Southampton, Ontario, Canada
- Died: 25 July 1974 (aged 83)
- Party: Progressive Conservative
- Other political affiliations: Progressive Conservative Party of Saskatchewan
- Spouse(s): Jane Mitchell m. 8 September 1915

Robert Leith "Dinny" Hanbidge QC (16 March 1891 – 25 July 1974) was a Canadian lawyer, municipal, provincial and federal politician, and the 12th lieutenant governor of Saskatchewan, from 1963 to 1970.

== Early life ==
Born in Southampton, Ontario, the son of Robert and Fanny (Murton) Hanbidge, he graduated from the Owen Sound Collegiate and Vocational Institute in 1909 and moved to Regina, Saskatchewan where he took the Saskatchewan Law Society law course. He articled in the law firm of Sir Frederick Haultain, former Premier of the North-West Territories, and became a member of the Saskatchewan Law Society in 1915. He was appointed a King's Counsel in 1933. In 1915, he married Jane Mitchell. His son, Robert Donald Keith Hanbidge, a Flying Officer in the Royal Canadian Air Force, was killed during World War II.

From 1911 to 1913, he played football for the Regina Rugby Club (now the Saskatchewan Roughriders).

== Political career ==
In 1920, he was elected mayor of Kerrobert, Saskatchewan. In 1929, he was elected as the Conservative candidate to the Legislative Assembly of Saskatchewan and was the Chief Whip in Premier James Thomas Milton Anderson's co-operative government.

He first ran for the House of Commons of Canada as the Progressive Conservative candidate in the riding of Kindersley in the 1945 federal election. Although defeated, he was elected in the 1958 federal election and re-elected in the 1962 federal election. In 1963, he was appointed Lieutenant Governor of Saskatchewan and served until 1970.

In 1968, he was awarded an honorary Doctor of Laws from the University of Saskatchewan. He was Lieutenant-Governor of Saskatchewan from 1 March 1963 until 1 February 1970. The convention hall in the new Saskatchewan Centre of the Arts was originally named Hanbidge Hall but has subsequently been renamed twice. Hanbidge Crescent in Regina is also named in his honour.
