= Kerrobert (electoral district) =

Former provincial electoral district in Saskatchewan, Canada

Coordinates: 51°55′N 109°30′W

Kerrobert is a former provincial electoral district for the Legislative Assembly of the province of Saskatchewan, Canada. Located in west-central Saskatchewan, this constituency was created before the 3rd Saskatchewan general election in 1912. The district was dissolved and combined with the former Kindersley riding (as Kerrobert-Kindersley) before the 9th Saskatchewan general election in 1938.

It is now part of the present-day Kindersley constituency.

== Members of the Legislative Assembly ==
#	MLA	Served	Party
1.	George Harvey Watson	1912–1917	Liberal
2.	John Albert Dowd	1917–1926	Liberal
3.	Donald Laing	Nov. 9, 1926–1929	Liberal
4.	Robert Hanbidge	1929–1934	Conservative
5.	Donald Laing	1934–1938	Liberal

== Election results ==
1912 Saskatchewan general election: Kerrobert electoral district
Party	Candidate	Votes	%	±%
Liberal	George Harvey Watson	1,078	65.14%	–
Conservative	John Murton Hanbidge	577	34.86%	–
Total		1,655	100.00%	

1917 Saskatchewan general election: Kerrobert electoral district
Party	Candidate	Votes	%	±%
Liberal	John Albert Dowd	1,890	51.99%	-13.15
Conservative	Albert E. Mosses	1,745	48.01%	+13.15
Total		3,635	100.00%	

1921 Saskatchewan general election: Kerrobert electoral district
Party	Candidate	Votes	%	±%
Liberal	John Albert Dowd	2,468	65.92%	+13.93
Independent	James J. Cochrane	1,276	34.08%	–
Total		3,744	100.00%	

1925 Saskatchewan general election: Kerrobert electoral district
Party	Candidate	Votes	%	±%
Liberal	John Albert Dowd	2,121	62.44%	-3.48
Conservative	William James Milton McMullen	1,276	37.56%	-
Total		3,397	100.00%	

November 9, 1926 By-Election: Kerrobert electoral district
Party	Candidate	Votes	%	±%
Liberal	Donald Laing	2,311	56.37%	-6.07
Progressive	Harvey McGowan	1,789	43.63%	–
Total		4,100	100.00%	

1929 Saskatchewan general election: Kerrobert electoral district
Party	Candidate	Votes	%	±%
Conservative	Robert Hanbidge	3,117	57.33%	-
Liberal	Donald Laing	2,320	42.67%	-13.70
Total		5,437	100.00%	

1934 Saskatchewan general election: Kerrobert electoral district
Party	Candidate	Votes	%	±%
Liberal	Donald Laing	2,651	43.07%	+0.40
Conservative	Robert Hanbidge	1,788	29.05%	-28.28
Farmer-Labour	James Penberthy	1,716	27.88%	-
Total		6,155	100.00%	

== See also ==
- List of Saskatchewan provincial electoral districts
- List of Saskatchewan general elections
- Canadian provincial electoral districts
- Kerrobert, Saskatchewan
