= Charles Henderson (Canadian politician) =

Canadian politician

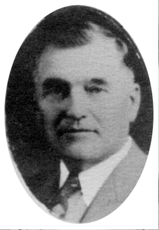

Member of Parliament for Kindersley
- In office March 1940 – June 1945
- Preceded by: Otto Buchanan Elliott
- Succeeded by: Frank Jaenicke

Personal details
- Born: Charles Albert Henderson; 14 January 1883 Pana, Illinois, United States
- Died: 11 December 1957 (aged 74) Dodsland, Saskatchewan, Canada
- Party: Liberal
- Spouse(s): Florence McKenzie m. 16 June 1920
- Profession: farmer

Charles Albert Henderson (14 January 1883 – 11 December 1957) was a Liberal party member of the House of Commons of Canada. He was born in Pana, Illinois, United States and became a farmer by career. In 1920 he married the local teacher, Florence Eustace Henderson (23 November, 1897 - 19 May 1987). Together they raised four children, Charles Frank, John McKenzie, Nina Jean and Elva Lorine.

Charles' parents were John Wesley Henderson and Susan Ida Osborn. They divorced and John Wesley took Charles and his brother Frank to Texas before moving to Newport, Nebraska. Charles attended school in Alvin, Texas and Newport Nebraska. He moved to Dodsland, Saskatchewan, Canada in 1910 and became a founder of the town.

He was first elected to Parliament at the Kindersley riding in the 1940 general election after unsuccessful campaigns there in 1930 and 1935. After one term in the House of Commons, he was defeated by Frank Jaenicke of the Co-operative Commonwealth Federation in the 1945 federal election. He died in 1957 and is buried in Dodsland.
