= Merv Johnson =

Canadian politician and farmer (1923–2019)

Willis Merwyn Johnson
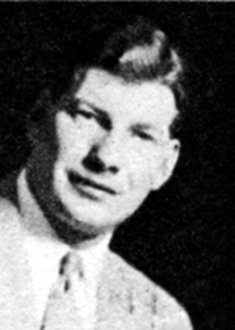

Member of Parliament for Kindersley
- In office August 1953 – August 1958
- Preceded by: Fred Larson
- Succeeded by: Robert Hanbidge

President of the New Democratic Party
- In office 1963–1965
- Preceded by: Michael Kelway Oliver
- Succeeded by: Eamon Park

Personal details
- Born: May 9, 1923 Kindersley, Saskatchewan, Canada
- Died: July 14, 2019 (aged 96) Victoria, British Columbia, Canada
- Party: Co-operative Commonwealth Federation
- Spouse(s): Elaine Aseltine m. Oct. 5, 1946
- Education: University of Saskatchewan
- Profession: farmer

Willis Merwyn Johnson (May 9, 1923 – July 14, 2019), better known as Merv Johnson, was a Canadian farmer and politician in Saskatchewan.

Johnson was the Co-operative Commonwealth Federation Member for Parliament for Kindersley, Saskatchewan. He first won his seat in the House of Commons of Canada in the 1953 federal election and was re-elected in 1957 before being defeated in the 1958 general election in the Diefenbaker landslide. He attempted to re-enter the House of Commons in several subsequent elections as a New Democrat but was unsuccessful.

In 1977, Johnson was appointed to serve as Saskatchewan's agent-general in London, England. He also served for several years as president of the Saskatchewan CCF-NDP and was president of the federal New Democratic Party of Canada from 1963 to 1965. He died in Victoria, British Columbia in July 2019 at the age of 96.
