= Frank Jaenicke =

Canadian politician (1892–1951)

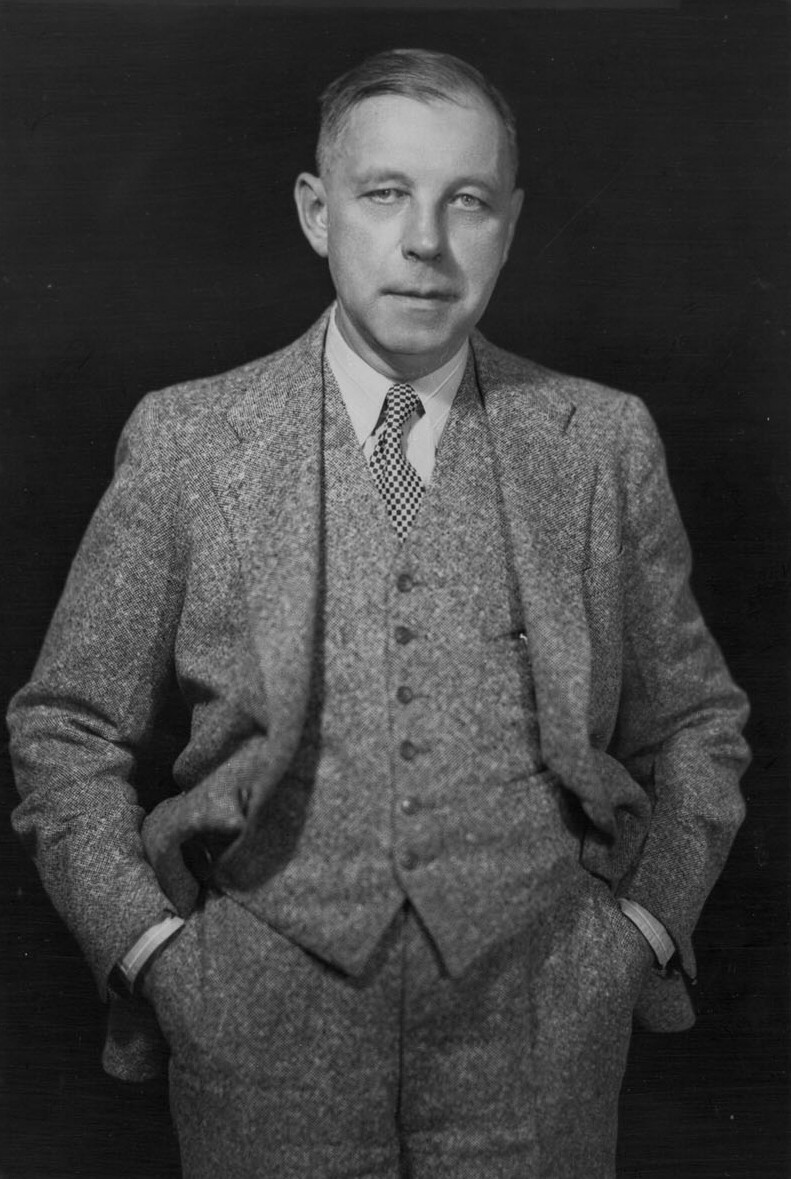
- Portrait, c. 1940s

Member of Parliament for Kindersley
- In office June 1945 – June 1949
- Preceded by: Charles Albert Henderson
- Succeeded by: Fred Larson

Personal details
- Born: Frank Eric Jaenicke; 23 August 1892 Germany
- Died: 2 February 1951 (aged 58) Luseland, Saskatchewan, Canada
- Party: Co-operative Commonwealth Federation
- Spouse(s): 1. deceased 2. Winnifred E. Evans; m. 3 August 1946
- Profession: barrister

Frank Eric Jaenicke (23 August 1892 – 2 February 1951) was a Co-operative Commonwealth Federation member of the House of Commons of Canada. He was born in Germany and became a barrister by career.

Jaenicke was an unsuccessful 1938 provincial election candidate for the Saskatchewan Co-operative Commonwealth Federation in the constituency of Kerrobert-Kindersley.

He was first elected to Parliament from the Kindersley riding in the 1945 general election. Jaenicke was defeated in the 1949 election by Fred Larson of the Liberal party.
