= Druid, Saskatchewan =

Hamlet in Saskatchewan, Canada

Coordinates: 51.799°N 108.805°W

Druid is a hamlet in Winslow Rural Municipality No. 319, Saskatchewan, Canada. The hamlet previously held the status of a village until December 31, 1953. It is adjacent to Dodsland along Highway 31.

== History ==
Prior to December 31, 1953, Druid was incorporated as a village, and was restructured as a hamlet under the jurisdiction of the Rural municipality of Winslow on that date.

== See also ==
- List of communities in Saskatchewan
- List of hamlets in Saskatchewan
