= Archibald M. Carmichael =

Canadian politician

Member of Parliament for Kindersley
- In office December 1921 – August 1935
- Preceded by: Edward Thomas Wordon Myers
- Succeeded by: Otto Buchanan Elliott

Personal details
- Born: 4 January 1882 Smithdale, Ontario, Canada
- Died: 30 August 1959 (aged 77)
- Party: Progressive
- Spouse(s): 1) Mary Magdalene Hahn m. 21 March 1906; 2) Roxena Anger m. 2 February 1916
- Profession: farmer, minister, teacher

Archibald M. Carmichael (4 January 1882 – 30 August 1959) was a Canadian farmer, minister, teacher and politician. Carmichael was a Progressive party member of the House of Commons of Canada. He was born in Smithdale, Ontario.

Carmichael attended Collingwood Collegiate Institute, the Bradford Model School and Regina Normal School. He was a schoolteacher for seven years, having received his teachers' certificate in Saskatchewan. From 1910 to 1922 he was secretary-treasurer for the rural municipality of Kindersley (#290) and chaired the area's school board for four years. He also served as secretary-treasurer of several rural phone companies.

He was first elected to Parliament at the Kindersley riding in the 1921 general election then re-elected there in 1925, 1926 and 1930. After completing his fourth term, the 17th Canadian Parliament, Carmichael left federal politics and did not seek re-election in the 1935 vote.
