= Beaufield =

Community in Saskatchewan, Canada

- Unincorporated community
- Location within Saskatchewan Location within Canada
- Coordinates: 51.450°N 109.060°W
- Country: Canada
- Province: Saskatchewan
- Region: Northwest Saskatchewan
- Census division: 13
- Rural Municipality: Oakdale No. 320
- Post Office Founded: May 1, 1908; 118 years ago

Government
  - Reeve: Darwin Whitfield
  - Administrator: Gillain Lund
  - Governing body: Oakdale No. 320
- Time zone: CST
- Postal code: S0L 0K0
- Area code: 306
- Highways: Highway 21
- Railways: Canadian National Railway

Beaufield, previously known as Ednaburg, is an unincorporated community in the Rural Municipality of Oakdale No. 320, Saskatchewan, Canada. Located at Section 18, Township 32, Range 22, West of the 3rd Meridian. It had its first post office named Ednaburg from 1908-05-01 to 1913-08-01 upon which date it changed name to Beaufield. Ednaburg was located at Section 16, Township 32, Range 22, West of the 3rd Meridian. about 2 kilometres (1.2 mi) east of Highway 21.

== See also ==
- List of communities in Saskatchewan
