= CFYM =

Radio station in Saskatchewan, Canada

Coordinates: 51°27′05″N 109°08′44″W

- Kindersley, Saskatchewan; Canada
- Broadcast area: West Central Saskatchewan
- Frequency: 1210 kHz (AM)
- Branding: CFYM 1210

Programming
- Format: Classic hits

Ownership
- Owner: Golden West Broadcasting
- Sister stations: CJYM, CKVX-FM

History
- First air date: 1986

Technical information
- Class: C
- Power: 1,000 watts daytime 250 watts nighttime

Links
- Webcast: Listen Live
- Website: westcentralonline.com/cfym

CFYM is a Canadian radio station broadcasting a classic hits format at 1210 AM. Licensed to Kindersley, Saskatchewan, it serves west central Saskatchewan. It first began broadcasting in 1986 after receiving approval by the CRTC. It is a repeater for CJYM in Rosetown. CFYM broadcasts with a power of 1,000 watts daytime, 250 watts nighttime.

The station is currently owned by Golden West Broadcasting.

== See also ==
- CJYM
