= Fred Larson (politician) =

Canadian politician (1913–1994)

Member of Parliament for Kindersley
- In office June 1949 – August 1953
- Preceded by: Frank Eric Jaenicke
- Succeeded by: Merv Johnson

Personal details
- Born: Frederick Hugo Larson; 24 November 1913 Lang, Saskatchewan, Canada
- Died: 21 February 1994 (aged 80) Edmonton, Alberta, Canada
- Party: Liberal
- Spouse(s): Dorothy Layng m. 5 March 1941
- Relations: Bernard Larson (grandfather)
- Profession: farmer

Frederick Hugo Larson (24 November 1913 – 21 February 1994) was a Liberal party member of the House of Commons of Canada. He was born in Lang, Saskatchewan, studied at the University of Saskatchewan, and became a farmer by career.

He was first elected to Parliament for the Kindersley riding in the 1949 general election. After serving his only term in the House of Commons, Larson was defeated by Merv Johnson of the Co-operative Commonwealth Federation in the 1953 federal election.

Larson also attempted to win a seat in the Legislative Assembly of Saskatchewan for the provincial Liberal party in 1948 in the Kerrobert-Kindersley riding, but was unsuccessful. He died in Edmonton on 21 February 1994.
