= Bill Boyd (Canadian politician) =

Canadian politician

The Honourable Bill Boyd ECS

Leader of the Opposition (Saskatchewan)
- In office 1994–1995
- Preceded by: Rick Swenson
- Succeeded by: Lynda Haverstock

Member of the Saskatchewan Legislative Assembly for Kindersley
- In office November 7, 2007 – September 1, 2017
- Preceded by: Jason Dearborn
- Succeeded by: Ken Francis
- In office October 21, 1991 – April 4, 2002
- Preceded by: Bob Andrew
- Succeeded by: Jason Dearborn

Personal details
- Born: August 22, 1956 (age 69) Eston, Saskatchewan
- Party: Non-affiliated (2017); Saskatchewan Party (1997-2017)
- Other political affiliations: Progressive Conservative (1991-1997)
- Spouse: Lynn
- Children: 2
- Occupation: Farmer

Bill Boyd (born August 22, 1956) is a former provincial politician from Saskatchewan, Canada. He served as a member of the Saskatchewan Legislature from 1991 to 2002 and returned to office in the 2007 Saskatchewan general election, serving until his resignation in 2017.

Boyd was first elected as the member representing the Kindersley electoral district in the 1991 Saskatchewan general election. He defeated two other candidates in a hotly contested race to win his district. Boyd became leader of the Progressive Conservative Party of Saskatchewan on November 21, 1994. He led the party into the 1995 Saskatchewan general election. The party only won five seats after major scandals from the Progressive Conservative government of Grant Devine had come to light. Boyd was personally re-elected in his district by a wide margin.

Boyd left the Progressive Conservative party in 1997 to help form the Saskatchewan Party. He was re-elected to his third term in the 1999 Saskatchewan general election winning his largest plurality to date. He stepped down in 2002.

Boyd returned to the Saskatchewan Legislature in the 2007 Saskatchewan general election. On November 21, 2007, he was appointed Minister of Energy and Resources and Minister Responsible for Intergovernmental Affairs under Premier Brad Wall as well as Minister of the Economy. He served in this position until he resigned from cabinet in August 2016.

Boyd announced on August 15, 2017, that he would be retiring from the legislature effective September 1. He was expelled from the Saskatchewan Party caucus on August 28 after being found in conflict of interest over his promotion in China of an immigration scheme in which Boyd encouraged would-be immigrants to invest $300,000 in an irrigation project his company owned in order to qualify as immigrants to Canada. The scheme was operated under the Saskatchewan Immigrant Nominee Program, which Boyd has overseen as Minister of the Economy.

Boyd was found to be using his connections to the Saskatchewan government for personal benefit by the province's conflict of interest commissioner. He was involved in a government land sale scheme that benefited many of his political donors and business associates.

In February 2018, Boyd pled guilty to two charges of violating wildlife habitat protection and environmental management laws. In April 2018, Boyd was fined $35,000. $7,000 of the fine stemmed from a 2017 incident in which Boyd illegally cultivated approximately six acres of protected grasslands by the South Saskatchewan River. The area was owned by a corporation in which Boyd's son had shares, though Boyd directed the proposed irrigation project. Boyd claimed his illegal cultivation was a result of surveying errors made by depending on his tractor's GPS and a handheld surveying device. The remaining $28,000 of the fine was for building irrigation infrastructure in the river without obtaining the proper permits, which would not have been granted if applied for.
