= Ken Francis =

Canadian politician

Member of the Saskatchewan Legislative Assembly for Kindersley
- In office March 1, 2018 – October 1, 2024
- Preceded by: Bill Boyd
- Succeeded by: Kim Gartner

Personal details
- Party: Saskatchewan Party

Ken Francis is a Canadian politician, who serves as the mayor of Kindersley, Saskatchewan.

He was first elected to the Legislative Assembly of Saskatchewan in a by-election on March 1, 2018. He retired as an MLA in 2024. He represented the electoral district of Kindersley as a member of the Saskatchewan Party.

Francis was re-elected to a full term in the 2020 general election. On May 29, 2023, he announced he will not seek re-election in the next election, but remained as an MLA until the election in October 2024.

In November 2024, he was elected as the mayor of Kindersley.
