= William S. Howes =

Canadian politician

William S. Howes (June 25, 1926 – July 12, 2000 ) was a farmer, municipal secretary and political figure in Saskatchewan. He represented Kerrobert-Kindersley from 1964 to 1971 in the Legislative Assembly of Saskatchewan as a Liberal.

He was born in Kindersley, Saskatchewan, the son of William H. Howes and Hazel May Skinkle, and was educated there. In 1947, he married Carrie Lou Carrie Lou Naffziger. Howes served as deputy speaker in the Saskatchewan assembly. He was defeated by Alex Taylor when he ran for reelection to the assembly in 1971.
