= Coleville School District No. 3645 =

School district in Saskatchewan, Canada

Coleville School District No. 3645 was created to educate students in the area of Coleville, Saskatchewan. The school district operated from 1913 to March 6, 1946, when it became a part of the consolidated Kindersley School Unit.

== History ==
=== Coleville School District ===
Beginning in the fall of 1913, and continuing over the course of the next two years, the citizens of Coleville and the surrounding area met to organize the formation of a school district. While there was some opposition, on September 2, 1915, the Coleville School District No. 3645 was officially formed.

The school opened on October 13, 1915. Classes were held in Dumouchel's Hall until a dedicated school building could be completed. The first board of trustees, H.L. Dumouchel, Richard Chynoweth, Charlie Farris, and A. G. Bridger were authorized to borrow $1,600 towards the building and equipping of a new school. The debenture was to be repaid in ten consecutive annual installments, with interest not exceeding eight percent, was used to build a single-room wooden schoolhouse. While the lower grades were moved into the new schoolhouse, high school classes continued to be held in Dumouchel's Hall. On June 6, 1921, the school district was authorized to borrow $13,000 for the construction of a two-room brick schoolhouse, which was constructed shortly thereafter, and all grades moved into the new building.

The Great Depression of the 1930s caused significant hardships for the school district and the teachers. In 1931, salaries were lowered across the board. The principal's salary was reduced from $1,600 per year to $1,200 per year, and a teacher's salary was reduced from $1,000 per year to $900 per year. In 1933, wages were further reduced when the school district decided to only pay half-wages, while the other half was given in the form of a promissory note to be redeemed by the district "when times returned to normal". In 1938 teachers received no compensation at all for a portion of that year. Over the summer of 1937, the school district had more than 90 applications to fill a single position with a (nominal) wage of $600 a year. At the same time, the school district applied to the government for an interim grant in order to cover operating costs for the next school year, which was not filled when the school year started. While they waited for the government to pay the grant, teachers for the district continued to teach without receiving a wage. During this time, the teachers received a relief allowance of $11/month from the government. This was not enough to live on, and relief vouchers were not accepted by the CNR, leaving the teachers with limited means of getting to the nearest medical facility should they fall ill. In May 1938, the government cut off even this meagre allowance, stating that it was no longer necessary because provisions were being made by the government for paying of the interim grants. However, until the grants were actually paid, the school board could not provide the teachers with a salary, leaving them completely without income.

Tuition was initially charged to students entering grade 12. The tuition rate varied annually with the number of students taking grade 12, and the ability of families to pay the fee. In 1940, due to declining enrollment in grade 12, tuition for grade 12 was dropped in order to encourage students to complete their education.

The Warwick School was closed in July 1940, and students from that district were admitted into the Coleville district for a fee of $25 per family. In September of that year the principal of the Coleville school was drafted, leaving them without a principal for three months.

Consolidation with Kindersley School Unit No. 34 was discussed as early as 1939, as a means of reducing costs and improving educational opportunities. In February 1945, an application was made for the merger to occur. As a precondition, guarantees were sought for the high school to remain in Coleville after the consolidation, and on March 6, 1946 the Coleville School District became part of the Kindersley School Unit.

=== Kindersley School Unit ===
Almost immediately, the Kindersley School Unit began to centralize the many smaller school districts. A "van system" was introduced, whereby local people used their own vehicles to transport students to central schools, with the costs borne by the unit. Later dedicated vans were used for this service, and in 1953 the vans were replaced by a bus.

The St. Florence School was closed in 1948, and students were "vanned" to the Coleville school. This was followed by Eureka in 1949. Driver School closed in 1959, and from 1963 until 1970 some of the districts primary grade students were routed to Coleville. In 1972 parts of the Driver and Buffalo Coulee school districts were added to the Coleville bus route, which now included all rural students in St. Florence, Eureka, Colville (rural), south Warwick, east Driver, and parts of Buffalo Coulee.

Rossville School was built in 1957, to accommodate the influx of people to the Coleville area after the discovery of oil in 1951. Soon after Rossville School was built, Coleville lost its high school, as upper grades were bussed to Kindersley: in 1957, grades 11 & 12; in 1959, grade 10; in 1960, grade 9; and in 1966 grades 7 and 8. In 1972 grade 7 was returned to Coleville.

== Schools ==
=== Dumouchel's Hall ===
From October 13, 1915, until the construction of the brick school house in 1922, Dumouchel's Hall was used as a temporary school. Lower grades were moved out on completion of the wooden school house in 1916, however upper grades continued to hold classes in the hall.

=== The "Wooden" school ===
The single-room wooden schoolhouse was the first dedicated school building in the Colevile School District. It was built for a cost of $1,600, and was completed in 1916. The structure was built by Les Cole and Fred Wood. It was later connected to the "Brick" schoolhouse. After the brick schoolhouse was demolished, it was sold and moved out of town. In 1981 it was located on the farm of Alex Schmidt.

=== The "Brick" school ===
Construction of the two-room Brick schoolhouse began in 1921, after a loan of $13,000 was secured for the project. The building was completed in 1922, however the mortar work needed to be redone shortly after. On the main floor the building contained two classrooms, one for grades 1 through 6, and one for grades 7 through 12. In the basement were separate boys and girls playrooms, and indoor chemical toilets. In 1925 a well was dug in front of the school, and the schoolyard was treed.

In 1927 a third room added by connecting the new school to the original wooden school. Originally intermediate students were taught in the attached schoolhouse, but due to tight quarters this was changed in 1934, and elementary students were moved to this room.

As a result of fundraisers held in 1938, a piano was purchased for the school. The piano was located in the wooden schoolhouse, and lessons were given after school.

In March 1946, a fire of unknown origin broke out in the cloakroom of the brick schoolhouse. The fire was quickly extinguished, and the damage was repaired for $30.

The school was electrified in the early 1950s, along with the rest of the town. Water and sewer services did not come to the school until 1964. In response to the population boom after the discovery of oil in the area in 1951, the basement was remodeled and made into a classroom. The brick school continued to operate concurrently with Rossville School, built in 1957, until it was closed and demolished in 1973

Facilities in the brick school were limited compared with modern schools. The laboratory was a white table with black shelves located at the back of the classroom. Among the options for upper grades were classes in Agriculture, Latin, French and Chemistry. School plays were a regular part of school.

=== Rossville School ===
Rossville School was built in 1957, and was named after Ross Ferris, janitor for the school division for 37 years. Rossville contained 5 classrooms. Water and sewer service was extended to the school in 1964. The school was enlarged and renovated in 1986?

== Kindergarten ==
Kindergarten was introduced to the Coleville area in 1960. For a tuition cost of $4 per month, kindergarten classes were held for 100 half-days (9:00AM to 11:30AM). Kindergarten was established and initially taught by Vivian Close, and classes were held in a small storage room in the basement of the brick school. The Coleville kindergarten became part of a provincial feasibility study regarding mandating kindergarten in all schools. Kindergarten eventually did become part of the school system, with classes occurring all day, every second day.
