= CJYM =

Radio station in Rosetown, Saskatchewan

Coordinates: 51°27′31″N 107°59′40″W

- Rosetown, Saskatchewan; Canada
- Broadcast area: West Central Saskatchewan
- Frequency: 1330 kHz (AM)
- Branding: CJYM 1330

Programming
- Format: Classic hits

Ownership
- Owner: Golden West Broadcasting
- Sister stations: CFYM, CKVX-FM

History
- First air date: 1966

Technical information
- Class: B
- Power: 10,000 watts
- Repeater: CFYM 1210 Kindersley

Links
- Webcast: Listen Live
- Website: westcentralonline.com/cjym

CJYM (1330 AM) is a radio station broadcasting a classic hits format. Licensed to Rosetown, Saskatchewan, Canada, it serves west central Saskatchewan.

== History ==
It first began broadcasting in 1966 under the call letters CKKR. CJYM is a Class B AM station which broadcasts with a power of 10,000 watts daytime and nighttime. CJYM is the only full-power station in Canada which broadcasts on 1330 kHz.

The station celebrated its 40th anniversary in 2006 with a large party at the Rosetown park. The station is currently owned by Golden West Broadcasting.

== See also ==
- CFYM
