= Algoma School District No. 2876 =

Former schoolhouse in Saskatchewan, Canada

The Algoma School District was a 'single room schoolhouse' school district located in Saskatchewan, Canada in the Rural Municipality of Oakdale. The school was built on SE 3-33-22-W3. The name Algoma was submitted to the Saskatchewan Department of Education by the Write brothers, after the district in Ontario from which they had migrated. The school was built in 1914, and closed in June, 1946. Since it was one of the earliest schools completed in the area, students from other districts also attended. The school was enlarged in 1925, during which a basement was dug, and a furnace installed. The school site was also treed at this time. After the school was closed in 1946, it was sold to Bert Van Basten and used as a granary.

The first trustees of the district were Arthur Hamwood, James Wright, and Chester Lyster, who also acted as secretary-treasurer. The first inspector was A. W Keith.

The students from the school competed in softball, tennis, basketball, and music. The school entered in Saskatchewan music festivals on three occasions, with the students winning diplomas.

== Teachers ==
The following is a chronological list of teachers that taught at the Algoma school:

- Mr. McKnight
- Mr. Cambell
- Miss Prouse
- Mrs. Kurtin
- Miss Wilfort
- Mrs. Archie Elliot
- Miss Myrtle Foster
- Miss Phylis Webb
- Mrs. W. C. Sutherland
- Mr. Louis Jones
- Mr. Stanley Scott
- Miss Carmel Seay
- Mr. Robert Evans
- Miss Stack
- Miss Grace McKay
- Miss Joyce Bird
- Mrs. Lebedoff
- Miss Dorothy Weir
- Miss Majorie Jenn
- Miss June Campbell
- Miss Margery Mack
- Miss Jean Smith
