= Rural Municipality of Winslow No. 319 =

Rural municipality in Saskatchewan, Canada

Winslow No. 319
- Rural municipality
- Rural Municipality of Winslow No. 319
- Location of the RM of Winslow No. 319 in Saskatchewan
- Coordinates: 51.745°N 108.772°W
- Country: Canada
- Province: Saskatchewan
- Census division: 13
- SARM division: 6
- Formed: December 13, 1909

Government
  - Reeve: Sheldon McLean
  - Governing body: RM of Winslow No. 319 Council
  - Administrator: Regan MacDonald
  - Office location: Dodsland

Area (2016)
  - Land: 798.07 km^{2} (308.14 sq mi)

Population (2016)
  - Total: 344
  - Density: 0.4/km^{2} (1.0/sq mi)
- Time zone: CST
  - Summer (DST): CST
- Area codes: 306 and 639

The Rural Municipality of Winslow No. 319 (2016 population: 344) is a rural municipality (RM) in the Canadian province of Saskatchewan within Census Division No. 13 and SARM Division No. 6.

== History ==
The RM of Winslow No. 319 incorporated as a rural municipality on December 13, 1909.

== Geography ==
=== Communities and localities ===
The following urban municipalities are surrounded by the RM.

Villages

- Dodsland
- Plenty

The following unincorporated communities are within the RM.

Localities

- Ava
- Druid (dissolved as a village, December 31, 1953)
- Millerdale
- Wallisville
- Whitepool

== Demographics ==
Population history (1981–2016)
Year	Pop.	±%
1981	564	—
1986	533	−5.5%
1991	447	−16.1%
1996	390	−12.8%
2001	343	−12.1%
2006	296	−13.7%
2011	324	+9.5%
2016	344	+6.2%
Source: Statistics Canada via Saskatchewan Bureau of Statistics

In the 2021 Census of Population conducted by Statistics Canada, the RM of Winslow No. 319 had a population of 344 living in 118 of its 140 total private dwellings, a change of 0% from its 2016 population of 344. With a land area of 814.35 km^{2} (314.42 sq mi), it had a population density of 0.4/km^{2} (1.1/sq mi) in 2021.

In the 2016 Census of Population, the RM of Winslow No. 319 recorded a population of 344 living in 127 of its 137 total private dwellings, a 6.2% change from its 2011 population of 324. With a land area of 798.07 km^{2} (308.14 sq mi), it had a population density of 0.4/km^{2} (1.1/sq mi) in 2016.

== Government ==
The RM of Winslow No. 319 is governed by an elected municipal council and an appointed administrator that meets on the second Wednesday of every month. The reeve of the RM is Sheldon McLean while its administrator is Regan MacDonald. The RM's office is located in Dodsland.

== Transportation ==
- Highway 31—serves Dodsland, Saskatchewan and Plenty, Saskatchewan
- Highway 658—serves Dodsland, Saskatchewan

== See also ==
- List of rural municipalities in Saskatchewan
- List of communities in Saskatchewan
