= Kindersley (federal electoral district) =

Former Canadian electoral district

Kindersley was a federal electoral district in Saskatchewan, Canada, that was represented in the House of Commons of Canada from 1917 to 1968. It was created in 1914 from Battleford, Moose Jaw and Saskatoon ridings. It was abolished in 1966 when it was redistributed into Battleford—Kindersley and Swift Current—Maple Creek ridings.

== Members of Parliament ==
This riding elected the following members of Parliament:

1. Edward Thomas Wordon Myers, Unionist (1917–1921)
2. Archibald M. Carmichael, Progressive (1921–1935)
3. Otto Buchanan Elliott, Social Credit (1935–1940)
4. Charles Albert Henderson, Liberal (1940–1945)
5. Frank Eric Jaenicke, Co-operative Commonwealth Federation (1945–1949)
6. Fred Larson, Liberal (1949–1953)
7. Merv Johnson, C.C.F. (1953–1958)
8. Robert Hanbidge, Progressive Conservative (1958–1963)
9. Reg Cantelon, Progressive Conservative (1963–1968)

== Election results ==
1917 Canadian federal election
Party	Candidate	Votes
Government (Unionist)	Edward Thomas Wordon Myers	8,310
Opposition (Laurier Liberals)	James Thrasher Seward	2,750

1921 Canadian federal election
Party	Candidate	Votes
Progressive	Archibald M. Carmichael	13,911
Conservative	Edward Thomas Wordon Myers	2,995

1925 Canadian federal election
Party	Candidate	Votes
Progressive	Archibald M. Carmichael	3,631
Liberal	William Charles Sutherland	2,614
Conservative	James Lewis Acheson	1,218

1926 Canadian federal election
Party	Candidate	Votes
Progressive	Archibald M. Carmichael	5,540
Liberal	John Albert Dowd	5,326

1930 Canadian federal election
Party	Candidate	Votes
Progressive	Archibald M. Carmichael	7,350
Liberal	Charles Albert Henderson	5,170

1935 Canadian federal election
Party	Candidate	Votes
Social Credit	Otto Buchanan Elliott	6,856
Liberal	Charles Albert Henderson	4,777
Co-operative Commonwealth	Leslie Charles Sherman	2,189

1940 Canadian federal election
Party	Candidate	Votes
Liberal	Charles Albert Henderson	5,068
Co-operative Commonwealth	Arthur Hill Gilmour Mitchell	3,966
New Democracy	William Duncan Herridge	3,922

1945 Canadian federal election
Party	Candidate	Votes
Co-operative Commonwealth	Frank Eric Jaenicke	5,499
Liberal	Charles Albert Henderson	4,787
Progressive Conservative	Robert Leith Hanbidge	2,653
Social Credit	Pearl Johnston	1,001

1949 Canadian federal election
Party	Candidate	Votes
Liberal	Fred Larson	7,872
Co-operative Commonwealth	Frank Eric Jaenicke	6,567
Progressive Conservative	Wilfred Joseph Burton	2,247

1953 Canadian federal election
Party	Candidate	Votes
Co-operative Commonwealth	Merv Johnson	8,672
Liberal	Fred Larson	8,531
Social Credit	William Ronald Leeson	2,168
Progressive Conservative	Arthur Sprague Miller	1,096

1957 Canadian federal election
Party	Candidate	Votes
Co-operative Commonwealth	Merv Johnson	8,605
Liberal	Anthony C. Steiert	7,336
Progressive Conservative	R.W. Cantelon	3,777
Social Credit	W.R. Leeson	2,767

1958 Canadian federal election
Party	Candidate	Votes
Progressive Conservative	Robert Hanbidge	8,935
Co-operative Commonwealth	Merv Johnson	7,027
Liberal	Anthony C. Steiert	5,362

1962 Canadian federal election
Party	Candidate	Votes
Progressive Conservative	Robert Hanbidge	9,170
Liberal	Anthony C. Steiert	6,170
New Democratic	Merv Johnson	5,088

1963 Canadian federal election
Party	Candidate	Votes
Progressive Conservative	Reg Cantelon	9,944
Liberal	J.B. Joe Martin	5,957
New Democratic	Merv Johnson	4,461
Social Credit	Ron Leeson	1,335

1965 Canadian federal election
Party	Candidate	Votes
Progressive Conservative	Reg Cantelon	9,223
Liberal	Joseph B. Martin	5,650
New Democratic	Merv Johnson	5,640

== See also ==
- List of Canadian electoral districts
- Historical federal electoral districts of Canada
