= Kim Gartner =

Canadian politician

The Honourable Kim Gartner ECS MLA

Member of the Saskatchewan Legislative Assembly for Kindersley-Biggar
- Incumbent
- Assumed office October 1, 2024
- Preceded by: Ken Francis

Personal details
- Party: Saskatchewan Party

Kim Gartner is a Canadian politician who was elected to the Legislative Assembly of Saskatchewan in the 2024 general election, representing Kindersley-Biggar as a member of the Saskatchewan Party.

Prior to his election, he served as a school trustee with the Living Sky School Division. He was born near Macklin, Saskatchewan, Canada.

== Political career ==
On December 11, 2025, Gartner was named Saskatchewan’s Minister of Highways.
