= Robert Lynal Andrew =

Canadian lawyer and politician (born 1944)

Robert Lynal Andrew (born April 13, 1944) is a lawyer and former political figure in Saskatchewan, Canada. He represented Kindersley from 1978 to 1989 as a Progressive Conservative.

Robert Andrew was born in Eston, Saskatchewan, the son of Robert Elvin Andrew and Elizabeth Ann Ellis, and was educated in Eston and at the University of Saskatchewan, where he received a B.A. in political science and a law degree. From 1967 to 1970, Andrew was employed in the oil and potash industries; he then practised law in Kindersley. He was admitted to the Saskatchewan bar in 1971. Andrew served on the town council for Eston from 1972 to 1974. In 1974, he married Norma Lynne Tunall.

Andrew worked on Robert Stanfield's campaign in 1968 and also worked on the campaigns for local federal Progressive Conservative candidates in 1972 and 1974. He served in the Saskatchewan cabinet as Minister of Finance, as Minister of Economic Development and Trade, as Minister of Justice and Attorney General and as Minister of Trade and Investment. Andrew resigned from cabinet in October 1989 and from the assembly in December 1989 when he was named agent general in Minneapolis, Minnesota. He left this post in 1991 when the provincial New Democratic Party closed Saskatchewan's trade offices. Andrew was then named to the National Energy Board and moved to Calgary. He was fired from the board in May 1997.

Andrew was ordered to repay $4,225 in the aftermath of the Saskatchewan Progressive Conservative expense fraud scandal.
