= Alex Taylor (Canadian politician) =

Canadian politician

MLA for Kerrobert–Kindersley
- In office 1971–1975
- Preceded by: William S. Howes

Personal details
- Born: 24 January 1936 (age 90) Glasgow, Scotland
- Party: Saskatchewan New Democratic Party
- Occupation: clergyman

Alex Taylor (born 24 January 1936) was a Canadian politician. He served in the Legislative Assembly of Saskatchewan from 1971 to 1975, as a NDP member for the constituency of Kerrobert–Kindersley. He is a clergyman, born in Glasgow, Scotland.
