= John Albert Dowd =

Canadian politician

- Born: July 19, 1879
- Died: May 10, 1932 (aged 52)
- Spouse: E.A. Millar (1904)
- Father: Benjamin Dowd

John Albert Dowd (July 19, 1879 – May 10, 1932) was a farmer and political figure in Saskatchewan. He represented Kerrobert in the Legislative Assembly of Saskatchewan from 1917 to 1926 as a Liberal.

He was the son of Benjamin Dowd and was educated in South Durham, Ontario. In 1904, he married E.A. Millar. Dowd lived in Millerdale, Saskatchewan.
