= Reg Cantelon =

Canadian politician

Reginald (Reg) Cantelon
- Official 1966 portrait

Member of Parliament for Kindersley
- In office April 1963 – June 1968

Personal details
- Born: 24 September 1902 Indian Head, Northwest Territories
- Died: 2 September 1993 (aged 90) Unity, Saskatchewan
- Party: Progressive Conservative
- Spouse(s): Elma Vivienne Baldwin m. 13 Aug 1929
- Profession: school principal, teacher

Reginald W. Cantelon (24 September 1902 – 2 September 1993) was a Progressive Conservative Party member of the House of Commons of Canada. He was born in Indian Head, Northwest Territories and became a school principal and teacher by career.

He was first elected at the Kindersley riding in the 1963 general election after an unsuccessful attempt to win the riding in the 1957 election. Cantelon was re-elected in the 1965, but defeated by Rod Thomson of the New Democratic Party in the 1968 election, when Cantelon's riding was changed to Battleford—Kindersley.
