= John Wellbelove =

Canadian politician

John Wellbelove (September 13. 1878 – November 26, 1973) was an English-born farmer and political figure in Saskatchewan. He represented Kerrobert-Kindersley from 1944 to 1956 in the Legislative Assembly of Saskatchewan as a Co-operative Commonwealth Federation (CCF) member.

He was born in Berkshire, was educated at Sunningdale School and came to Canada in 1907. Wellbelove came west in 1909 and settled on a homestead near the future site of Eston, Saskatchewan. He served on the executive of the United Farmers of Canada, was a Saskatchewan Wheat Pool delegate and served on the Western Grain Standards Committee from 1927 to 1944. He also was a member of the council for the rural municipality of Snipe Lake and a member of the Eston school board; Wellbelove also served on the Board of Stewards for the Methodist Church and then for the United Church of Canada. He was deputy speaker for the provincial assembly from 1946 to 1956.
