= Rural Municipality of Oakdale No. 320 =

Rural municipality in Saskatchewan, Canada

Oakdale No. 320
- Rural municipality
- Rural Municipality of Oakdale No. 320
- Location of the RM of Oakdale No. 320 in Saskatchewan
- Coordinates: 51.707°N 109.182°W
- Country: Canada
- Province: Saskatchewan
- Census division: 13
- SARM division: 6
- Formed: December 13, 1909

Government
  - Reeve: Darwin Whitfield
  - Governing body: RM of Oakdale No. 320 Council
  - Administrator: Gillain Lund
  - Office location: Coleville

Area (2016)
  - Land: 805.92 km^{2} (311.17 sq mi)

Population (2016)
  - Total: 253
  - Density: 0.3/km^{2} (0.78/sq mi)
- Time zone: CST
  - Summer (DST): CST
- Area codes: 306 and 639

The Rural Municipality of Oakdale No. 320 (2016 population: 253) is a rural municipality (RM) in the Canadian province of Saskatchewan within Census Division No. 13 and SARM Division No. 6. Located in the west-central portion of the province, it is near the Alberta boundary.

== History ==
The RM of Oakdale No. 320 incorporated as a rural municipality on December 13, 1909.

== Geography ==
=== Communities and localities ===
The following urban municipalities are surrounded by the RM.

Villages

- Coleville

The following unincorporated communities are within the RM.

Localities

- Beaufield (Ednaburg)
- Driver

== Demographics ==
Population history (1981–2016)
Year	Pop.	±%
1981	446	—
1986	436	−2.2%
1991	388	−11.0%
1996	354	−8.8%
2001	332	−6.2%
2006	290	−12.7%
2011	258	−11.0%
2016	253	−1.9%
Source: Statistics Canada via Saskatchewan Bureau of Statistics

In the 2021 Census of Population conducted by Statistics Canada, the RM of Oakdale No. 320 had a population of 216 living in 95 of its 118 total private dwellings, a change of −14.6% from its 2016 population of 253. With a land area of 826.79 km^{2} (319.23 sq mi), it had a population density of 0.3/km^{2} (0.7/sq mi) in 2021.

In the 2016 Census of Population, the RM of Oakdale No. 320 recorded a population of 253 living in 97 of its 114 total private dwellings, a −1.9% change from its 2011 population of 258. With a land area of 805.92 km^{2} (311.17 sq mi), it had a population density of 0.3/km^{2} (0.8/sq mi) in 2016.

== Government ==
The RM of Oakdale No. 320 is governed by an elected municipal council and an appointed administrator that meets on the second Monday of every month. The reeve of the RM is Darwin Whitfield while its administrator is Gillain Lund. The RM's office is located in Coleville.

== Education ==
Current school divisions

- Sun West School Division No. 207 — As of 2006, the Kindersley School Division and 5 other divisions were amalgamated into the Sun West School Division.

Former amalgamated school divisions

- Kindersley Schoold Division No. 34 (1947–2006)

Former 'single-room schoolhouse' school districts

- Algoma School District No. 2876 (1914–1946)
- Ashford School District No. 3773 (1916–1947)
- Avoca School District No. 3363 (1914–1947)
- Beaufield School District No. 3169 (1913–1947)
- Bonn School District No. 2475 (1909–1947)
- Buffalo Coulee School District No. 4278 (1919–1947)
- Coleville School District No. 3645 (1915–1946)
- Driver School District No. 811 (1912–1947)
- Elm Point School District No. 2779 (1911–1947)
- Eureka School District No. 2174 (1908–1947)
- Gleneath School District No. 4453 (1921–1947)
- Hopedale School District No. 346 (1911–1947)
- McKellar School District No. 584 (1910–1947)
- St. Florence School District No. 4299 (1920–1947)
- Somme School District No. 4127 (19??-1947)
- Teo Lake School District No. 1358 (1912–1947)
- Warwick School District No. 3080 (1913–1940)

== Transportation ==
Rail

- C.N.R. Dodsland Branch — served Beaufield, Coleville, and Driver
- C.N.R. Outlook-Kerrobert Branch — served Ermine

Roads

- Highway 21
- Highway 307 — serves Coleville
