= CKVX-FM =

Radio station in Kindersley, Saskatchewan

Coordinates: 51°27′18″N 109°08′44″W

- Kindersley, Saskatchewan; Canada
- Broadcast area: West Central Saskatchewan
- Frequency: 104.9 MHz
- Branding: Country 104.9

Programming
- Format: Country
- Affiliations: Kindersley Klippers

Ownership
- Owner: Golden West Broadcasting
- Sister stations: CJYM, CFYM

History
- First air date: 2005

Technical information
- Class: C
- ERP: vertical polarization: 66,000 watts horizontal polarization: 100,000 watts
- HAAT: 341.2 metres (1,119 ft)

Links
- Website: westcentralonline.com/country-104

CKVX-FM is a Canadian radio station broadcasting at 104.9 FM with a country format branded as Country 104.9. Licensed to Kindersley, Saskatchewan, it serves west central Saskatchewan. It first began broadcasting in 2005. The station is currently owned by Golden West Broadcasting.

The CKVX call sign was originally used by Chilliwack, British Columbia radio station CKKS-FM between 2000 and 2004.

In August 2016, CKVX increased its power to 100,000 watts; the new signal covers the majority of west central Saskatchewan, although the station will primarily focus on serving Kindersley and Rosetown. In September 2016, CKVX-FM flipped to country.
