= Luseland =

Town in Saskatchewan, Canada

- Town
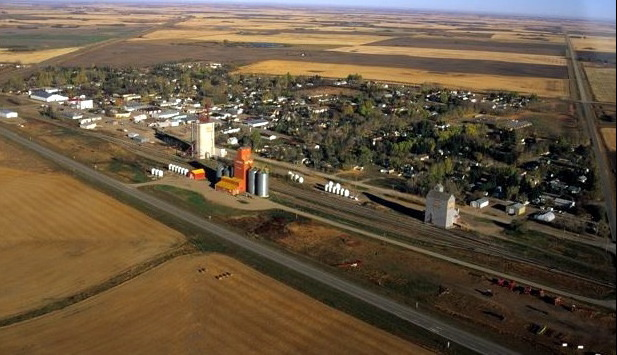
- Aerial view of Luseland

- Location of Luseland in Saskatchewan Luseland (Canada)
- Coordinates: 52°04′47″N 109°23′24″W
- Country: Canada
- Province: Saskatchewan
- Rural Municipality: Progress
- Post Office established: 1910

Government
  - Mayor: Kathy Wurz
  - Administrator: Krystal Bazylinski
  - Governing body: Luseland Town Council
  - MLA Kindersley: Bill Boyd
  - MP Battlefords—Lloydminster: Rosemarie Falk

Area
  - Total: 1.53 km^{2} (0.59 sq mi)

Population (2011)
  - Total: 566
  - Density: 369.6/km^{2} (957/sq mi)
- Time zone: UTC−06:00 (CST)
  - Summer (DST): UTC−05:00 (CDT)
- Postal code: S0L 2A0
- Highways: Highway 31
- Website: Town website

Luseland is a town in the Rural Municipality of Progress No. 351, in the west-central region of Saskatchewan. The town's population as of the 2006 Canadian Census was 571, down 5% from the 2001 Census.

It is known as the hometown of the Canadian business magnate Jim Pattison.

== History ==
The Métis people led explorer John Palliser into this district in 1858, and it was he who saw most of the country as barren and unsuitable for agriculture. [5] Botanist John Macoun, traversing the same country in 1881 after the buffalo had been nearly wiped out, saw the country as an agricultural Eden. [6] A quarter of a century later, the first settlers arrived in the Luseland district, drawn by accounts of the rich pastures of prairie wool along the Grass Lake valley. It is for this reason that Luseland became one of the most productive wheat-growing areas in the west, boasting as many as six grain elevators.

George Hoddinott and the Abbs Bros. were the first settlers, applying for a homestead, called Abbnott, in April 1906. Luseland, derived from the Luse Land and Development Company, was officially declared a village on Dec 10, 1910. Established by Mr. J.F. Luse in 1904, with headquarters in St. Paul, Minnesota, its goal was to establish a German Lutheran colony for families that had initially settled in the mid-western states of Nebraska, Indiana, Wisconsin, Illinois, and Minnesota, after they had been forced to leave their Russian colonies along the Volga River. In September, 1907, Sam Luse, son of the Company president wrote the Hon. Frank Oliver, Minister of the Interior, indicating that the Co. had made a deal to purchase Canadian Northern Railway lands, provided they could secure the remaining homesteads in Townships 35 and 36, Range 24–26. The district was already located within the large German Catholic block settlement of St. Joseph's Colony, established in 1905. In November 1907, the Commission of public lands advised that though German Lutherans would make desirable settlers it was contrary to regulations to reserve homestead lands in the manner suggested. In January 1908, the Canadian representative of the Luse Co. wrote Mr. Oliver that they had closed a deal for 100,000 acres (400 km^{2}) from the railway company along with a deal with the Evangelical German Lutheran Church for settlement. Mr. Oliver replied that they were unable to grant this request. Meanwhile, British-Canadian settlers had begun to take up homesteads in 1907, and large numbers, particularly from Ontario, began to arrive in 1908, lured by stories of the rich dark soils along the Grass Lake valley. By 1909, the Luse Land Company had arranged for several special train loads of settlers to travel to the closest station in Scott, then overland by horse and carts with their livestock and belongings to the new land. Many of these immigrants were Russian Volga Germans who had been lured from their initial settlements in the mid-western states by Canadian government propaganda and the promise of a German Lutheran colony but instead found themselves within the large St. Joseph's Catholic colony, living side by side with British-Canadian settlers. More German settlers arrived during the next two decades, most of them coming directly from the Russian Volga colonies as conditions deteriorated there.

Initially the German Catholics established country parishes throughout St. Joseph's Colony, but over time, with improvements in roads and transportation these country churches were abandoned, along with homesteads, and have become shrines like the beautiful Holy Rosary Church at Reward, and St. Anthony stone church at Grosswerder. The first German Lutheran Church was erected in the town in 1914 and the first Methodist/Presbyterian (United) Church was erected in 1913. Because religion was such an essential part of pioneering life, and because of the diverse cultural mosaic, the small town of Luseland once boasted six churches.

== Geography ==
Luseland, elevation 701 metres (2,300 ft), is situated directly beneath the apex of Palliser's Triangle, on the southern fringe of the aspen parklands, between the arms of two ancient glacial valleys that originate in the Neutral Hills (glacial moraines), just across the Alberta border to the west. Hearts Hill, the most prominent feature in the Luseland district, is the most eastern outlier of the moraine fields, separating the Buffalo Coulee system that drains into the South Saskatchewan River valley, from the Grass Lake system that drains eastward into Tramping Lake. Finer glacial sediments along these valleys gave rise to the rich black chernozemic soils that supported the Fescue grasslands, or prairie wool as it was called by early settlers, and, consequently, to the "buffalo highways" that led toward the Neutral Hills and the sand lands around Sounding Lake. These glacial channels were very important for the earliest aboriginal peoples and it is no accident that a major archaeological site is located just across the border in Bodo, Alberta, and that many ancient artifacts and tent rings can be found around Hearts Hill and Cactus Lake. As war escalated in the 19th century between the westward expanding Cree, middlemen with the Hudson's Bay Company, and the equine-proficient Blackfeet, the hilly moraine country became neutral territory where neither tribe ventured, and the last of the bison herds took refuge. These herds, following their ancient pathways along the Fescue-flanked valleys and long alkali marshes, were eventually pursued by the Métis "hivernants" who based their winter operations out of Round Plain, south of present-day Saskatoon.

=== Ecology ===
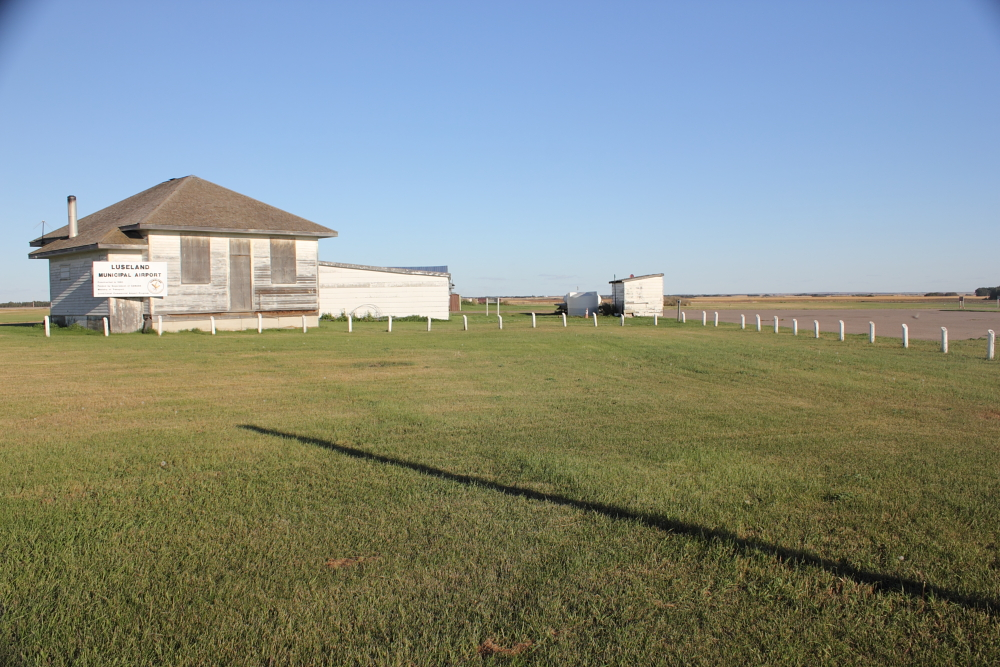
Luseland Airport and countryside

Situated as it is, directly beneath the apex of Palliser's Triangle, the region was once dominated by short-grass (Spear Grass and Blue Grama) on lighter soils and Fescue grass on the heavier clay soils along glacial river valleys (Grass Lake and Buffalo Coulee) that drained southeast from the moraine fields (Neutral Hills). Luseland is situated on the southern slope of a low ridge that separates the two main glacial channels, and looks out over the flat basin containing Shallow Lake, a large alkali pan, surrounded by the sandier soils of the RM of Progress Community Pasture, that contain the most extensive area of native short-grass prairie in the area. The last of the bison were killed off in the region by 1883, and, along with the elimination of prairie fires that regularly swept through the region, the vegetation began to change. When the first settlers arrived in 1905, the area was "bald" prairie littered with bison bones. Willows immediately began springing up around the numerous potholes, and aspens followed, such that the Luseland now marks the southern fringe of the Aspen Parkland Belt. Because of their underlying richness and organic content of 7 - 8 percent, the Fescue grasslands (or prairie wool as it was called ) were quickly broken, leaving only small fragments today. Prior to settlement, the ecosystem was shaped by periods of drought, frequent fires and intense but sporadic grazing by large herds of bison which tended to follow the richer Fescue pastures along the valleys, and find water and mineral salts in the long marshes in the valley bottoms. Antelope were the only other abundant grazer. The Buffalo Wolf was the top predator, and its dens were often located in the sandier soils and steep coulees associated with Wolf or Silver Willow ( known as mahihkanahtik or Wolf Shrub in the Cree language). Coyotes were abundant and formed part of the scavenger guild. The small Swift Fox found shelter and avoided the larger predators by living in burrows.

== Demographics ==
In the 2021 Census of Population conducted by Statistics Canada, Luseland had a population of 559 living in 274 of its 311 total private dwellings, a change of −10.3% from its 2016 population of 623. With a land area of 1.59 km^{2} (0.61 sq mi), it had a population density of 351.6/km^{2} (910.6/sq mi) in 2021.

Canada census – Luseland community profile

	2021	2011
Population	559 (-10.3% from 2016)	566 (-0.9% from 2006)
Land area	1.59 km^{2} (0.61 sq mi)	1.53 km^{2} (0.59 sq mi)
Population density	351.3/km^{2} (910/sq mi)	369.6/km^{2} (957/sq mi)
Median age	43.6 (M: 44.4, F: 43.2)	47.3 (M: 46.7, F: 48.3)
Private dwellings	311 (total) 274 (occupied)	298 (total)
Median household income	$69,500

References: 2021 2011

== Services ==
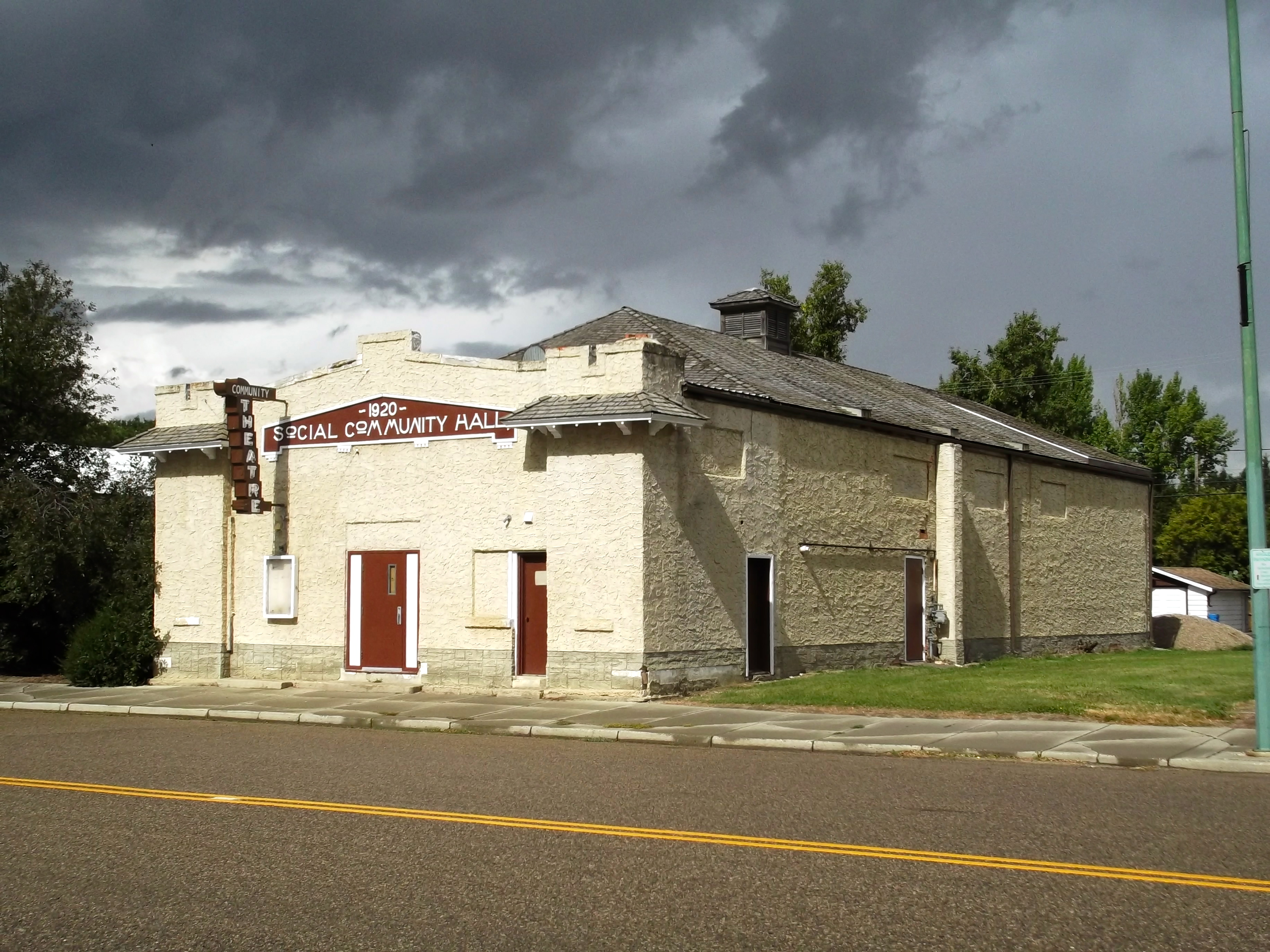
Luseland Community Theatre is a listed heritage site

Luseland has many amenities. These include a swimming pool, skating rink, library, large historical museum, two parks, and a movie theatre.

== School ==
Luseland School is a Kindergarten to Grade 12 school with an enrollment of approximately 190 students. A full range of courses are available, as well as many extra-curricular programs.

== Prairie Park ==
Prairie Park is located in the middle of town, occupying the site which was once the schoolyard of Luseland's first brick schoolhouse. It now is a natural prairie environment, with the natural grasses, flowers and terrain found in the area before it was settled.
