= Rosetown, Saskatchewan =

Town in Saskatchewan, Canada

Rosetown
- Town
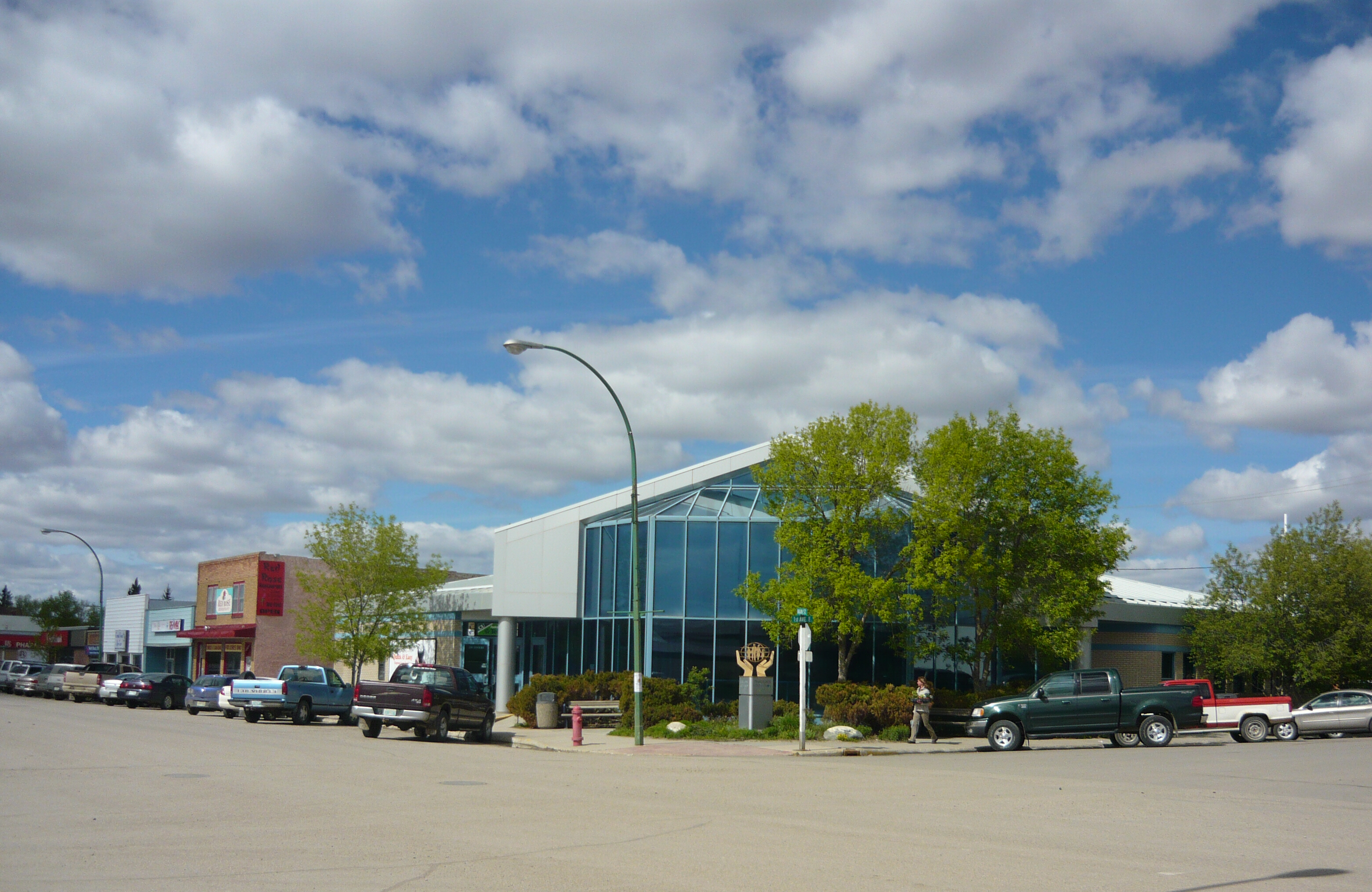
- Rosetown's Main Street
- Motto: Discover Life Here
- Location within St. Andrews No. 287 Location within Saskatchewan
- Coordinates: 51°33′N 107°59′W
- Country: Canada
- Province: Saskatchewan
- Rural municipalities (RM): St. Andrews No. 287
- Post office founded: 1907-09-01
- Village established: 1909
- Town incorporated: 1910

Government
  - Mayor: Trevor Hay
  - MP: Kelly Block
  - MLA: Jim Reiter, Saskatchewan Party

Area
  - Total: 12.14 km^{2} (4.69 sq mi)

Population (2016)
  - Total: 2,451
  - Density: 201.9/km^{2} (522.9/sq mi)
  - Summer (DST): CST
- Website: www.rosetown.ca

Rosetown is a town in the Canadian province of Saskatchewan, at the junction of provincial Highway 7 and Highway 4, approximately 115 kilometres southwest of Saskatoon. The town's motto, "The Heart of the Wheat Belt", reflects its history of being a farming community. It is within the Rural Municipality of St. Andrews No. 287.

Rosetown is represented federally by the electoral district of Carlton Trail—Eagle Creek and provincialy by the electoral district of Rosetown-Elrose. Rosetown belongs to census division 12 for enumeration purposes.

Rosetown won the 2004 Provincial Communities in Bloom.

== History ==
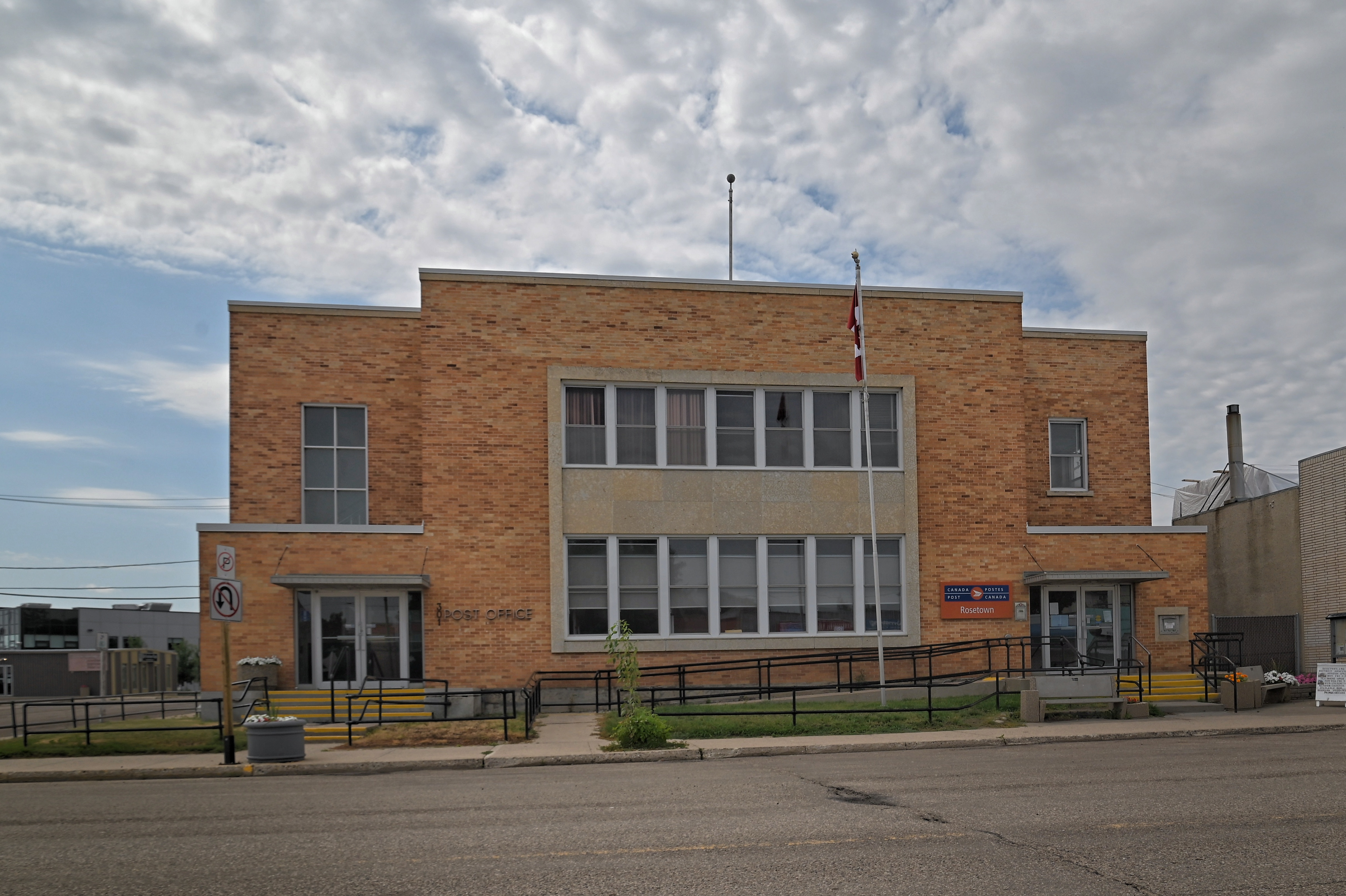
Post office

On September 14, 1905, James and Anne Rose migrated from Lancashire, England, to an area of Saskatchewan. They were the first settlers in the area now known as Rosetown. Later, in 1907, a group of people from the area, wanting a post office, made an application for one. As a name had to be given to the post office, the group dedicated it to the town's most senior settlers, the Roses. As the name "Rose" was already taken, the group added "town" to it to create "Rosetown". The post office opened on September 7, 1907.

A Jewish colony was established near Rosetown after 1906.

Rosetown became a village on August 29, 1909, after Wilrod Bifair sold his homestead for $12 an acre to the Canadian Northern Railway. Village status was granted on August 4, 1909, when the population reached 500 people. W.G. King, W.R. Ferguson, and N.B. Douglas formed the village council in the same year. The first village council meeting was held on September 27, 1909. W.G. King established the first business in the village in 1909. Later that year he built three other stores at different locations.

Much of the town was destroyed in a cyclone on June 16, 1923.

== Demographics ==
In the 2021 Census of Population conducted by Statistics Canada, Rosetown had a population of 2,507 living in 1,112 of its 1,224 total private dwellings, a change of 2.3% from its 2016 population of 2,451. With a land area of 11.59 km^{2} (4.47 sq mi), it had a population density of 216.3/km^{2} (560.2/sq mi) in 2021.

Canada census – Rosetown community profile

| | 2021 | 2016 | 2011 |
| Population | 2,507 (+2.3% from 2016) | 2,451 (5.8% from 2011) | 2,317 (1.8% from 2006) |
| Land area | 11.59 km^{2} (4.47 sq mi) | 12.14 km^{2} (4.69 sq mi) | 12.14 km^{2} (4.69 sq mi) |
| Population density | 216.3/km^{2} (560/sq mi) | 201.9/km^{2} (523/sq mi) | 190.8/km^{2} (494/sq mi) |
| Median age | 44.8 (M: 41.6, F: 48.4) |
| Private dwellings | 1,115 (total) | 1,187 (total) | 1,121 (total) |
| Median household income |

References: 2021 2016 2011

== Climate ==
Rosetown experiences a semi-arid climate (Köppen climate classification) BSk). Precipitation is quite low, with the majority of it falling in the summer months.

The highest temperature ever recorded in Rosetown was 43.9 °C (111 °F) on 4 July 1937. The coldest temperature ever recorded was −47.2 °C (−53 °F) on 23 January 1943.

Climate data for Rosetown, 1981–2010 normals, extremes 1937–present
| Month | Jan | Feb | Mar | Apr | May | Jun | Jul | Aug | Sep | Oct | Nov | Dec | Year |
|---|---|---|---|---|---|---|---|---|---|---|---|---|---|
| Record high °C (°F) | 10.0 (50.0) | 11.0 (51.8) | 24.3 (75.7) | 35.6 (96.1) | 36.0 (96.8) | 42.2 (108.0) | 43.9 (111.0) | 43.3 (109.9) | 37.0 (98.6) | 33.3 (91.9) | 22.2 (72.0) | 16.1 (61.0) | 43.9 (111.0) |
| Mean daily maximum °C (°F) | −9.7 (14.5) | −5.6 (21.9) | 1.4 (34.5) | 12.2 (54.0) | 19.0 (66.2) | 23.2 (73.8) | 25.8 (78.4) | 25.8 (78.4) | 19.1 (66.4) | 11.6 (52.9) | −1.1 (30.0) | −7.4 (18.7) | 9.5 (49.1) |
| Daily mean °C (°F) | −15.2 (4.6) | −11.1 (12.0) | −3.9 (25.0) | 4.9 (40.8) | 11.3 (52.3) | 15.9 (60.6) | 18.2 (64.8) | 17.8 (64.0) | 11.5 (52.7) | 4.5 (40.1) | −6.1 (21.0) | −12.7 (9.1) | 2.9 (37.2) |
| Mean daily minimum °C (°F) | −20.6 (−5.1) | −16.4 (2.5) | −9.3 (15.3) | −2.4 (27.7) | 3.6 (38.5) | 8.6 (47.5) | 10.6 (51.1) | 9.8 (49.6) | 3.8 (38.8) | −2.7 (27.1) | −11.1 (12.0) | −17.9 (−0.2) | −3.7 (25.3) |
| Record low °C (°F) | −47.2 (−53.0) | −43 (−45) | −42.2 (−44.0) | −30 (−22) | −12.2 (10.0) | −5 (23) | −2.8 (27.0) | −3 (27) | −13.9 (7.0) | −25 (−13) | −35.1 (−31.2) | −42 (−44) | −47.2 (−53.0) |
| Average precipitation mm (inches) | 12.9 (0.51) | 6.0 (0.24) | 15.1 (0.59) | 19.5 (0.77) | 44.2 (1.74) | 57.1 (2.25) | 57.3 (2.26) | 41.1 (1.62) | 29.2 (1.15) | 17.2 (0.68) | 15.2 (0.60) | 12.4 (0.49) | 327.0 (12.87) |
| Average rainfall mm (inches) | 0.5 (0.02) | 0.2 (0.01) | 3.8 (0.15) | 14.0 (0.55) | 39.9 (1.57) | 57.1 (2.25) | 57.3 (2.26) | 41.1 (1.62) | 27.1 (1.07) | 12.4 (0.49) | 2.6 (0.10) | 0.1 (0.00) | 256.2 (10.09) |
| Average snowfall cm (inches) | 12.4 (4.9) | 5.8 (2.3) | 11.3 (4.4) | 5.5 (2.2) | 4.2 (1.7) | 0.0 (0.0) | 0.0 (0.0) | 0.0 (0.0) | 2.1 (0.8) | 4.8 (1.9) | 12.7 (5.0) | 12.2 (4.8) | 70.8 (27.9) |
Source: Environment Canada

== Education ==
Walter Aseltine School is the elementary school in Rosetown named after a member of parliament Walter Aseltine. Rosetown Central High School provides secondary school education for Rosetown and surrounding rural areas. Both schools are part of the Sun West School Division. The Sun West School Division Office which provides education to west-central Saskatchewan is in Rosetown.

Students in Kindergarten to Grade 6 attend Walter Aseltine School and Grades 7 to 12 attend the Rosetown Central High School. The average graduating class is 45 to 60 students depending on the year.

Prairie West Regional College provides post secondary education.

== Media ==
Radio

- 1330 AM - CJYM, classic hits
- 104.9 FM - CKVX-FM, adult contemporary

Newspapers

- Rosetown Eagle

== Sports ==
The Rosetown Red Wings of the Sask Valley Hockey League play out of SaskCan Centre. They were formerly part of Allan Cup Hockey West.

== Transportation ==
The first transportation was provided by a Red River Cart Trail called "Old Bone Trail" as well as the historic Swift Current–Battleford Trail. The town grew in 1910 once the Canadian National Railway track reached Rosetown.

Rosetown Airport (TC LID: CJX4) is near Rosetown. Both Highway 7 and Highway 4 serve vehicular traffic to and from Rosetown.

== Notable people ==
- Lloyd Arntzen, musician, school teacher
- Walter Aseltine, PC, BA, QC was a Canadian parliamentarian and senator.
- Walter Farquharson, Moderator of the United Church of Canada
- Rob Friend, a former professional and Canadian international soccer player
- Randy Ireland, a Buffalo Sabres Goaltender
- Sherry Middaugh née Sherry Hamel, a Canadian curler.
- Robert (Bob) Ogle, a Roman Catholic priest, broadcaster and Member of the House of Commons of Canada.
- Jim Reiter, Canadian politician.
- Eldon Woolliams, an Alberta politician

== See also ==
- List of communities in Saskatchewan
- List of towns in Saskatchewan
