= Sun West School Division =

School district in Saskatchewan, Canada

Sun West School Division Sun West School Division No. 207

Location
- 501 – 1st St. W. Rosetown, Saskatchewan, Canada 19 towns, 19 colonies Canada

District information
- Chair of the board: Michele Whitfield
- Director of education: Vicki Moore
- Schools: 42 (2024)
- Budget: CA$70.5 million (2013-2014)

Students and staff
- Students: 4,781 (2025)
- Staff: 769.3 (2023)

Other information
- Website: www.sunwestsd.ca

Located in west-central Saskatchewan, the Sun West School Division covers approximately 25,600 square kilometers. On its east side, the Division includes schools in Davidson and Kenaston, whose attendance areas include students on the east side of Highway 11. The Alberta border serves as the Division's limits on the west, with the South Saskatchewan River providing its most southerly border. The Division extends as far north as Landis and Biggar. Sun West School Division No. 207 belongs to Department of Saskatchewan Learning Division 4 along with Englefeld Protestant Separate S.D. No. 132, Horizon School Division No. 205, Prairie Spirit School Division No. 206, Saskatoon School Division No. 13, Greater Saskatoon Catholic School Division - (St. Pauls R.C.S.S.D No. 20) and Division scolaire francophone 310.

Prior to 2006, the area currently administered by Sun West included six school divisions. These were Kindersley, Rosetown, Eston-Elrose, Outlook, Davidson and Biggar School Divisions. on January 1, 2006, these six legacy divisions were combined to form the Sun West School Division as part of the provincial government's re-structuring of rural school divisions in Saskatchewan.

The Sun West Division office is located in Rosetown, Saskatchewan at 501-1st Street West.

The School Division administers 42 schools; of these 13 are Kindergarten to Grade 12 schools, 1 is a middle school, 6 are elementary schools, 3 are high schools and 19 are Hutterite Colony Schools.

Enrollment in Sun West Schools is approximately 4,700 students.

Approximately 760 people work for the Sun West School Division on a permanent full or part-time basis with several hundred more employed occasionally as substitute teachers or spare bus drivers.

Sun West employs approximately 350 teachers, 60 Principals and Vice-principals, 140 Educational Assistants, 100 Bus Drivers, 50 Caretakers, 30 Clerical Staff and 25 Library Staff as well as a small number of Consultants, Counsellors, Psychologists and specialists such as Speech-Language Pathologists.

Only 25 people, or less than 4% of the Division's total workforce, is employed in Division administration positions. The 6 legacy school divisions employed a total of 35.4 people in Division administration positions, while Sun West employs only 25 in the equivalent positions, including only 10 in senior management compared to the 17.7 employed in the legacy school divisions.

Approximately half, or 2400 students, ride buses to and from school in the Sun West School Division. Sun West buses log approximately 19,000 kilometers every school day.
