= Dodsland, Saskatchewan =

Village in Saskatchewan, Canada

Dodsland
- Village
- Village of Dodsland
- Location of Dodsland in Saskatchewan Dodsland (Canada)
- Coordinates: 51.801°N 108.838°W
- Country: Canada
- Province: Saskatchewan
- Region: Central
- Census division: 13
- Rural municipality: Winslow No. 319
- Post office Founded: 1914-01-01

Government
  - Type: Municipal
  - Governing body: Dodsland Village Council
  - Mayor: Ryan Neumeier
  - Administrator: Amy Sittler

Area
  - Total: 2.93 km^{2} (1.13 sq mi)

Population (2016)
  - Total: 207
  - Density: 73.4/km^{2} (190/sq mi)
- Time zone: UTC-6 (CST)
- Postal code: S0L 0V0
- Area code: 306
- Highways: Highway 31 Highway 658

Dodsland (2016 population: 215) is a village in the Canadian province of Saskatchewan within the Rural Municipality of Winslow No. 319 and Census Division No. 13.

== History ==
Dodsland incorporated as a village on August 23, 1913.

== Demographics ==
Population history (1981–2016)
Year	Pop.	±%
1981	272	—
1986	285	+4.8%
1991	269	−5.6%
1996	241	−10.4%
2001	211	−12.4%
2006	207	−1.9%
2011	212	+2.4%
2016	215	+1.4%
Source: Statistics Canada via Saskatchewan Bureau of Statistics

In the 2021 Census of Population conducted by Statistics Canada, Dodsland had a population of 215 living in 92 of its 114 total private dwellings, a change of 0% from its 2016 population of 215. With a land area of 2.86 km^{2} (1.10 sq mi), it had a population density of 75.2/km^{2} (194.7/sq mi) in 2021.

In the 2016 Census of Population, the Village of Dodsland recorded a population of 215 living in 97 of its 111 total private dwellings, a 1.4% change from its 2011 population of 212. With a land area of 2.93 km^{2} (1.13 sq mi), it had a population density of 73.4/km^{2} (190.1/sq mi) in 2016.

== Notable people ==
- Ed Chynoweth, Hockey Hall of Fame executive, president of the Western Hockey League and Canadian Hockey League, namesake of the Ed Chynoweth Cup
- Don Gillen, played in the NHL for the Philadelphia Flyers and Hartford Whalers
- Bob Hoffmeyer, Former NHL defenceman
- Brad McCrimmon, Former NHL defenceman and coach, Stanley Cup Champion (1989), killed in the 2011 Lokomotiv Yaroslavl plane crash

== See also ==
- List of communities in Saskatchewan
- List of villages in Saskatchewan
