= Kindersley =

Town in Saskatchewan, Canada

- Town
- Town of Kindersley
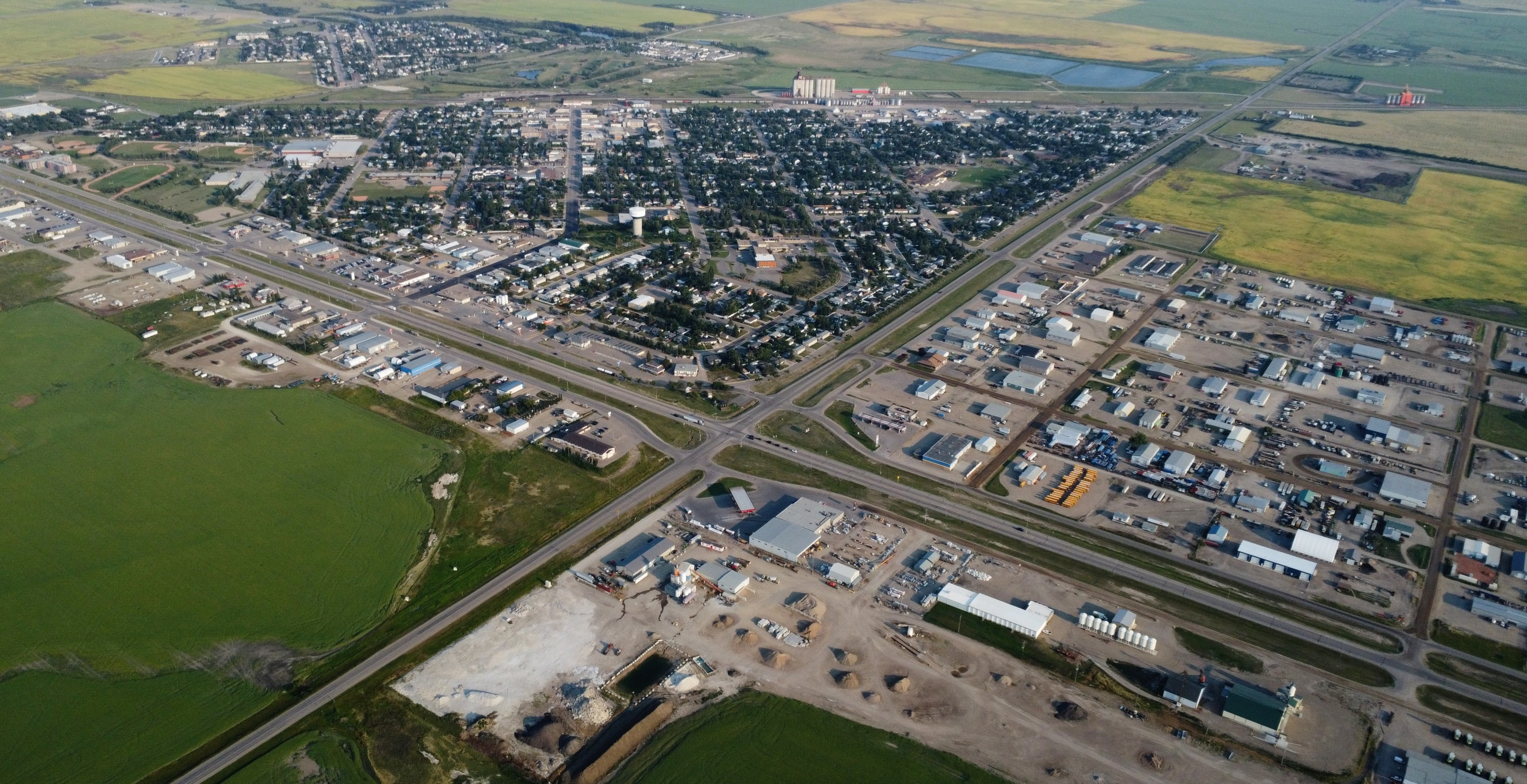
- An aerial photograph of the town of Kindersley

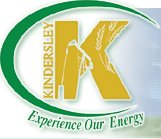
- Flag Seal Coat of arms
- Nickname: The Hub of West Central Saskatchewan
- Motto: "Experience Our Energy"
- Location of Kindersley within Saskatchewan Kindersley (Canada)
- Coordinates: 51°28′04″N 109°09′24″W
- Country: Canada
- Province: Saskatchewan
- Census division: No. 13
- Rural municipality: Kindersley No. 290
- Incorporated Town: 1910

Government
  - Mayor: Ken Francis
  - Governing body: Kindersley Town Council
  - MLA: Kim Gartner
  - MP: Jeremy Patzer

Area
  - Total: 13.23 km^{2} (5.11 sq mi)

Population (2021)
  - Total: 4,567
  - Density: 353.7/km^{2} (916/sq mi)
- Time zone: UTC−6 (CST)
- Postal Codes: S0L 1S0 & S0L 1S1
- Area code: 306
- Highways: Highway 7 / Highway 21
- Website: www.kindersley.ca

Kindersley is a town surrounded by the Rural Municipality of Kindersley No. 290 in west-central Saskatchewan, Canada. It is located along Highway 7, a primary highway linking Calgary, Alberta and Saskatoon, Saskatchewan, at its junction with Highway 21. With a population of 4,567 in 2021, it is an established industrial base for the resource-rich west-central region of the province and a service centre to the oil and gas industry and agriculture production.

== History ==
Kindersley was incorporated in 1910, and named after Sir Robert Kindersley, Governor of the Hudson's Bay Company (1915–25) and a major shareholder in the Canadian Northern Railway, which was nationalized and amalgamated into Canadian National Railways in 1918. Canadian Northern had made Kindersley a divisional point on its line between Saskatoon and Calgary. In 2016, having sustained a population of more than 5,000 for several years (meeting the provincial criteria), the town of Kindersley applied to the province of Saskatchewan for city status. Although official census information from 2011 indicated an official population below 5,000, the town disputed the accuracy of those numbers. As of 2022, city status has yet to be granted, and as noted below the official federal census for 2021 shows its population still below the 5,000 threshold.

== Demographics ==
In the 2021 Census of Population conducted by Statistics Canada, Kindersley had a population of 4,567 living in 1,832 of its 2,081 total private dwellings, a change of −0.7% from its 2016 population of 4,597. With a land area of 12.91 km^{2} (4.98 sq mi), it had a population density of 353.8/km^{2} (916.2/sq mi) in 2021.

Canada census – Kindersley community profile

	2021	2016	2011
Population	4,567 (-0.7% from 2016)	4,597 (-2.3% from 2011)	4,678 (6.0% from 2006)
Land area	12.91 km^{2} (4.98 sq mi)	13.23 km^{2} (5.11 sq mi)	12.55 km^{2} (4.85 sq mi)
Population density	353.7/km^{2} (916/sq mi)	347.5/km^{2} (900/sq mi)	347/km^{2} (900/sq mi)
Median age	40.0 (M: 38.8, F: 41.2)
Private dwellings	2,081 (total) 1,832 (occupied)	2,078 (total)	2,083 (total)
Median household income	$89,000

Notes: Statistics Canada has revised its 2016 census results for Kindersley.
References: 2021 2016 2011

== Climate ==
Kindersley experiences a semi-arid climate (Köppen climate classification BSk). Winters are long, cold and dry, while summers are short and warm. Precipitation is low, with an annual average of 325 mm, and is heavily concentrated in the warmer months.

The highest temperature ever recorded in Kindersley was 41.7 °C (107 °F) on 5 July 1937. The coldest temperature ever recorded was −45.0 °C (−49 °F) on 30 January 1969.

The record one-day rainfall is 77.2 mm (3 inches) on July 6, 1991. The record one-day snowfall is 21 cm (8.3 inches) on December 27, 1990.

Climate data for Kindersley Regional Airport, 1981−2010 normals, extremes 1912−present (Note: Extremes in the table below are from Kindersley (August 1912 to December 1971), and Kindersley Regional Airport (January 1972 to present).)
Month	Jan	Feb	Mar	Apr	May	Jun	Jul	Aug	Sep	Oct	Nov	Dec	Year
Record high °C (°F)	10.8 (51.4)	10.7 (51.3)	25.7 (78.3)	34.4 (93.9)	38.9 (102.0)	40.6 (105.1)	41.7 (107.1)	40.0 (104.0)	37.2 (99.0)	32.8 (91.0)	23.3 (73.9)	12.9 (55.2)	41.7 (107.1)
Mean daily maximum °C (°F)	−8.5 (16.7)	−6.2 (20.8)	1.2 (34.2)	11.6 (52.9)	18.1 (64.6)	22.1 (71.8)	25.2 (77.4)	24.6 (76.3)	18.8 (65.8)	10.9 (51.6)	−0.1 (31.8)	−6.8 (19.8)	9.2 (48.6)
Daily mean °C (°F)	−13.8 (7.2)	−11.7 (10.9)	−4.1 (24.6)	4.8 (40.6)	11.0 (51.8)	15.5 (59.9)	18.1 (64.6)	17.3 (63.1)	11.6 (52.9)	4.2 (39.6)	−5.3 (22.5)	−12.0 (10.4)	3.0 (37.4)
Mean daily minimum °C (°F)	−19.0 (−2.2)	−17.0 (1.4)	−9.4 (15.1)	−2.1 (28.2)	3.8 (38.8)	8.8 (47.8)	11.0 (51.8)	10.0 (50.0)	4.4 (39.9)	−2.5 (27.5)	−10.5 (13.1)	−17.1 (1.2)	−3.3 (26.1)
Record low °C (°F)	−45.0 (−49.0)	−43.4 (−46.1)	−37.2 (−35.0)	−30.0 (−22.0)	−15.6 (3.9)	−6.7 (19.9)	−4.4 (24.1)	−2.2 (28.0)	−12.2 (10.0)	−28.3 (−18.9)	−36.1 (−33.0)	−41.2 (−42.2)	−45.0 (−49.0)
Average precipitation mm (inches)	10.9 (0.43)	7.4 (0.29)	11.7 (0.46)	23.5 (0.93)	40.3 (1.59)	67.0 (2.64)	55.8 (2.20)	43.9 (1.73)	28.8 (1.13)	12.8 (0.50)	10.7 (0.42)	12.4 (0.49)	325.1 (12.80)
Average rainfall mm (inches)	0.4 (0.02)	0.2 (0.01)	1.7 (0.07)	15.6 (0.61)	38.3 (1.51)	67.0 (2.64)	55.8 (2.20)	43.9 (1.73)	28.5 (1.12)	8.0 (0.31)	1.9 (0.07)	0.2 (0.01)	261.2 (10.28)
Average snowfall cm (inches)	15.6 (6.1)	10.3 (4.1)	12.9 (5.1)	9.5 (3.7)	2.1 (0.8)	0.0 (0.0)	0.0 (0.0)	0.0 (0.0)	0.8 (0.3)	6.3 (2.5)	12.3 (4.8)	17.2 (6.8)	86.9 (34.2)
Mean monthly sunshine hours	103.5	132.3	177.1	231.6	276.6	276.8	335.7	291.6	223.3	169.1	106.2	92.4	2,416.3
Percentage possible sunshine	39.8	46.9	48.2	55.8	57.2	55.8	67.2	64.4	58.7	50.9	39.7	37.6	51.8
Source: Environment Canada

== Economy ==
The Bakken shale oil and gas play, driven by hydraulic fracturing technologies, has contributed to Kindersley's economy since 2009. Kindersley sells its treated municipal wastewater to a local oilfield service company to use in hydraulic fracturing.

== Kindersley Regional Park ==
Kindersley Regional Park (51.4498°N 109.1451°W), founded in 1968, is located on the south side of Kindersley at Motherwell Reservoir. Amenities at the park include a campground, golf course, hiking trails, ball diamonds, fishing, and a picnic area. Non-motorised boats are permitted on the reservoir. The campground has 45 campsites with 30 amp service and six sites with 15 amps for tenting. The golf course is a 9-hole, grass greens course. It is a par 36 with a total of 3,127 yards.

== Events ==
Annual events in Kindersley include the Indoor Rodeo and Trade Show in June and the four-day Goose Festival in September, among numerous sports and cultural activities throughout the rest of the year. Kindersley was chosen as the launch site for the da Vinci Project, Canada's entry to win the Ansari X Prize. The flight was scheduled for October 2004, but circumstances related to the project prevented the flight from taking place. Kindersley celebrated its 100th birthday in 2010.

== Education ==
Kindersley has three schools, all operating within the Sun West School Division. Westberry is an elementary school, Elizabeth is a middle school and the Kindersley Composite School is 9-12. There is also a regional college at the Great Plains Regional College location.

== Sports ==
Kindersley is home to a full-service 9-hole golf course; two world class, fully irrigated baseball diamonds; a 3/8 mile dirt oval speedway, and the West Central Events Centre (WCEC), with two ice surfaces and a curling rink. The WCEC is home to the local SJHL Klippers hockey team. Part of the WCEC, an older arena called Exhibition Stadium, was destroyed by fire on January 8, 2010.

Kindersley has also hosted many sporting events including the 1984 World Youth Baseball Championships, 1990 Men's Provincial Curling Championship, 1994 Saskatchewan Winter Games, 1997 Canadian Mixed Curling Championships, 2001 Men's Provincial Curling Championships, 2007 Provincial Mixed Curling Championships, 2008 Junior Men's and Women's Provincial Curling Championships, 2009 and 2010 Baseball Canada Cup and the 2010 Provincial Scotties Tournament of Hearts (the tournament was moved to Eston because of the fire on January 8, 2010). The arena also hosted Team Canada's World Juniors for the 1991 World Junior Championships in Saskatoon. They used the rink as a practice facility and it was also the venue for a game between Czechoslovakia and Switzerland. The most recent event was the 2014 World Jr. A Challenge put on by Hockey Canada that displayed the best Jr. A players from around the world. Teams from Canada, USA, Russia, Switzerland and Denmark participated

== Media ==
Local media includes The Kindersley Clarion, a weekly newspaper owned by Jamac Publishing Ltd., and two radio stations owned by Golden West Broadcasting: CKVX 104.9 FM and CFYM 1210 AM.

== Notable people ==
- Bob Bourne — ice hockey
- Derek Dorsett — ice hockey
- John-James Ford — writer
- Curtis Glencross — ice hockey
- Glenda Goertzen — author
- Gordon Hahn (1919–2001) — California politician, born in Kindersley
- Dave Lewis — National Hockey League coach
- Greg Paslawski — ice hockey

== See also ==
- List of towns in Saskatchewan
