= CFAC =

Radio station in Calgary, Canada (1922–2026)

Coordinates: 50°59′21″N 113°50′24″W

- Final CFAC logo from 2011 to 2026.
- Calgary, Alberta; Canada
- Broadcast area: Southern Alberta
- Frequency: 960 kHz
- Branding: Sportsnet 960 The Fan

Programming
- Format: Sports
- Affiliations: CBC Radio (1936–1948); Sportsnet Radio; Calgary Flames; Calgary Hitmen; Calgary Wranglers; Toronto Blue Jays Radio Network; Westwood One Sports

Ownership
- Owner: Rogers Radio; (Rogers Media, Inc.)
- Sister stations: CFFR; CHFM-FM; CJAQ-FM; CKAL-DT; CJCO-DT; Sportsnet

History
- First air date: May 1, 1922
- Last air date: July 7, 2026
- Former frequencies: 400 metres (1922–1925); 690 kHz (1925–1933); 930 kHz (1933–1941)

Technical information
- Class: B
- Power: 50,000 watts

Links
- Webcast: Listen live
- Website: www.sportsnet.ca/960

CFAC (960 AM) was a sports radio station serving Calgary, Alberta, Canada. It was owned by Rogers Radio, a division of Rogers Sports & Media, and was branded as Sportsnet 960 The Fan, co-branded with the Sportsnet television channel also owned by Rogers. Its studios were located on 7th Avenue Southwest in downtown Calgary, in the same building as Rogers' other Calgary stations, CFFR, CHFM-FM and CJAQ-FM.

CFAC operated with a power of 50,000 watts 24 hours a day on the regional frequency of 960 AM. The daytime signal was omnidirectional, and the nighttime signal was directional using a three-tower array located on Rainbow Road just east of the Calgary city limits.

== History ==
Organized radio broadcasting began to gain prominence in Canada in early 1922. Initially there wasn't a formal licence category for stations providing entertainment broadcasts intended for the general public, so the earliest stations operated under a mixture of Experimental, Amateur, and governmental authorizations. One of the most prominent pioneer broadcasters was William Walter Westover Grant, who during this time installed radio communication equipment for the Canadian Air Board's Forestry patrol. In 1921 these operations were established at the High River Air Station in southern Alberta. Grant constructed government station VAW at this site, and, in addition to the forestry work, began to make a series of experimental entertainment broadcasts, believed to be the first in western Canada, that were audible approximately 50 miles (80 km) away in Calgary. (In May 1922 Grant founded CFCN (now CKMX) in Calgary.)

In the spring of 1922 the Calgary Herald began to publicize the topic of radio, including Grant's broadcasts. In late April the newspaper installed what it called "the most complete receiving set in Western Canada" at its headquarters, and reported that it had successfully picked up High River concerts on April 27 and April 28. During this same time the Canadian government announced the formal creation of a radio broadcast service, which included the establishment of a "Private Commercial Broadcasting" licence. In late April 1922 an initial group of twenty-three commercial broadcasting station licences was announced, including one issued to the Herald for operation on 400 meters (750 kHz), with the randomly assigned call letters of CHCQ.

CHCQ's transmitter and studio were located in room 1006 on the tenth floor of The Herald Building. The primary technical work was performed by G. J. J. Jermain and S. H. Sturrork, assisted by W. W. Grant at the High River station. The first test transmission began at 2 o'clock on May 1, after the transmitter vacuum tubes had arrived that morning, and the next day's paper reported that "very gratifying success was obtained". Programming included phonograph records plus singing and the playing of a violin by Margaret King of the Palace theatre orchestra. The Herald announced the formal station opening would take place at 8:30 the evening of May 2, beginning with a speech by Frank Freeze, president of the Calgary Board of Trade. This formal debut closed with Margaret King singing "God Save the King".

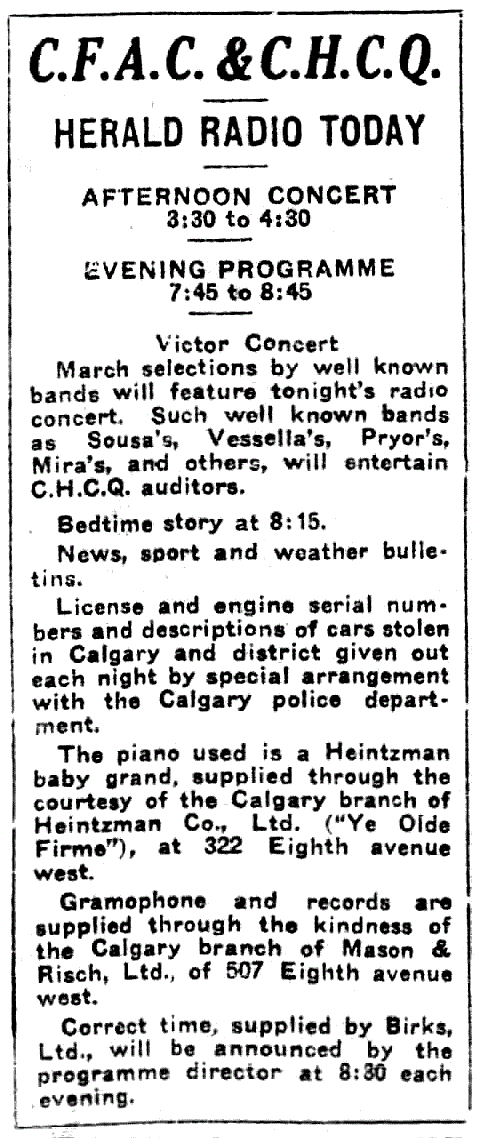
From August to December 1922 the Calgary Herald jointly operated stations CHCQ and CFAC.

The April 1922 initial list of commercial broadcasting station grants had also included a second Calgary station, licensed to George M. Bell and transmitting on 430 meters (698 kHz), with the randomly assigned call sign of CFAC. On August 26 it was announced that the Herald was taking over operation of CFAC as a second, more powerful station. This was in addition to CHCQ, as the announcement noted "The set used during the past four months will not be discarded but is bring installed in the new quarters and will be used in case of accident with the larger machine, thus assuring a continuity of service."

CFAC's broadcast debut under Herald oversight took place at 7.45 p.m. on August 29. Charles Logwood, radio engineer of the Canadian Independent Telephone Co. of Toronto, was credited with installing the CFAC transmitter for the Radio Corporation of Calgary and the Herald. (Logwood, a longtime associate of Lee de Forest, had a broadcasting career that dated back to 1916, over experimental station 2XG in New York City).

The Herald commonly posted its daily broadcasting schedule on its front page. Until December 13, 1922 both CFAC and CHCQ were listed, but beginning the next day only CFAC appeared. Information on CHCQ's fate is limited, although one later review stated that the station closed sometime in 1924. On May 1, 1923 the Herald presented a special program "in celebration of the first anniversary of CFAC", and its historical review combined the earlier broadcasts of CHCQ with those of CFAC that started in August, with a sidebar noting "Before the present radio station of The Herald was built, this set, that was known then as CHCQ, was used to entertain the fans."

Taylor, Pearson & Carson, a company which would eventually become Selkirk Communications, became a minority partner in CFAC in 1934. The station was a private affiliate of the Canadian Radio Broadcasting Commission, which became the Canadian Broadcasting Corporation (CBC) in 1936. The station lost its CBC affiliation in 1948, when the CBC launched CBX to serve both Edmonton and Calgary from a Lacombe transmitter site. Selkirk became the station's sole owner in 1971, and was acquired by Maclean-Hunter in 1989, which in turn was bought out by Rogers Radio in 1994.

Like most early radio stations, CFAC changed frequencies a number of times. Under the provisions of the North American Regional Broadcasting Agreement it moved to its final frequency assignment of 960 kHz in early 1941.

In 1983, CFAC launched CFHC in Canmore to re-broadcast its programs, a practice that continued until 1992. In 2001, CFAC dropped the country music format which had been the station's staple for decades and adopted its later sports format, initially as an affiliate of CHUM Limited's The Team sports network. When the Team network was discontinued in 2002, CFAC retained sports programming but was rebranded as The Fan.

Logo from January to October 2011

Mike Richards in the Morning, running from 6am-10am local time weekdays, was one of the most popular shows on Calgary radio. It often featured fake phone calls, skits and songs (all performed by Richards) from or about local and international sports celebrities. As of 2010, according to BBM's recently introduced PPM ratings, the program became the highest rated sports morning show in the country. However, in January 2011 Richards left The Fan to pursue a job as morning host with TSN Radio 1050 back in his native Ontario. His program was replaced with a show co-hosted by ex-Calgary Flames player Rhett Warrener.

As of August 2008, The Fan was ranked 15th among Calgary radio stations with only a %1.9 share of the audience, arguably due to the niche market of the all-sports AM format. As of the Fall 2011 BBM Radio PPM Data, CFAC was still ranked #15, but increased its share to 3.1.

In January 2011, CFAC became known as "Sportsnet Radio Fan 960", the move came as part of a co-branding initiative with its television counterpart Rogers Sportsnet, amid indications that rival TSN was preparing to launch a competing sports radio network, which launched shortly after in Toronto. The station's on-air identity was then changed to "Sportsnet 960 The Fan" in October 2011.

As of Winter 2020, CFAC was the 17th-most-listened-to radio station in the Calgary market according to a PPM data report released by Numeris.

On July 7, 2026 Rogers Sports and Media announced that CFAC had shut down as one of six radio station closures in various locations across the country, including a second Sportsnet station, CISL in Vancouver. The company cited low advertising revenue and declining audiences as the reason for the shutdown. The company also stated it would move away from broadcasting Calgary Flames games on radio as part of the closure.

== Programming ==
CFAC was the flagship station for live broadcasts of the Calgary Flames, the Calgary Wranglers and the Calgary Hitmen. It also carried live coverage of the Toronto Blue Jays, and was an affiliate of Westwood One Sports.

== On-air staff ==
=== Former ===
- Mike Rogers - retired, July 25, 2013
- Mike Richards - moved to Toronto's TSN Radio 1050, January 2011
- Peter Maher - retired, April 29, 2014
- Ron Butlin and Arthur Ryan Smith - cohosts of a 1950s weekly sports show
