= CKCO =

CKCO may refer to:

- CKCO-DT, a television station (channel 13) licensed to Kitchener, Ontario, Canada
- CIWW, a radio station (1310 AM) licensed to Ottawa, Ontario, Canada, which held the call sign CKCO from 1922 to 1949
