= Belland =

Belland is a surname. Notable people with the surname include:

- Jill Belland, Canadian television personality
- Neil Belland (born 1961), Canadian ice hockey player

Disambiguation: "belland" is finely powdered lead ore. It may cause poisoning in animals and men if allowed to flow into streams or onto grass. Animals so poisoned are said to be "belland(ed)"
