= Mark Sutcliffe =

Mayor of Ottawa

His Worship Mark Sutcliffe
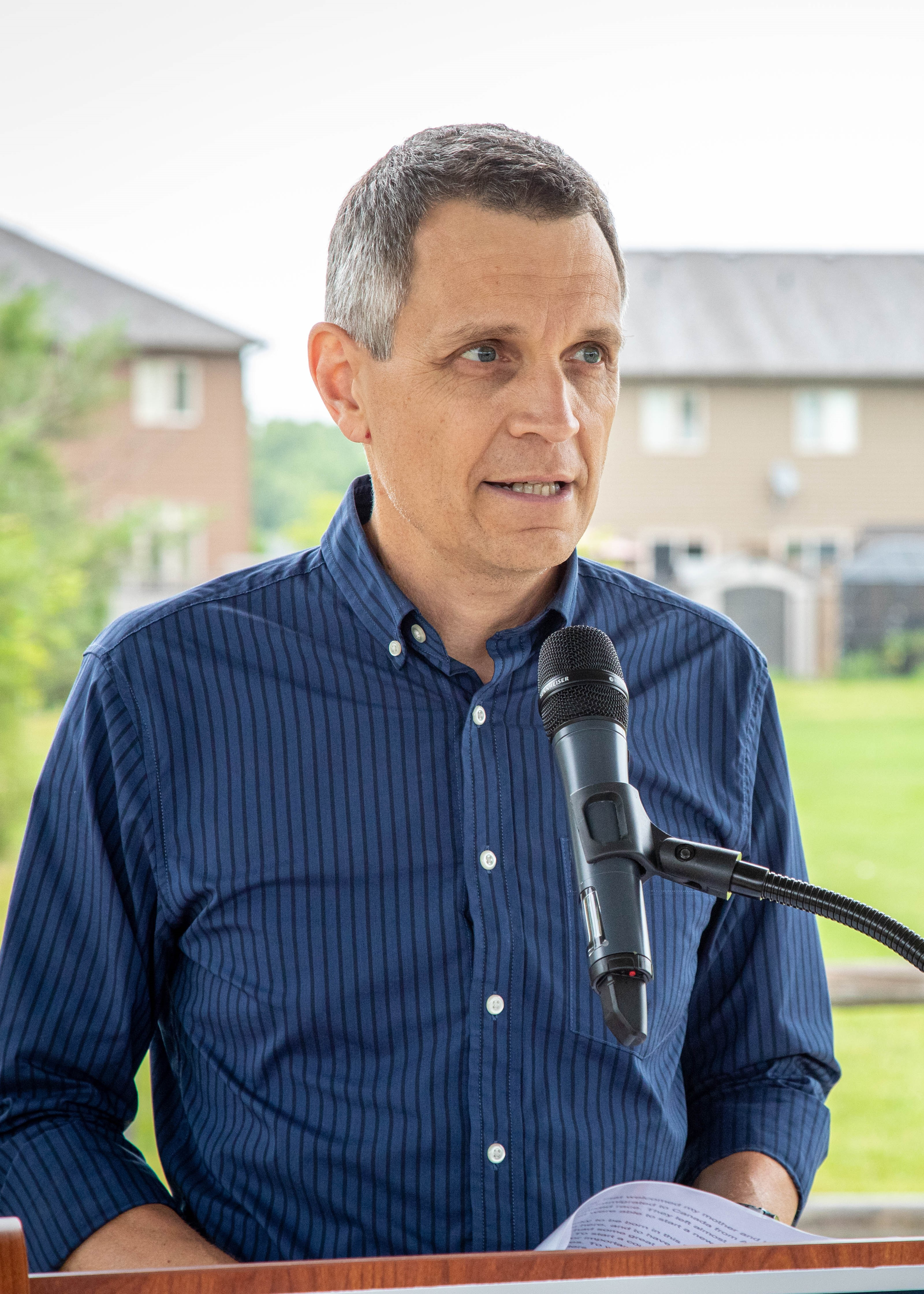
- Sutcliffe in 2022

59th Mayor of Ottawa
- Incumbent
- Assumed office November 15, 2022
- Preceded by: Jim Watson

Personal details
- Born: July 14, 1968 (age 58) Ottawa, Ontario, Canada
- Party: Independent
- Spouse: Ginny Sutcliffe (m. 2008)
- Children: 3
- Parents: John Sutcliffe (father); Florence Ng-Yelim (mother)
- Education: Carleton University (no degree)
- Occupation: Politician; Journalist
- Website: marksutcliffe.ca

Mark Sutcliffe (born July 14, 1968) is a Canadian politician who was elected the 59th mayor of Ottawa in 2022 and re-elected in 2026. Before entering politics, he hosted Ottawa Today on 1310News radio.

== Early life ==
Mark Sutcliffe was born at the Riverside Hospital in Ottawa on July 14, 1968, the son of John Michael Sutcliffe and Florence Ng-Yelim. Sutcliffe's maternal grandfather, Xavier, was born to a Chinese family in Mauritius in 1902. Sutcliffe's maternal grandmother, Yolande, was French, and the two moved to Shanghai. The family moved to Canada during the Chinese Civil War. John Sutcliffe was also an immigrant, coming from Yorkshire in England. John and Florence met while working at the Metropolitan Life Insurance Company.

Sutcliffe grew up in McKellar Park in the city's west end. He graduated from St. Pius X High School, and then studied political science at Carleton University for one year before dropping out to take a job at radio station CHEZ 106. At the same time, he started working as a news reader at CFRA, and then became a news reporter for the Ottawa Business News, and was the first play-by-play announcer for the Ottawa Lynx baseball team. He then founded the Ottawa Business Journal, where he met his wife, Ginny.

== Political career ==
Sutcliffe was elected mayor of Ottawa in the 2022 municipal election. Described as a centrist, Sutcliffe defeated Catherine McKenney, a progressive councillor supported by many New Democratic Party and some Liberal figures. Sutcliffe drew support from sitting Liberal and Conservative politicians.

As mayor, Sutcliffe has emphasized affordability, housing, public safety, public transportation, and reducing government spending. His council budgets have generally passed with wide margins, a shift from the more contentious dynamics of previous terms.

Sutcliffe's first budget, in 2023, passed unanimously and kept property tax increases capped at 2.5% for 2023 and 2024, as he had pledged during the campaign. It also froze OC Transpo fares (though OC Transpo fares would increase in subsequent budgets), added $15 million to police funding, and increased funding for social service agencies. Subsequent budgets in 2025 and 2026 raised property taxes by 3.9% and 3.75%

Sutcliffe introduced a housing plan aimed at speeding up approvals, lowering development costs and fees, and encouraging urban intensification and transit-oriented development. In December 2025, Prime Minister Mark Carney and Sutcliffe announced a $400 million federal-municipal agreement to build up to 3,000 homes in Ottawa, including more than 1,000 units through the city's affordable housing pipeline. By April 2026, the city said this target had been surpassed, citing eight projects producing more than 1,100 affordable units. That same month, council unanimously passed a Sutcliffe-introduced motion to double the rate of supportive housing construction.

One major initiative started by Jim Watson and continued under Sutcliffe has been Lansdowne 2.0, a redevelopment of the City-owned Lansdowne Park. The project carries a total projected cost of $418.8 million, with the City claiming it's net share will be estimated at $130 million. It includes renovations to the north-side stands in TD Place Stadium, reconstruction of the 57-year-old TD Place Arena, a new event centre adjacent to the stadium, and two residential towers. It also includes $14.4 million for affordable housing. The project has drawn objections from The Ottawa Charge of the Professional Women's Hockey League, which stated it would not play at the renovated arena if seating capacity is reduced from 8,585 to 5,500, opting instead to play at the Canadian Tire Centre for the 2026–27 season.

The 2024 budget passed 20–5 and maintained the 2.5% property tax cap. It allocated $214 million for housing, $140 million for road and bridge repairs, $13.4 million police funding increase, and further spending on infrastructure, sidewalks, parks, and community safety.

In August 2024, Sutcliffe was among several organizations, including Ottawa hospitals, school boards, and the federal Liberal Party, that declined to participate in the city's pride parade, citing a statement from event organizers that characterized Israel's actions in the Gaza war as genocide. In 2025, after the organization removed that statement from its website, a group calling itself Queers for Palestine blockaded the parade, which was ultimately cancelled. Organizers said they had tried for over an hour to resolve the blockade and accused the group of negotiating in bad faith.

The 2025 budget passed 22–3 and funded transit, roads, sidewalks, and affordable housing, along with new hires, 50 police officers, 22 firefighters, 23 paramedics, and 10 bylaw officers. Fuel-cost savings identified by the city were redirected toward transit, park amenities, and food security organizations, including the Ottawa Food Bank.

In September 2025, Sutcliffe pledged to end youth homelessness by 2030, calling it a first step toward ending homelessness generally. Several homelessness-focused organizations, including the Alliance to End Homelessness, Operation Come Home, and Shepherds of Good Hope, expressed support for the goal.

The 2026 budget passed 21–4. It raised OC Transpo's budget by 10.5% to support increased LRT Line 1 frequency, and included a motion, proposed with councillor Shawn Menard, providing free weekend and holiday transit for riders 18 and under, plus up to four free Para Transpo rides monthly for eligible seniors. It also included the largest increase to the Ottawa Police Service budget in 15 years, funding 21 new sworn officers, four special constables, a new district policing model, and expanded body-worn camera use.

== Personal life ==
Mark and Ginny Sutcliffe were married in 2008. They have 3 children. Mark Sutcliffe is a long-distance runner and has written two books about his experiences: Why I Run and The Road to Boston.

== Electoral record ==
2026 Ottawa municipal election: Mayor
| Candidate | Popular vote | | | Expenditures |
| Candidate | Votes | % | ±% | Expenditures |
|---|---|---|---|---|
| Mark Sutcliffe (X) | 139,354 | 44.65 | -6.75 | |
| Jeff Leiper | 105,819 | 33.90 | – | |
| Neil Saravanamuttoo | 34,463 | 11.04 | – | |
| Alex Lawson | 23,605 | 7.56 | – | |
| Amjad Ali Syed | 1,312 | 0.42 | – | |
| Queen Divine Priya Amber Bakshi | 1,234 | 0.40 | – | |
| Ali Shayvard | 1,016 | 0.33 | – | |
| Bernard Couchman | 925 | 0.30 | +0.15 | |
| Peter Westaway | 912 | 0.29 | – | |
| Jacob Solomon | 858 | 0.27 | +0.13 | |
| Geoff Nicholas | 799 | 0.26 | – | |
| Suraj Harish | 728 | 0.23 | – | |
| Josh Rachlis | 688 | 0.22 | – | |
| Zed Chebib | 412 | 0.13 | +0.05 | |
| Total valid votes | 314,393 | | | |
| Total rejected, unmarked and declined votes | | | | |
| Turnout | | | | |
| Eligible voters | 868,248 | | | |
Note: Candidate campaign colours are based on the prominent colour used in campaign items (signs, literature, etc.) and are used as a visual differentiation between candidates.
Sources: City of Ottawa

2022 Ottawa municipal election: Mayor
| Candidate | Popular vote | | | Expenditures |
| Candidate | Votes | % | ±% | Expenditures |
|---|---|---|---|---|
| Mark Sutcliffe | 161,679 | 51.37 | – | $537,834.79 |
| Catherine McKenney | 119,241 | 37.88 | – | $542,847.97 |
| Bob Chiarelli | 15,998 | 5.08 | – | $96,844.84 |
| Nour Kadri | 7,496 | 2.38 | – | $71,062.45 |
| Mike Maguire | 2,775 | 0.88 | – | $5,500.00 |
| Graham MacDonald | 1,629 | 0.52 | – | $5,334.50 |
| Brandon Bay | 1,512 | 0.48 | – | $9,478.02 |
| Param Singh | 1,176 | 0.37 | – | $13,650.40 |
| Celine Debassige | 867 | 0.28 | – | none listed |
| Ade Olumide | 636 | 0.20 | – | $1,966.25 |
| Gregory Jreg Guevara | 584 | 0.19 | – | $2,349.61 |
| Bernard Couchman | 471 | 0.15 | -0.21 | none listed |
| Jacob Solomon | 432 | 0.14 | – | none listed |
| Zed Chebib | 264 | 0.08 | – | none listed |
| Total valid votes | 314,760 | 99.53 | | |
| Total rejected, unmarked and declined votes | 1,500 | 0.47 | -0.92 | |
| Turnout | 316,260 | 43.79 | +1.24 | |
| Eligible voters | 722,227 | | | |
Note: Candidate campaign colours are based on the prominent colour used in campaign items (signs, literature, etc.) and are used as a visual differentiation between candidates.
Sources: City of Ottawa
