= CKBY-FM =

Radio station in Smiths Falls, Ontario

Coordinates: 45°04′50″N 76°05′52″W

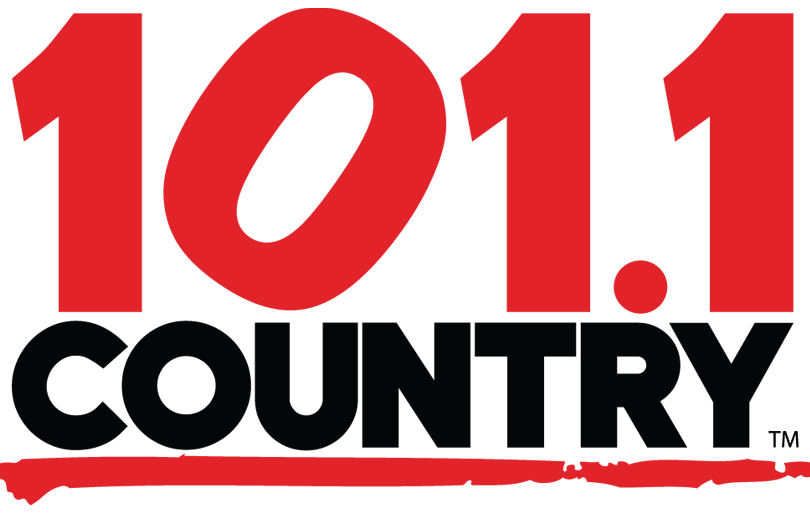
- Smiths Falls, Ontario; Canada
- Broadcast area: National Capital Region; Eastern Ontario; Western Quebec
- Frequency: 101.1 MHz
- Branding: Country 101.1

Programming
- Format: Country

Ownership
- Owner: Rogers Radio; (Rogers Media, Inc.)
- Sister stations: CHEZ-FM, CISS-FM

History
- First air date: January 20, 1969 (as CJET-FM)
- Former call signs: CJET-FM (1969-1970s, 2020-2023); CKUE-FM (1970s-1984); CHEQ-FM (1984–1993); CFMO-FM (1993–2000); CIOX-FM (2000–2004)

Technical information
- Class: C
- ERP: 100,000 watts
- HAAT: 141.5 meters (464 ft)

Links
- Webcast: Listen live
- Website: country1011.com

CKBY-FM (101.1 MHz, Country 101.1) is a commercial radio station licensed to Smiths Falls, Ontario, and serving the National Capital Region including Ottawa. It is owned by Rogers Radio, a division of Rogers Sports & Media. From 2020 to 2023 it was branded as CityNews 101.1 with the call letters CJET-FM which simulcasted a News/Talk format with co-owned CIWW. On October 26, 2023, the CityNews branding and simulcast was terminated, CIWW went silent, and 101.1 reverted to its former call letters and Country format, which had been at 92.3 FM.

CKBY-FM has radio studios in Smiths Falls (as part of its license agreement), with auxiliary studios at the Rogers Ottawa cluster on Thurston Drive and Conroy Road.

CKBY-FM has an effective radiated power (ERP) of 100,000 watts, the current maximum power for Canadian FM stations. The transmitter is on Ontario Highway 15 near Line Route 7 in Beckwith, Ontario.

== History ==
The station was launched at 101.1 MHz on January 20, 1969 as CJET-FM, a sister station to the AM radio station CJET. The station on 101.1 changed its callsign to CKUE-FM in the early 1970s.

In 1984, the stations were acquired by CHEZ-FM Inc., the owner of Ottawa's CHEZ. CKUE-FM changed its callsign to CHEQ-FM, the same year, and adopted the Q101 brand. Q101 switched from its longtime adult contemporary format to country music in 1990, but the country format was financially unsuccessful.

In 1993, CHEZ acquired rights to the callsign and format of CFMO-FM, an easy listening station in Ottawa which CHUM Limited had converted to hot adult contemporary CKKL-FM.

In 1999, the CHEZ group of stations were acquired by Rogers Media. On December 31 of that year, Rogers converted the station to a modern rock format and moved the station's studios into Ottawa, using the callsign CIOX-FM and the brand name Xfm. However, in 2001 the CRTC found that by operating CIOX as an Ottawa station, Rogers was in contravention of market concentration rules about the number of radio stations in a single market that can be owned by the same company. As a result, the CRTC ordered Rogers to return the station to Smiths Falls.

In October 2003, the station stunted for the day as 101.1 Frank FM, playing pretty much anything.

On January 9, 2004, at Noon, the station adopted its current format when Rogers converted the former CKBY in Ottawa to the current CISS-FM. 101.1 became CKBY-FM Y101, and 105.3 became CISS-FM a month later after the format change. On June 28, 2013, the station was rebranded as Country 101.1 as part of a standardization of Rogers' country stations.

logo for AM/FM simulcast

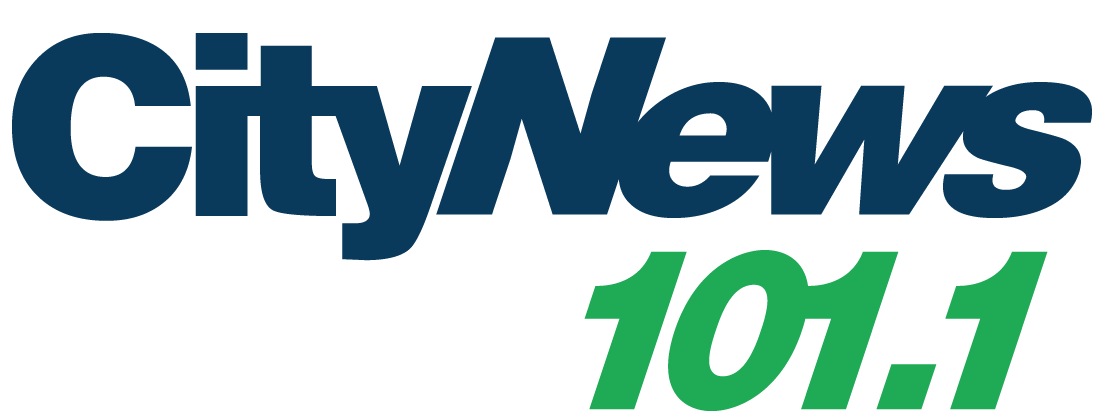
alternate logo

On December 3, 2020, as part of a larger realignment of Rogers' Ottawa stations, the station flipped to news/talk as an FM simulcast of CIWW, with both stations also rebranded as CityNews Ottawa. The country format moved to sister station CJET-FM 92.3, with the stations also swapping call signs. This realignment was reversed on October 26, 2023, with CKBY-FM moving back to 101.1 and the CityNews format being discontinued.

== All-news programming ==
During its CityNews period, on weekdays, local all-news blocks were heard in morning and afternoon drive time. In middays, two local talk shows air: Rob Snow in late mornings and Sam Laprade in early afternoons. Their shows were repeated in the evening. Overnights featured the national all-news service shared with CFTR Toronto, CFFR Calgary and CKWX Vancouver.

On weekends, all-news blocks were heard in the morning and overnight, with talk shows in the afternoon and CBS Sports Radio in the evening. ABC News Radio supplies reports on world and U.S. news. Toronto Blue Jays baseball games were carried. The Blue Jays, CKBY-FM and CIWW are all co-owned by Rogers Communications.

== Notes ==
On June 30, 2025, My Broadcasting Corporation acquired CKBY-FM's sister station, CJET-FM Smiths Falls.
