= An American in Canada =

- Created by: Howard Busgang; Jebb Fink
- Starring: Rick Roberts; Hélène Joy; Stewart Francis; Timm Zemanek; Matthew Ferguson; Robin Brûlé
- Country of origin: Canada
- No. of seasons: 2
- No. of episodes: 16

Production
- Running time: approx. 30 minutes

Original release
- Network: CBC
- Release: February 28, 2003 – January 30, 2004

An American in Canada is a Canadian television sitcom that aired on CBC Television in 2003 and 2004.

The show starred Rick Roberts as Jake Crewe, an American television news host who was forced, after beating up his station manager, to accept a job in Calgary, Alberta as co-host of the lowest-rated morning news program in the city. The show found its comedy in Crewe's attempts to adapt to Canadian culture, as well as his interactions with coworkers such as producer and love interest Judy Surgick (Hélène Joy) and egotistical host Dennis McIlvane (Stewart Francis).

An American in Canada was loosely based on the real-life experiences of Jebb Fink, an American comedian who moved to Canada after marrying a Canadian woman, and did become a morning television host on CKAL-TV, Calgary's A-Channel station. It was created by Fink and Howard Busgang.

The show's pilot aired as a special in January 2002 as part of the CBC's early-2000s strategy of airing comedy pilots to test viewer reaction before ordering the production of a full series. Viewer reaction was overwhelmingly positive, and the series went into production and premiered in 2003. The show produced 16 episodes over two seasons before being cancelled in 2004.

The program won the Gemini Award for Best Comedy Program or Series at the 17th Gemini Awards.

It has also aired on Australia's The Comedy Channel with the title Frostbite, and in syndication on Showcase in Canada and HDNet in the USA.

== Cast ==
- Rick Roberts - Jake Crewe
- Hélène Joy - Judy Surgick
- Stewart Francis - Dennis Macilvane
- Timm Zemanek - Bill Robinson
- Matthew Ferguson - Derrick
- Robin Brûlé - Mara
- Sugith Varughese - Aftab

== Episode list ==
=== Season 1 ===
#	Airdate	Prod. Code	Title
1 1 - 1	February 28, 2003	101	The Bare Naked Lady
2 1 - 2	March 7, 2003	102	The Order of Canada
3 1 - 3	March 14, 2003	103	Dirty Kwebeck
4 1 - 4	March 28, 2003	104	Call Me Dr. Ken
5 1 - 5	April 4, 2003	105	True North Strong and Almost Free
6 1 - 6	April 4, 2003	106	To the Good Ol' USA

=== Season 2 ===
#	Airdate	Prod. Code	Title
7 2 - 1	October 24, 2003	201	A Kiss is Just a Kiss
8 2 - 2	October 31, 2003	202	Jake and the Fat Men
9 2 - 3	November 7, 2003	203	Love Notes From the Edge
10 2 - 4	November 21, 2003	204	Citizen Jake
11 2 - 5	November 28, 2003		Some Like It Hot Zone
12 2 - 6	December 5, 2003		Play Misty For Me
13 2 - 7	January 9, 2004		Dennis Anyone?
14 2 - 8	January 16, 2004		Frisky Business
15 2 - 9	January 23, 2004		A Non-Date to Remember
16 2 - 10	January 30, 2004		I Dream of Judy
