= CIWW =

Radio station in Ottawa (1922–2023)

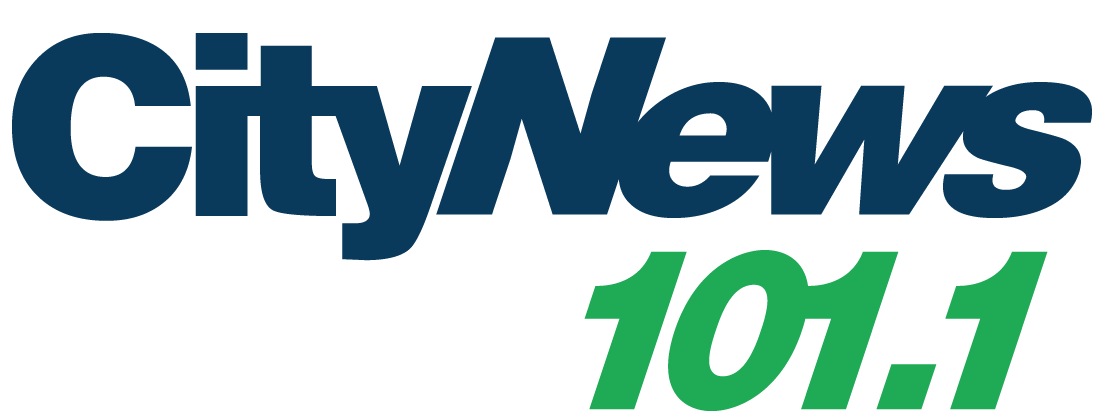
- Ottawa, Ontario; Canada
- Broadcast area: National Capital Region, Eastern Ontario, Western Quebec
- Frequency: 1310 kHz
- Branding: CityNews 101.1

Programming
- Format: News/talk
- Affiliations: ABC News Radio, Toronto Blue Jays Radio Network, CBS Sports Radio

Ownership
- Owner: Rogers Radio; (Rogers Media, Inc.)

History
- First air date: 1922
- Last air date: October 26, 2023
- Former call signs: CKCO (1922–1949); CKOY (1949–1985)
- Former frequencies: 400 m (1922–1925); 690 kHz (1925–1929); 840 kHz (1927); 890 kHz (1929–1933); 1010 kHz (1933–1941)

Technical information
- Class: B
- Power: 50,000 watts
- Transmitter coordinates: 45°15′27.1″N 75°47′3.2″W

CIWW (1310 AM) was a radio station in Ottawa, Ontario owned by Rogers Radio. The station was the oldest radio station in Ottawa, first signing on in 1922. The station broadcast at 50,000 watts, the maximum for Canadian AM stations. The transmitter site was on McKenna Casey Drive, near Strandherd Drive and Ontario Highway 416 in Nepean. To protect other stations on 1310 AM, it used a directional antenna. By day it employed a two-tower array and at night a five-tower array. The nighttime signal was beamed mainly into Canada. The towers were removed sometime in late 2023.

In 2020, the station added an FM simulcast on CJET-FM. On October 26, 2023, the station was closed by Rogers after just over 100 years of operation.

== History ==
=== CKCO and CKOY ===
CIWW was Ottawa's oldest station and one of the first in Canada. Dr. George Geldert launched the station in 1922. Its original call sign was CKCO. The use of the callsign CKCO was not related to CKCO-TV in Kitchener, which signed on decades later.

In its early years, CKCO changed frequencies a number of times, as most early AM radio stations in North America did. With the adoption of the North American Regional Broadcasting Agreement (NARBA), the station moved to 1310 kc. in 1941. In 1945, CKCO became Ottawa's affiliate of the Canadian Broadcasting Corporation's Dominion Network until the network dissolved in 1962.

In 1949, the station was purchased by Southam, a newspaper and broadcasting company. The callsign changed to CKOY.

Logo as "Oldies 1310", c. 1992–2010

=== CIWW Oldies ===
In 1972, sister station CKBY-FM was launched. In 1978, after two failed attempts to sell the stations to Moffat Communications, the Canadian Radio-television and Telecommunications Commission (CRTC) approved their sale to Maclean-Hunter.

The station adopted the call sign CIWW in 1985, switching to an Oldies format. The playlist was mostly music of the late 1950s to early 1970s. The name used over the air was W1310, followed by Sunny 1310. In 1992, the station changed to the branding of Oldies 1310.

=== All-News Radio ===
In 1994, the stations became part of Rogers Radio when Rogers acquired Maclean-Hunter.

First logo as 1310 News

Second and final logo as 1310 News

On October 12, 2010, the station announced it would be adopting an all-news format, to be branded 1310 News, taking effect the following Monday, October 18, at 6:00 a.m. CIWW is the fourth Rogers station to adopt a 24-hour all-news format after CFTR Toronto, CKWX Vancouver, and CFFR Calgary. The company also owns four other stations that combine the all-news format (during morning and afternoon drive) with talk programming.

The final song played on the station in its oldies format, at 5:55 a.m. on October 18, 2010, was "Life Is a Rock (But the Radio Rolled Me)", a song which rapidly recounts radio from the 1950s, '60s & '70s. This was followed at 5:58 a.m. by an announcement that the format change was taking effect.

=== Adding sports ===
Rogers announced on November 5, 2013 that CIWW would begin carrying Sportsnet Radio programing from Toronto sister station CJCL for the bulk of its schedule. The station continues its all-news format during drive time hours. It also introduced a local late-morning general-interest talk show, Talk to the Hand, hosted by Ed Hand. The move was concurrent with layoffs at Rogers.

On November 24, 2014, CIWW made a slight change to their schedule, which included morning news beginning a half-hour earlier at 5:00 a.m., Talk to the Hand was renamed to The Ed Hand Show and began airing for three hours, from 10 a.m.–1 p.m. Afternoon news, hosted by Mark Day and Lisa Best, now began and ended an hour earlier, starting at 2 p.m. and ending at 7 p.m. Prime Time Sports ran in the evening.

=== Adding more talk ===
On March 18, 2016, the station named Mark Sutcliffe, a long-time Ottawa broadcaster and future mayor, as host of Ottawa Today, airing weekdays from 9 a.m. to 1 p.m, and repeated every weekend from 8 a.m.

On May 10, 2016, it was announced that former CTV Ottawa news anchor Carol Anne Meehan would be hosting The Carol Anne Meehan Show, which aired from 1 to 3 p.m. The show was later replaced by The Rick Gibbons Show in November 27, 2017.

On September 16, 2016, afternoon newscasts started beginning at 3 p.m.

logo after AM/FM simulcast

On December 3, 2020, at 10:00 a.m., CIWW rebranded as CityNews, and began simulcasting on sister station CJET-FM (101.1) while continuing to broadcast on 1310. The FM signal was strongest to the south and west of Ottawa, while the AM signal continued to cover Ottawa's eastern suburbs that may not have picked up the FM station.

=== Closure ===
On October 26, 2023, at 1:00 p.m., CIWW was shut down by Rogers, and the all-news format was concurrently discontinued. After 101 years of service to the Ottawa area and transmitting at 1310 kHz since 1941, the CIWW 1310 AM transmitter was turned off the following day on October 27, 2023 at 9:00 AM, after airing a final announcement:

You're listening to 1310 AM, the former home of CityNews Ottawa.

Despite the best efforts of the talented and committed team who provided local news and engaging talk radio to Ottawa and the region dependably day after day, the station has now sadly closed.

This was an incredibly difficult decision and one we hoped we'd not have to make.

To the team that contributed so passionately to the station, thank you.

To each of you who showed us your support by tuning in day after day, thank you.

To each local business that trusted us to help market your products and services, thank you.

If you're seeking local news, traffic and weather, you can find that 24-7 at ottawa.citynews.ca.

Ottawa, thank you. (AM static)

CJET-FM returned to its former country format on 101.1 FM when the callsign was changed to CKBY-FM, while 92.3 became CJET-FM which briefly simulcast CKBY-FM, stunting Christmas music on November 1, then back to its Jack FM format on December 27, 2023. On November 28, 2023, CIWW's license was returned to the CRTC by Rogers.

== Programming ==
As CityNews, local all-news blocks were heard from 5 to 6 AM weekdays, and also during All News Afternoons drive times. The station's morning show, Wake Up With Rob Snow, featured talk programming from 6 to 9 AM hosted by Rob Snow and produced by David Smith and Noah Wachter. In mid-days, two local talk shows aired: The Talkback Hour with David Smith in late mornings and The Sam Laprade Show in early afternoons. The Sam Laprade Show was rebroadcast during evenings. Overnights featured syndicated sports content from CBS Sports shared with CFTR Toronto and CKWX Vancouver.

On weekends, all-news blocks were heard in the mornings and overnights, with Best Of talk show segments airing in the afternoons and CBS Sports Radio in the evenings. ABC News Radio supplies reports on world and U.S. news. The station was also the Ottawa affiliate of the Toronto Blue Jays Radio Network.

== Former broadcasters ==
- Mark Day (actor), afternoon news anchor, talk show host and actor.
- Ken Grant "The General" Morning show host until retirement in 2001
- Bob Derro "Brother Bob" Morning show host from 2001 until 2010, when the radio station changed formats
- Rob Snow, host of The Rob Snow Show and Wake Up with Rob Snow.
- Bryan Fustukian, broadcasting as Vik Armen.
- Rick Gibbons, host of the Rick Gibbons Show.
- Mark Sutcliffe, host of Ottawa Today; became 59th Mayor of Ottawa in 2022
- Victoria Williston and Andrew Boyle, morning news anchors, from 2018 - 2021/2023 respectively.
