= CFFR =

Radio station in Calgary (1984–2026

- Final CFFR logo from 2025 to 2026.
- Calgary, Alberta; Canada
- Broadcast area: Calgary Metropolitan Region; Southern Alberta
- Frequency: 660 kHz
- Branding: 660 NewsRadio Calgary

Programming
- Format: All-news radio
- Affiliations: CityNews; CKAL-DT; The Canadian Press; ABC News Radio; Associated Press; Bloomberg Radio

Ownership
- Owner: Rogers Radio; (Rogers Media, Inc.)
- Sister stations: CFAC, CHFM-FM, CJAQ-FM, CJCO-DT, CKAL-DT

History
- First air date: January 10, 1984
- Last air date: July 7, 2026 (42 years, 178 days)
- Call sign meaning: Calgary's Finest Family Radio

Technical information
- Licensing authority: CRTC
- Class: B
- Power: 50,000 watts
- Transmitter coordinates: 50°45′27″N 114°03′46″W

Links
- Webcast: Listen live
- Website: calgary.citynews.ca

CFFR (660 AM) was a commercial all-news radio station in Calgary, Alberta, Canada. It was owned by Rogers Radio a division of Rogers Sports & Media, and branded as 660 NewsRadio Calgary. The studios were on 7th Avenue Southwest in downtown Calgary.

CFFR was a Class B station. It was powered at 50,000 watts, the maximum for Canadian AM stations. AM 660 was an American clear channel frequency, so CFFR used a directional antenna with a three-tower array to protect other stations from interference. Its transmitter was off 48th Street West in Okotoks.

== History ==
=== Gold-based AC ===
CFFR signed on the air on January 10, 1984. It was owned by Rawlco Communications, Ltd. The station started out with a gold-based adult contemporary format known as 66 CFR. "CFR" initially stood for "Calgary Family Radio" with the additional "F" in the call sign being incidental. Later, the CFFR call letters were used for "Calgary Flames Radio", representing the NHL hockey team in town. (Game coverage moved to sister station CFAC 960 AM upon its relaunch as all-sports.)

The first song played on CFFR was "A Hard Day's Night" by the Beatles. Earlier that week, the station stunted with the sound of a clock ticking. CFFR's announcements used the same early 1980's jingles as CFTR in Toronto. Various number 1 songs from 1964 to 1983 were heard. Hard Day's Night was an ode to all the work that the staff had done to get the station up and running.

During its early years, "66 CFR" played hits from the late 1950s to the 1980s. The last song played in the music format was "We Built This City" by Starship. The announcement of 66 CFR leaving the air was accompanied by the closing chord of the Beatles' "A Day in the Life", which had also been the first sound heard at the start of the production piece introducing the station.

=== All-news ===
As of April 3, 2006, CFFR was airing an all-news format, branded as 660 NewsRadio Calgary. It was one of several radio stations owned by Rogers with a news or news/talk format. As of winter 2020, CFFR was the 11th-most-listened-to radio station in the Calgary market according to a PPM data report released by Numeris.

In June 2021, Rogers announced that it would rebrand CFFR and its other all-news and news/talk radio stations under the CityNews brand. The new moniker began on October 18, 2021. The radio station's website was co-branded with CityNews and included reporting from Citytv Calgary's newscasts.

In July 2024, the station rebranded as 660 NewsRadio Calgary, along with Rogers' other news radio stations across Canada. Local anchors delivered the news during the day and evenings. Late nights, CFFR joined with CFTR Toronto, CKWX Vancouver and CJNI-FM Halifax in airing a national all-news radio service.

=== Closure ===
On July 7, 2026, Rogers announced that CFFR had shut down as one of six radio station closures in various locations across the country, with the licence being returned to the CRTC.

== Past station logos ==
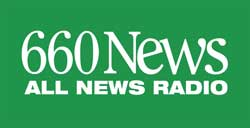

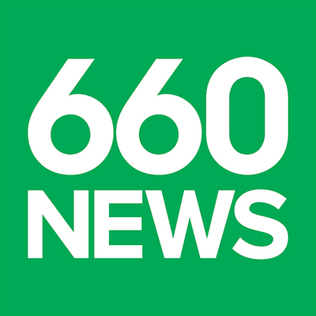

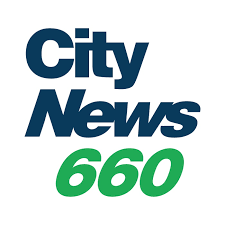
