= Ottawa Business Journal =

- Owner(s): Great River Media
- Founder(s): Mark Sutcliffe
- Publisher: Michael Curran
- Editor-in-chief: Anne Howland
- Founded: 1995
- Language: English
- City: Ottawa, ON
- Website: obj.ca

The Ottawa Business Journal (OBJ) is a regional business publication serving Canada's National Capital Region. In addition to a digital website, obj.ca, Ottawa Business Journal boasts a quarterly newspaper with a circulation of 10,000 copies, specialty magazines and regular podcasts. Founded in 1995, it is owned by Great River Media

== History ==
The Ottawa Business Journal was founded in 1995 by Mark Sutcliffe. Until Recently it was owned by Transcontinental Inc. On August 18, 2010, Michael Curran (publisher of OBJ since 2002), Mark Sutcliffe (Ottawa Citizen columnist, radio host at CIWW and a co-founder of OBJ), and Donna Neil (a former OBJ manager) took over ownership.

== Site statistics ==
On April 17, 2013, Alexa.com had ranked Ottawabusinessjournal.com as the 6,775th visited site in Canada. On October 30, 2015, Alexa.com ranked Ottawabusinessjournal.com as the 14,707th visited site in Canada.

== New platform ==
On December 14, 2009, the Ottawa Business Journal moved its website to Transcontinental's United Newspaper Information System (UNIS) platform. The old archives, message boards and polls could not be immediately transferred and as a result are no longer available to the public.
