= CKNT =

Radio station in Mississauga, Ontario

- Mississauga, Ontario; Canada
- Broadcast area: Greater Toronto Area
- Frequency: 960 kHz
- Branding: Sauga 960 AM

Programming
- Format: News/talk
- Affiliations: Mississauga Steelheads, Raptors 905, York United FC

Ownership
- Owner: 8159203 Canada Limited (Elliott Kerr)

History
- First air date: September 4, 2018
- Call sign meaning: Elliott Kerr, News/Talk

Technical information
- Class: B
- Power: 1,250 watts day; 175 watts night
- Transmitter coordinates: 43.648333°N 79.682222°W

Links
- Website: sauga960am.ca

CKNT (960 AM), branded as Sauga 960 AM, is a commercial radio station licensed to Mississauga, Ontario, Canada and serving Greater Toronto. It is owned by 8159203 Canada Ltd., headed by Elliott Kerr, and broadcasts a news/talk radio format. The radio studios and offices are on Westmore Drive in Etobicoke.

By day, CKNT is powered at 1,250 watts. However, to avoid interference to other stations on 960 AM, it reduces power to 175 watts at night. It uses a non-directional antenna. The transmitter is on Courtneypark Drive East, near Kennedy Road South in Mississauga.

== History ==
Elliot Kerr, owner of the Mississauga Steelheads, an Ontario Hockey League team, received approval by the Canadian Radio-television and Telecommunications Commission (CRTC) on November 22, 2011, to operate a new English-language news/talk AM radio station in Mississauga. In his application, Kerr stated that the station would air 101 hours of local news and talk content per week. The station was assigned a frequency of 960 kHz which was previously used by a radio station in Cambridge, Ontario, which migrated to the FM band as CIZN-FM (now CJDV-FM).

CKNT planned to begin broadcasting in 2012, but Kerr had difficulty in finding a site for the station's transmitter tower. This delayed the launch of the station. The CRTC approved applications to decrease the daytime transmitter power from 2,000 to 700 watts, decrease the nighttime transmitter power from 180 to 104 watts, and relocate the transmitter in 2014. A renewal was granted on the license for the yet to be launched station in 2018.

Kerr announced on August 31, 2018, that the station would soft launch on September 4. The station had been stunting for several months prior with filler music. The station officially signed on with its full programming schedule on October 29, 2018.

== Programming ==
The station's schedule includes Mike Richards, who became the station's morning drive host along with David Bastl on January 7, 2019; The Marc Patrone Show, a politics and business program hosted by former CRTC commissioner and former Sun News Network and Rebel News contributor Marc Patrone; David Wojcik hosting a business show; Media Nation with former CTV News reporter Karlene Nation; The Norm with Norm Murray, among other programs.

Among the original line-up were Mike Bullard with comedian Lawrence Morganstern in morning drive time. Comedians Glen Foster and Jodie Decker hosted Foster & Decker on weekday afternoons.

=== Live sportscasts ===
- Canadian Elite Basketball League
- Canadian Football League: Hamilton Tiger-Cats
- Canadian Premier League: York United FC; featuring Eoin O'Callaghan as the host & play-by-play voice.
- NBA G-League: Raptors 905, featuring Matt Cullen as play-by-play voice & Jevohn Shepherd as analyst during home games
- Ontario Hockey League: Brampton Steelheads

(formerly Mississauga Steelheads); featuring Matt Cullen as play-by-play voice; the team is also owned by Sauga 960 owner Elliot Kerr and "Sauga" was the name of the team's mascot
