= Mike Richards (broadcaster) =

Canadian radio broadcaster

Mike Richards (born Mike Rehill 1963 or 1964 in Stouffville, Ontario) is a Canadian radio broadcaster with a long history in sports radio. Previously associated with The Fan 590 in Toronto and The Fan 960 in Calgary, he was announced in January 2011 as the first major personality hired for TSN Radio 1050 and the national TSN Radio network, where he was a morning host. Richards left TSN Radio in 2016.

Since 2017, Richards has hosted The Raw Mike Richards Show daily podcast.

Richards joined Sauga 960 AM in Mississauga as the station's morning host beginning January 7, 2019.
