= Jebb Fink =

American-Canadian comedian

Jebb Finnk
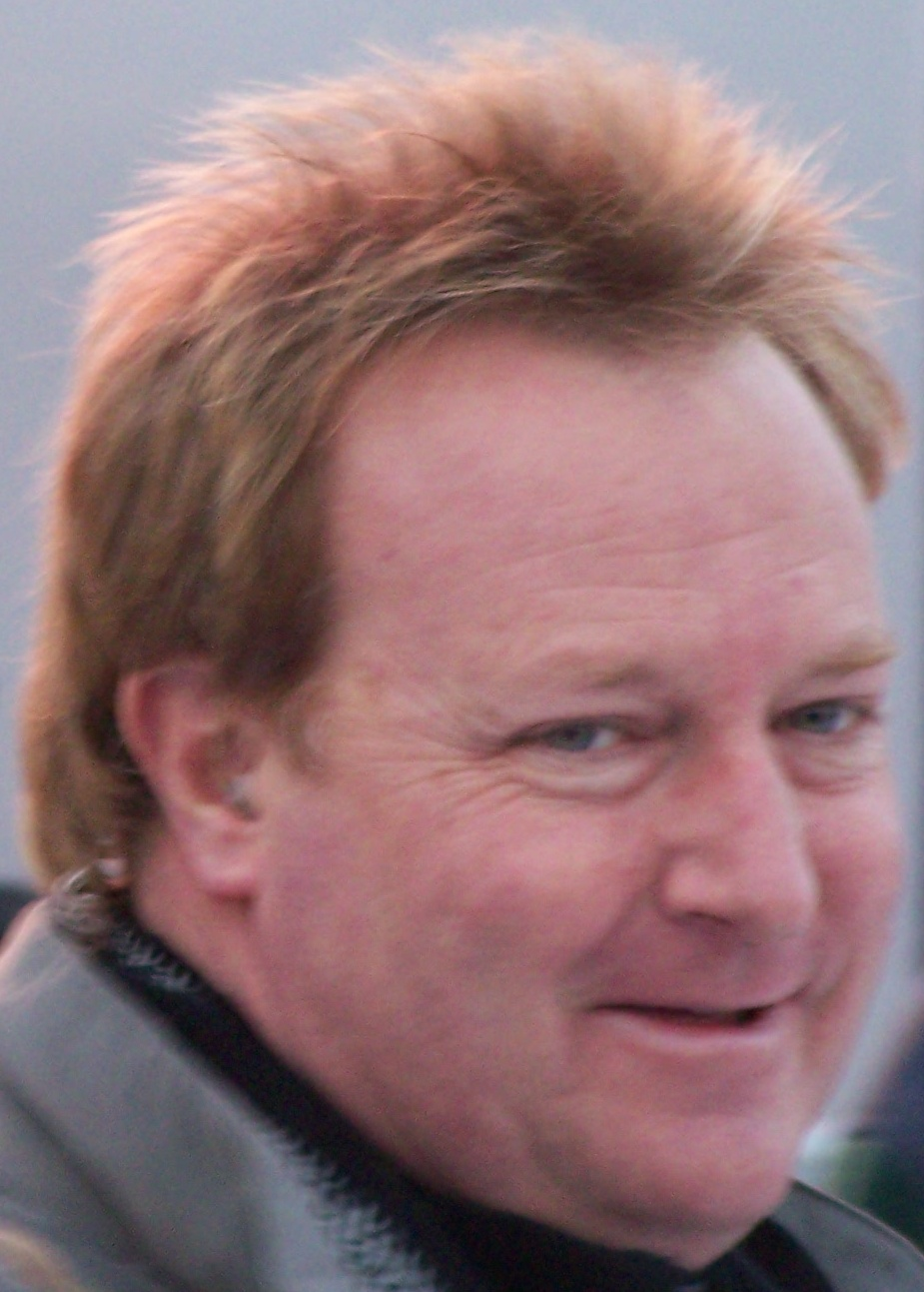
- Born: Los Angeles, California
- Citizenship: Canadian
- Occupations: Reporter, host, stand-up comedian
- Known for: Hosting "The Big Breakfast" on A-Channel Calgary, Sitcom An American in Canada

Jebb Fink is an American-Canadian stand-up comedian and television personality, known as a reporter and host for The Big Breakfast on A-Channel Calgary. He won a Gemini as co-creator of the CBC comedy An American in Canada and was a weather presenter on Your City for Citytv Calgary, he also hosted the short-lived late night talk show Global Late Night for the Global Television Network in 2004.

Born and raised in Los Angeles, California, Fink moved to Canada in adulthood after marrying a woman from Edmonton, Alberta. Jebb and his wife moved to Calgary in 1990. His comedy, which is largely based on exploring cultural differences between Canada and the United States, also inspired the CBC Television sitcom An American in Canada.
