= CISS-FM =

Radio station in Ottawa

Coordinates: 45°22′42.3″N 75°37′32.8″W

- Ottawa, Ontario; Canada
- Broadcast area: National Capital Region; Eastern Ontario; Western Quebec
- Frequency: 105.3 MHz
- Branding: KiSS 105.3

Programming
- Format: Hot adult contemporary

Ownership
- Owner: Rogers Radio; (Rogers Media, Inc.)
- Sister stations: CHEZ-FM, CKBY-FM

History
- First air date: 1972
- Former call signs: CKBY (1972–2004)
- Call sign meaning: Sounds like "kiss"

Technical information
- Licensing authority: CRTC
- Class: C1
- ERP: 84,000 watts
- HAAT: 323 metres (1,060 ft)

Links
- Website: kissottawa.com

CISS-FM (105.3 FM) is a commercial radio station in Ottawa, Ontario, Canada. The station is owned by Rogers Radio, a division of Rogers Sports & Media, and broadcasts a hot adult contemporary format branded on-air as KiSS 105.3. The studios are located at Thurston Drive and Conroy Road.

CISS-FM's transmitter is located in Camp Fortune, Quebec, within Gatineau Park.

== History ==
The station signed on the air in 1972 with the call sign CKBY, playing a country format.

On January 9, 2004, the station shifted to a hot adult contemporary format and adopted the 105.3 KISS-FM moniker. The station launched with Pink's "Get the Party Started". A month after the format change, the station adopted its current call letters. The CISS call sign was previously associated with a Toronto radio station, also owned by Rogers, which now uses the call letters CKIS-FM. The CKBY calls were subsequently transferred to a third Rogers station in Smiths Falls. In the station's early years, the station's playlist resembled that of CHUM-FM in Toronto, but with a less rhythmic lean. Later that year, it shifted from Hot AC to adult top 40.

The introduction of CISS came at the expense of 101.1 XFM (CIOX-FM), an alternative rock station that was shut down to make way for KISS and the relocation of country radio 105.3 FM as Y105, to 101.1 FM as Y101, which later rebranded as Country 101.1. The two morning show hosts of XFM, Mauler and Rush, were temporarily left unemployed. They have since moved to The Morning Hot Tub on CIHT-FM, which is also simulcast on other Stingray Group stations across Canada.

With the transition of the former CISS in Toronto from "Jack FM" to top 40 as KiSS 92.5 on June 5, 2009, the CISS calls remained unchanged on this station. Instead, Rogers swapped the CJAQ-FM calls in Toronto with the former CKIS-FM (a "Jack" station) in Calgary.

As of the fall of 2009, CISS has begun leaning towards a more rhythmic sound again, dropping most modern adult contemporary artists.

As of 2011, the station eliminated the majority of its pre-1999 playlist, shifting towards a more 2000s-now direction.

A new logo and tagline were introduced. The tagline was "The New" in its "KISS-FM" branding. The station leans on rhythmic material during nights and weekends. As of March 31, 2014, CISS faced additional competition from CKQB, which transitioned from active rock to a Top 40/CHR format. CKQB's presentation heavily favours current rhythmic and dance products aimed at young adult and teen listeners. CISS is on the Canadian Hot AC panels of Mediabase and Nielsen BDS.

By early 2016, CISS re-branded slightly to KiSS 105.3.

In September 2016, CISS re-added 1990s music to their playlist and changed the slogan to "The Most Variety from the 90s to Now."

In August 2021, CISS re-branded as "The Capital's KiSS 105.3", and changed their slogan to "90's, 2000's, Now!"

On June 30, 2025, My Broadcasting Corporation acquired CISS-FM's sister station, CJET-FM Smiths Falls.
