= CHEZ-FM =

Radio station in Ottawa

Coordinates: 45°22′42.3″N 75°37′32.8″W

- Ottawa, Ontario; Canada
- Broadcast area: National Capital Region, Eastern Ontario, Western Quebec
- Frequency: 106.1 MHz
- Branding: CHEZ 106

Programming
- Format: Mainstream rock

Ownership
- Owner: Rogers Radio; (Rogers Media, Inc.)
- Sister stations: CISS-FM, CKBY-FM

History
- First air date: March 25, 1977
- Call sign meaning: from a French word meaning "at the home of"

Technical information
- Class: C1
- ERP: 100,000 watts
- HAAT: 291 metres (955 ft)

Links
- Webcast: Listen Live
- Website: chez106.com

CHEZ-FM (106.1 MHz, CHEZ 106) is a Canadian radio station broadcasting a mainstream rock format in Ottawa, Ontario. The station is owned by Rogers Radio, a division of Rogers Sports & Media. CHEZ's studios are located at the intersection of Thurston Drive and Conroy Road in Ottawa, while its transmitter is located in Camp Fortune, Quebec, within Gatineau Park.

== History ==
CHEZ was launched at 6 p.m. on March 25, 1977 by CHEZ-FM Inc., a company owned and operated by Harvey Glatt. Glatt owned Treble Clef music stores, a chain of retail record stores, and was also a major local concert promoter.

The initial signal strength was 100,000 watts, and the first song was "Isn't She Lovely" by Stevie Wonder. The original morning show host was Mike O'Reilly, better known at the time as frontman in the rock group Bolt Upright and the Erections. Other early DJs included Geoff Winter, Steve Colwill, Sheryl Nicholson, Brian Murphy, Pierre Bourque, Paul Hunks, and Kathy Donovan. Ken Rockburn provided news and Randy Burgess did sports.

The station focused on the 18-34-year-old demographic by playing English progressive rock music. CHEZ also ran children's programming, talk programming and even some French programming when it first launched on air. Shows like CHEZ Ottawa, The Source, Jazz 106, Medium Rare and In the City distinguished the station from others in the Ottawa market.

During the first few years on air, CHEZ competed with AM station CFRA, then a pop-leaning music station. In 1987, just a few weeks before celebrating its tenth anniversary on the air, CHEZ attained the number one position in the Ottawa market for the first time, with nearly 300,000 weekly listeners.

CHEZ had two sister stations, CHEQ and CJET, under the umbrella of Rideau Broadcasting, located in Smiths Falls.

In 1994, CHEZ shifted to classic rock, partly due competing station CJSB moving its mainstream rock format to FM.

The station and its holdings (Rideau Broadcasting), Canada's last major independent radio station, was sold to Rogers Radio in 1999, joining CKBY and CIWW as Rogers-owned stations in the Ottawa market.

In 2011, CHEZ changed their slogan to "World Class Rock", and began adding more current rock music to its playlist, shifting towards a mainstream rock format. In March 2014, their slogan was changed again to "Ottawa's Rock Station" reflecting their competitor CKQB switching from active rock to a Top 40/CHR format.

On June 6, 2016, CHEZ was rebranded to 106.1 CHEZ with a new logo and the station's new website was launched reflecting the change.

In June 2019, CHEZ announced a new morning show, The Biggs and Barr Show, which formerly aired on CHTZ in St. Catharines.

In May 2020, the station reverted to its old branding of CHEZ 106, but kept the same logo and format. In 2025, the logo was updated to a guitar pick logo that is currently being used on most Rogers-owned rock radio stations.

On June 30, 2025, My Broadcasting Corporation acquired CHEZ-FM's sister station, CJET-FM Smiths Falls.

== Former logos ==
Logo used from 2016 to 2025
