= CISL (AM) =

Radio station in Vancouver, Canada (1980–2026)

- Final CISL logo from 2017 to 2026.
- Richmond, British Columbia; Canada
- Broadcast area: Greater Vancouver
- Frequency: 650 kHz
- Branding: Sportsnet 650

Programming
- Format: Sports
- Affiliations: Sportsnet Radio; Vancouver Canucks Radio Network; Vancouver Giants Radio Network; Abbotsford Canucks Radio Network; Toronto Blue Jays Radio Network; Seattle Mariners Radio Network; Westwood One Sports

Ownership
- Owner: Rogers Radio; (Rogers Media, Inc.)
- Sister stations: CJAX-FM, CKKS-FM, CKWX, CHNM-DT, CKVU-DT, Sportsnet Pacific

History
- First air date: May 1, 1980
- Last air date: July 7, 2026
- Former frequencies: 940 kHz (1980–1985)
- Call sign meaning: "Island" (reference to Lulu Island)

Technical information
- Class: B
- Power: 20,000 watts day; 4,000 watts night
- Transmitter coordinates: 49.16638889°N 123.01638889°W
- Repeater: 96.9 CJAX-FM HD3 (Vancouver)

Links
- Webcast: Listen Live
- Website: sportsnet.ca/650

CISL (650 kHz) was a commercial AM radio station licensed to Richmond, British Columbia, Canada that served the Greater Vancouver radio market. It was owned by Rogers Radio, a division of Rogers Sports & Media, and aired a sports format branded as Sportsnet 650. It was the flagship station of the Vancouver Giants, Vancouver Canucks and Abbotsford Canucks, and was the Vancouver affiliate of the Toronto Blue Jays, Seattle Seahawks and Seattle Mariners. On weekdays, local hosts were heard most of the day, while Westwood One Sports was heard late nights and weekends.

CISL's radio studios were located at 2440 Ash Street in the Fairview neighborhood of Vancouver. By day, CISL was powered at 20,000 watts; to avoid interference at night to other stations on 650 AM, it reduced power to 4,000 watts. CISL used a directional antenna at all times with a three-tower array. The transmitter was on Nelson Road off British Columbia Highway 91 on Lulu Island.

== History ==
=== 940 AM ===
CISL originally signed on the air on May 1, 1980, at a frequency of 940 kHz and a power of 2,500 watts. The call letters were pronounced "C-Isle". The license was granted to South Fraser Broadcasting, a group controlled by Michael Dickinson. Dickinson's previous broadcast experience included a stint at Vancouver radio stations CHQM-AM-FM.

The original music content was primarily middle of the road songs, branded as AM Gold Music Radio. The playlist consisted of titles released from 1955 to the-then present with the newscasters and announcers placing an emphasis on the community of Richmond (the ISLand in CISL).

=== Move to 650 AM ===
About 1985, the frequency was changed to 650 kHz (CFML's former frequency) and the daytime power increased to 10,000 watts, still at the same Richmond transmitter site. The antenna tower array was changed from four to three towers).

On December 27, 1988, CISL shifted to a full-time oldies format, with its playlist featuring music from 1955 to 1975. The new format helped CISL become a major player in the Vancouver radio scene. The original Richmond community programming expanded to include all of the Lower Mainland. CISL enjoyed its greatest ratings and sales success from 1986 to 1989. In 1990, South Fraser Broadcasting was issued an FM license, which went on the air as CKZZ-FM the following year. CISL and CKZZ were sold to Standard Broadcasting in May 1996.

In September 2007, CISL stopped using the Oldies 650 CISL name and rebranded as SuperHits 650 CISL. The format remained similar. On October 29, 2007, CISL, along with the rest of the Standard Broadcasting stations, were sold to Astral Media.

=== Soft AC era ===
On November 10, 2008, at 9 a.m., after playing "Kiss and Say Goodbye" by The Manhattans, CISL flipped from oldies to soft adult contemporary. The classic hits/oldies format moved to Rogers-owned CKKS-FM in September (that station later moved to a modern rock format). The move was a result of Jim Pattison Group flipping CKBD from its adult standards format to an adult album alternative (AAA) format and switching to FM on November 13. The first song on "All Time Favourites" was "We've Only Just Begun" by The Carpenters.

On December 23, 2009, CISL filed an application with the Canadian Radio-television and Telecommunications Commission (CRTC) requesting permission to broadcast up to 20% of its programming in Russian during the 2010 Winter Olympics. The programming was to be supplied by Moscow radio station AvtoRadio. This application received approval on January 26, 2010.

=== Ownership changes ===
In March 2013, the Competition Bureau approved a proposal by Bell Media to acquire Astral Media, under the condition that it divest itself of several television services and radio stations. Following the closure of the merger in July 2013, CISL was placed in a blind trust pending its eventual sale.

On August 26, 2013, Newcap Radio announced it would acquire CISL along with four other former Astral Media radio stations held under Bell Media's blind trust for $112 million. The deal was approved by the CRTC on March 19, 2014, and the sale closed on March 31, 2014.

On April 8, 2014, Newcap applied to move the CISL transmitter site to the former CKBD site, due to the imminent expiration of the lease on the transmitter site in August, and the unstable ground at that location. The application was approved on August 14. The move included a boost in the daytime power to 20,000 watts, coupled with a reduction in CISL's nighttime output to 4,000 watts. On August 25, 2014, CISL changed its branding to Smooth & Easy, CISL 650 AM.

=== Sale to Rogers, flip to sports ===
On April 25, 2017, Rogers Media announced that it would acquire CISL, and switch the station to a sports format branded as Sportsnet 650 later in the year. The move came as Rogers had acquired the radio rights to the Vancouver Canucks hockey team beginning in the 2017–18 season. The station would also assume the Toronto Blue Jays radio rights in Vancouver in the 2018 season. Both teams were previously broadcast by Bell Media's TSN Radio stations CFTE and CKST.

Rogers unveiled the station's programming lineup on August 23, 2017. The sale of the station was completed on August 27, 2017, with CISL ending music programming at 10 p.m. that evening. The final song on CISL was "American Pie" by Don McLean; by coincidence, the song was cut off right on the beginning of the titular lyric, specifically cutting off on the words "Bye bye". After a week off air, the station re-branded as Sportsnet 650 on September 4, becoming the first station from the Sportsnet Radio group to not use "The Fan" branding.

On August 28, 2017, CISL began digitally rebroadcasting on the HD Radio signal of co-owned CJAX-FM, using its third subchannel.

=== Closure ===
On July 7, 2026 Rogers announced that CISL had shut down as one of six radio station closures in various locations across the country, with the licence being returned to the CRTC.

== Logos ==
–2007

2007–2008

2008–2014

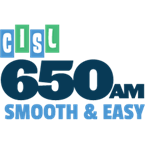
2014–2017
