= Frederick Gibbons =

American psychologist

Frederick X. Gibbons
- Education: University of Texas at Austin
- Scientific career
- Fields: Social psychology
- Workplaces: University of Connecticut, Dartmouth College, Iowa State University
- Thesis: Self-focused attention and the enhancement of response awareness (1976)
- Doctoral advisor: Robert Wicklund

Frederick X. "Rick" Gibbons is an American psychologist who has been a professor of psychology at the University of Connecticut since August 2012. His research focuses on social psychology and health psychology.

== Biography ==
Gibbons received his Ph.D. from the University of Texas at Austin in 1976. His Ph.D. thesis was entitled Self-focused attention and the enhancement of response awareness, and was supervised by Robert Wicklund. Before joining the faculty of the University of Connecticut, he taught at Iowa State University, where he became a distinguished professor before leaving to become a professor at Dartmouth College in 2008.
