= Jill Belland =

Canadian TV personality and businessperson

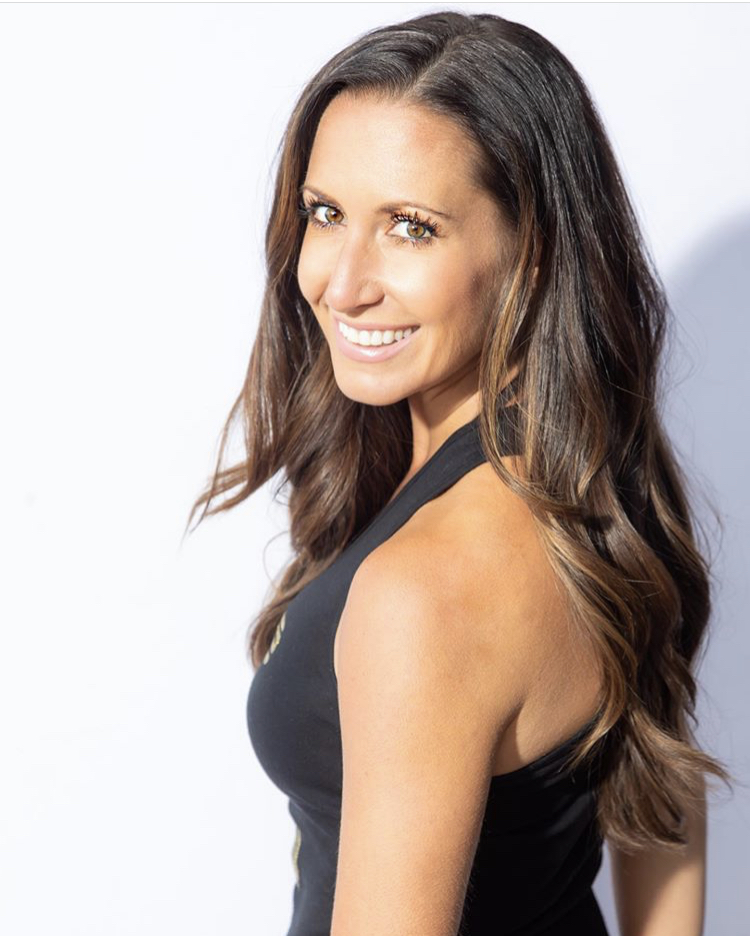
- Belland in 2020
- Born: January 25, 1979 (age 47); Edmonton, Alberta, Canada
- Education: Studied at the University of Calgary in the Faculty of Communications and Culture with a concentration in Media Studies
- Occupations: TV host and producer, dance/barre/pilates instructor, business owner
- Employer: Citytv Calgary

Jill Belland is a Canadian TV personality and business person. She is a co-owner of Barre Belle in Calgary, where she provides dance and exercise training. She was previously a TV host and producer at Citytv Calgary, where she was the "On Location Host" of Breakfast Television.

== Early life ==
Belland was born in Edmonton and moved to Calgary at a young age. She studied classical piano and trained to be a singer. Belland studied at the University of Calgary.

Belland joined the Calgary Stampeders Outriders cheerleading squad, which she was part of for four years. While with the Stampeders, she sang the national anthem at home games. She has also worked as a stage actress, performing in local productions such as Jesus Hopped the 'A' Train, The Full Monty, and Man Out of Joint.

== Broadcasting ==
Belland was hired by A-Channel in Calgary (CKAL-DT was previously known as A-Channel, and is now known as Citytv Calgary). Her initial job was "Coffee Girl" doing various gopher tasks for The Big Breakfast TV show. She then assisted in production with the Big Breakfast show and the station's news department.

In 2004, Belland was hired as an entertainment reporter for the show MTV Select. (at the time A-Channel and MTV Canada were both owned by Craig Media). She was then promoted to become host and producer of Wired on A-Channel in 2003. She also served as a host of Your City, Citytv's weekday evening show.

Belland became the host and producer of The City Show, a weekend show, that won the Rosie award for "Best News Information Series" by the Alberta Motion Picture Industries Association (AMPIA) in 2006. The City Show and Your City were cancelled in January 2010.

Belland has won AMPIA's "Best Host" award for 2009, 2010, and 2011. Belland was voted "Sexiest Women" in Calgary by Fast Forward Weekly readers in 2009. In 2011 she won another Rosie as Best TV Host for the Breakfast Show. Belland was included in Avenue Magazine's 2011 "Top 40 Under 40" list of Calgarian's.

== Fitness business ==
After covering Barre Body Studio for a segment on City in January 2013, she became a dance and fitness instructor there. In February 2016 Belland and friend Kristi Stuart opened up their own barre studio together, called Bare Belle.

As co-owner of Bare Belle, helped organize hundreds of other small business owners in June 2019 to call for a reduction of municipal taxes by Calgary's City Council, which did lower taxes by 10%.
