= Sportsnet Radio =

Sports talk radio brand in Canada

- Type: Sports radio network
- Country: Canada
- Availability: Toronto
- Owner: Rogers Sports & Media
- Launch date: January 2011
- Official website: Sportsnet Radio

Sportsnet Radio is the branding used by sports talk radio stations in Canada owned by Rogers Sports & Media, a division of Rogers Communications.

== Overview ==
The Toronto and Calgary stations (which maintain their former The Fan moniker in their names) were re-branded to increase their synergy with the co-owned Sportsnet television channel, amid indications that TSN would be launching a radio network of their own (which TSN indeed did, beginning with the conversion of CHUM in Toronto to TSN Radio 1050).

Rogers also operates the Sportsnet Radio Network (previously known as The Fan Radio Network), which is a syndication service distributing, among other programs, Toronto Blue Jays baseball and Tim and Sid. The network formerly distributed Prime Time Sports and the daily short-form feature Grapeline with Don Cherry and Brian Williams, both of which concluded their runs in 2019.

CJCL went through a few different Sportsnet brandings: under Telemedia, it was Sports Radio The Fan 590 (originally 1430), then Sportsnet Radio The Fan 590, then Sportsnet 590 The Fan.

On April 25, 2017, after having acquired the radio rights to the Vancouver Canucks, Rogers Media announced its intent to acquire CISL in Vancouver from Newcap Radio and convert it to the third Sportsnet-branded radio station as "Sportsnet 650". CISL is the third radio station part of the Sportsnet Radio Network and the third sports radio station in the Metro Vancouver market.

On July 7, 2026, Rogers Sports and Media announced CFAC and CISL would shut down as two of six radio station closures in various locations across the country, leaving CJCL Toronto as the only station with Sportsnet Radio branding.

== Stations ==
=== Current ===
Broadcast area	Station	Branding	Previous format
Toronto, Ontario	CJCL	Sportsnet 590 The Fan	Sports radio as The Fan 590

=== Former ===
Broadcast area	Station	Branding	Previous format
Calgary, Alberta	CFAC	Sportsnet 960 The Fan	Sports radio as The Fan 960
Vancouver, British Columbia	CISL	Sportsnet 650 Vancouver	Adult standards as CISL 650 Smooth & Easy
