= CJCO-DT =

Television station in Calgary

- Calgary, Alberta; Canada
- Channels: Digital: 34 (UHF); Virtual: 38
- Branding: Omni Television

Programming
- Affiliations: 38.1: Omni Television

Ownership
- Owner: Rogers Sports & Media; (Rogers Media Inc.)
- Sister stations: TV: CKAL-DT, Sportsnet West; Radio: CHFM-FM, CJAQ-FM

History
- First air date: September 15, 2008
- Former call signs: CJCO-TV (2008–2011)
- Former channel numbers: Analog: 38 (UHF, 2008–2011); Digital: 38 (UHF, 2011–2020)
- Call sign meaning: CJ Calgary's Omni

Technical information
- Licensing authority: CRTC
- ERP: 23.1 kW
- HAAT: 369.5 m (1,212 ft)
- Transmitter coordinates: 51°4′21″N 114°15′38″W

Links
- Website: Omni Alberta

CJCO-DT (channel 38) is a multicultural television station in Calgary, Alberta, Canada, part of the Omni Television network. It is owned and operated by Rogers Sports & Media alongside Citytv station CKAL-DT (channel 5). The two stations share studios at 7 Avenue and 5 Street Southwest in Downtown Calgary; CJCO-DT's transmitter is located near Old Banff Coach Road/Highway 563.

== Overview ==
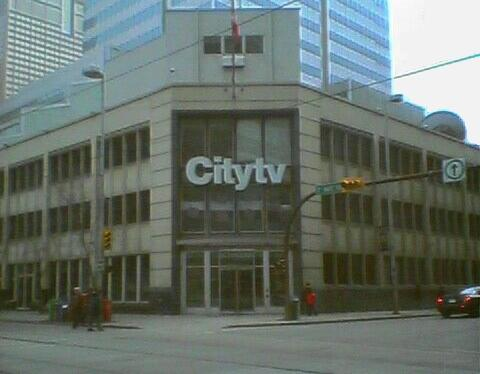
Omni's former studios with its sister station CKAL in Downtown Calgary.

The station was licensed by the Canadian Radio-television and Telecommunications Commission (CRTC) on June 8, 2007, and it launched on September 15, 2008. The station was originally assigned the call sign CHXC by Industry Canada, but this was changed to CJCO in February 2008.

CJCO-TV's pre-launch logo

Omni Alberta logo used from 2008 to 2018.

The station's primary focus is multicultural programming and documentaries. Like the other Omni stations across the country, the station once aired a large amount of syndicated American shows such as The Simpsons and The King of Queens, but those have since been dropped as of the start of the 2015–16 season.

== Newscasts ==
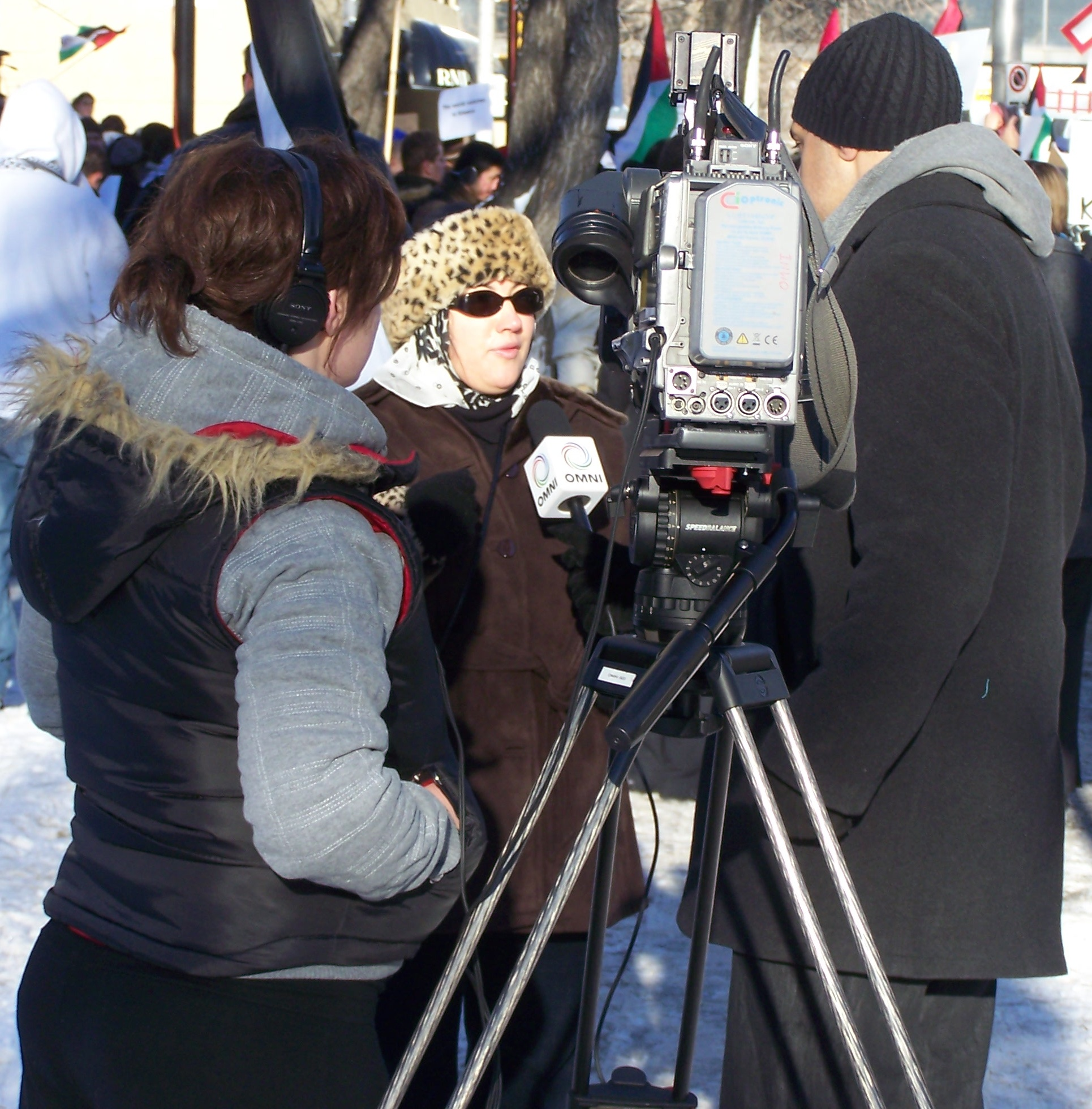
An OMNI TV news crew interviews a protester at a pro-Gaza rally in Downtown Calgary on December 31, 2008

Omni Alberta formerly produced local newscasts aimed at the Cantonese, Mandarin, and South Asian communities across the province. While there were newsgathering teams in both Edmonton and Calgary, the production of the newscasts themselves were done out of CKEM's studios in Downtown Edmonton. The newscasts were discontinued and replaced by Omni's national newscasts in September 2011; the national newscasts still featured contributions from Calgary-based reporters.

On May 30, 2013, Rogers announced that it would immediately close down the production facilities for both Omni Alberta stations as a result of budget cuts—ending the production of local programming and news content from the stations.

== Technical information ==
=== Subchannel ===
Subchannel of CJCO-DT
| Channel | Res. | Short name | Programming |
|---|---|---|---|
| 38.1 | 1080i | OMNI | Omni Television |

=== Analog-to-digital conversion ===
On August 11, 2011, three weeks before Canadian television stations in CRTC-designated mandatory markets transitioned from analogue to digital broadcasts, CJCO shut down its analog transmitter and flash cut its digital signal into operation on UHF channel 38.

As of July 28, 2020, due to the DTV spectrum repack happening across North America, CJCO-DT has moved from UHF 38 to UHF 34. The virtual channel remains as 38.1.
