= CJAQ-FM =

Radio station in Calgary

- Calgary, Alberta; Canada
- Broadcast area: Calgary Metropolitan Region
- Frequency: 96.9 MHz
- Branding: Jack 96.9

Programming
- Format: Adult hits

Ownership
- Owner: Rogers Radio; (Rogers Media, Inc.)
- Sister stations: CHFM-FM, CKAL-DT, CJCO-DT

History
- First air date: 1927
- Former call signs: CJCJ (1927–1950); CKXL (1950–1987); CISS (1987–1991); CFXX (1991–1992); CFXL (1992–1996); CKIS-FM (1996–1999, 2003–2009); CHRK-FM (1999–2003)
- Former frequencies: 690 kHz (1927–1941); 1230 kHz (1941–1947); 1140 kHz (1947–1996)
- Call sign meaning: sounds like "Jack"

Technical information
- Class: C1
- ERP: 48,000 watts average 100,000 watts peak
- HAAT: 160 metres (520 ft)
- Transmitter coordinates: 51.0383°N 114.224°W
- Repeaters: CJAQ-FM-1 94.1 Banff; CJAQ-FM-2 97.3 Invermere

Links
- Webcast: Listen live
- Website: jack969.ca

CJAQ-FM (96.9 MHz) is a Canadian radio station in Calgary, Alberta. The station uses the on-air brand name Jack 96.9. It is the second "Jack" station in Canada and the world, after its sister CJAX-FM in Vancouver. CJAQ's studios are located on 7th Avenue Southwest in downtown Calgary, while its transmitter is located on Patina Hill Drive Southwest in the Prominence Point neighbourhood in west Calgary.

As of Winter 2020, CJAQ is the 8th-most-listened-to radio station in the Calgary market according to a PPM data report released by Numeris.

== History ==
The station originally signed on in 1927 as CJCJ, an AM radio station located on 690 AM. In the 1941 great frequency shuffle of most North American AM stations it moved the 1230 AM frequency before shifting to its longtime frequency of 1140 AM in 1947.

In 1950, it adopted the call letters that it would become most historically identified with by most Calgary radio listeners, CKXL, often branded as XL Radio 1140. Purchased by Moffat Communications in 1964, CKXL adopted a Top 40 format in the 1960s and was the top rated station in Calgary from the late 1960s through the early 1980s. Popular personalities on CKXL during this period included Buddy B, Ted Pound, Gord Robson, Rob Christie (as Rob Lowe), Dr. Dan Gavin, Norm Edwards, Greg Haroldson and Gentleman Jim Jackson. Moffat would purchase CHFM-FM Calgary in December 1972.

On September 4, 1987, the station dropped Top 40 for adult contemporary as CISS AM 1140 with the CISS call letters. A year later, it went oldies full-time. Two talk shows (Charles Adler and The Larry King Show) were also added briefly in 1990. On August 1, 1991, the station flipped to classic rock as The Fox with the CFXX call letters.

The station was sold by its owner, Moffat Communications to Golden West Broadcasting in 1992, as Moffat divested itself of its entire radio division. CHFM-FM was purchased by Rogers Broadcasting on the same date. In late 1992, the XL Radio brand was resurrected (this time using the CFXL call letters) using an older-skewing MOR format. Rawlco Communications, then owner of 66-CFR would purchase a controlling interest in CFXL in 1994, also receiving approval to move the station to the FM dial at 96.9 MHz.

On June 3, 1996, at 1 p.m., the station moved to the FM band and changed formats to Hot AC as Kiss FM, with the CKIS calls (previously, they were used by CHUM Radio-owned CKGM Montreal). "Pirate Radio with Chris Sheppard" was a featured show on the station at the time. The station changed calls to CHRK on October 1, 1999, and returned to classic rock as Rock 97 when Rogers acquired the station. CHRK was one of two rock stations in Calgary at the time, alongside CJAY 92; the latter rock station still uses this brand today. The station changed to urban music on July 19, 2002, and returned the "Kiss" branding to the station. On April 1, 2003, at midnight, the station returned to its CKIS calls and flipped to its current format.

The station flipped call signs with CJAQ in Toronto, Ontario in June 2009, after the Toronto station was rebranded from "Jack FM" to "Kiss".

== Previous Jack FM logos ==
2002-2012

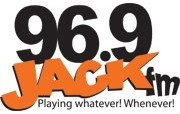
2012-2017

== Rebroadcasters ==
CJAQ-FM has repeaters in Alberta and British Columbia:

Rebroadcasters of CJAQ-FM
City of licence	Identifier	Frequency	Power	Class	RECNet	CRTC Decision
Banff^{1}	CJAQ-FM-1	94.1 FM	(Horizontal only) 20 average watts 39 peak watts	A	Query	2004-466
Invermere, British Columbia	CJAQ-FM-2	97.3 FM	(Horizontal only) 20 average watts 50 peak watts	LP	Query	

^{1} In 1997, rebroadcaster CJAQ-FM-1 received CRTC approval to operate at 94.3 FM, until it moved to its current frequency at 94.1 FM in 2004.
