= CHFM-FM =

Radio station in Calgary

Coordinates: 51°03′37″N 114°10′17″W

- Calgary, Alberta; Canada
- Broadcast area: Calgary Metropolitan Region
- Frequency: 95.9 MHz
- Branding: Star 95.9

Programming
- Format: Adult contemporary

Ownership
- Owner: Rogers Radio; (Rogers Media, Inc.)
- Sister stations: CJAQ-FM, CKAL-DT, CJCO-DT

History
- First air date: 1962
- Call sign meaning: Calgary High Fidelity Music

Technical information
- Class: C
- ERP: 48,000 watts average 100,000 watts peak
- HAAT: 160 metres (520 ft)
- Repeater: CHFM-FM-1 99.3 Banff

Links
- Webcast: Listen Live
- Website: star959.ca

CHFM-FM (95.9 MHz Star 95.9) is a Canadian radio station broadcasting in Calgary, Alberta. Owned by Rogers Radio, a division of Rogers Sports & Media, the station broadcasts an adult contemporary format. CHFM's studios are located on 7th Avenue Southwest in Downtown Calgary, while its transmitter is located on Patina Hill Drive Southwest in West Calgary.

As of Winter 2020, CHFM is the 4th-most-listened-to radio station in the Calgary market according to a PPM data report released by Numeris.

== History ==
CHFM was Calgary's first FM radio station when it signed on the air in 1962, as a beautiful music/easy listening station. Moffat Communications (owners of the top-40 CKXL in Calgary) purchased the station in 1972. The station would move to a soft rock/adult contemporary format in the early-1980s as FM96. Personalities at the station during this time included Kevin Nelson (son of long time 1050 CHUM morning personality Jay Nelson), Cal Walker, Paul Boucher, Colleen Troy, Marilyn Denis, Chris Coburn and Gerry Forbes.

In August 1992, Moffat Communications sold CHFM to Rogers Broadcasting as part of the company's divestiture of its radio division. In December 1992, the station rebranded as Lite 96 CHFM, becoming one of the most popular stations in Calgary. Don Stevens, Joanne Johnson and Jamie (The Coach) Herbison became the morning show hosts in March 1993. Other personalities included Dan Willmott, Charlee Morgan, Darren Robson and Bruce Ritchie. During the 1990s, other programs heard on CHFM included “Sex, Lives and Audiotape”, hosted by Rhona Raskin and “Lovers and Other Strangers”, hosted by Don Jackson of sister station CHFI-FM, in syndication. By 2004, the station moved to a more upbeat adult contemporary playlist, removed many of the older tracks along with the call letters from its on air branding. Christina Rowsell would replace long term mid-day host Charlee Morgan in 2008. Jamie (the Coach) Herbison departed Lite 96 mornings in December 2009.

Lite 96 would become Lite 95.9 in 2011 with a slight format change to Hot AC, away from their long running soft music tradition. Mookie Wilson and Billie Jo Ross became the morning show hosts in March 2011, when Don and Joanne left after 18 years, to do mornings at [[CFXL-FM]]. Kris Mazurak (known on air as Maz) would replace Bruce Ritchie in afternoons during this time.

The station rebranded as Kiss 95.9 on December 26, 2013. In December 2017, the station returned to AC and rebranded using its call letters, with branding modelled after sister station CHFI in Toronto.

In February 2022, the station rebranded as Star 95.9 and introduced a new on-air lineup.
