= CKAL-DT =

Television station in Calgary

- Calgary, Alberta; Canada
- Channels: Digital: 20 (UHF); Virtual: 5
- Branding: Citytv Calgary (general); CityNews Calgary (newscasts)

Programming
- Affiliations: 5.1: Citytv

Ownership
- Owner: Rogers Sports & Media; (Rogers Media Inc.)
- Sister stations: TV: CJCO-DT, Sportsnet West; Radio: CHFM-FM, CJAQ-FM

History
- First air date: September 20, 1997
- Former call signs: CKAL-TV (1997–2011)
- Former channel numbers: Analog: 5 (VHF, 1997–2011); Digital: 49 (UHF, until 2020)
- Former affiliations: A-Channel (1997–2005)

Technical information
- Licensing authority: CRTC
- ERP: 112 kW
- HAAT: 369.5 m (1,212 ft)
- Transmitter coordinates: 51°4′21″N 114°15′38″W
- Repeater: CKAL-DT-1 Lethbridge (See below)

Links
- Website: Citytv Calgary

CKAL-DT (channel 5) is a television station in Calgary, Alberta, Canada, owned and operated by the Citytv network, a division of Rogers Sports & Media. It is sister to Omni Television outlet CJCO-DT (channel 38). The two stations share studios at 7 Avenue and 5 Street Southwest in Downtown Calgary; CKAL-DT's transmitter is located near Old Banff Coach Road/Highway 563.

CKAL was built as part of A-Channel, the regional television service constructed by Craig Broadcast Systems in 1997. Broadcasting from studios downtown, it was the first new commercial TV station in Calgary since 1975; its style of news and programming was young and aggressive. Ratings settled into third place, above the CBC but behind the established stations in town, CFCN and CICT.

Craig, overextended by its launch of Toronto 1 in 2003, sold itself to CHUM Limited, then-owner of Citytv, in 2004. In 2005, the A-Channel stations took on the Citytv brand. Due to poor ratings and as part of a wave of layoffs, CHUM reduced the size of its local operation in Calgary in 2006, cancelling the station's evening newscast. CHUM sold most of its assets to Bell Globemedia that same year; as Bell owned the CTV Television Network, the Citytv stations were spun off to Rogers. The station reinstated evening local news programs in 2018 but cancelled its version of Breakfast Television in 2020.

== A-Channel ==
=== Hearing process ===
In 1993, The Alberta Channel Inc., a majority-owned company of Craig Broadcast Systems, applied to the Canadian Radio-television and Telecommunications Commission (CRTC) for a television service in the province of Alberta, to be known as The Alberta Channel (or A-Channel, for short). Craig owned two stations in its home province of Manitoba, namely CKX-TV, a CBC Television affiliate in Brandon, and the Manitoba Television Network (MTN) in Portage la Prairie and serving Winnipeg. Craig's application competed with AltaWest Television, a subsidiary of the CanWest Global System. The Alberta Channel promised stations in Calgary and Edmonton as well as repeaters to serve Drumheller, Lethbridge, and Red Deer. The Calgary and Edmonton stations would each offer 20 hours a week of local news plus the same amount of non-news local programming. The AltaWest bid, part of network parent CanWest's bid to turn Global into a third national network, envisioned a main station in Calgary. In the end, the CRTC opted not to award either group a licence, saying that neither proposal "would have added sufficient diversity" to Alberta television and would have harmed the province's existing television broadcasters.

In 1996, CanWest and Craig tried again with plans for new television service in Alberta. The A-Channel stations in Calgary and Edmonton would be autonomous, each employing 139 people; Craig also promised a C$14 million investment in independent television production in Alberta. The newscasts would have a style similar to Citytv in Toronto; U.S. entertainment programming would come from previously untapped sources, such as Fox and UPN.

Both bids drew concern from rural broadcasters, such as RDTV in Red Deer. Edmonton's CITV protested the CanWest bid, believing it would cause "an unbalancing of the Canadian broadcasting system". CITV subleased the Edmonton-market rights to many popular U.S. shows from CanWest and stood to lose much of its highest-rated programming were they to establish a Global station there.

After a hearing in July, the CRTC issued a ruling in favor of A-Channel and against CanWest in November 1996. Unlike two years prior, it found the Alberta television market to be "stronger than the national average". Craig won out because of its promises to air more local programming and schedule more Canadian production in prime time. CanWest appealed to the federal cabinet, having suffered a blow to its ambitions of constructing a third national network. It believed that the smaller Craig, which it called "boutique", was less preferable than a third national choice for Canadians. The cabinet rejected CanWest's appeal in January 1997 and permitted Craig to construct the A-Channel stations, though it endorsed inquiries into a third national TV network, a minor win for the company.

=== Construction and early years ===
Logo used as A-Channel, used from 1997 to 2005

With the licence awards approved, Craig began construction on the Calgary station. It built studios downtown at 7th Avenue and 5th Street SW, adjacent to the LRT system; this made A-Channel the only major media outlet in the city to be built in the downtown area. As in Edmonton, much of the on-air talent came from elsewhere in Canada.

A-Channel launched in Edmonton on September 18, 1997. Two days later, CKAL-TV launched on channel 5, cable 8. Both stations relied on prime-time movies, a formula Craig had used with some success at MTN in Manitoba. For local programming, the station featured a two-hour morning show, The Big Breakfast; 6 and 10 p.m. newscasts; and the local programs Live @ Five and Wired, among others. The station's early weeks on air were riddled with technical issues, some of which also befell the Edmonton station. Many of the issues came down to the tapeless playback and editing system used for segments: over five days, the Calgary control room was rewired to bypass it in favor of older, but more reliable, video tape equipment, which led to far fewer on-air errors. A-Channel had a Hummer as a news vehicle; when the city experienced heavy snowfall in March 1998, it used the Hummer to deliver Meals on Wheels and to ferry snowed-in doctors to the hospital.

Craig agreed in building A-Channel to provide some protection to rural broadcasters by delaying the launch of rebroadcasters for one year. As a result, A-Channel did not open its repeater in Lethbridge, authorized with the rest of the network, until September 1998.

BBM figures for spring 1998 showed A-Channel Calgary in third place in prime time, though its dinner-hour news lagged the CBC. Over the next two years, the stations became more competitive with ratings rises for their local morning and evening programming. In local news, the stations built identities as aggressive outlets. In an assessment of the Calgary station in 1999, Gary Davies noted, "It's very rare to attend a media event in this city and not see a representative from A-Channel."

=== Acquisition by CHUM ===
On April 12, 2004, CHUM Limited announced a deal to purchase Craig Media for $265 million. The move came more than a month after the CRTC denied CHUM's applications for new Calgary and Edmonton stations because the market did not have sufficient advertising revenue to support a new entrant. With the sale pending, Craig cut costs; in May 2004, the company laid off nine employees at A-Channel Calgary and another twenty-eight at Toronto 1. The sale was approved by the Canadian Radio-television and Telecommunications Commission on November 19, 2004. CHUM had to sell off Toronto 1 because it already owned stations in Toronto (CITY) and nearby Barrie (CKVR); Toronto 1 was sold to Quebecor Media, owners of the media units TVA and Sun Media.

CHUM acquired all outstanding shares in Learning and Skills Television of Alberta (also known as Access Media Group)—which operated Access, the provincial educational broadcaster—in February 2005. CHUM then consolidated Access Media Group's Edmonton operations with its own; traffic and master control were moved to Calgary and Toronto, resulting in 17 layoffs in Edmonton while creating four jobs in Calgary. The Calgary facility was already handling master control functions for A-Channel Edmonton.

== Citytv ==
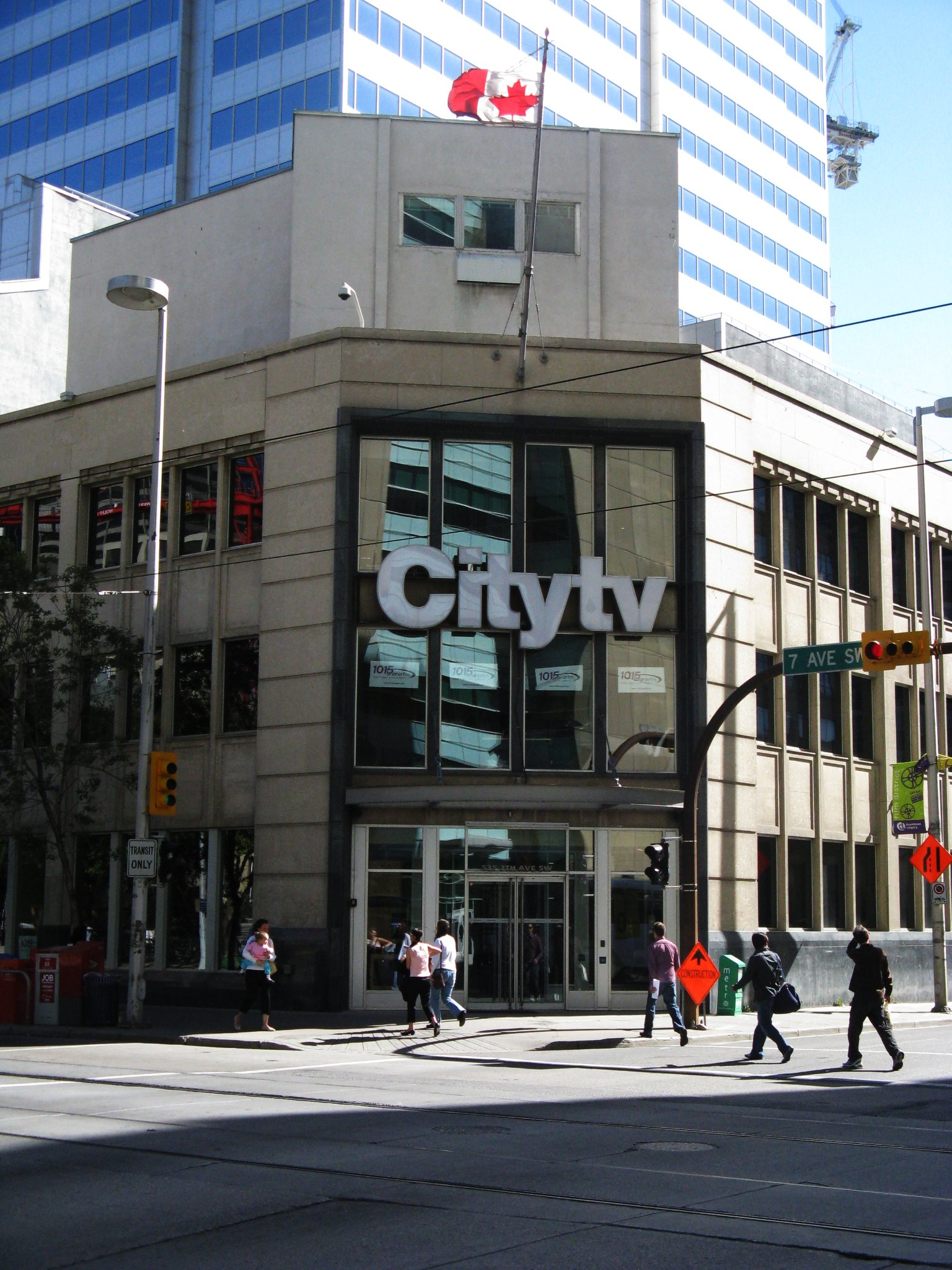
Citytv's studios and offices in Downtown Calgary

=== Rebrand and news cuts ===
In addition to launching The Bounce and becoming the sole owner of Access Media Group in February 2005, CHUM announced that it would rebrand the three A-Channel stations—in Calgary, Edmonton, and Winnipeg—as Citytv, aligning with the stations it already owned in Toronto and Vancouver. No other significant changes were made, since the A-Channel stations' on-air look had always been very similar to that of Citytv; they initially retained their local programs, relaunched under Citytv's Breakfast Television morning brand and CityNews news brand. CHUM hoped to lift the stations' ratings with the new moniker. The change took effect on August 2 of the same year, when the A-Channel name was transferred to CHUM's NewNet stations.

On June 13, 2006, CHUM announced that it would dramatically reduce its newsgathering operations in Edmonton, Calgary, and Winnipeg, as well as in several other cities. It laid off 195 part- and full-time employees. The evening newscasts were cancelled, while the noon newscast and Breakfast Television remained on the air. In a coincidental development, that same day, BCE Inc., the parent company of CTV, announced it would buy CHUM Limited.

=== Under Rogers ownership ===
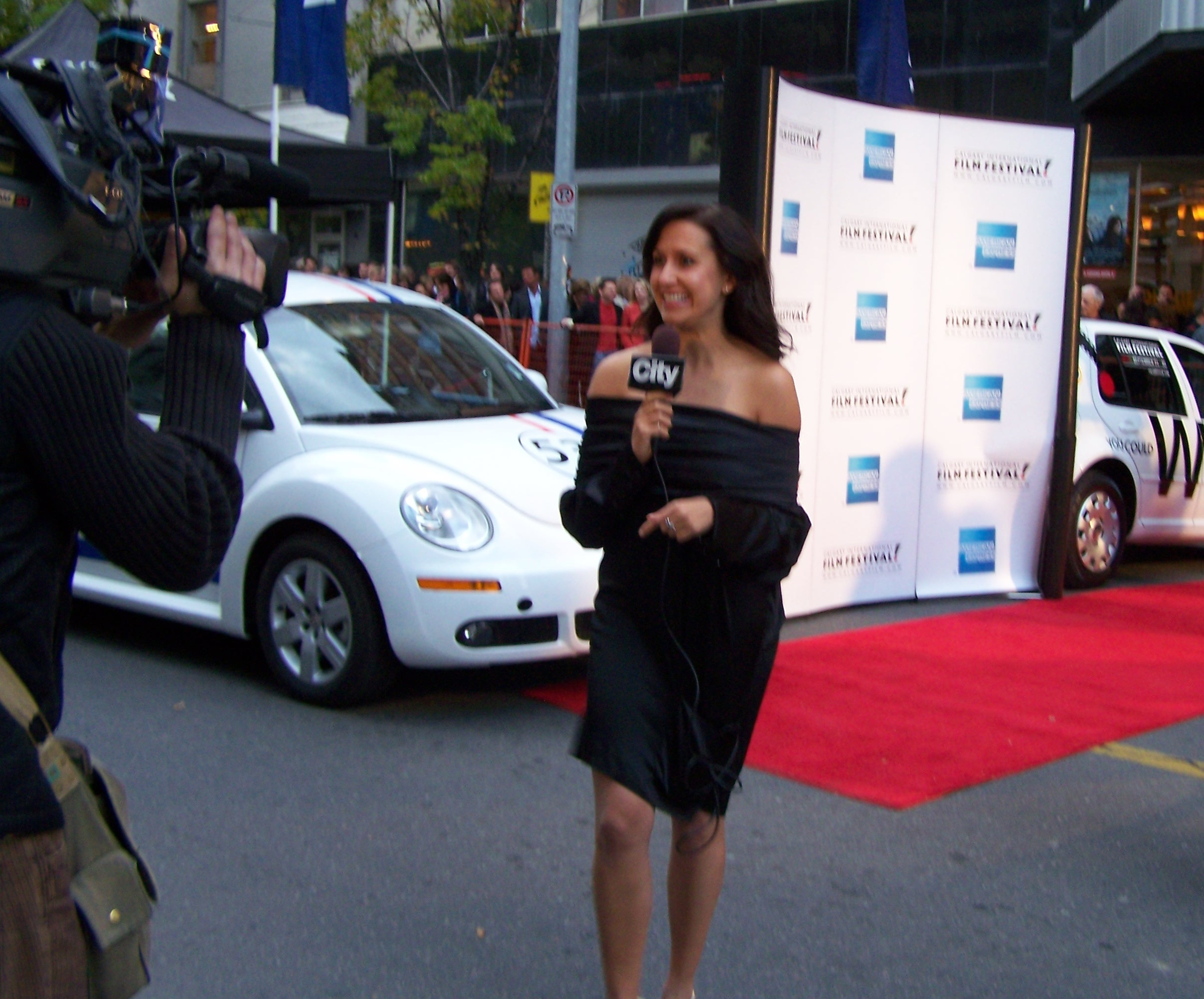
Jill Belland covering the 2007 Calgary International Film Festival for Citytv

The CRTC announced its approval of CTVglobemedia's purchase of CHUM Limited on June 8, 2007, but the commission added a condition that CTVglobemedia sell off CHUM's Citytv stations to another buyer while allowing it to retain the A-Channel stations. The following Monday, Rogers Communications agreed to buy the five Citytv stations. The sale was approved by the CRTC on September 28, 2007. In 2008, Rogers launched Omni Calgary, part of its Omni Television multicultural station group.

On January 19, 2010, CityNews at Noon, Your City, and CityNews International were cancelled as part of Citytv's corporate restructuring and concurrent layoffs; Breakfast Television was trimmed from four hours to three. The CRTC approved the installation of digital transmission facilities for CKAL-TV on channel 49 that same year, ahead of the August 31, 2011, digital television switchover date. In 2011, Rogers also converted the Lethbridge transmitter to digital operation.

Another eight years would pass before the station resumed offering evening news programming; as part of a larger expansion of local news programming across the Citytv stations, Citytv Calgary debuted hour-long 6 and 11 p.m. newscasts on September 3, 2018. Rogers laid off 11 employees in Calgary on September 5, 2019, and placed Breakfast Television on hiatus until September 23. At that time, the program was relaunched with a new hybrid format, consisting of a mixture of local content with national entertainment and lifestyle segments produced from Toronto. The program continued for another 14 months until it was cancelled as part of a round of cuts conducted by Rogers Sports & Media across the country.

== Notable former on–air staff ==
- Jill Belland – reporter and host
- Jebb Fink – host of The Big Breakfast and later Your City
- Liza Fromer
- Robin Gill – news anchor on The Big Breakfast, 1997–2000
- Tyler Harcott – entertainment show host
- Ross Hull – meteorologist
- Dave Kelly – host of The Big Breakfast and Breakfast Television, 1997–2009
- Sandra Jansen – host of the Calgary edition of Your City
- Tara Slone – co-host of Breakfast Television

== Technical information ==
=== Subchannel ===
Subchannel of CKAL-DT
Subchannel	Res.	Short name	Programming
5.1	1080i	CityTV	Citytv

=== Rebroadcaster ===
Technical information for CKAL-DT-1
Call sign	Location	Channel	ERP	HAAT	Transmitter coordinates
CKAL-DT-1	Lethbridge	29 (UHF); Virtual: 2.1	58.5 kW	191.1 m (627 ft)	49°40′57″N 112°55′38″W
