= CKMX =

Radio station in Calgary (1922–2023)

Defunct
- Calgary, Alberta; Canada
- Broadcast area: Calgary Metropolitan Region
- Frequency: 1060 kHz

Programming
- Affiliations: CBC Dominion (1944–1962); 24/7 Comedy (2010–2014)

Ownership
- Owner: Bell Media; (Bell Media Radio)
- Sister stations: CIBK-FM, CJAY-FM

History
- First air date: May 18, 1922
- Last air date: June 14, 2023 (101 years, 27 days)
- Former call signs: CFCN (1922–1994)
- Former frequencies: 440 metres (1922–1925); 690 kHz (1925–1931); 985 kHz (1931–1933); 1030 kHz (1933–1937); 1010 kHz (1937–1947)
- Call sign meaning: Mix (former branding)

Technical information
- Class: B
- Power: 50,000 watts
- Transmitter coordinates: 50.9006°N 113.875°W
- Repeater: CFVP

CKMX was a radio station licensed to broadcast at 1060 AM in Calgary, Alberta, and owned by Bell Media. Its comedy format was branded on-air as Funny 1060. CKMX's studios were located in the CTV Calgary Studios on Patina Rise SW in the Prominence Point neighborhood of Calgary, and its transmitter site near Southeast Calgary. At night, CKMX could be heard as far west as Battle Ground and Snohomish, Washington. It could also be heard on shortwave on 6.03 MHz via its repeater CFVP, reaching western North America.

As of Winter 2020, CKMX was the 18th-most-listened-to radio station in the Calgary market according to a PPM data report released by Numeris.

== History ==
CKMX was first licensed as a broadcasting station, with the original call sign CFCN, to W. W. Grant Radio, Ltd. of Calgary, Alberta in May 1922. However, the station's founder, William Walter Westover Grant, already had extensive experience with radio development, and a 1923 company advertisement credited him with 13 years of work designing and building radio apparatus, as well as "The construction and installation of the greater portion of Radio-telephone apparatus used by the Royal Air Force during the war", in addition to "The construction of seven commercial and government Radio Stations, including the famous 'High River' Station".

Grant served in the British Royal Air in France during World War I, where he gained experience installing and maintaining radio equipment. After the war ended, he returned to Canada where reportedly in May 1919 he "constructed a small station in Halifax, Nova Scotia, over which voice and music were broadcast in probably the first scheduled programs in Canada".

In 1920, Grant began working for the Canadian Air Board's Forestry patrol, developing air-to-ground communication for the spotter aircraft used to report forest fires, initially using radiotelegraphy. The original base was located at Morley, Alberta, where Grant constructed station CYAA. In January 1921 operations moved to the High River Air Station in southern Alberta, where Grant established station VAW, which was capable of audio transmissions. In addition to the forestry work Grant began making a series of experimental entertainment broadcasts, believed to be the first in western Canada. In early April 1922 the Calgary Herald reported that "Residents of High River have enjoyed several concerts 'out of the atmosphere' during the past few months", with VAW maintaining a regular broadcasting schedule on Tuesday and Friday evenings, on a wavelength of 360 meters (833 kHz.) A March 31, 1922 musical program from High River was reported heard in Hawaii, about 2,800 miles (4,500 kilometers) away.

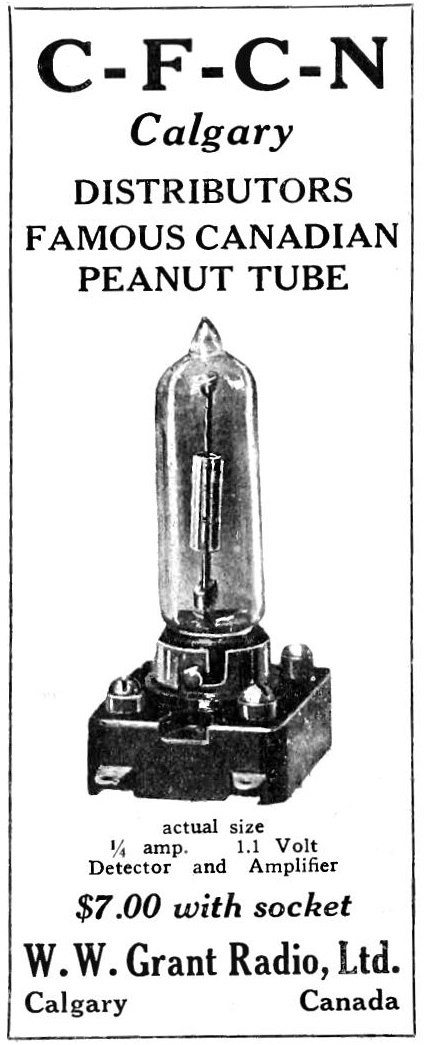
1923 advertisement for W. W. Grant Radio, Ltd. and radio station CFCN

In Canada there was no formal category for stations making entertainment broadcasts intended for the general public until April 1922, so the earliest stations making broadcasts operated under a mixture of Experimental, Amateur, and, as was the case with VAW, governmental authorizations. In 1922 federal regulators added a new licence classification of "Private Commercial Broadcasting station", and in late April 1922 an initial group of twenty-three station assignments was announced, including two in Calgary: CFAC, licensed to George M. Bell on a wavelength of 430 meters (698 kHz), and CHCQ, licensed to the Calgary Herald newspaper on 400 meters (750 kHz). Grant, from his base in High River, provided some technical assistance to the newspaper when it was setting up CHCQ.

Grant left the forestry project and established the W. W. Grant Radio, Ltd. in Calgary, which on May 18 was issued the city's third commercial broadcasting station license, with the randomly assigned call letters CFCN, operating on 440 meters (682 kHz). In 1923 the station's transmitter was upgraded from 100 to 1,000 watts, as part of a reconstruction following "a devastating fire which destroyed the plant of the W. W. Grant Radio Ltd." A few months later CFCN, now using the slogan "The Voice of the Prairie", had a further upgrade to 8,500 watts, a very high power for the time period.

In addition to operating the radio station, Grant's company sold a line of "Voice of the Prairie" brand receivers, however the Westinghouse corporation sued him for infringing certain of its patents. On July 3, 1926 the Exchequer Court ruled in Grant's favor, but on appeal the Supreme Court of Canada on October 4, 1927 reversed the decision. To pay his outstanding legal fees, Grant arranged to sell CFCN to H. Gordon Love.

The station became a phantom station affiliate of the Canadian National Railway radio network and later of the Canadian Broadcasting Corporation's Dominion Network, until it dissolved in 1962. In 1947, CFCN moved to the station's current AM frequency at 1060 kHz. The call letters were changed to CKMX in the fall of 1994 when Maclean-Hunter sold it to Standard Broadcasting while retaining ownership of sister station CFCN-TV, and switched the format to hot adult contemporary. The format was shifted to alternative rock in mid-1993 under the name Mix 1060 from Top 40/CHR as AM106. On December 1, 1995, the station adopted an adult standards format.

Former logo as Classic Country AM 1060

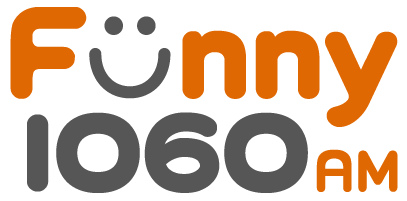
Logo as Funny 1060, 2013-2023

In 2005, the station adopted a classic country format. CKMX had the distinction of being the last radio station in Canada to broadcast a continuous classic country format (other Canadian classic country stations, such as CJDL and CFCW, were more accurately "traditional country", as these stations also carried contemporary hits). According to the Fall 2011 PPM data report, released by BBM Canada, Classic Country AM 1060 was ranked #15 for the Calgary market. Standard Broadcasting was acquired by Astral Media in 2007, and in turn by Bell Media in 2013. The Bell purchase reunited CKMX with its former television sister.

On September 12, 2013, at 6 a.m., the station flipped from classic country to an all-comedy format as Funny 1060, which features stand-up comedy bits performed by major stand-up and improvisational comedians. The station was one of several Bell-owned stations to air programming from the U.S. syndicated radio network 24/7 Comedy—which was first launched in Canada by sister station CKSL in London, Ontario by Astral Media's syndication arm Orbyt Media (now a part of Bell) in 2012.

On June 14, 2023, as part of a mass corporate restructuring at Bell Media, the company shut down 6 of their AM radio stations nationwide, including CKMX. The station ended regular programming at 9 a.m. that day, replaced with a looped message about the impending shutdown, which lasted until the completion of the sign-off.

In May 2024, Akash Broadcasting–owner of multilingual stations CKER-FM Edmonton and CJCN-FM Surrey—filed an application to acquire CKMX and Winnipeg sister station CFRW from Bell. While the application to acquire CFRW was approved, interveners believed the acquisition of CKMX would be detrimental to existing ethnic stations in Calgary, and the CRTC therefore denied the sale. The CRTC ruled that Akash's proposed acquisition of a commercial station "would have a limited impact on enhancing the diversity of the market", and noted that it had already issued calls for applications for a new radio station in Calgary that had encouraged applications from ethnic and First Nations broadcasters.

Both CKMX (mediumwave) and CFVP-SW's licences were revoked on May 28, 2026.

== Shortwave relay ==
CFVP
Defunct
- Calgary, Alberta; Canada
- Broadcast area: Western North America; Worldwide
- Frequencies: 6.03 MHz, 49 m shortwave band

Ownership
- Owner: Bell Media
- Sister stations: CKMX, CJAY-FM, CIBK-FM

History
- First air date: 1931
- Last air date: June 14, 2023
- Call sign meaning: Voice of the Prairies

Technical information
- Licensing authority: CRTC
- Power: 100 watts
- Transmitter coordinates: 51.0658059°N 114.0713204°W

CFVP was the full-time shortwave rebroadcaster of CKMX. CFVP broadcast at a power of 100 watts on 6.03 MHz in the 49 m shortwave band.

CFVP began in 1931 as a rebroadcaster to then-CFCN. Its license was renewed for a period between March 1, 2021 – August 31, 2027 along with CKMX. Nevertheless, the relay ceased broadcasting along with CKMX on June 14, 2023.
