= CFRN =

CFRN may refer to:

- CFRN (AM), a radio station (1260 AM) licensed to serve Edmonton, Alberta, Canada
- CFRN-DT, a television station (channel 3) licensed to serve Edmonton
- CFBR-FM, a radio station (100.3 FM) licensed to serve Edmonton, which held the call sign CFRN-FM from 1951 to 1979
- Certified Flight Registered Nurse
- Coalition for Rainforest Nations
