= Rock the Park =

Annual music concert held in London, Ontario, Canada

RBC Rock the Park
- Genre: 2004 to 2008: Classic rock 2009 to present: Classic rock, rock, modern rock, country, hip hop
- Dates: 2025: July 8-12
- Frequency: Annual
- Locations: Harris Park, London, Ontario
- Years active: 2004 – present
- Website: www.rockthepark.ca

RBC Rock the Park, formerly known as Start.ca Rocks the Park and Hawk Rocks the Park, is an annual music concert held at Harris Park in London, Ontario, Canada. From 2004 to 2008, it was primarily a classic rock concert sponsored by radio station 103.9 The Hawk. In 2010, the three-day concert was sponsored by three radio stations: 98.1 Free FM, FM96, and country music station BX93.

For the first 12 years, the purpose of the event was to raise money for Bethany's Hope Foundation for MLD Research, which raised over $2.2 million.

Since 2016, Rock the Park has teamed up with the following charities: Big Brothers Big Sisters of London and Area, Make-A-Wish Southwestern Ontario and Children's Health Foundation, while also supporting Western Mustangs Football. In 2019, they rebranded the name to Start.ca Rocks the Park with their partnership with Start.ca. In 2023, they again rebranded to RBC Rock the Park to reflect their partnership with Royal Bank of Canada.

== Rock the Park I ==
The first Rock the Park was held July 22–24 in 2004. Its main function was to raise money for Bethany's Hope Foundation and it raised more than $110,000. It featured several musical groups:

Thursday, July 22

- Blood, Sweat & Tears
- Randy Bachman
- Lighthouse
- Voodoo Lounge

Friday, July 23

- Alice Cooper
- Foghat
- Edgar Winter
- Helix

Saturday, July 24

- Steppenwolf
- April Wine
- Honeymoon Suite
- Goddo

== Hawk Rocks the Park... Again ==
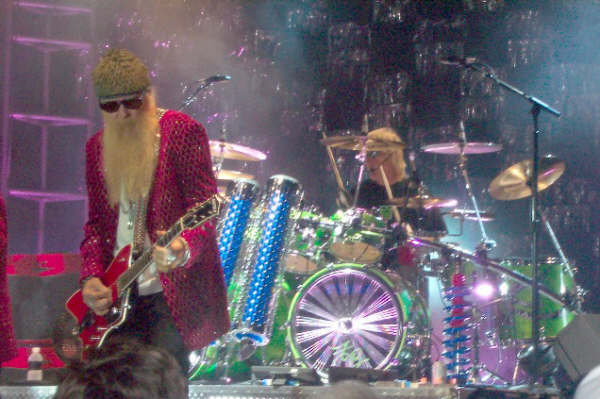
ZZ Top plays at Hawk Rocks The Park Again

The second edition of Rock the Park was held over four days during July 21–24, 2005. Due to the success of the first concert, this second one was expanded to four days, during which over 40,000 Rock fans attended. It featured:

Thursday, July 21

- ZZ Top
- Randy Bachman
- Brian Howe
- Trooper
- Jimmy Bowskill Band

Friday, July 22

- Lou Gramm (Former singer of Foreigner)
- April Wine
- Sass Jordan
- Chilliwack

Saturday, July 23

- REO Speedwagon
- Glass Tiger
- The Box
- Superfreak

Sunday, July 24

- George Thorogood & The Destroyers
- David Wilcox
- Thundermug (Playing in their last concert for a long time)

== Rock the Park III ==
Held July 20–22, 2006, the groups that took part were:

Thursday, July 20

- Peter Frampton
- Eddie Money
- Loverboy
- Ray Lyell & The Storm

Friday, July 21

- Styx
- Kim Mitchell
- April Wine
- Saga

Saturday, July 22

- Alice Cooper
- Vince Neil (of Mötley Crüe)
- Quiet Riot
- Helix

Rock the Park III managed to raise $180,021 for the Bethany's Hope Foundation.

== Hawk Rocks the Park: Back 4 More ==
Rock the Park IV was run July 26–28, 2007.

Thursday, July 26

- Deep Purple
- Ted Nugent
- Nazareth
- Honeymoon Suite

Friday, July 27

- Pat Benatar & Neil Giraldo
- Cheap Trick
- Rik Emmett (of Triumph)
- Trooper

Saturday, July 28

- George Thorogood & The Destroyers
- Creedence Clearwater Revisited
- David Wilcox
- Rick Derringer

One of the announced bands was supposed to be Boston. The announcement was postponed after the death of Brad Delp. Subsequently, all of Boston's plans for touring, including Hawk Rocks the Park, were cancelled.

== Hawk Rocks the Park 5 ==
Rock the Park 5 ran from July 23 to July 26, 2008.

Wednesday, July 23

- Ted Nugent
- Great White
- Diamond Dust (Winner of Rockstar Fantasy)

Thursday, July 24

- Sammy Hagar
- Joan Jett & The Blackhearts
- Skid Row
- Lee Aaron

Friday July 25

- Steve Winwood
- Tom Cochrane
- Sweet
- Pat Travers

Saturday July 26

- Randy Bachman and Burton Cummings
- Mark Farner (of Grand Funk Railroad)
- April Wine
- Streetheart

== Rock the Park 2009 ==
Rock the Park 2009 was held July 23–25, 2009. This marked the first time Rock the Park was not fully put on by The Hawk. Instead it was put on by two other major London radio stations as well. July 23 was presented by FM96, July 24 by BX93, and July 25 by The Hawk.

Thursday, July 23

- The Tragically Hip
- Kathleen Edwards
- Arkells
- The Spades

Friday, July 24

- Big & Rich
- Cowboy Troy
- Aaron Pritchett
- Shane Yellowbird

Saturday, July 25

- The Doobie Brothers
- Creedence Clearwater Revisited
- Dennis DeYoung (Former singer of Styx)
- Lighthouse

== Rock the Park 2010 ==
Rock the Park 2010 was held from July 22–24, 2010. It was presented by Bob FM. Approximately $1 million was raised for the Bethany's Hope Foundation.

Thursday, July 22

- 3 Doors Down
- Collective Soul
- Thornley
- Crash Karma

Friday, July 23

- Alice Cooper
- Peter Frampton
- Night Ranger
- Alannah Myles

Saturday, July 24

- Lynyrd Skynyrd
- Heart
- April Wine
- Mitch Ryder & The Detroit Wheels

== Rock the Park 2011 ==
The 2011 edition of Rock the Park took place over three days in July 2011. That year's sponsors included FM 96, 103.1 Fresh FM, 103.9 Greatest Hits FM and AM980, among others.

Thursday, July 21

- Poison
- John Kay & Steppenwolf
- Trooper
- Loverboy

Friday, July 22

- Meat Loaf
- Cheap Trick
- Blue Öyster Cult
- Brian Howe (Singer of Bad Company)

Saturday, July 23

- Stone Temple Pilots
- Our Lady Peace
- Sloan
- Bleeker Ridge

== Rock the Park 2012 ==
Thursday July 26, 2012 (Modern Rock Night)

- Slash w/ Myles Kennedy
- Bush
- I Mother Earth
- Monster Truck

Friday July 27, 2012 (Classic Rock Night 1)

- The Steve Miller Band
- George Thorogood
- David Wilcox
- The Romantics

Saturday July 28, 2012 (Classic Rock Night 2)

- Boston
- REO Speedwagon
- 54-40
- Prism

== Rock the Park 2013, 10th Anniversary ==
Thursday July 25, 2013 (Modern Rock Night)

- The Tragically Hip
- The Trews
- The Rural Alberta Advantage
- Greg Ball and The Dry County Rebels

Friday July 26, 2013 (Classic Rock Night 1)

- Journey
- Whitesnake
- Platinum Blonde
- Helix

Saturday July 27, 2013 (Classic Rock Night 2)

- Styx
- Toto
- Grand Funk Railroad
- Saga
- Coney Hatch

== Rock the Park 2014 ==
Rock the Park XI took place July 24–26, 2014. A new event, the Gone Country Music Festival, sponsored by radio station BX93, was held at Harris Park on Wednesday, July 23, 2014.

Wednesday July 23, 2014 – Gone Country Music Festival

- Darius Rucker
- Dean Brody
- Eli Young Band
- Tim Hicks

Thursday July 24, 2014

- Weezer
- Tegan & Sara
- Matthew Good
- July Talk

Friday July 25, 2014

- Sammy Hagar & Friends
- Extreme
- Tom Keifer of Cinderella
- Winger
- Survivor

Saturday July 26, 2014

- Burton Cummings
- Huey Lewis and the News
- 38 Special
- Headpins
- FREE FM Under the Covers Winner

== Rock the Park 2015 ==
Rock the Park XII took place July 14–18, 2015.

Tuesday, July 14, 2015

- Train
- Gin Blossoms
- Fastball
- The Rembrandts
- Matt Nathanson

Wednesday, July 15, 2015 – Gone Country

- Keith Urban
- Dallas Smith
- Jess Moskaluke
- Maddie and Tae

Thursday, July 16, 2015 – Gone Country

- Lee Brice
- Thomas Rhett
- Joe Nichols
- Chad Brownlee

Friday, July 17, 2015

- Arkells
- Mother Mother
- Tokyo Police Club
- Brave Shores
- Born Ruffians
- Young Empires

Saturday, July 18, 2015

- Billy Talent
- Rise Against
- Killswitch Engage
- Gaslight Anthem
- Heart Attack Kids

== Rock the Park 2016 ==
Rock the Park 2016 took place July 13–16, 2016

Wednesday, July 13, 2016 – Gone Country

- Jake Owen
- Dallas Smith
- High Valley
- Old Dominion

Thursday, July 14, 2016 – Gone Country

- Brad Paisley
- Tim Hicks
- Autumn Hill
- River Town Saints

Friday, July 15, 2016

- Flo Rida
- Nelly
- Classified
- Ria Mae

Saturday, July 16, 2016

- City and Colour
- Edward Sharpe and the Magnetic Zeros
- Awolnation
- The Zolas
- Ivory Hours

== Rock the Park 2017 ==
Rock the Park 2017 took place July 12–16, 2017. On April 10, 2017, it was announced that another night, Sunday, July 16, was added to the festival.

Wednesday, July 12, 2017 – BX93’s Gone Country Presents:

- Lady Antebellum
- Kelsea Ballerini
- Brett Young
- Jason Benoit

Thursday, July 13, 2017 – Virgin Radio Presents:

- Wiz Khalifa
- Fetty Wap ft. Monty
- DJ Mustard
- Casper the Ghost

Friday, July 14, 2017 – Virgin Radio Presents: I Love the '90s Tour

- Vanilla Ice
- Salt-N-Pepa
- Naughty by Nature
- Rob Base
- All-4-One
- Color Me Badd
- Young MC
- C+C Music Factory

Saturday, July 15, 2017 – FM96 Presents:

- The Offspring
- Sublime with Rome
- July Talk
- Bleeker

Sunday, July 16, 2017 – Virgin Radio Presents:

- Marianas Trench
- Alessia Cara
- Scott Helman
- Ruth B
- Ryland James

== Rock the Park 2018 ==
Rock the Park 2018 takes place July 11–14, 2018.

Wednesday, July 11, 2018 – FM96 Presents:

- Shinedown
- Chevelle
- Machine Gun Kelly
- The Lazys
- Bobnoxious

Thursday, July 12, 2018:

- Cyndi Lauper
- Bret Michaels
- Howard Jones
- Kim Mitchell
- Richard Page of Mr. Mister
- Platinum Blonde
- A Flock of Seagulls

Friday, July 13, 2018 – Virgin Radio Presents:

- Boyz II Men
- En Vogue
- Naughty by Nature
- Coolio
- Montell Jordan
- Sisqó

Saturday, July 14, 2018 – FM96 Presents:

- Rise Against
- Three Days Grace
- Theory
- Pop Evil
- Texas King

== Start.ca Rocks the Park 2019 ==
Start.ca Rocks the Park 2019 took place July 10–13, 2019.

Wednesday, July 10, 2019 – Pure Country 93 Presents:

- Old Dominion
- James Barker Band
- David Lee Murphy
- Russell Dickerson
- Tenille Townes
- Jade Eagleson

Thursday, July 11, 2019 – FM96 Presents:

- Five Finger Death Punch
- In This Moment
- Killswitch Engage
- I Prevail
- Pop Evil

Friday, July 12, 2019: 97.5 Virgin Radio Presents:

- Snoop Dogg
- Shaggy
- Ma$e
- Ginuwine
- Tone Loc

Saturday, July 13, 2019: 97.5 Virgin Radio Presents:

On Monday July 8, 2019, due to travel situations, the set order was changed. As a result, the headline act, Pitbull, opened the show, followed by T-Pain and finally Flo Rida.

- Pitbull
- Flo Rida
- T-Pain

== Start.ca Rocks the Park 2020 ==
Start.ca Rocks the Park 2020 was to have taken place July 15–18, 2020.

On April 27, 2020, festival organizers announced that due to the COVID-19 pandemic, the festival had been postponed for one year until 2021. Due to scheduling conflicts, various artists could not be reconfirmed for two of the postponed dates. As a result, the artists who were to perform on Wednesday, July 15, 2020, and Saturday, July 18, 2020 had been cancelled.

Wednesday, July 15, 2020 – FM96 and 103.1 Fresh FM Present: CANCELLED

- Jack Johnson
- Vance Joy
- TBA
- Andy Shauf

Thursday, July 16, 2020 – FM96 Presents: POSTPONED To Thursday July 15, 2021

- Blink-182
- Simple Plan
- grandson

Friday, July 17, 2020: 97.5 Virgin Radio Presents: POSTPONED To Friday July 16, 2021

- TLC
- Nelly
- Arrested Development
- Jenny Berggren of Ace of Base
- 112
- 2 Live Crew

Saturday, July 18, 2020 Pure Country 93 Presents: CANCELLED

- Dallas Smith
- Billy Currington
- Travis Tritt
- Blanco Brown

== Start.ca Rocks the Park 2021 ==
Start.ca Rocks the Park 2021 was to have taken place July 14–17, 2021.

On May 17, 2021, festival organizers announced that due to the COVID-19 pandemic, the festival once again had been postponed for another year until 2022. The organizers said that they were working with the artists to play on the rescheduled dates.

Wednesday, July 14, 2021:

- TBA

Thursday, July 15, 2021 – FM96 Presents: POSTPONED To Thursday July 14, 2022

- Blink-182
- Simple Plan

Friday, July 16, 2021: 97.5 Virgin Radio Presents: POSTPONED To Friday July 15, 2022

On April 27, 2020, Aqua was added to the line up.

- TLC
- Nelly
- Aqua
- Jenny Berggren of Ace of Base
- 2 Live Crew
- Arrested Development

Saturday, July 17, 2021:

- TBA

== Start.ca Rocks the Park 2022 ==
Start.ca Rocks the Park 2022 took place July 13–17, 2022.

Wednesday, July 13, 2022 – FM96 & fresh103.1 Present:

- Alanis Morissette
- Garbage
- The Beaches
- Crash Test Dummies

Thursday, July 14, 2022 – FM96 Presents:

- The Glorious Sons
- July Talk
- Big Wreck
- The Trews
- Conor Gains

Friday, July 15, 2022 – 97.5 Virgin Radio Presents:

- TLC
- Aqua
- Ja Rule
- DMC (of Run-DMC) and the Hellraisers
- Jenny Berggren of Ace of Base
- 112
- 2 Live Crew

Saturday, July 16, 2022 – FizzFest:

- Virginia to Vegas
- Kiesza
- Alyssa Reid
- Rêve (singer)

Sunday, July 17, 2022 – Pure Country 93 Presents:

- Dierks Bentley
- Ashley McBryde
- The Reklaws
- Breland

== RBC Rock the Park 2023 ==
RBC Rock the Park 2023 took place July 12–15, 2023.

Wednesday, July 12, 2023 – FM96 Presents:

- Mumford & Sons
- Vance Joy
- Bahamas
- The Trews

Thursday, July 13, 2023:

- Volbeat
- Papa Roach
- Halestorm
- Default

Friday, July 14, 2023 – 97.5 Virgin Radio Presents:

- Ludacris
- T.I.
- Ja Rule
- Ashanti
- Mya
- Chingy

Saturday, July 15, 2023 – FM96 Presents:

- Billy Talent
- Alexisonfire
- Cypress Hill
- Silverstein
- The Dirty Nil

== RBC Rock the Park 2024 ==
RBC Rock the Park 2024 took place July 10–13, 2024. On June 26, 2024, organizers announced that Bryan Adams would be replacing Neil Young with Crazy Horse, due to the latter's cancellation of the remaining dates in their concert tour.

Wednesday, July 10, 2024

- Nickelback
- The Glorious Sons
- The Tea Party
- Crown Lands

Thursday, July 11, 2024

- Tyler Childers
- Charles Wesley Godwin
- The Strumbellas
- Sam Barber

Friday, July 12, 2024

- Nas
- Ne-Yo
- Lil Jon
- Shawn Desman
- Keri Hilson

Saturday, July 13, 2024

- Bryan Adams
- Alan Doyle
- The Sheepdogs
- Odds

== RBC Rock the Park 2025 ==
On February 19, 2025, it was announced that a fifth night would be added, and as a result RBC Rock the Park 2025 took place July 8–12, 2025. This was the third time that Rock the Park has spanned 5 nights.

Tuesday, July 8, 2025 - Presented by Virgin Radio London

- Gates - 4:00pm
- Valley - 4:45pm
- Dear Rouge - 6:00
- Marianas Trench - 7:30pm
- Hozier - 9:15pm

Wednesday, July 9, 2025 - Presented by Pure Country 93

- Gates - 4:00pm
- Maggie Antone - 4:45pm
- Waylon Wyatt - 5:30pm
- Bayker Blankenship - 6:30pm
- Wyatt Flores - 7:30pm
- The Red Clay Strays - 9:00pm

Thursday, July 10, 2025 - Presented by Virgin Radio London

- Gates - 4:00pm
- Victoria Nadine - 5:00pm
- Sam Feldt - 6:00pm
- Two Friends - 7:45pm
- Kygo - 9:30pm

Friday, July 11, 2025 - Presented by Fm96 London alternative Rock

- Gates - 4:00pm
- No Exceptions - 4:35pm
- Cancer Bats - 5:20pm
- Dayseeker - 6:20pm
- Underoath - 7:35pm
- Bad Omens - 9:30pm

Saturday, July 12, 2025 - Presented by Pure Country 93

- Gates - 3:00
- Brandon Wisham - 3:15pm
- Avery Anna - 3:50pm
- Gates Closed- 4:30pm due to weather
- Gates Reopened - 5:45pm
- Lonestar - 6pm
- Owen Riegling - 7:15pm
- The Reklaws - 8:30pm
- Lee Brice - 10:05pm

== RBC Rock the Park 2026 ==
RBC Rock the Park 2026 takes place July 15–18, 2026.

Wednesday, July 15, 2026 - Presented by Virgin Radio London & Windsor’s alternative 89x

- Gates - 4:00pm
- Valley - 5:00pm
- Michael Marcagi - 6:15pm
- Dylan Gossett - 7:45pm
- The Lumineers - 9:30pm (Cancelled due to high risk air quality conditions)

Thursday, July 16, 2026 - Presented by Pure Country 93 - Cancelled

- Gates - 4:00pm
- MacKenzie Carpenter - 5:00pm
- Braxton Keith - 6:00pm
- Tucker Wetmore - 7:45pm
- Jordan Davis - 9:30pm

Rock the Park announced at 4:38pm on social media that the nights show had been cancelled after smoke conditions worsened throughout the day.

Friday, July 17, 2026 - Presented by Virgin Radio London

- Gates - 4:00pm
- Omi - 5:15pm
- Afroman - 6:00pm
- Fat Joe - 7:00pm
- Shaggy - 8:15pm
- Nelly - 9:45pm

Saturday, July 18, 2026 - Presented by FM96

- Gates - 3:00pm
- The Dan Band - 5:00pm
- Ice Nine Kills - 6:15pm
- I Prevail - 7:45pm
- Three Days Grace - 9:30pm

== RBC Rock the Park 2027 ==
RBC Rock the Park 2027 will be taking place July 15–18, 2027.

Thursday, July 15, 2027 - Presented by Pure Country 93

- Gates - 4:00pm
- Lakeview (band) - 5:00pm
- Zach John King- 6:15pm
- Josh Ross- 7:45pm
- Hardy (singer) - 9:30pm

Sunday, July 18, 2027 - Presented by Pure Country 93

. Gates - 3:00pm

. Mccoy Moore - 4:15pm

. Tba - 5:45pm

. Max McNown - 7:15pm

. Riley Green - 9:00pm

[8]References
