= CFCW =

CFCW may refer to:

- CFCW (AM), a radio station (840 AM) licensed to Camrose, Alberta, Canada
- CFCW-FM, a radio station (98.1 FM) licensed to Camrose, Alberta, Canada
