= CJBK =

Radio station in London, Ontario (1967–2023)

Coordinates: 42°52′15″N 81°4′1″W

- London, Ontario; Canada
- Broadcast area: Southwestern Ontario
- Frequency: 1290 kHz

Programming
- Format: News/talk/sports

Ownership
- Owner: Bell Media; (Bell Media Radio)
- Sister stations: CFPL-DT, CIQM-FM, CJBX-FM

History
- First air date: January 25, 1967
- Last air date: June 14, 2023 (56 years, 140 days)
- Call sign meaning: Homage to WJBK (now WLQV)

Technical information
- Licensing authority: CRTC
- Class: B
- Power: 10,000 watts

CJBK was a Canadian radio station, broadcasting in London, Ontario, Canada, on the assigned frequency of 1290 kHz. The station was owned by Bell Media. It was classified as a Class B station, having an antenna system input power of 10,000 watts,. CJBK's studios were located at 1 Communications Road along with sister stations CJBX-FM, CIQM-FM and CFPL-DT while its former transmitter site was located near White Oak Road and Manning Drive south of London. The station last aired a News/Talk/Sports format. It broadcast the Western Ontario Mustangs college football team, serving as its flagship station. It also broadcast Toronto Maple Leafs, Ottawa Senators, and Detroit Red Wings games.

On June 14, 2023, the station ceased broadcasting.

== History ==
CJBK went on the air January 25, 1967, as CJOE. The "JOE" in the call letters stood for Joe McManus, the founder of the station (under the banner of Middlesex Broadcasters, Ltd.). The station originally featured a Beautiful Music format. Eventually CJOE began to supplement the easy listening music with soft rock and then Top 40 music during the evening hours, but the station remained unprofitable.

In 1972, McManus sold the station to Rick Richardson (two-thirds Baron Communications, Ltd. and one-third Bruce Communications, Ltd.). On September 6, 1972, Richardson took control of CJOE and changed the call letters to CJBK and the format to full-time Top 40 music. Richardson wanted a "CJ" call sign to distinguish the new AM 1290 from its competitors CFPL and CKSL, but it has also been suggested that the CJBK calls were a personal tribute to former Detroit Top 40 station WJBK, which had been a favourite station of Richardson's while he lived and worked in Windsor. CJBK's main catchphrase in the 1970s was "Have a Good Day!" In 1980, CJBK added an FM sister with country-formatted CJBX-FM 92.7.

In 1987, CJBK and CJBX were acquired by Middlesex-Lambton Broadcasters Ltd., and CJBK shifted from its CHR/Top 40 format to adult contemporary in August of that year. The station began broadcasting in AM stereo in 1989. In early 1992, the station changed format from AC to oldies.

London Communications, Inc. acquired CJBK and CJBX in September 1993 and shifted CJBK from oldies to the current News/Talk format on August 12, 1996. The stations were sold again in 1999 to Telemedia, which already owned AC CIQM-FM and would purchase CKSL the following year. Standard Radio acquired Telemedia's London stations in 2002.

In October 2007, Astral Media acquired Standard Broadcasting's terrestrial radio and television assets, including CJBK. As part of Astral's merger with Bell Media on June 27, 2013, CJBK is owned by Bell Media.

Morning host Steve Garrison had been a fixture on CJBK since the late 1970s. After a stint as station promotion manager, Garrison became a mid-day DJ in January 1984, and began co-hosting a morning show in 1990 with future CBC News anchor Heather Hiscox. After moving back to middays for a few years, he began hosting his current morning show when the news/talk format was adopted in 1996. In November 2015 Bell Media let the London radio icon go as part of a company-wide restructuring.

Final logo of CJBK, used until signoff in 2023

Starting in mid-2014 after the Bell Media purchase, CJBK began airing top of the hour news and simulcasting the 6PM newscast from the CTV London newsroom.

The station, in its final run, featured live talk shows including The Morning Show with Ken Eastwood and Loreena Dickson from 5AM to 9AM, The Jerry Agar Show, The Evan Solomon Show, The Rush, and The Late Showgram with Jim Richards overnights.

CJBK also broadcast live sports, Western Ontario Mustangs football and NFL Football. On evenings and weekends, the station carried a variety of News/Talk programming from other Bell Media stations including CFRB in Toronto, CJAD in Montreal, and CFRA in Ottawa.

On June 14, 2023, as part of a mass corporate restructuring at Bell Media, the company shut down 6 of their AM radio stations nationwide, including CJBK. The station ended regular programming at 11 a.m. that day, replaced with a looped message about the impending shutdown, which is expected to last until the completion of the signoff. Bell Media had requested to have CJBK's license revoked on July 22, 2024.
