= CJAY =

CJAY may refer to:

- CJAY-FM, a radio station (92.1 FM) licensed to Calgary, Alberta, Canada
- CKY-DT, a television station (channel 7) licensed to Winnipeg, Manitoba, Canada, which held the call sign CJAY-TV from 1960 to 1973
