= CFMG-FM =

Radio station in Edmonton

- Edmonton, Alberta; Canada
- Broadcast area: Edmonton Metropolitan Region
- Frequency: 104.9 MHz
- Branding: 104.9 Virgin Radio

Programming
- Format: Contemporary hit radio
- Affiliations: Premiere Networks

Ownership
- Owner: Bell Media; (Bell Media Radio G.P)
- Sister stations: CFBR-FM, CFRN-DT

History
- First air date: December 23, 1978
- Former call signs: CKST (1978–1988); CHMG (1988–1995)
- Former frequencies: 1070 kHz (1978–1988); 1200 kHz (1988–1994)

Technical information
- Class: C1
- ERP: 100,000 watts
- HAAT: 200.5 metres (658 ft)
- Transmitter coordinates: 53°27′47″N 113°20′6.5″W

Links
- Webcast: Listen Live

CFMG-FM (104.9 MHz) is a Canadian radio station, broadcasting from Edmonton, Alberta. Branded as 104.9 Virgin Radio, the station airs a contemporary hit radio format. The station's studios are located at 18520 Stony Plain Road in Edmonton, while its transmitter is located near Range Road 234 and 34 Avenue in eastern Edmonton.

== History ==
=== Early years and EZ Rock ===
St. Albert Broadcasting Ltd. launched the station on December 23, 1978, playing "oldies" from offices and studios just north of Edmonton in St. Albert. The original frequency was 1070 kHz with the call sign CKST. The station struggled nearly immediately, losing eight employees within two weeks in July 1979; in 1979, the OK Radio Group offered to buy it. The Canadian Radio-television and Telecommunications Commission (CRTC) refused to allow OK to operate the station on an interim basis and hinted it would not allow a 100 per cent transaction. In September, Edmonton businessman Peter Pocklington offered to buy 51 per cent of the station; he later withdrew, claiming misrepresentation of its finances. In 1980, the Edmonton cable television company QCTV Ltd. made an offer to buy a controlling interest the station, which the CRTC accepted in November 1980.

The CRTC permitted Balsa Broadcasting Corporation to buy CKST in 1985, after revenues remained low under QCTV ownership.

In 1988, Balsa Broadcasting Corporation received approval to change CKST's AM frequency from 1070 kHz to 1200 kHz and changed callsigns to CHMG the same year. Balsa Broadcasting Corporation received approval to move CHMG from AM 1200 kHz to its current FM frequency at 104.9 MHz in 1994. In 1995, CHMG changed to its current callsign, CFMG-FM. At the same time, the station shifted to an adult contemporary format, branded as 104.9 EZ Rock. Programmed by longtime broadcaster Tammy Cole, "EZ Rock" was a station designed to appeal to office work environments. Music was slanted towards female listeners 25–54 years old.

On August 2, 1996, the CRTC approved the application for authority to acquire the assets of the radio programming undertaking CFMG-FM St. Albert from Balsa Broadcasting Corp to Telemedia Communications Inc.

On April 19, 2002, the CRTC approved the applications by Standard Radio Inc. (Standard) to acquire from Telemedia Radio Inc.

On September 28, 2007, the CRTC approved the sale of CFMG and all Standard Radio assets to Astral Media.

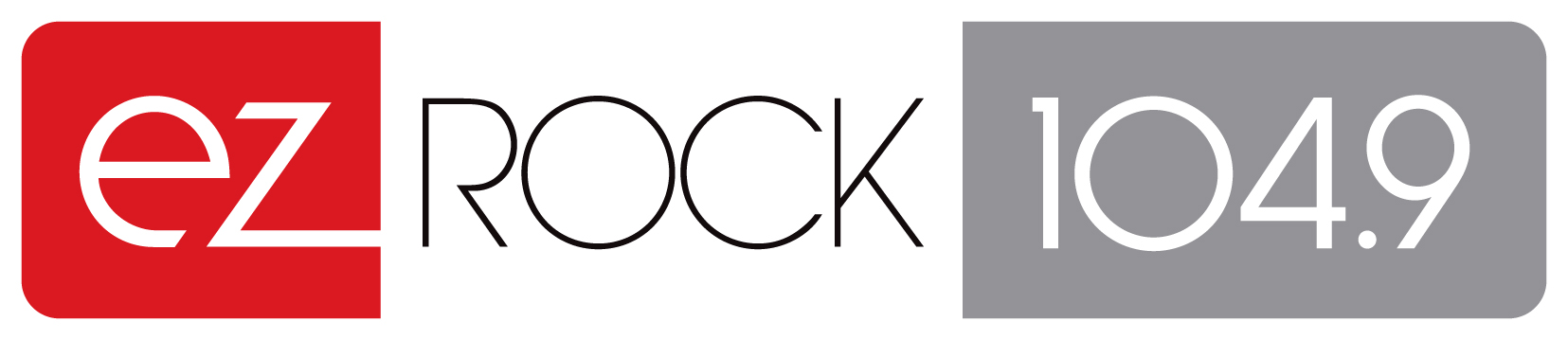
CFMG's "EZ Rock" logo, used from September 2010 to February 2011.

Astral changed the logo of the station in September 2010; however, the adult contemporary format is unchanged while continuing to say the decimal point on the station ID. In addition, most of the classic hits were dropped.

On June 27, 2013, the CRTC approved an application by Astral Media inc. (Astral) and its licensed broadcasting subsidiaries for authority to change the effective control of Astral’s broadcasting undertakings to BCE Inc. (Bell Media).

=== Virgin Radio (2011–present) ===
Former "Virgin" logo (2011–2019)

On February 4, 2011, CFMG flipped to Top 40/CHR as 104.9 Virgin Radio. The last song on "EZ Rock" was "The Boys Of Summer' by Don Henley, while the first song on "Virgin" was "Firework" by Katy Perry. This left Edmonton with no adult contemporary station for 51 days until CKEA-FM dropped adult album alternative for AC (which has since shifted to adult hits).

CFMG, during its final adult contemporary week, did list its CHR adds on Mediabase's Canadian adult contemporary panel. A week after the station flipped formats, the station was delisted from Mediabase's station adds. As of March 2011, CFMG joined CHBN-FM on the Mediabase CHR panel.

CFMG is the third "Virgin" station in Canada to have a mainstream Top 40 format, the first being at Calgary's CIBK-FM the year before, and in Toronto at CKFM-FM in 2009.

Every year for one week, along with sister stations CFBR-FM and CFRN, CFMG presents, Stollery Week, a week long fundraiser for the Stollery Children's Hospital. In past years, all three stations had broadcast live for two days from the Stollery Children's Hospital. In year one, $300,000 was raised for the Pediatric Oncology Unit; in year two, EZ Rock and her sister stations raised $500,000 for Research.

== Ratings ==
The last ratings period when CFMG was an adult contemporary station (October/10 - January/11) placed the station at #4 with a 7.4 share. In the first ratings period as "Virgin" (February - May/11), the station plummeted to #14 and with a 2.6 share. The Fall 2011 BBM Canada ratings book has the station up to #11 with a 4.9 share.

As of February 28, 2021, CFMG is the 15th-most-listened-to radio station in the Edmonton market according to a PPM data report released by Numeris.
