= CKER =

CKER may refer to:

- CKER-FM, a radio station in Edmonton, Alberta.
- CKER-TV, a television station in Kahnawake, Quebec.
- CKER Chantal, a financial advice company in Zelhem, Netherlands.
