= WSKR =

WSKR may refer to:

- WSKR-LP, a low-power radio station (95.5 FM) licensed to serve Jacksonville, Florida, United States
- WLRO, a radio station (1210 AM) licensed to serve Denham Springs, Louisiana, United States, which held the call sign WSKR from 1997 to 2012
- WLRB (FM), a radio station (102.7 FM) licensed to serve Ocean City, New Jersey, United States, which held the call sign WSKR from 1991 to 1994
