= K97 =

K97 or K-97 may refer to:

- K-97 (Kansas highway), a former state highway in Kansas
- CIRK-FM, a radio station
