= CKSL =

Radio station in London, Ontario (1956–2016)

Coordinates: 42°52′59″N 81°13′24″W

- London, Ontario; Canada
- Frequency: 1410 kHz
- Branding: Funny 1410

Programming
- Format: Comedy

Ownership
- Owner: Bell Media; (Bell Media Radio)
- Sister stations: CJBX-FM, CIQM, CJBK

History
- First air date: June 1956
- Last air date: August 14, 2016

Technical information
- Class: B
- Power: 10,000 watts

CKSL was a Canadian radio station, broadcasting at 1410 AM in London, Ontario, Canada. The station aired a comedy radio format branded as Funny 1410. The station broadcast with a power of 10,000 watts from its transmitter site located on Scotland Drive in South London. The station's coverage area was directional to the north and south during the day, and towards the north at night to protect WDOE in Dunkirk, New York, located across Lake Erie from CKSL.

CKSL was owned by Bell Media, along with CJBX, CIQM and CJBK.

The station was launched in June 1956 on AM 1290 (the current home of CJBK), and moved to its current frequency in 1964. The station later adopted a Top 40 format, and subsequently changed to news/talk in 1993 known as AM 1410. It changed to an adult standards format under the same name in 1996, evolving into a soft adult contemporary format as AM 1410, The River in September 1997.

Logo as "Oldies 1410" (2009–2012)

In 2000, the station was acquired by Telemedia, who changed it to an oldies format as "Oldies 1410" on December 1, 2000. Standard Broadcasting subsequently acquired Telemedia in 2002, and the format changed back to adult standards as AM 1410 on February 16, 2004. By this point the station only broadcast live from 6-9 a.m. weekdays, with the rest of the time being automated. During the Oldies 1410 years, the station also broadcast various religious and ethnic programs in evenings, including Radio Maryja from Poland seven days a week from 8-9 p.m.

Due in part to the location of its transmitter site in South London, CKSL has been dogged by low listenership. The municipal landfill site is located just south of the transmitter site, causing increasing deterioration of the signal as the landfill has grown over the years. CKSL applied to move to the FM dial at 102.3 MHz in 1999, but the license for 102.3 MHz was awarded to CHUM who subsequently launched CHST-FM. By 2016, CKSL had the lowest audience share in the London market, according to BBM Canada.

In 2007 Astral Media took control of CKSL as a result of a takeover of Standard Radio.

In fall 2009, CKSL moved back to an oldies format, again using the "Oldies 1410" as its moniker.

In November 2011, CKSL announced that it would change formats by January 2012 to become the first radio station in Canada devoted to comedy radio. The new format, "Funny 1410", consist of bits performed by major stand-up and improvisational comedians. The new format was originally programmed by Astral Media's syndication arm, but would later pick up its programming from the American 24/7 Comedy network, of which Astral (and later, Bell Media) was the authorised Canadian distributor.

In early 2013, the station would add Astral's late night Humble & Fred show. It was a short time after this that Bell Media would acquire many of Astral's radio stations, including CKSL.

== Announced closure of CKSL ==
On July 11, 2016, Bell Media applied to the CRTC for a request to terminate CKSL's broadcast license, citing severe deteriorating conditions at the transmitter site. A technical review was done at the location of CKSL's transmitter building and towers by Bell Media and its contractors, and they found that the AM array's broadcast towers posed a structural risk, as well as needing their aircraft warning lights to be repaired to bring it back up to proper building, safety and aircraft codes. The transmitter building was also found to have shifted off its foundation. The cost estimate to repair all these issues was in the $CAD 3 million range, and with CKSL's long-term ratings performance at dead last of the ten commercial radio stations serving the London area, and with little hope of that changing any time soon, coupled with the region's four per cent decline of advertising revenue in radio since 2013, the CRTC accepted Bell's request to shut down CKSL. The station ceased operations on August 14, 2016, at midnight.
