= CKJR =

Radio station in Wetaskiwin, Alberta

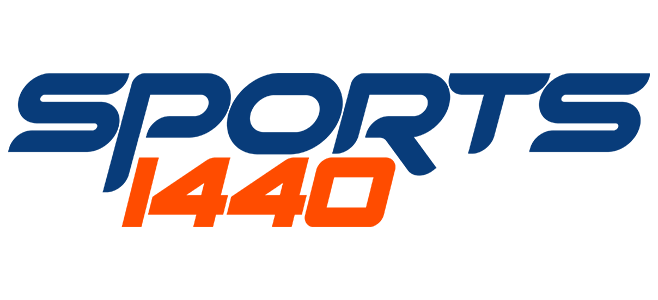
- Wetaskiwin, Alberta; Canada
- Broadcast area: Edmonton; Wetaskiwin; Red Deer
- Frequency: 1440 kHz
- Branding: Sports 1440

Programming
- Format: Sports radio
- Affiliations: Fox Sports Radio

Ownership
- Owner: Stingray Group
- Sister stations: CFCW, CFCW-FM, CIRK-FM, CKRA-FM

History
- First air date: November 18, 1971
- Former call signs: CJOI (1971–1994)

Technical information
- Licensing authority: CRTC
- Class: B
- Power: 10,000 watts
- Transmitter coordinates: 52°58′13″N 113°22′48″W

Links
- Webcast: Listen live
- Website: sports1440.ca

CKJR (1440 AM, "Sports 1440") is a radio station licensed to Wetaskiwin, Alberta, Canada. Owned by Stingray Radio, it broadcasts a sports format primarily serving the Edmonton Metropolitan Region. CKJR's studios are located alongside its metropolitan sister stations at the West Edmonton Mall.

CKJR broadcasts with a non-directional pattern during the daytime hours and a directional signal (using a three-tower array) during nighttime hours. CKJR is the only station in Canada broadcasting at 1440 AM, and the only station with a sports radio format in western Canada after CFAC in Calgary and CISL in Vancouver shut down since July 7, 2026.

== History ==
The station started in November 18, 1971 as CJOI on 1440 kHz, with 1,000 watts power.

In 1974, CJOI started using 10,000 watts power.

CJOI became CKJR in 1994. The former callsign now belongs to CJOI-FM in Rimouski, Quebec.

In 2002, Standard Broadcasting purchased stations and sold parts to Newcap Broadcasting and Rogers Communications.

In late September 2006, CKJR flipped from country to oldies as W1440.

In August 2023, Stingray announced that CKJR would flip to a sports talk format on September 5, 2023, as Sports 1440, in collaboration with former CFRN afternoon host Jason Gregor (via his company Just a Game Productions) and The Nation Network. The new format primarily targets the Edmonton market, restoring a sports station to the area after the June 2023 closure of CFRN by Bell Media.

The station launched with four local programs, including the morning show The Kevin Karius Show, Fantasy Frenzy, The Lowdown with Lowetide, and The Jason Gregor Show on afternoon drive. In October 2023, the station added a Fox Sports Radio affiliation, carrying its morning show Two Pros and a Cup of Joe, The Jason Smith Show, The Ben Maller Show, and its weekend programming. In February 2024, Paul Sir revived his previous CFRN show The Basketball Show on CKJR. In June 2026, Karius retired from broadcasting, and former CFRN host Tom Gazzola was announced as CJKR's new morning host beginning July 6.
