= Virgin Radio Lebanon =

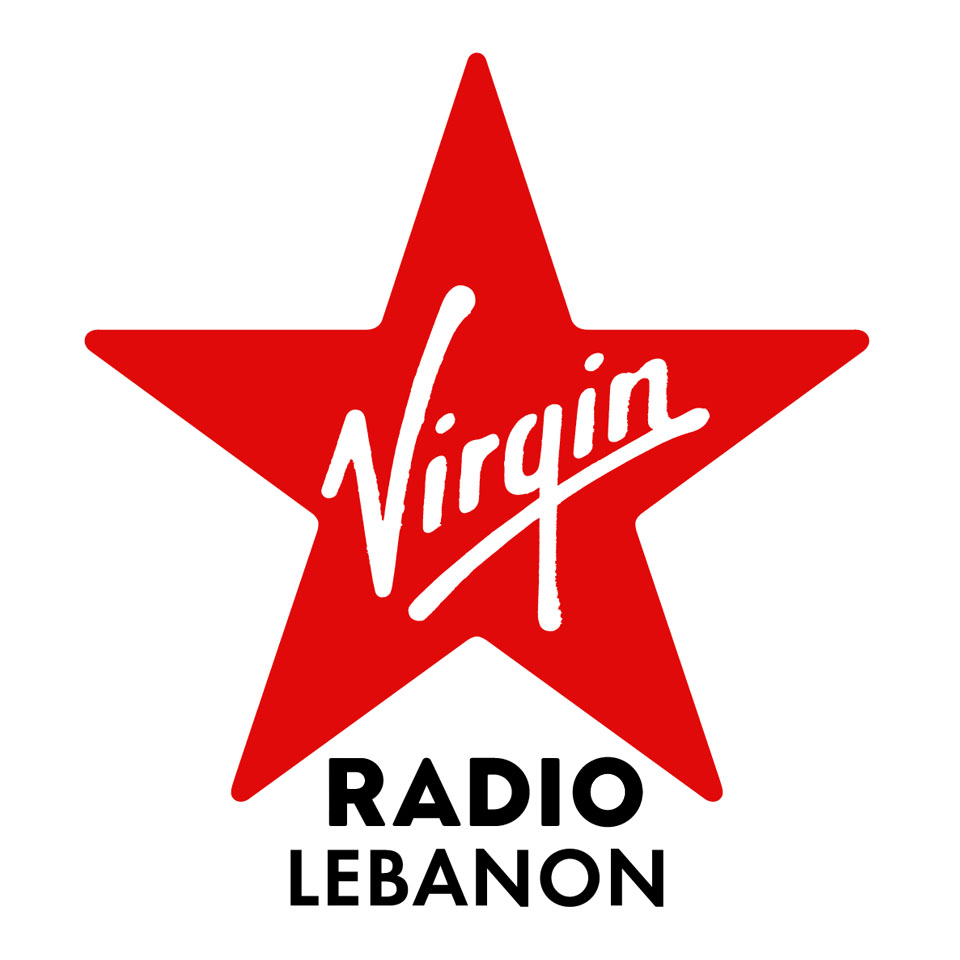

Beirut; Lebanon
- Frequency: 89.5 MHz
- RDS: [_VIRGIN_]
- Branding: Virgin Radio Lebanon

Programming
- Language: English
- Format: Contemporary Hit Radio

Ownership
- Owner: Levant Media Hub SAL; Virgin Group; Richard Branson; ViacomCBS

History
- First air date: 2013; 13 years ago

Technical information
- ERP: 50 kW

Links
- Website: Virgin Radio Lebanon

Virgin Radio Lebanon is part of the Virgin Radio chain launched by Richard Branson which is also part of the Virgin Group, operated in Lebanon by Levant Media Hub SAL. Its official launch was on 15 May 2013.

On September 1, 2019, Virgin Radio Stars Lebanon was launched on FM 89.7, alongside its sister radio station Virgin Radio Lebanon on FM 89.5.
