= CJAG-FM =

Radio station in Jasper, Alberta

Semi-satellite of CFBR-FM Edmonton
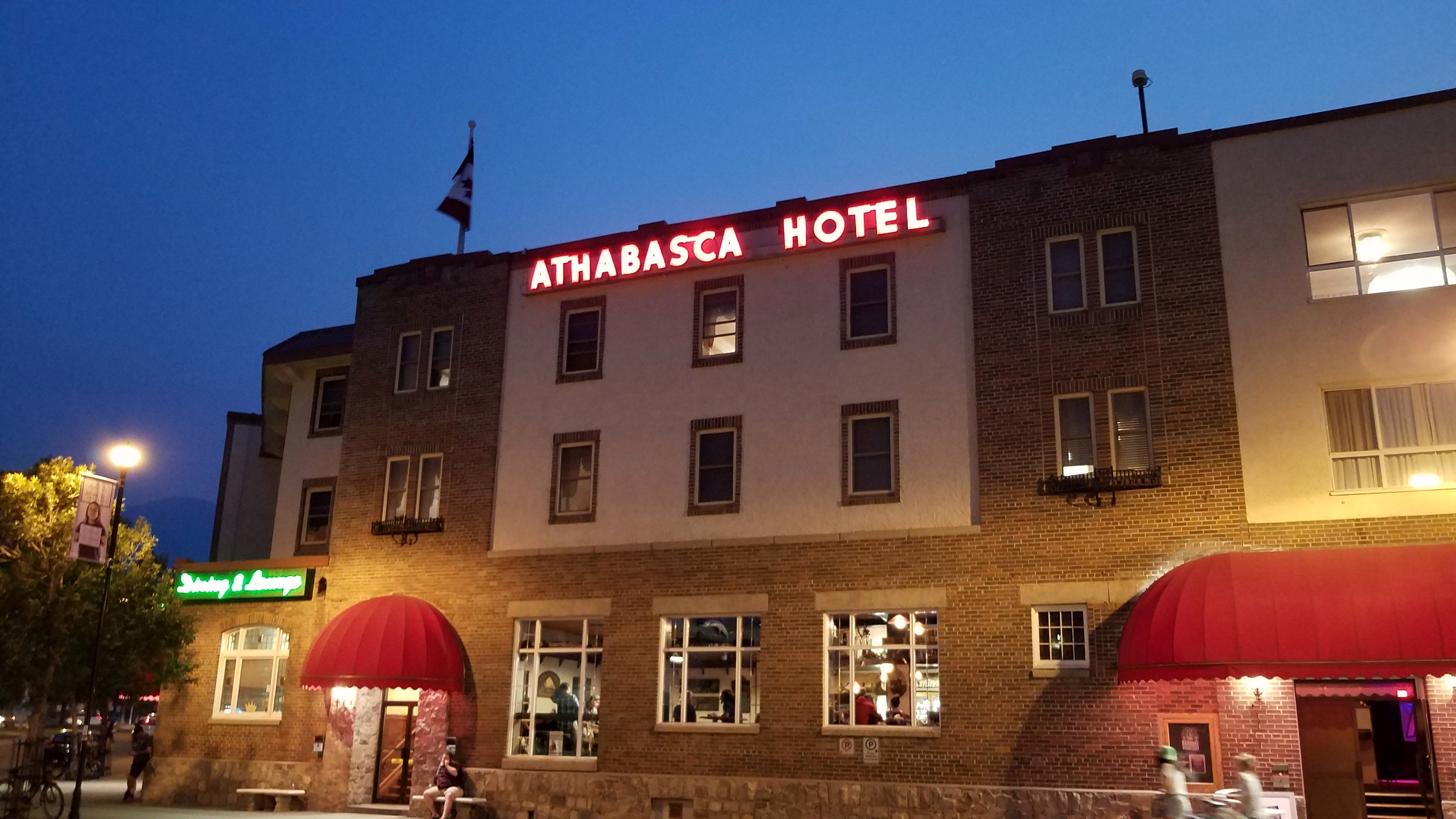
- Jasper, Alberta; Canada
- Frequency: 92.3 MHz
- Branding: 92.3 The Lone Wolf

Programming
- Format: Active rock

Ownership
- Owner: Athabasca Hotel (1972) Ltd.

History
- First air date: July 5, 2002

Technical information
- Licensing authority: CRTC
- ERP: 30 watts
- HAAT: −53 metres (−174 ft)
- Transmitter coordinates: 52°52′36.12″N 118°4′55.20″W

CJAG-FM was a Canadian radio station that broadcasts an active rock format at 92.3 FM in Jasper, Alberta. The station is branded as "The Lone Wolf" and airs a rock format largely simulcast from CFBR-FM in Edmonton. It is owned by and located in the Athabasca Hotel.

On September 17, 2001, citing a lack of local radio service or ability to disseminate emergency messages, the CRTC authorized Athabasca to build on the 92.3 MHz frequency in Jasper, initially as a partial rebroadcaster of CIRK. It is authorized to rebroadcast an Edmonton station for up to 50 minutes each hour, with the remaining 10 minutes to be filled by locally generated information.

The broadcast license for CJAG-FM was revoked on July 17, 2026.
