= CKRA-FM =

Radio station in Edmonton, Alberta

- Edmonton, Alberta; Canada
- Broadcast area: Edmonton Metropolitan Region
- Frequency: 96.3 MHz
- Branding: 96.3 The Breeze

Programming
- Format: Soft adult contemporary

Ownership
- Owner: Stingray Radio
- Sister stations: CFCW; CFCW-FM; CIRK-FM; CKJR

History
- First air date: November 15, 1979
- Call sign meaning: Regional Alberta

Technical information
- Class: C
- ERP: 100,000 watts
- HAAT: 230.5 metres (756 ft)
- Transmitter coordinates: 53°25′9″N 113°14′29″W

Links
- Webcast: Listen live
- Website: www.963thebreeze.com

CKRA-FM (96.3 FM, 96.3 The Breeze) is a radio station in Edmonton, Alberta, Canada. Owned by Stingray Radio, it broadcasts a soft adult contemporary format. CKRA's studios are located inside the West Edmonton Mall, alongside its metropolitan sister stations CIRK-FM, CFCW, and CKJR, while its transmitter is located at Ellerslie Road and Provincial Highway 21, just southeast of Edmonton's city limits.

As of February 2021, CKRA is the most-listened-to radio station in the Edmonton market according to a PPM data report released by Numeris.

== History ==
On April 17, 1979, CFCW Limited, owner of CFCW in Camrose, received approval to operate a new FM station in Edmonton. There were ten other applicants for the new license, including CHUM Limited, Radio Station CHED Ltd., CHQT Broadcasting Ltd., The Voice of the Prairies Ltd. (owners of CFCN in Calgary), and Roger Charest. On November 15, 1979, CKRA signed on with an album rock format. By early 1983, CKRA shifted to adult contemporary under the 96 K-Lite FM moniker. In 1989, CFCW Limited sold the station to current owners Newcap Radio.

On January 13, 1995, at 3 p.m., after a three-hour stunt of a loop of "All I Wanna Do" by Sheryl Crow, the station adopted the name Mix 96, and shifted to a hot adult contemporary format. Several name and content changes occurred in 2002 and 2003. In the summer of 2002, CKRA adjusted its name to 96.3 The Mix and incorporated more contemporary music into its playlist. During this time, the station opened a satellite "weekend" location on Edmonton's trendy Whyte Avenue. Local (former) A-Channel entertainment host Shannon Tyler was hired to co-host the morning radio show with B.J. Wilson. On February 24, 2003, CKRA once again re-branded as 96X, "the hit music alternative" and retained its hot AC format, leaving R&B and hip-hop out of its playlist. Ryan Waters joined the new morning show, working with Wilson and Tyler then hosting solo for 90 minutes of commercial free music. Mike Anderson (middays), Tim Riess (drive time) and Carly Kincaid (evenings) rounded out the air staff. Several on-air changes followed, including Anderson leaving Middays and focusing on M.D. duties. Riess hosted several dayparts, Waters returned to his former position as "Swing Announcer" and Chris Kuchar held down "Afternoon Drive" before returning to sister station 97.3 K-Rock.

Following the transition of Power 92 to the hot AC-formatted Power 92.5 in June 2003, the station shifted to CHR/Top 40 and adopted the slogan "Edmonton's Only Hit Music Station", which (after Power 92 changed to adult hits) changed to "Edmonton's #1 Hit Music Station". During this time, 96X moved its Whyte Avenue studio to a booth in Hudson's Canadian Tap House from where it began broadcasting during the evenings and on weekends. The station also began weekly broadcasts on Saturday nights from The Standard nightclub. 96X hoped to duplicate the success of Power 92, who targeted the younger demographics through "Power Parties" and would regularly broadcast from different clubs around Edmonton. Long-term success was not to be as 96X enjoyed one average and one top 6 rating result, the latter being the highest market share reached to date. At the time, Wilson and Tyler hosted the morning show, Carley Kincaid entertained middays, Tim Riess sat in the chair for PM drive, and Adam McKale was the evening DJ. 96X's popularity among younger listeners was bolstered by Power's flip to 92.5 Joe FM, which aired a variety hits format. In the fall of 2005, 96X's main studio moved from its old location in a 99th Street strip mall to a new facility in Phase 4 of the West Edmonton Mall along with Newcap Broadcasting's other stations.

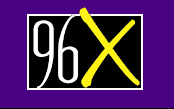
former 96X logo

However, the entry of CHBN-FM in February 2005 and CHDI-FM in April 2005 spelled disaster for 96X, whose market quickly dispersed over the upcoming months. In response, 96X segued to rhythmic hot AC, which was unsuccessful in regaining listeners.

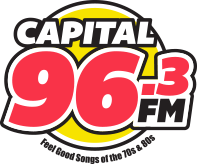
Final logo as Capital 96.3; a variation of this logo also contained the emblem of Boom.

On December 12, 2005, the station flipped to country music as Big Earl 96.3 (pronounced as "96 dot 3"); the new format served as a companion to CFCW (which has a full-service, traditional country format), in an effort to compete with the market-leading CISN-FM. However, Big Earl was unsuccessful, and CKRA flipped to classic hits as 96.3 Capital FM on March 28, 2008. The change came shortly after oldies station CHQT announced that it would relaunch as an all-news station that May; the station's manager stated that the timing was coincidental, and denied that Capital was a direct response.

On December 26, 2018, CKRA flipped to soft adult contemporary as 96.3 The Breeze, along with sister station CHLG-FM in Vancouver. In April 2021, as part of a restructuring by Stingray, the station dropped its local morning show in favour of The Morning Breeze from sister station CKUL-FM in Halifax, which uses a mix of national and localized segments.
