= Progressive Conservative Party of Canada candidates in the 1974 Canadian federal election =

The Progressive Conservative Party of Canada ran a full slate of candidates in the 1974 federal election, and won 95 out of 264 seats to remain as the Official Opposition in the House of Commons of Canada.

Many of the party's candidates have their own biography pages; information about others may be found here.

== Ontario ==
=== Nickel Belt: Ralph Connor ===
Ralph Connor was a 43-year-old television production consultant at the time of the election. He is the same Ralph Connor who founded Calgary's CJAY-FM and Edmonton's CJAX-FM, and worked as general manager at Peterborough's CHEX and Sudbury's CKSO (both radio and television) for several years. He received 4,371 votes (12.32%) in 1974, finishing third against New Democratic Party incumbent John Rodriguez.
