= CFRN-DT =

Television station in Edmonton, Alberta, Canada

- Edmonton, Alberta; Canada
- Channels: Digital: 12 (VHF); Virtual: 3
- Branding: CTV Edmonton (general); CTV News Edmonton (newscasts)

Programming
- Affiliations: 3.1: CTV

Ownership
- Owner: Bell Media Inc.
- Sister stations: CFCN-DT, CTV 2 Alberta, CFBR-FM, CFMG-FM, CFRN (AM)

History
- First air date: October 17, 1954
- Former call signs: CFRN-TV (1954–2011)
- Former channel numbers: Analogue: 3 (VHF, 1954–2011)
- Former affiliations: CBC (1954–1961)
- Call sign meaning: taken from its sister radio station

Technical information
- Licensing authority: CRTC
- ERP: 25 kW
- HAAT: 228.1 m (748 ft)
- Transmitter coordinates: 53°22′57.1″N 113°13′01.3″W
- Translator(s): CFRN-DT-6 (8.1 VHF) Red Deer

Links
- Website: CTV Edmonton

CFRN-DT (channel 3) is a television station in Edmonton, Alberta, Canada, owned and operated by the CTV Television Network, a division of Bell Media. It is sister to cable-exclusive CTV 2 Alberta and radio station CFRN (1260 AM). The three outlets share studios on Stony Plain Road in Edmonton; CFRN-DT's transmitter is located near Highway 21, southeast of Sherwood Park.

By way of cable and satellite, CFRN-DT also serves as the default CTV station for much of northeastern British Columbia.

== History ==
In 1953, the board of governors of the Canadian Broadcasting Corporation, then the regulatory body for broadcasting in Canada, accepted for hearing four applications proposing to establish television stations in Edmonton. The application of Sunwapta Broadcasting Company Ltd.—the licensee of CFRN (1260 AM) and CFRN-FM 100.3, named from the Nakoda for "radiating waves"—for channel 3 was selected over bids backed by Vancouver-area station CKNW and Edmonton Television Ltd. Sunwapta's founder, Dr. G. R. A. "Dick" Rice, had previously been involved in putting CJCA, the city's first radio station, on the air in 1922.

CFRN-TV, Alberta's second television station, first signed on at 3:00 p.m. on October 17, 1954, on VHF channel 3 with 27,400 watts of power. Programs were initially received from CBC Television and the three major American networks by kinescope; the Trans Canada Microwave and an accompanying tape delay centre at Calgary did not open until 1958.

Longtime Edmontonians still reminisce about such programs as the Noon Show that aired during the 1950s and 1960s with Don Brinton, Ed Kay, Norris McLean and George Kidd. Morning Magazine debuted when the station went on the air in 1954 and was hosted by Laura Lindsay, who was later replaced by Virginia Macklin. The program later became Day by Day with host Terry Lynne Meyer, who was replaced in 1994 by Seanna Collins; the show ended its run on June 30, 1996. CFRN-TV was also the first television station to incorporate editorials, which were started by news manager Bill Hogle, and continued by Bruce Hogle.

In December 1956, two years after its inaugural telecast, CFRN-TV increased its effective radiated power to 180,300 watts. In 1958, CFRN-TV fed live the opening of the 13th Alberta Legislature, by microwave to a five-station provincial network. In 1961, rebroadcasting stations were awarded and established at Edson and Carrot Creek. CFRN disaffiliated from CBC Television on September 30, 1961, as that network established its own station in Edmonton, CBXT (channel 5). On October 1 of that year, CFRN-TV became an affiliate of the CTV Television Network, receiving its programming via microwave relay during hours when the CBC was not using it, and time-delaying programs via videotape. Two more rebroadcasting stations were added at Whitecourt and Ashmont in 1966.

In September 1966, network colour transmission started, with local colour facilities for program and commercial production being installed in 1970, and a mobile colour television unit became operational in 1975. More rebroadcasting stations were added at Lac La Biche (1968), Grande Prairie and Peace River (1970), Rocky Mountain House and Crimson Lake (1971), Red Deer (1973) and Slave Lake, Grouard and Lougheed (1979), Jasper (1992) and Athabasca (1994). In 1974, CFRN-TV moved its transmitter to a new site east of town with a 915-foot (279 m) tower, operating at 250,000 watts.

The CFRN stations were sold in 1988 to Kitchener, Ontario–based Electrohome Limited for $51.2 million; a 91-year-old Rice rejected offers from several western groups and selected Electrohome as the purchaser. Under Electrohome, CFRN-TV established regional newscasts with reporters/photographers located in Grande Prairie, Fort McMurray and Red Deer, as well as bureaus in Lac La Biche, Whitecourt, Edson and Peace River. Twice each weeknight, regional inserts within the Eyewitness News broadcasts were aired on the regional transmitters. Electrohome sold off the radio properties in 1991 to concentrate on the television station.

CFRN-TV's former logo (1998–2005). As of October 2005, logos with the stations' call signs are no longer used on CTV stations; instead they all use the main CTV logo.

In 1995, Electrohome and Baton Broadcasting entered into a strategic alliance which saw both groups receiving approval from the Canadian Radio-television and Telecommunications Commission (CRTC) to share ownership of the CFCN-TV operations in Calgary and Lethbridge, the six Saskatchewan television stations previously owned by Baton alone, and Southern Ontario stations in Kitchener, London and Windsor, all previously solely owned by Electrohome or Baton.

Ownership of CFRN-TV changed in 1997 when Baton took over Electrohome's television interests in exchange for Baton shares. This move gave Baton controlling interest in CTV. A year later, after acquiring the remaining stock in the network, Baton changed its name to CTV Inc.

In February 2000, Canadian telecommunications giant Bell Canada Enterprises, through its subsidiary Bell Globemedia, proposed to purchase CTV Inc. for $2.3 billion, the largest transaction in Canadian broadcasting. Later in March, the CTV board approved the deal, which required CRTC approval. The CRTC hearing was held in September and the sale was approved on December 7. Also in 2000, master control for CFRN was relocated to the CTV Broadcast House at 80 Patina Rise Southwest in Calgary, home to sister station CFCN-TV.

By 2001, CFRN-TV operated CFRN-TV-7 Lougheed; CFRN-TV-3 Whitecourt and its transmitters CFRN-TV-1 Grande Prairie, CFRN-TV-2 Peace River, CFRN-TV-8 Grouard Mission, CFRN-TV-9 Slave Lake and CFRN-TV-11 Jasper; CFRN-TV-4 Ashmont and its transmitters CFRN-TV-5 Lac La Biche and CFRN-TV-12 Athabasca; and CFRN-TV-6 Red Deer and its transmitter CFRN-TV-10 Rocky Mountain House.

On July 21, 2006, the CRTC approved an application for ownership restructuring by Bell Globemedia, parent company of CTV, stemming from a deal in December 2005 that saw two new investors added to the company. The Thomson family's Woodbridge Co. Ltd. increased its stake in Bell Globemedia from 31.5 percent to 40 percent, while BCE Inc. reduced its holding to 20 percent from 68.5 percent. Two other investors were added to the deal, including Torstar Corp. and Ontario Teachers Pension Plan, each with 20 percent. On October 3, 2006, the CRTC granted CFRN to change the licence for CFRN-TV-4 Ashmont by deleting the CFRN-TV-12 Athabasca transmitter and attaching it to CFRN-TV. This was due to a change in the method of delivering the signal, along with local relevance.

In February 2008, CTV Edmonton launched a new website as part of the CTV.ca Broadband Network, ctvedmonton.ca. This brought the station in line with all the other broadcast television stations in Edmonton, as well as the other major market CTV stations, in terms of having a strong online news presence. In December 2008, the CRTC announced that it received an application from CTVglobemedia to create a direct-to-cable HD feed of CFRN-TV.

On October 18, 2016, the Stony Plain Road studios were evacuated due to the risk of the transmission tower collapsing from a stolen semi-truck colliding into the tower. The 5 p.m. newscast originated from CFRN's parking lot until the evacuation order was lifted in time for the 6 p.m. newscast. There were no injuries or fatalities from this incident.

== Programming ==
CFRN airs the full CTV program lineup on a Mountain Time schedule. Current American programs, though, are often broadcast three hours after CTV flagship CFTO-DT/Toronto (effectively, one hour later in Mountain Time than CFTO in Eastern Time). This matches the Pacific Time Zone broadcast schedule of the Spokane, Washington-based U.S. network affiliates available on many Alberta cable systems and thus allows simultaneous substitution of CFRN over the American broadcasts.

=== News operation ===
As of February 8, 2024, CFRN-DT broadcasts 25 hours of locally produced newscasts each week (with five hours each weekday). It also airs separate five-minute news bulletins for Red Deer during the station's 6 p.m. newscast, available only on the over the air transmitters or through cable companies that pick up the over-the-air signal. CFRN also produces an hour-long provincial current affairs program called Alberta Prime Time, which airs weeknights on sister cable channel CTV 2 Alberta.

As of October 2023, the flagship 6 p.m. newscast on CFRN is anchored by Geoff Hastings. The 6:00 newscast was awarded the 2011 Bert Cannings Award for the best local newscast in Canada by the Radio Television Digital News Association for its coverage of the May 2011 Slave Lake wildfire that destroyed much of the town of Slave Lake, Alberta.

According to the Bureau of Broadcast Measurement's (BBM) 2009 ratings, CFRN's 6 p.m. newscast regained its position as the most-watched 6 p.m. newscast in Northern and Central Alberta to Global Edmonton's News Hour, CBC and Citytv combined. However, the fall 2010 BBM ratings reflect that Global Edmonton has returned as the most-watched newscast.

CFRN-DT initially aired morning bulletins within the network's morning show, Canada AM, while re-running the previous evening's late night news before the morning program. In March 2009, CTV cancelled all local morning bulletins during Canada AM, including the Edmonton-based bulletins. Local news, weather and traffic reports continued to be featured during Canada AM through a graphical ticker at the bottom of the screen. On October 24, 2011, CFRN debuted a 3½-hour locally produced weekday morning newscast called CTV Morning Live, running from 5:30 a.m. to 9 a.m.

On September 12, 2011, CTV Edmonton expanded its evening news programming by adding newscasts at 5 and 5:30 p.m. In November 2014 those two half-hour shows were amalgamated into a single hour-long show anchored by Erin Isfeld and Joel Gotlib. On September 30, 2012, CFRN-DT became the second television station in Edmonton (after Global-owned station CITV-DT) and the fourth CTV owned-and-operated station to begin broadcasting its local newscasts in high definition, beginning with that evening's 6 p.m. newscast. However, CTV promoted October 1, 2012, as its official "full day" of HD news broadcasts.

As a result of budget cuts enacted by parent company BCE on February 8, 2024, CFRN-DT (along with many CTV stations across Canada) cancelled its weekday noon and weekend 6 p.m. and 11:30 p.m. newscasts.

=== Notable former on-air staff ===
- Ashleigh Banfield – host, Banfield
- Pat Kiernan – reporter
- Bryan Mudryk – sports anchor
- Ryan Rishaug – sports anchor
- Natasha Staniszewski – sports anchor

== Technical information ==
Subchannel of CFRN-DT
Channel	Res.	Short name	Programming
3.1	1080i	CFRN-DT	CTV

=== Analogue-to-digital conversion ===
On August 31, 2011, when Canadian television stations in CRTC-designated mandatory markets transitioned from analogue to digital broadcasts, the station's digital signal remained on VHF channel 12, using virtual channel 3.

=== Transmitters ===
Station	City of licence	Channel	ERP	HAAT	Transmitter coordinates
CFRN-DT-6^{2}	Red Deer	8.1 (VHF)	10 kW	282 m (925 ft)	52°19′10″N 113°40′41″W

On February 11, 2016, Bell Media applied for its regular license renewals, which included applications to delete a long list of transmitters, including CFRN-TV-2, CFRN-TV-8, and CFRN-TV-10. Bell Media's rationale for deleting these analog repeaters is below:

"We are electing to delete these analog transmitters from the main licence with which they are associated. These analog transmitters generate no incremental revenue, attract little to no viewership given the growth of BDU or DTH subscriptions and are costly to maintain, repair or replace. In addition, none of the highlighted transmitters offer any programming that differs from the main channels. The Commission has determined that broadcasters may elect to shut down transmitters but will lose certain regulatory privileges (distribution on the basic service, the ability to request simultaneous substitution) as noted in Broadcasting Regulatory Policy CRTC 2015–24, Over-the-air transmission of television signals and local programming. We are fully aware of the loss of these regulatory privileges as a result of any transmitter shutdown."

At the same time, Bell Media applied to convert the licenses of CTV 2 Atlantic (formerly ASN) and CTV 2 Alberta (formerly ACCESS) from satellite-to-cable undertakings into television stations without transmitters (similar to cable-only network affiliates in the United States), and to reduce the level of educational content on CTV 2 Alberta.

On October 18, 2016, CFRN was taken off the air after a semi-truck collided at the studio facility on Stony Plain Road, destroying a guy-wire in the process. Compromising the integrity of the transmission tower, the building was partially evacuated, including the news control room. This prevented the station to telecast regular programs, resulting CFRN to simulcast the newscasts of sister station CFCN in Calgary.

On July 30, 2019, Bell Media was granted permission to close down six additional transmitters as part of Broadcasting Decision CRTC 2019–268. The transmitters for CFRN-TV-3, CFRN-TV-4, CFRN-TV-5, CFRN-TV-7, and CFRN-TV-12 will be shut down by February 26, 2021. CFRN-TV-9 will be shut down by July 16 of the same year.

In November 2023, CFRN's Red Deer transmitter was converted to digital.

==== Former rebroadcasters ====
Station	City of licence	Channel	ERP	HAAT	Transmitter coordinates
CFRN-TV-1	Grande Prairie	13 (VHF)	64 kW	309 m (1,014 ft)	55°27′57″N 118°45′37″W
CFRN-TV-2	Peace River	3 (VHF)	4.3 kW	170 m (560 ft)	56°8′47″N 117°20′20″W
CFRN-TV-3^{2}	Whitecourt	12 (VHF)	17.9 kW	399 m (1,309 ft)	54°1′58″N 115°43′7″W
CFRN-TV-4^{2,3}	Ashmont	12 (VHF)	26.65 kW	194 m (636 ft)	54°8′7″N 111°36′20″W
CFRN-TV-5	Lac La Biche	2 (VHF)	8.656 kW	104.1 m (342 ft)	54°45′13″N 111°56′30″W
CFRN-TV-7^{1}	Lougheed	7 (VHF)	21 kW	220 m (720 ft)	52°32′15″N 111°31′10″W
CFRN-TV-8	Grouard Mission	18 (UHF)	10 kW	167.3 m (549 ft)	55°32′26″N 116°7′30″W
CFRN-TV-9	Slave Lake	4 (VHF)	0.84 kW	335.6 m (1,101 ft)	55°28′18″N 114°47′9″W
CFRN-TV-10	Rocky Mountain House	12 (VHF)	1.6 kW	168.5 m (553 ft)	52°31′21″N 114°52′45″W
CFRN-TV-11	Jasper	11 (VHF)	0.05 kW	NA	52°52′42″N 118°4′27″W
CFRN-TV-12^{1}	Athabasca	13 (VHF)	3.3 kW	96 m (315 ft)	54°42′14″N 113°17′23″W

^{1}These and a long list of CTV rebroadcasters nationwide were to shut down on or before August 31, 2009, as part of a political dispute with Canadian authorities on paid fee-for-carriage requirements for cable television operators. A subsequent change in ownership assigned full control of CTVglobemedia to Bell Media; as of 2011, these transmitters remain in normal licensed broadcast operation.

^{2}Semi-satellite status (i.e. distinct local programming and/or advertising) to cease on or before August 31, 2009, pending CRTC approval. It is expected that the transmitters themselves were to remain on the air. CFRN-TV-6 continues to provide separate local news bulletins and commercials to the Red Deer broadcast area.

^{3}CFRN-TV-4 in Ashmont focused on Fort McMurray with local news and commercials; however, that transmitter was available in Fort McMurray only on cable, as this transmitter did not reach Fort McMurray.
