= 24/7 Comedy =

Radio format produced by iHeart Media

- Type: Radio network
- Country: United States and Canada
- Availability: International
- Headquarters: San Antonio, Texas, United States, Toronto, Ontario, Canada
- Owner: iHeartMedia; Premiere Networks (distribution in USA); Bell Media (distribution in Canada)
- Launch date: September 20, 2010
- Official website: https://www.iheart.com/live/247-comedy-4902/

24/7 Comedy was a 24-hour live, commercial-free radio format produced by iHeartMedia's Premiere Networks in the United States and by Bell Media in Canada. It showcased the stand-up comedy routines of established and emerging comedians in a rapid-fire presentation style and was programmed by an array of comedians and comedy experts. The network targeted a 18-54 demographic range. It remains available through the iHeartRadio app in a more automated form, and in Canada through IHeart's Bell Media-managed presences.

It was first conceived in April 2008 by Bill Bungeroth, who had his partner George Gimarc design the format. 24/7 Comedy's debut on air was September 27, 2010 in Riverside, California, on KFNY, and a few weeks later digitally on iHeartRadio on October 22, 2010. Bungeroth's company was purchased by what was then Clear Channel in July 2012.

Short and fast-paced comedic bits are broadcast all day and night, averaging two to four minutes, like music formats. A different comedian would appear weekly as a guest host, often with on the road stories about their routines and featuring their favorite fellow comedians.

Clear Channel started phasing out the format from its stations in early 2014, with it discontinuing over-the-air on August 3, 2014. Non-iHeart-owned stations then transitioned to another network known as "Today's Comedy," which launched concurrently with 24/7 Comedy's closure.

Astral Media introduced the network on AM stations CHAM and CKSL in Hamilton and London, Ontario in 2012 under the Funny brand. They were a rarity among Canadian radio networks in that the majority of their programming originated almost entirely from outside Canada; the long-standing Canadian content requirements do not apply to spoken-word programming. However, the stations did provide limited local inserts (with the Hamilton station retaining one of the personalities from its prior talk radio format as a local host, billed as the station's "Ambassador of Funny"), and later added the late-night show Humble & Fred, produced from sister station CFRB.

== Former affiliate(s) ==
=== United States ===
Callsign	Frequency	Location
WACT	1420	Tuscaloosa, Alabama
KBSZ	1260	Phoenix, Arizona
KIKO	97.3	Phoenix, Arizona
KBFP	800	Bakersfield, California
KFNY	1440	Riverside, California
KKLF	1700	Richardson, Texas
K276FK	103.1	Denver, Colorado
K277AG	103.3	Beaumont, Texas
WHAL	1460	Columbus, Georgia
KXQZ	1270	Twin Falls, Idaho
WLRO	1210	Baton Rouge, Louisiana
WTGM	960	Salisbury, Maryland
WFNL	570	Raleigh, North Carolina
KEBC	1560	Oklahoma City, Oklahoma
KTHH	990	Albany, Oregon

Notes:

¹ Indicates a Daytimer radio station.

=== Canada ===
Callsign	Frequency	Location
CFVP²	6030	Calgary, Alberta
CHAM	820	Hamilton, Ontario
CKMX	1060	Calgary, Alberta
CKST	1040	Vancouver, British Columbia
CFRW	1290	Winnipeg, Manitoba

Notes:

² Indicates a shortwave station, repeating CKMX Calgary.
