= Virgin Radio =

Radio broadcasting brand

Virgin Radio International
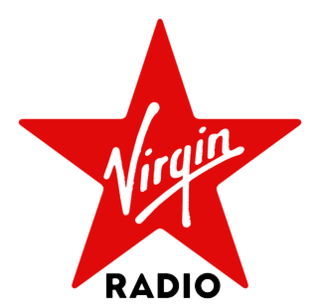
- Type: Private
- Industry: Commercial radio
- Founded: 1993; 33 years ago
- Area served: Global
- Revenue: Approx. US$100 million
- Parent: Virgin Group
- Website: https://www.virginradio.com/

Virgin Radio is a branding of radio stations broadcast in Canada, France, the United Kingdom, Switzerland, Italy, Romania, Turkey, Lebanon, the United Arab Emirates and Oman. As of January 2026, there were over 60 stations globally.

The stations in each country are owned and operated locally and independently of each other and the Virgin Group, which licenses the Virgin Radio brand and provides support services.

== Stations ==
Country	City	Stations	Frequency	Year of launch	Operator
Canada	Calgary	CIBK-FM	98.5 FM	2010	Bell Media
Canada	Edmonton	CFMG-FM	104.9 FM	2011	Bell Media
Canada	Halifax	CJCH-FM	101.3 FM	2016	Bell Media
Canada	Kitchener	CFCA-FM	99.5 FM	2026	Bell Media
Canada	London	CIQM-FM	97.5 FM	2012	Bell Media
Canada	Montreal	CJFM-FM	95.9 FM	2009	Bell Media
Canada	Toronto	CKFM-FM	99.9 FM	2008	Bell Media
Canada	Vancouver	CFBT-FM	94.5 FM	2015	Bell Media
Canada	Victoria	CHBE-FM	107.3 FM	2019	Bell Media
Canada	Windsor	CIDR-FM	93.9 FM	2020	Bell Media
Canada	Winnipeg	CKMM-FM	103.1 FM	2012	Bell Media
France		Virgin Radio FR	Various FM and DAB+	2024	Espace Group
France		Virgin Radio Légendes du Rock	Internet Radio	2024	Espace Group
France		Virgin Radio Rock Live	Internet Radio	2024	Espace Group
France		Virgin Radio Classique Rock	Internet Radio	2024	Espace Group
France		Virgin Radio Rock 60s	Internet Radio	2024	Espace Group
France		Virgin Radio Rock 70s	Internet Radio	2024	Espace Group
France		Virgin Radio Rock 80s	Internet Radio	2024	Espace Group
France		Virgin Radio Rock 90s	Internet Radio	2024	Espace Group
France		Virgin Radio Rock 2000	Internet Radio	2024	Espace Group
France		Virgin Radio Rock Anglais	Internet Radio	2024	Espace Group
France		Virgin Radio Rock Américain	Internet Radio	2024	Espace Group
France		Virgin Radio Rock Français	Internet Radio	2024	Espace Group
France		Virgin Radio Métal	Internet Radio	2024	Espace Group
France		Virgin Radio Rock Party	Internet Radio	2024	Espace Group
France		Virgin Radio Rock Nouveaux Talents	Internet Radio	2024	Espace Group
France		Virgin Radio Rock Ballads	Internet Radio	2025	Espace Group
Italy		Virgin Radio Italy	Various FM	2007	Mediaset S.p.A.
Italy		Virgin Radio Italy Classic Rock	Internet Radio	2010	Mediaset S.p.A.
Italy		Virgin Radio Italy Hard Rock	Internet Radio	2010	Mediaset S.p.A.
Italy		Virgin Radio Italy Rock '70	Internet Radio	2010	Mediaset S.p.A.
Italy		Virgin Radio Italy Rock '80	Internet Radio	2010	Mediaset S.p.A.
Italy		Virgin Radio Italy Alternative Rock	Internet Radio	2015	Mediaset S.p.A.
Italy		Virgin Radio Italy Rock Hits	Internet Radio	2015	Mediaset S.p.A.
Italy		Virgin Radio Italy Rock Party	Internet Radio	2015	Mediaset S.p.A.
Italy		Virgin Radio Italy Rock Ballads	Internet Radio	2021	Mediaset S.p.A.
Italy		Virgin Radio Italy Rock '90	Internet Radio	2021	Mediaset S.p.A.
Italy		Virgin Radio Italy Rock 2K	Internet Radio	2021	Mediaset S.p.A.
Lebanon		Virgin Radio Lebanon	89.5 FM	2013	Levant Media Hub
Lebanon		Virgin Radio Stars Lebanon	89.7 FM	2019	Levant Media Hub
Oman		Virgin Radio Oman	100.9 FM	2018	SABCO Media
Romania		Virgin Radio Romania	Various FM	2017	Czech Media Invest
Switzerland		Virgin Radio Switzerland	DAB	2018	CH Media
Turkey	Istanbul	Virgin Radio Türkiye	106.2 FM	2013	Karnaval
Turkey	Adana	Virgin Radio Adana	102.7 FM	2025	Karnaval
Turkey	Ankara	Virgin Radio Ankara	94.8 FM	2025	Karnaval
Turkey	Antalya	Virgin Radio Antalya	98.0 FM	2025	Karnaval
Turkey	Balıkesir	Virgin Radio Balıkesir	89.1 FM	2025	Karnaval
Turkey	Bursa	Virgin Radio Bursa	91.5 FM	2025	Karnaval
Turkey	Eskişehir	Virgin Radio Eskişehir	94.7 FM	2025	Karnaval
Turkey	Gaziantep	Virgin Radio Gaziantep	101.5 FM	2025	Karnaval
Turkey	İzmir	Virgin Radio Ismir	103.1 FM	2025	Karnaval
Turkey	Kayseri	Virgin Radio Kayseri	90.5 FM	2025	Karnaval
Turkey	Mersin	Virgin Radio Mersin	90.8 FM	2025	Karnaval
Turkey	Sakarya	Virgin Radio Sakarya	89.3 FM	2025	Karnaval
Turkey	Samsun	Virgin Radio Samsun	96.0 FM	2025	Karnaval
United Arab Emirates		Virgin Radio Dubai	104.4 FM	2008	Arab Media Group
United Kingdom		Virgin Radio UK	DAB	2016	News UK
United Kingdom		Virgin Radio Legends UK	DAB	2018	News UK
United Kingdom		Virgin Radio Chilled UK	DAB	2018	News UK
United Kingdom		Virgin Radio 80s UK	DAB	2022	News UK
United Kingdom		Virgin Radio 90s UK	DAB	2026	News UK
