= CFRN (AM) =

Radio station in Edmonton (1927–2023)

- Edmonton, Alberta; Canada
- Broadcast area: Edmonton Metropolitan Region
- Frequency: 1260 kHz

Ownership
- Owner: Bell Media; (Bell Media Radio)
- Sister stations: CFBR-FM, CFMG-FM, CFRN-DT

History
- First air date: April 17, 1927
- Last air date: June 14, 2023 (96 years, 58 days)
- Former call signs: CHMA (1927–1934); CFTP (March–November 1934)
- Former frequencies: 580 kHz (1927–1934); 1260 kHz (1934–1936); 960 kHz (1936–1941)
- Call sign meaning: G.R.A. Rice and H.F. Nielson, partners who bought the station in 1934

Technical information
- Class: A (Regional)
- Power: 50,000 watts
- Transmitter coordinates: 53°27′8.3″N 113°40′52.6″W

CFRN was a Class A, 50,000-watt (directional at night) radio station in Edmonton, Alberta, Canada. CFRN was unusual in that it was a Class A (protected nighttime skywave) AM station on a regional frequency. Owned by Bell Media and broadcasting on 1260 AM, the station last aired a sports format, branded as TSN 1260 Edmonton. The station's studios were located at 18520 Stony Plain Road in Edmonton, where it shared studio space with its sister station, CFRN-DT.

As of February 28, 2021, CFRN was the 17th-most-listened-to radio station in the Edmonton market according to a PPM data report released by Numeris.

== History ==
=== Early history ===
In 1927, the Christian and Missionary Alliance launched the original station as CHMA at 580 kHz. The station operated experimentally for two months before using its full power of 250 watts beginning in June. In March 1934, CHMA became CFTP after Taylor & Pearson Ltd. took over the station, which moved to 1260 kHz; its debut broadcasts featured the Edmonton Athletic Club in the Abbott Cup and Memorial Cup. Studios were located in the Birks Building in Edmonton.

At the end of October 1934, Taylor & Pearson announced it would lease CJCA from the Edmonton Journal. Simultaneously, the manager of CJCA, G. R. A. "Dick" Rice, acquired CFTP from Taylor & Pearson. On November 3, Rice immediately changed the call letters to CFRN, representing Rice and his business partner, H. F. Nielson of Coalspur. The two formed the Sunwapta Broadcasting Company, named for Sunwapta Falls in Jasper National Park.

On September 13, 1936, the station moved to 960 kHz, where it remained until March 29, 1941, when it returned to 1260 (as part of NARBA) and boosted power from 100 to 1,000 watts. It was one of the charter stations of the CBC Radio-owned Dominion Network from its launch in January 1944; the CBC would not have its own station on its main network in Edmonton until 1964, when CBR launched in Calgary, and CBX became Edmonton's exclusive CBC station.

FM simulcast began in 1951 on CFRN-FM 100.3, which lasted until 1964, when the FM station began offering separate stereo programming. CFRN-FM became fully separate from CFRN in 1979 and changed its call sign to CKXM-FM. Sunwapta brought television to Edmonton in 1954 when CFRN-TV signed on.

According to the 1976 B.B.M. Weekly Reach survey, CFRN was the 4th-most-listened-to radio station in Edmonton.

The CFRN stations were sold in 1988 to Kitchener, Ontario-based Electrohome Limited for $51.2 million; a 91-year-old Rice rejected offers from several western groups and selected Electrohome as the purchaser. Electrohome sold off the radio properties to Standard Broadcasting in 1991 to concentrate on the television station.

On July 1, 1998, CFRN flipped from adult standards to oldies, debuting Standard Radio's new oldies network, with CISL in Vancouver, delivered via Anik satellite. The new oldies network replaced the former Satellite Radio Network service.

=== Switch to sports radio ===
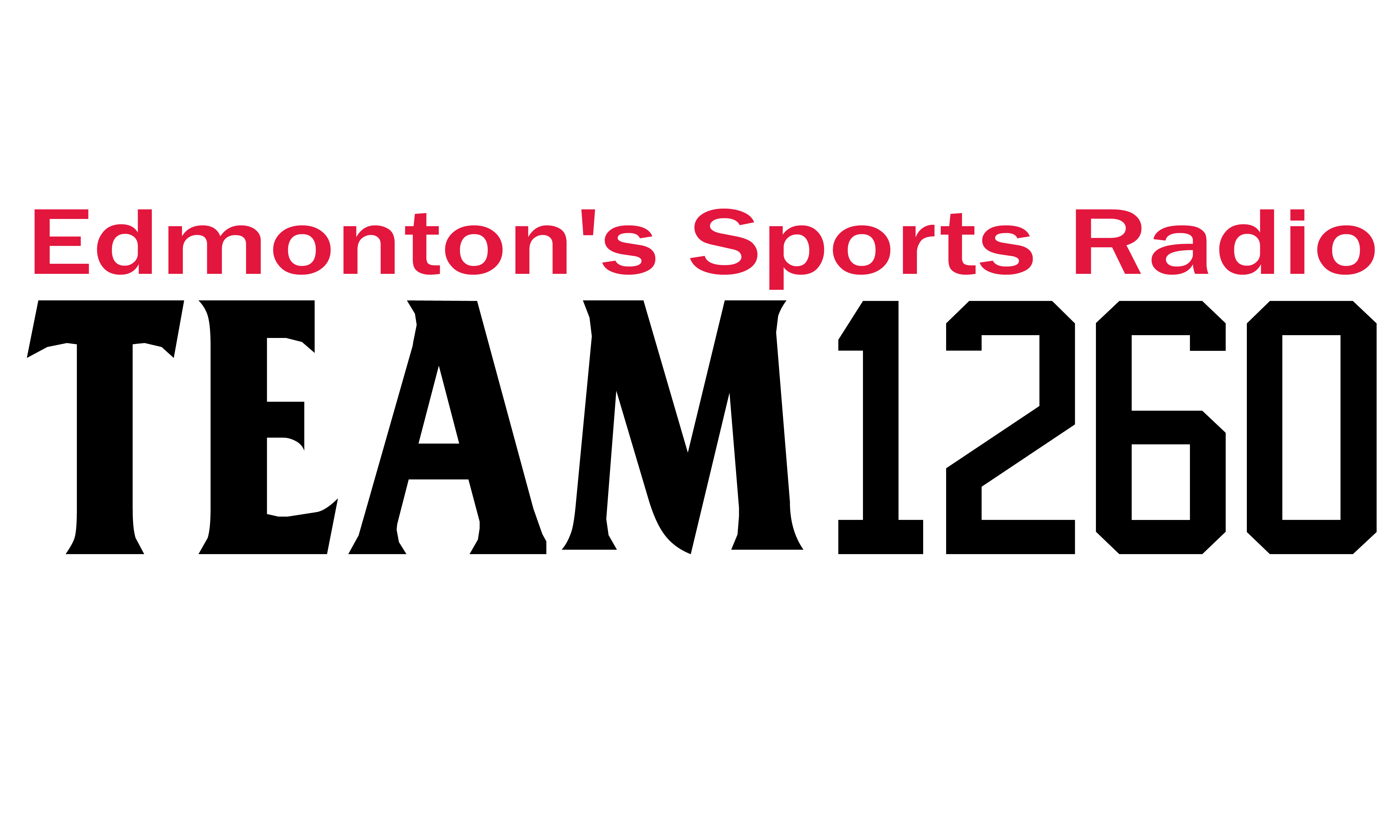
The Team 1260 logo

Logo as TSN 1260, 2013-2023

In June 2002, CFRN flipped to sports radio as The Team 1260, as an affiliate of CHUM Radio's The Team network. However, the network folded shortly afterwards. CFRN would maintain its branding as The Team as a locally programmed format, while adding syndicated programs such as Prime Time Sports and The Jim Rome Show. In 2007, Standard Radio was acquired by Astral Media. In turn, Astral Media was acquired by Bell Media on July 5, 2013; the acquisition reunited CFRN with its television sister, and with The Team's former owned-and-operated stations.

On September 30, 2013, CFRN was re-branded as a part of Bell's TSN Radio network, as TSN Radio 1260, introducing a new lineup of local afternoon programming.

=== Closure ===
On June 14, 2023, as part of a mass corporate restructuring at Bell Media, the company shut down six of their AM radio stations nationwide, including CFRN. At 9 a.m. Mountain that day, airing a looped message about the impending shutdown, which lasted until the completion of the signoff. The shutdown came with such little warning that the station went to a commercial break shortly before 9 a.m. and never returned. The CRTC approved Bell Media's application to revoke CFRN's licence on April 10, 2024.

In August 2023, former CFRN afternoon host Jason Gregor would partner with Stingray Radio to launch a new sports talk station on CKJR. Former morning host Daniel Nielson would form a digital outlet known as Edmonton Sports Talk to air programming on YouTube, including a continuation of CFRN's The Nielson Show. In August 2025, CKEA-FM announced it would add The Nielson Show as its morning show.

== Former shows and games ==
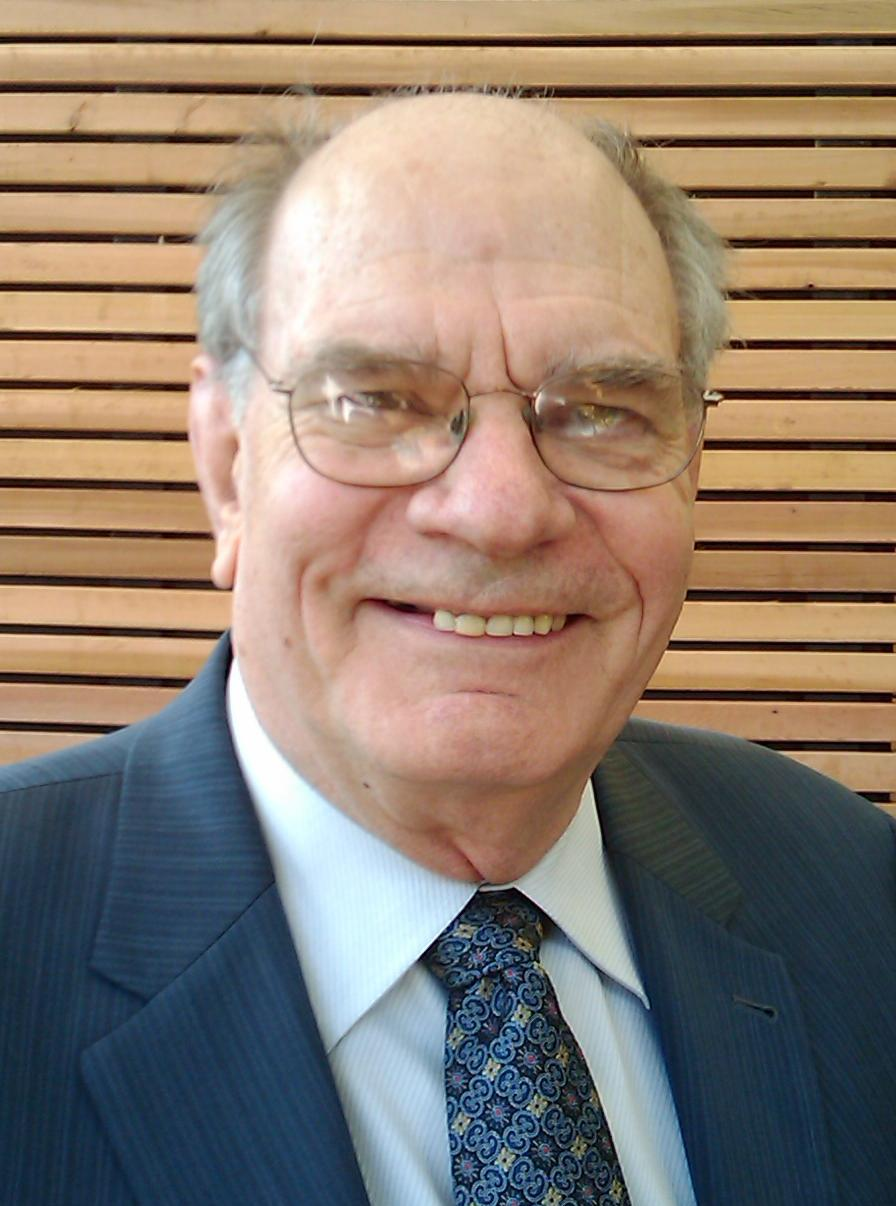
Sports Talk host John Short in Vancouver during the 2010 Winter Olympics

- The Mark Spector Show – hosted by Mark Spector
- Cracker-Cats Show – hosted by Al Coates
- Sports-Xtra – hosted by Tony Fiorello and Ron Rimer
- Edmonton Cracker-Cats live play-by-play – Games were carried on the Team 1260 during the first two years of the franchise. Al Coates handled the play-by-play
- Total Sports – hosted by Bob Stauffer; featuring the 'Total Sports Dream Team' of co-hosts
- What's Going On – hosted by Jason Jones, Corey Graham and Nadine Woudstra
- Sports Talk – hosted by John Short
- More on Sports – featuring play-by-play veteran Bryn Griffiths and Jake Daniels (the "voice of the fan").
- Way Offside – hosted by Jake Daniels
- The Pipeline Show – hockey program hosted by Global Edmonton's Dean Millard and columnist Guy Flaming
- The Ultimate Soccer Show – 3-hour Soccer program hosted by "Soccersteve" Steve O'Boyle. Steve served under Fifa as Fifa World Cup LOC media head & Alberta Soccer media rep 2004-2009.

CFRN was the flagship station for the following teams' radio broadcasts:

- Edmonton Oil Kings (WHL hockey)
- Spruce Grove Saints AJHL hockey (select games)
- University of Alberta Golden Bears football and hockey games (select games)
