= WLRO =

- Denham Springs, Louisiana; United States
- Broadcast area: Baton Rouge metropolitan area
- Frequency: 1210 kHz

History
- First air date: April 15, 1959 (as WLBI)
- Last air date: June 16, 2017
- Former call signs: WLBI (1959–1985); WBIU (1985–1997); WSKR (1997–2012)

Technical information
- Facility ID: 37815
- Class: B
- Power: 10,000 watts (day); 1,000 watts (night)
- Transmitter coordinates: 30°31′20″N 90°58′15″W

WLRO (1210 AM was a radio station serving the Baton Rouge area of the U.S. state of Louisiana. The station broadcast with powers of 10 kilowatts daytime and 1 kilowatt at night, and was licensed to Denham Springs, where the transmitter was also located. Its studios were located east of downtown Baton Rouge near the I-10/I-12 interchange.

== History ==
Logo as "1210 The Score"

AM 1210 was a Christian talk radio station, WBIU, until 1997 when it was acquired by Clear Channel (forerunner to iHeartMedia) and switched to a sports talk format, under the call letters WSKR. It was an ESPN Radio affiliate until February 2007, when it switched to Fox Sports Radio.

On January 2, 2012, WSKR changed its format to gospel, branded as "Hallelujah 1210" under new call letters, WLRO. After nearly three decades of the state's second largest metropolitan area offering as many as five sports radio shows daily, all shows were cancelled via a text message to the sports hosts on New Year's Eve; a week prior to the NFL's New Orleans Saints playoff run and LSU's preparation in its bid to win a third BCS National Championship.

On October 29, 2012, the station flipped to an all comedy format, carrying the 24/7 Comedy network. It switched formats again on August 3, 2014, after 24/7 Comedy ceased operations; the station flipped back to a sports talk format, rebranding themselves once again as "1210 The Score". On August 13, 2016, WLRO's transmitter site in Denham Springs, Louisiana suffered extensive damage due to historic flooding in the Baton Rouge area, which took the station silent. WLRO returned to the air on June 6, 2017 resuming programming from Fox Sports Radio, but again went silent on June 16, 2017. iHeartMedia surrendered the station's license on June 13, 2018; the Federal Communications Commission (FCC) cancelled it on July 9, 2018.
