= CIRK-FM =

Radio station in Edmonton

- Edmonton, Alberta; Canada
- Broadcast area: Edmonton Metropolitan Region
- Frequency: 97.3 MHz
- Branding: K-97

Programming
- Format: Classic rock

Ownership
- Owner: Stingray Radio
- Sister stations: CFCW, CFCW-FM, CKRA-FM, CKJR

History
- First air date: August 23, 1949
- Former call signs: CJCA-FM (1949–1975)
- Former frequencies: 99.5 MHz (1949–1975)
- Call sign meaning: Canada's Immortal Rock

Technical information
- Class: C
- ERP: 100,000 watts
- HAAT: 230.5 meters (756 ft)
- Transmitter coordinates: 53°25′9″N 113°14′29″W

Links
- Website: k97.ca

CIRK-FM (97.3 FM, K-97) is a radio station in Edmonton, Alberta. Owned by Stingray Group, it broadcasts a classic rock format. CIRK's studios are located inside the West Edmonton Mall, alongside its metropolitan sister stations CFCW, CKRA-FM, and CKJR, while its transmitter is located at Ellerslie Road and Provincial Highway 21, just southeast of the Edmonton city limits.

As of February 28, 2021, CIRK is the 6th-most-listened-to radio station in the Edmonton market according to a PPM data report released by Numeris.

== History ==
CIRK signed on the air on August 23, 1949 as CJCA-FM, originally located at 99.5 MHz as an FM simulcast of CJCA. It later began programming separately from CJCA between 5:50 p.m. and midnight on Monday to Friday, 5:50 p.m. to 1:00 a.m. on Saturday and 5:00 p.m. to midnight on Sunday. The station switched to its current frequency and call sign in 1975 and became known on-air in 1979 as K-97, becoming an Edmonton favourite during the 1980s. In the mid-1980s, CIRK was broadcast crystal clear throughout North America as a secondary audio frequency on channel 18 of Canadian satellite Anik D. For many years, mornings were hosted by Bruce Kenyon.

The station has a reputation of keeping long term talented announcers. Rob Berg since the early 1980s and Melissa Wright mid 1990s.

In 1997, the station was rebranded as K-Rock 97.3. In 1998, CIRK was purchased by Newcap Broadcasting, who already owned CKRA-FM and CFCW in the city. Through much of the next five years the station regained its success, however in the early part of 2007, the station has struggled in the ratings, with public firings of new and long time staff members. CIRK had rebounded to be the 5th most listened to radio station in Edmonton. As of July 7, 2008, the station returned to the old K-97 branding.

On February 10, 2009 the station announced that the morning team of Terry, Bill, and Steve would be returning after almost three years off the air. The Terry, Bill, and Steve Show dominated Edmonton ratings from 2000-2005. The show returned on February 23, 2009.

The current morning show is hosted by Brad, Alysha, and Pete

Since 2022, the station has temporarily rebranded as "Konnor 97" (in honor of Connor McDavid) during the Stanley Cup playoffs if the Edmonton Oilers are playing.

== Rebroadcasters ==
CIRK-FM also operates on a number of low-power FM transmitters.

=== Alberta ===
- VF2214 106.3 FM - Luscar

CIRK was a rebroadcaster in Jasper with local tourist information and has changed to its current call letters CJAG-FM.

=== British Columbia ===
- VF2053 102.5 FM - Logan Lake
- VF2103 103.9 FM - Fort St. James
- VF2204 95.5 FM - Kemano
- VF2475 94.1 FM - Fraser Lake

=== Northwest Territories ===
- CKXY-FM 92.3 FM - Fort Smith (Left the air in 2018)

=== Saskatchewan ===
- VF2001 92.9 FM - La Ronge
