= CFBR-FM =

Radio station in Edmonton, Alberta

- Edmonton, Alberta; Canada
- Broadcast area: Edmonton Metropolitan Region
- Frequency: 100.3 MHz
- Branding: 100.3 The Bear

Programming
- Format: Active rock

Ownership
- Owner: Bell Media; (Bell Media Radio G.P)
- Sister stations: CFRN(former), CFMG-FM, CFRN-DT, CJAY-FM

History
- First air date: 1951
- Former call signs: CFRN-FM (1951–1979); CKXM (1979–1988); CJKE (1988–1992)
- Call sign meaning: BR for "Bear"

Technical information
- Class: C
- ERP: 100 kW
- HAAT: 200.3 metres (657 ft)
- Transmitter coordinates: 53°27′47″N 113°20′6.5″W

Links
- Webcast: Listen Live
- Website: iheartradio.ca/100-3-the-bear

CFBR-FM is a Canadian radio station, broadcasting an active rock format at 100.3 FM in Edmonton, Alberta. The station uses its on-air brand name 100.3 The Bear and is owned by Bell Media. The station's studios are located at 18520 Stony Plain Road in Edmonton, while its transmitter is located near Range Road 234 and 34 Avenue in eastern Edmonton.

== History ==
The station was launched in 1951 by Sunwapta Broadcasting as CFRN-FM, simulcasting the AM programming of CFRN. It launched separate programming in 1964, and adopted the callsign CKXM in 1979. The station was sold to CAP Communications in 1988 and adopted the callsign CJKE the following year.

The station was acquired by Standard Broadcasting in 1992, and adopted the current CFBR callsign, rock format and "Bear" branding in September of that year.

CFBR-FM is rebroadcast in Jasper on 92.3 CJAG-FM.

On September 28, 2007, the CRTC approved the sale of CFBR and all Standard Radio assets to Astral Media.

On June 27, 2013, the CRTC approved the sale of all but 10 Astral Media Radio Stations to BCE (Bell Media). The sale including CFBR.

In 2008, CFBR was rated as the third most listened-to station in the Edmonton market. But by the Fall 2011 book, it had dropped to #6.

As of February 28, 2021, CFBR is the 9th-most-listened-to radio station in the Edmonton market according to a PPM data report released by Numeris.

== Notes ==
CFBR used to be the call sign of an AM station in Brockville, Ontario, known today as CFJR-FM, and was also a call sign of an AM radio station in Sudbury that is now known as CHYC-FM.
