= CJAY-FM =

Radio station in Calgary

Calgary, Alberta; Canada
- Broadcast area: Calgary Metropolitan Region, Banff, Lake Louise, Invermere
- Frequency: 92.1 MHz
- Branding: CJAY 92

Programming
- Format: Active rock

Ownership
- Owner: Bell Media; (Bell Media Radio G.P.)
- Sister stations: CKMX, CIBK-FM, CFBR-FM

History
- First air date: June 1, 1977

Technical information
- Class: C
- ERP: 100,000 watts
- HAAT: 298.5 metres (979 ft)
- Transmitter coordinates: 51.065°N 114.214°W

Links
- Webcast: Listen Live
- Website: iheartradio.ca/cjay92

CJAY-FM (CJAY 92) is a Canadian radio station that broadcasts an active rock format at 92.1 FM in Calgary, Alberta. The station uses its on-air brand name as CJAY 92 and is owned by Bell Media. CJAY's studios are located in the CTV Calgary studios on Patina Rise S.W. in the Prominence Point neighborhood of Calgary. The station operates repeater transmitters in Banff and Invermere, British Columbia. Its founder was Ralph Connor, who moved to Calgary from Sudbury, Ontario to start the station.

== History ==
CJAY was owned by Standard Broadcasting until 2007, when Standard Radio was acquired by Astral from Standard Broadcasting due to Standard's exit from terrestrial broadcasting. As part of Astral's merger with Bell Media on June 27, 2013, CJAY is now owned by Bell Media.

By September 2010, CJAY changed its logo and slogan, as well as format from mainstream rock to active rock, similar to then-sister station CKQB-FM in Ottawa.

On June 2, 2018, CJAY's studios relocated from their Centre Street location where they had been for 15 years back to their original location on Broadcast Hill, while its transmitter is located at Old Banff Coach Road and 85 Street Southwest.

CJAY is currently home to Mornings with Jesse (Modz) and JD (Lewis), Ashleigh Darrach, Reaper and Tyler Janzen.

== Rebroadcasters ==
Rebroadcasters of CJAY-FM
City of licence	Identifier	Frequency	Power	RECNet	CRTC Decision
Banff	CJAY-FM-1	95.1 FM	30 watts	Query	770549
Lake Louise	CJAY-FM-2	97.5 FM	50 watts	Query	790168
Invermere, British Columbia	CJAY-FM-3	99.7 FM	50 watts	Query	790362
