= CFPL-DT =

Television station in London, Ontario, Canada

- London, Ontario; Canada
- Channels: Digital: 10 (VHF); Virtual: 10
- Branding: CTV2 London (general); CTV News London (newscasts)

Programming
- Affiliations: 10.1: CTV2

Ownership
- Owner: Bell Media Inc.
- Sister stations: TV: CKCO-DT; Radio: CIQM-FM, CJBX-FM

History
- First air date: November 28, 1953
- Former call signs: CFPL-TV (1953–2011)
- Former channel numbers: Analog: 10 (VHF, 1953–2011)
- Former affiliations: CBC (1953–1988); Independent (1988–1998)
- Call sign meaning: Free Press of London (founding owner and local newspaper)

Technical information
- Licensing authority: CRTC
- ERP: 45 kW
- HAAT: 302.1 m (991 ft)
- Transmitter coordinates: 42°56′59″N 81°15′53″W

Links
- Website: CTV2 London

CFPL-DT (channel 10) is a television station in London, Ontario, Canada, part of the CTV2 system. It is owned and operated by Bell Media alongside Kitchener-based CTV station CKCO-DT (channel 13), although the two stations maintain separate operations. CFPL-DT's studios and local transmitter are located on Communications Road on the southwestern side of London.

== History ==
CFPL was founded by Walter J. Blackburn, who also owned London's major newspaper, the London Free Press, as well as radio station CFPL on both the AM and FM bands. The television station first came on the air on November 28, 1953, with four hours of programming per day. That night, there was a major fire in London, on which CFPL's news program was able to report almost immediately during its first news hour. The station's transmitter was originally located atop the 500-foot (152 m) CFPL Television Tower, which was completed that year.

CFPL was the second privately owned station in Canada (CKSO-TV in Sudbury, now CICI-TV, was the first). Its news program was the first to be scheduled at 6 p.m., during "the supper hour", which set the standard for other stations in Canada. In 1973, the station expanded its supper-hour news to a full hour. CFPL also later became one of the first in Canada to broadcast in colour. From the day it began broadcasting, CFPL was affiliated with the Canadian Broadcasting Corporation. In 1961, CFPL-TV began transmitting its signal from a 314-metre (1,030 ft) tall guyed tower located in London, which is one of the oldest supertall television towers in Canada. In 1963, it became the CBC affiliate for Kitchener as well after CKCO-TV switched to CTV.

CFPL was the CBC's largest private affiliate, but wanted to produce and broadcast more local programming. This caused its relations with the CBC to worsen over the years. CBC required affiliates like CFPL to carry a minimum amount of its schedule, and, according to station management, CBC programming was less lucrative by that time. Nonetheless, CFPL was a very successful station, and posted good profits. It finally disaffiliated with CBC and went independent on September 4, 1988. CFPL's slogan following disaffiliation was "The fun is here!", but the slogan did not last. With no CBC programming, such as The National and Hockey Night in Canada to attract viewers, ratings plummeted and so did revenues. By the end of 1989, the station was almost bankrupt, but tried to hang on as an independent station for another few years, even though its programming schedule did not have much beyond news to attract viewership.

Logo used while as BBS, used from 1994 to 1998.

In 1992, amid poor ratings and low revenues, the station was sold to Baton Broadcasting. In 1994, the various Baton stations, including CFPL, merged to form first "Ontario Network Television", then renamed Baton Broadcast System. Baton greatly increased CFPL's news department, hiring dozens of people and rebranding the newscast as News Now. While Baton focused much of energy on news programming, it cut much non-news local programming from many stations, including CFPL. The long-time lifestyles program One O'Clock Live was cancelled in early 1997, for example.

=== As The New PL ===
Logo used while as The New PL, used from 1998 to 2005.

In 1997, Baton sold CFPL and some of its other television stations to CHUM Limited. Under CHUM, CFPL joined the NewNet system and was accordingly rebranded "The New PL" on September 7, 1998. This was not done without controversy. In April that year, CHUM fired news co-anchor Al McGregor, which generated harsh criticism of the station's new owners and its new format in style of Citytv's programming. News director George Clark replaced him as co-anchor for some time, but he left the station in early 2001. In October 2002, Kate Young moved on to a community relations position at the station, and reporter Kathy Mueller replaced her as anchor at 6 p.m. Dan MacLellan joined the station from A-Channel station CKEM-TV in Edmonton (now a Citytv owned-and-operated station) at that time, and became her co-anchor.

In February 2005, CHUM announced plans to consolidate the master control operations for CFPL, CKVR, CHRO, CHWI and CKNX at 299 Queen Street West in Toronto, and consolidating the traffic and programming departments at CFPL in London, resulting in the loss of approximately 13 staff members from CFPL. On June 3, 2005, at approximately 10 a.m., the London master control signal came to an end, as the new consolidated master control took to air.

=== As A-Channel London ===
Logo used while as A-Channel, used from 2005–2008.

On August 2, 2005, CFPL was rebranded as A-Channel as part of CHUM Limited's rebranding of the NewNet stations. While Craig Media's A-Channel stations merged into Citytv following CHUM's acquisition of Craig Media in 2004. NewsNow at Noon was cancelled one month earlier. On July 12, 2006, CTV owner CTVglobemedia announced plans to purchase A-Channel owner CHUM Limited for CA$1.7 billion, with plans to divest itself of the A-Channel stations and the Access Alberta cable channel.

On April 9, 2007, Omni Television owner Rogers Communications applied to the Canadian Radio-television and Telecommunications Commission (CRTC) to purchase all of the A-Channel stations (including CFPL), CKX-TV and several cable channels being put up for sale in the wake of CTVglobemedia's pending acquisition of the CHUM group.

On June 8, 2007, the CRTC announced its approval of CTVglobemedia's purchase of CHUM Limited, but added a condition that CTVglobemedia must sell off CHUM's Citytv stations to another buyer while keeping the A-Channel stations (including CFPL), in effect cancelling the planned sale of A-Channel to Rogers Media.

On June 22, 2007, all of the CHUM Limited channels (with the exception of Citytv) were officially taken over by CTVglobemedia. On July 26, 2007, CTVglobemedia named Richard Gray the head of news for the A-Channel stations and CKX-TV.

=== As A London ===
Logo used while as A London, used from 2008 to 2011

On August 11, 2008, CFPL was rebranded as A as part of CTVglobemedia's rebranding of the A-Channel stations. A rebranding campaign began earlier in June 2008 with newscasts being referred to by the station's employees as A News. Following the closure of sister station CKNX-TV in Wingham on August 31, 2009, that station became a repeater of CFPL.

On September 10, 2010, BCE announced plans to re-acquire 100% of CTVglobemedia's broadcasting arm, including CFPL (and the entire A television system). Under the deal, Woodbridge Company Limited, Torstar, and the Ontario Teachers' Pension Plan would together receive $1.3 billion in either cash or equity in BCE, while BCE will also assume $1.7 billion in debt (BCE's existing equity interest is $200 million, for a total transaction value of $3.2 billion). Woodbridge will also regain majority control of the Globe and Mail Inc., with Bell retaining a 15% interest. The deal was approved by the CRTC on March 7, 2011.

On April 1, 2011, Bell Canada finalized its purchase of the assets of CTVglobemedia it did not already own, with CFPL (along with the rest of the A system) officially becoming part of Bell Media.

=== As CTV Two/CTV2 London ===
Logo used from 2011 to 2018

On May 30, 2011, Bell Media announced that the A television stations, including CFPL, would be rebranded as CTV Two on August 29, 2011. On that date, CFPL rebranded from "A London" to "CTV Two London". At the same time, A News London became CTV News London, also the station began carrying programming (excluding newscasts for the time being) in a high definition format.

On March 18, 2012, riots were started by students of Fanshawe College when St. Patrick's Day parties got out of hand. A CFPL news van was set on fire.

On June 27, 2016, it was announced that Bell Media filed a proposal with the CRTC to shut down CKNX-TV, which is among 40 of its television transmitters (all rebroadcasters of other stations) slated for closure, due to maintenance costs, high cable and satellite viewership, and no generation of revenue.

This was part of Bell's regular periodic licence renewal process, which began on February 11, 2016. Bell Media's rationale for deleting these analog repeaters is below:

"We are electing to delete these analog transmitters from the main licence with which they are associated. These analog transmitters generate no incremental revenue, attract little to no viewership given the growth of BDU or DTH subscriptions and are costly to maintain, repair or replace. In addition, none of the highlighted transmitters offer any programming that differs from the main channels. The Commission has determined that broadcasters may elect to shut down transmitters but will lose certain regulatory privileges (distribution on the basic service, the ability to request simultaneous substitution) as noted in Broadcasting Regulatory Policy CRTC 2015–24, Over-the-air transmission of television signals and local programming. We are fully aware of the loss of these regulatory privileges as a result of any transmitter shutdown."

At the same time, Bell Media applied to convert the licences of CTV2 Atlantic (formerly ASN) and CTV2 Alberta (formerly ACCESS) from satellite-to-cable undertakings into television stations without transmitters (similar to cable-only network affiliates in the United States), and to reduce the level of educational content on CTV2 Alberta.

== Local programming ==
=== Programs produced in the past ===
- London Tigers baseball (1989–1993)
- Reach for the Top
- The Red Green Show (1993–1994, in association with YTV)
- Take Your Choice (1960–1971)

=== News operation ===
CFPL-DT presently broadcasts ten hours of locally produced newscasts each week (with 1 1/2 hours on weekdays and Sundays, and one hour on Saturdays). During the late 1950s and early 1960s, Ward Cornell anchored sports before moving on to Hockey Night in Canada. Prior to 1972, Hugh Bremner, anchor of Panorama Newsreel, became anchor of the new FYI. A half-hour summer replacement program at 5:30 p.m. (preceding the news) called Pie in Your FYI, a spoof of FYI was played one summer in the 1960s. It began with a CFPL personality being hit in the face with a pie, and featured skits and spoofs of advertising.

From 1972 to 1981, the flagship newscast, FYI was anchored by Jack Burghardt. During the 1980s, FYI was anchored first by Eric Sorensen (1981–1984), then Neil Stevens (a former weather anchor at CBET Windsor). In January 1985, CFPL hired its first female anchor, Kate Young, who co-anchored FYI with Stevens. Despite female news anchors becoming commonplace across Canada and the United States by the mid-1980s, this was a controversial move, and many London viewers were very upset by there being a female anchor. Young continued to anchor the 6 p.m. newscast for the next 17 years, and she became a well-known and respected face in the London community. Tragically, her co-anchor Stevens was killed in a car crash near Alvinston, Ontario, early on July 17, 1987. Al McGregor was appointed as Young's co-anchor in 1988, a post he held for the next 10 years. Throughout the 1980s, the sports anchor was Pete James (now with CJBK radio), and the weather forecaster was Jay Campbell.

During the station's ownership by Baton, the newscasts were retitled News Now, which carried over into the CHUM era. When CHUM took over, the previously standard news format gave way to one replicating that used by then-sister station Citytv and other NewNet stations, in which anchors read the news standing up from a large open newsroom referred to as the "news environment".

Anchor Kathy Mueller resigned as of August 19, 2008, after a 13-year career at the station to pursue a new career with the Canadian Red Cross in Indonesia, assisting with relief efforts resulting from the 2004 tsunami disaster. Jay Campbell also retired as CFPL weather specialist on October 16, 2009, after a 28-year career at the station, and was replaced by 11 p.m. weeknight weather specialist, Julie Atchision on October 19, 2009. On September 8, 2010, Atchision left the station due to maternity leave and was replaced by Ross Hull, who was the weather specialist for the 6 and 11 p.m. weeknight newscasts until he left to work as a weather specialist for CTV station CKCO-TV in Kitchener. Hull is now a meteorologist with Global owned-and-operated station CIII-DT in Toronto.

On March 4, 2009, CFPL replaced A Morning with six back to back repeats of the previous night's 11 p.m. newscast as part of a larger series of cutbacks which axed 118 jobs at the A stations.

On December 24, 2011, CFPL's 6 p.m. main news anchor, Dan McLellan was arrested and was subsequently charged with several counts of assault, and as a result, he resigned from his duties at the station. Tara Overholt subsequently became the anchor of the 6 p.m. weekday newscasts.

== Technical information ==
=== Subchannel ===
Subchannel of CFPL-DT
Subchannel	Res.	Short name	Programming
10.1	1080i	CFPL	CTV2

=== Analog-to-digital conversion ===
On August 31, 2011, when Canadian television stations in CRTC-designated mandatory markets transitioned from analog to digital broadcasts, CFPL-TV flash cut its digital signal into operation on VHF channel 10.
