= CJCN-FM =

Radio station in Surrey, British Columbia

- Surrey, British Columbia; Canada
- Broadcast area: Greater Vancouver
- Frequency: 91.5 MHz (HD Radio)
- Branding: Connect 91.5

Programming
- Format: Multicultural

Ownership
- Owner: Akash Broadcasting Inc.
- Sister stations: CKER-FM

History
- First air date: December 20, 2019
- Call sign meaning: From "Connect"

Technical information
- Class: A
- ERP: 0.601 kW (average); 1.9 kW
- HAAT: 128.5 m
- Transmitter coordinates: 49°8′53.16″N 122°53′34.80″W

Links
- Website: connectfm.ca

CJCN-FM (91.5 FM, "Connect 91.5") is a radio station licensed to Surrey, British Columbia. Owned by Akash Broadcasting, it broadcasts programming serving Greater Vancouver's South Asian communities.

== History ==
In 2016, the Canadian Radio-television and Telecommunications Commission considered seven applications for a new commercial ethnic radio station to serve Surrey and Vancouver. The Akash application won approval from the CRTC for repatriating revenues lost to cross-border ethnic broadcasters based in northwestern Washington; it specified an entirely ethnic format serving the area's South Asian population, with more than 75 percent in languages other than English; 121 hours a week of local programming, about 40 percent of that in speech programs; and 50 percent Canadian content in music. Before launch, the transmitter site proposed was lost, and a new one was approved.

On-air testing for CJCN-FM began December 20, 2019.

In 2021, CKER-FM, CJCN-FM's sister station in Edmonton, Alberta, was rebranded from 101.7 World FM to Connect FM 101.7.
