= CFCW-FM =

Radio station in Camrose, Alberta

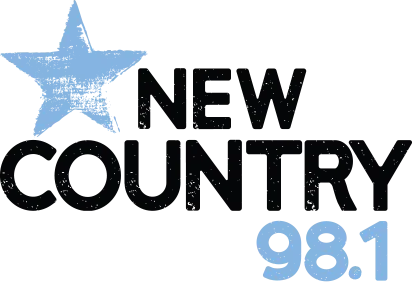
- Camrose, Alberta; Canada
- Broadcast area: Edmonton Metropolitan Region
- Frequency: 98.1 MHz
- Branding: New Country 98.1

Programming
- Format: Country
- Affiliations: Westwood One; Camrose Kodiaks

Ownership
- Owner: Stingray Radio
- Sister stations: CFCW, CIRK-FM, CKRA-FM, CKJR

History
- First air date: September 30, 2005
- Call sign meaning: taken from its AM sister station

Technical information
- Class: B
- ERP: 50,000 watts
- HAAT: 132 metres (433 ft)
- Transmitter coordinates: 53.018°N 112.839°W

Links
- Webcast: Listen Live
- Website: newcountry981.com

CFCW-FM (98.1 MHz, New Country 98.1) is a radio station licensed to Camrose, Alberta, and serving the Edmonton Metropolitan Region. Owned by Stingray Radio, it broadcasts a country format.

== History ==
The station began broadcasting in 2003 with a country format that had moved over to CKRA-FM in Edmonton in 2005 to make room for the adult hits format on 98.1 FM, known at the time as 98.1 CAM-FM.

Previous logo

As of November 30, 2017, the country format returned to the station now rebranded as New Country 98.1.
