= CKER-FM =

Radio station in Edmonton, Alberta

- Edmonton, Alberta; Canada
- Broadcast area: Edmonton Metropolitan Region
- Frequency: 101.7 MHz
- Branding: Connect 101.7

Programming
- Format: Multilingual

Ownership
- Owner: Akash Broadcasting Inc

History
- First air date: 1980
- Former frequencies: 1480 kHz (1980–1994); 101.9 MHz (1994–2006)
- Call sign meaning: Edmonton Radio

Technical information
- Class: C
- ERP: 100,000 watts horizontal 24,000 watts vertical
- HAAT: 272 metres (892 ft)
- Transmitter coordinates: 53°31′54.84″N 113°46′51.6″W
- Repeater: CJWE-FM 88.1 HD2 Calgary

Links
- Website: edmonton.connectfm.ca

CKER-FM (101.7 FM, "Connect 101.7") is a radio station in Edmonton, Alberta. Owned by Akash Broadcasting, it broadcasts programming serving South Asian communities in Edmonton.

== History ==
CKER-FM first hit the airwaves as CKER-AM on November 1, 1980, as Edmonton's first and only multilingual station. It was owned by O.K. Radio Group, which was headed by Roger Charest and Stu Morton. The station operated at 1480 AM with a broadcasting power of 10,000 watts.

In 1982, O.K. Radio Group spun off CKER into a separate company, CKER Radio Ltd., headed by Roger Charest and other investors.

In 1994, CKER was granted approval by the CRTC to move to the FM band at 101.9 MHz with an ERP of 64,000 watts, on a frequency previously used by CKO from 1978 to 1989. This would later be increased to 100,000 watts. On January 18, 2006, CKER received approval to move from 101.9 to 101.7 MHz in an effort to alleviate interference that was being caused to other stations.

On November 29, 2006, CKER-FM was sold to Rogers Communications who also purchased other stations owned by O.K. Radio Group. Rogers pledged to keep the station the same, with a multilingual format and the World FM branding.

The station was twice named the best multicultural station in 2009 and 2010 at the Canadian Music and Broadcast Industry Awards.

In August 2020, Rogers filed with the CRTC to sell CKER-FM to Akash Broadcasting, owner of CJCN-FM in Surrey, British Columbia. The sale was approved three months later on December 2, with the station being transferred from Rogers to Akash Broadcasting for $6.7 million.

On August 18, 2021, CKER was rebranded from World FM to Connect FM to match CJCN.

The station was branded as 101.7 World FM until August 2021.

== Programming ==
CKER airs programming in over 10 languages serving over 12 ethnic groups. It has programming in the following languages: Arabic, Cantonese, Filipino, German, Italian, Mandarin, Polish, Punjabi, Spanish and Ukrainian.
