= CFCW (AM) =

Radio station in Camrose, Alberta

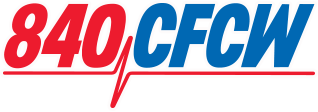
- Camrose, Alberta; Canada
- Broadcast area: Central Alberta
- Frequency: 840 kHz
- Branding: 840 CFCW

Programming
- Format: Traditional country
- Affiliations: Westwood One

Ownership
- Owner: Stingray Radio
- Sister stations: CFCW-FM, CIRK-FM, CKRA-FM, CKJR

History
- First air date: November 2, 1954
- Former frequencies: 1230 kHz (1954–1961); 790 kHz (1961–2015)
- Call sign meaning: Canada's Finest Country and Western

Technical information
- Class: B
- Power: 50,000 watts (day); 40,000 watts (night)
- Transmitter coordinates: 52°57′40″N 112°57′36″W

Links
- Website: cfcw.com

CFCW (840 AM) is a radio station licensed to Camrose, Alberta. Owned by Stingray Group, it broadcasts a traditional country format targeting Camrose, Central Alberta, and the Edmonton Metropolitan Region. The station shares studios with its local sister station CFCW-FM at 5708 48 Avenue in Camrose. The station also originates programming from Stingray's Edmonton studios at West Edmonton Mall, alongside its metropolitan sister stations CIRK-FM, CKRA-FM, and CKJR.

CFCW is currently ranked #7 and the 3rd most listened-to AM station in the market according to the Winter 2018/2019 Numeris data report. Most of the station's listeners live in rural areas outside Edmonton.

== History ==
CFCW started on November 2, 1954, on 1230 kHz, with 250 watts power. In 1958, the station increased transmitter power up to 1,000 watts. In 1961, the station changed frequencies to 790 kHz, with 10,000 watts power. In 1976, the station increased transmitter power again to 50,000 watts, serving the Edmonton area as well. On July 28, 2008, Newcap applied to amend the license by changing its frequency to 840 kHz. The application was approved; however, the move was essentially voided when the station then at 830 kHz in Wainwright was denied permission to move to FM. The Wainwright station ultimately re-applied for and got permission to move to FM; as a result, in spring 2015, CFCW began advertising a pending move to 840. On August 1, 2015, CFCW officially moved from 790 to 840 with nighttime power reduced to 40,000 watts to protect the cross-continent clear-channel service of WHAS, in Louisville, Kentucky.

Former logo of CFCW at 790 kHz
