= CIBK-FM =

Radio station in Calgary

- Calgary, Alberta; Canada
- Broadcast area: Calgary Metropolitan Region
- Frequency: 98.5 MHz
- Branding: 98.5 Virgin Radio

Programming
- Format: Contemporary hit radio
- Affiliations: Premiere Networks

Ownership
- Owner: Bell Media; (Bell Media Radio G.P.)
- Sister stations: CJAY-FM

History
- First air date: September 6, 2002

Technical information
- Class: C
- ERP: 100,000 watts
- HAAT: 298.5 metres (979 ft)
- Transmitter coordinates: 51.065°N 114.214°W

Links
- Webcast: Listen Live
- Website: iheartradio.ca/virginradio/calgary

CIBK-FM (98.5 Virgin Radio) is a contemporary hit radio station based in Calgary, Alberta, Canada. The Bell Media outlet operates at 98.5 FM with an effective radiated power of 100 kW from a transmitter located at the intersection of Old Banff Coach Road and 85 Street Southwest, and its studios located in the CTV Calgary studios on Patina Rise SW in the Prominence Point neighborhood of Calgary.

As of Winter 2020, CIBK is the 16th-most-listened-to radio station in the Calgary market according to a PPM data report released by Numeris.

== History ==
The station received approval by the CRTC in March 2001. CIBK made its debut on September 6, 2002, as Vibe 98.5, and planned to be the city's first R&B/hip hop station, but were preceded by CKIS by about a month. This would spark a format war in Calgary, with both stations making potshots at one another. On April 1, 2003, CKIS abruptly changed to the "Jack FM" format, leaving CIBK as the sole R&B station.

However, CIBK transitioned to a rhythmic contemporary direction by 2003, and to a mainstream Top 40 direction in 2004. CIBK still played R&B/hip hop product (although at a reduced rate), and also incorporated pop and dance into the mix, in part due to its license with the CRTC that now requires the station to be programmed as a Top 40/CHR outlet. Because CIBK was anticipated for years prior to its launch to be Calgary's long-awaited urban station, it had faced much criticism for bailing out to a Top 40 format leaving many of the station's hip-hop/R&B fans disappointed and let down by Standard.

CIBK was part of the acquisition of most of the assets of Standard Broadcasting by Astral Media that was completed on October 29, 2007. Under Astral, CIBK dropped the rhythmic lean.

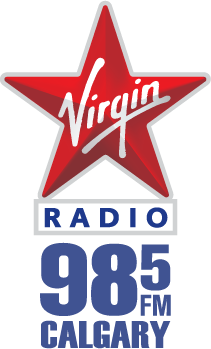
Former "Virgin" logo (2010–2019)

On April 1, 2010, Astral Media registered the domain names, VirginRadio985.com, Virgin985.com and VirginCalgary.com, which many speculated would be a branding change for CIBK to become a part of the Virgin Radio branding in Canada. This was confirmed on the Vibe Morning Show's June 23, 2010 broadcast, and the rebranding took place on June 30 at Noon, and will retain its Top 40 format. It is the second Virgin Radio station with a mainstream Top 40 format after Toronto's CKFM-FM. The last song on "Vibe" was "Goodbye" by Kristinia DeBarge, while the first song on "Virgin" was "California Gurls" by Katy Perry.

CIBK-FM is the longest-tenured Top 40/CHR station in Alberta still having the format today, only Edmonton's CKNG-FM (now adult hits since 2004) had the longest-tenured format from 1991-2003.

As part of the merger of Astral and Bell Media approved by the CRTC on June 27, 2013, CIBK is now owned by Bell Media.
