= CJBX-FM =

Radio station in London, Ontario

Coordinates: 42°56′40″N 81°4′47″W

- London, Ontario; Canada
- Broadcast area: Southwestern Ontario
- Frequency: 92.7 MHz
- Branding: Pure Country 93

Programming
- Format: Country
- Affiliations: Premiere Networks

Ownership
- Owner: Bell Media
- Sister stations: CIQM-FM

History
- First air date: March 3, 1980

Technical information
- Class: B
- ERP: 50,000 watts
- HAAT: 121 metres (397 ft)

Links
- Webcast: Listen Live
- Website: iheartradio.ca/purecountry/london

CJBX-FM is a radio station in London, Ontario. Owned by Bell Media, it broadcasts a country format. Its studios are located at 1 Communications Road, along with CIQM-FM and CFPL-DT, while its transmitter is located on Cromarty Drive near Highway 401 and Westchester Bourne east of London.

== History ==
CJBX signed on the air on March 3, 1980, and has been a country station for its entire history. Except for a brief time in the early 1990s when it was known as Country 92.7, it had always been known as BX93.

On May 28, 2019, the station rebranded as Pure Country 93, as part of a nationwide rebranding.
