= CIQM-FM =

Radio station in London, Ontario

Coordinates: 42°57′20″N 81°21′19″W

- London, Ontario; Canada
- Broadcast area: Southwestern Ontario
- Frequency: 97.5 MHz
- Branding: 97.5 Virgin Radio

Programming
- Format: Contemporary hit radio
- Affiliations: Premiere Networks

Ownership
- Owner: Bell Media; (Bell Media Radio)
- Sister stations: CJBX-FM

History
- First air date: 1986
- Former frequencies: 103.1 MHz (1986–1993)

Technical information
- Class: B
- ERP: 50,000 watts
- HAAT: 141 metres (463 ft)

Links
- Webcast: Listen Live
- Website: iheartradio.ca/virginradio/london

CIQM-FM (97.5 MHz) is a commercial radio station in London, Ontario, Canada, branded as 97.5 Virgin Radio. It is owned by Bell Media and it airs a contemporary hit radio format. The station has several London-based full-time air personalities, while some shows are syndicated from iHeartRadio. The studios and offices are at 1 Communications Road off Highview Avenue West, shared with sister stations CJBX-FM and CFPL-DT.

CIQM-FM has an effective radiated power (ERP) of 50,000 watts. The transmitter is off Byron Baseline Road at Westdel Bourne Road, west of downtown London.

== History ==
=== CKO-FM-3 ===
The 97.5 FM dial position was first occupied by all-news radio station CKO-FM-3, part of the nationwide CKO radio network. CKO-FM-3 went on the air in November 1977. It was one of six CKO stations that signed on that year, including Toronto, Montreal and Ottawa.

However, poor advertising sales doomed the network, and it shut down in 1989. The move took all of the network's radio stations dark, including London. The 97.5 frequency remained silent for four years.

=== CIQM Moves to 97.5 ===
CIQM originally operated as Q103 at 103.1 FM, signing on in 1986. It moved to the 97.5 frequency vacated by CKO in 1993. The previous 103.1 frequency is now the home of CFHK-FM in St. Thomas.

For many years, the station was known as Q97.5, even after taking on the "EZ Rock" trademark. In 2006, the "Q" was dropped and the station became known as simply 97.5, London's EZ Rock.

=== Hot AC ===
On September 6, 2010, CIQM underwent several changes, including a tweak in branding as The New Sound of EZ Rock. It got a new logo and new on-air staff. The station moved from 24 years of playing adult contemporary music to a hot adult contemporary format. The switch was due to rival CKOT-FM switching from easy listening to a gold-based soft AC mix, and also because of rimshot rivals CIHR-FM and CHGK-FM, both mainstream AC stations, also being heard in London.

CIQM also dropped the decimal point from the station ID after flipping to Hot AC. Just after the format tweak, Astral Media switched CIQM's jingles to Hot AC jingles. Despite all of the changes, CIQM, which once dominated the market, suffered from ratings erosion, and had the lowest share in the London CMA, and was a distant second place behind CKOT-FM.

=== Virgin Radio ===
On August 13, 2012, CIQM pulled all its DJs off the air. Its website was replaced by a countdown clock, with a voiceover informing listeners to tune at 8 a.m. on August 17, when an impending "update" of the station would be completed. At that time, the station flipped to CHR/Top 40, becoming the fifth station in Canada to use the Virgin Radio branding.

The final song on "EZ Rock" was "Rehab" by Amy Winehouse, while the first song on "Virgin" was "Pound the Alarm" by Nicki Minaj. Longtime rival CFHK-FM became once again the market's only Hot AC station. CIQM-FM's flip to CHR filled the Top 40 void in London for the first time since 2004, when CFHK dropped it in favour of its current Hot AC format.

Final "EZ Rock" logo from 2010-2012
