= 2023 in radio =

The following is a list of events affecting radio broadcasting in 2023. Events listed include radio program debuts, finales, cancellations, station launches, closures, and format changes, as well as information about controversies and deaths of radio personalities.

== Notable events ==
=== January ===
Date	Event	Source
1	French private musical category D radio station Europe 2 is re-launched.	
1	After stunting with Christmas music since November 2022, United States radio station WNUU in York, Pennsylvania, is relaunched as WPPY, broadcasting Adult Contemporary music.	
10	WKPR-Kalamazoo, Michigan, United States, surrenders its license.	
10	KYTE-Independence, Oregon continues broadcasting illegally after having its license cancelled.	
23	After stunting with Christmas music since November 2022, Puerto Rican stations WRXD-Fajardo/San Juan, WNVI-Moca and the translator stations relaunched the Estereotempo name and its Adult Contemporary format after four years of absence.	
30	The new daily magazine show Commotion is launched on CBC Radio One in Canada.	
30	Aliw Broadcasting Corporation's Home Radio, DWQZ-FM, changes provincial stations in the Philippines with a rebranding to DWIZ-AM Regional Integrated News. DWQZ still remains in Pasig City, Metro Manila as 97.9 Home Radio.	

=== February ===
Date	Event	Source
27	US broadcasting company Audacy begins the process of winding down most of its HD Radio digital subchannels due to lack of revenue. (Channel Q, its mostly HD-exclusive LGBTQ service, is unaffected by the cuts.) Further cuts later in the year lead to the company spinning off the licenses of WLFP in Memphis, Tennessee and WTSS in Buffalo, New York to Educational Media Foundation.	

=== March ===
Date	Event	Source
15	Mexican social radio station XHCSAG-FM begins broadcasting after delays in completing its tower, attributed to COVID.	

=== April ===
Date	Event	Source
10	DZRM-AM returns to air after 10 months of inactivity and is rebranded as Radyo Pilipinas 3 Alert.	
21	US Top 40 station KRBE-Houston, Texas, temporarily rebrands as 104.1 TAY-RBE in honor of Taylor Swift performing the first of her three Eras Tour shows at NRG Stadium that night, with the station's playlist that day only consisting of songs from all of her albums.	

=== May ===
Date	Event	Source
12	New Zealand radio station Pulzar FM broadcasts for the last time, to be replaced by sister station Anthemz.	
20	Mexican radio station XHCORO-FM closes down for economic reasons.	

=== June ===
Date	Event	Source
14	Canada's Bell Media shuts down six radio stations, CJBK—London, CFRN—Edmonton, CFTE—Vancouver, CKST—Vancouver, CKMX—Calgary, and CFRW—Winnipeg, and is set to sell three more, CHAM—Hamilton, Ontario, CKOC—Hamilton, and CKWW—Windsor, as part of cuts across the company.	
26	KVOH Rancho Simi, California, a shortwave radio station based in the United States (serving the southern United States, the Gulf of Mexico and western Africa), ceases operations, citing the cost of electricity in California.	
30	Philippines radio station DWPM Radyo 630 is launched on AM, replacing DZMM-AM TeleRadyo in its frequency. This new station is a joint venture between Prime Media Holdings and ABS-CBN (owner of the former DZMM).	

=== July ===
Date	Event	Source
1	Philippines radio station Q Radio and its provincial stations permanently cease broadcasting after almost 3 years, to become a joint venture of Mareco Broadcasting Network and Brigada Mass Media Corporation as 105.1 Brigada News FM in Metro Manila, 105.1 Brigada News FM Baguio, and 90.7 Brigada News FM Cebu, while the Davao station becomes music-formatted 93.1 News FM in conjunction with its de facto sister station.	
12	A 74-year affiliation between Saint Bonaventure University and FM 95.7 in Olean, New York, United States, dating to the latter's debut in 1949, ends as the university's men's basketball squad severs ties with the station now known as WPIG and opts to carry its live broadcasts online.	

=== August ===
Date	Event	Source
8	Philippines radio station 103.1 Newsline Central Luzon was officially launched under JRS Newsline Multimedia Corporation and affiliated by Soundstream Broadcasting Corporation in San Fernando, Pampanga.	
14	Indian-American entrepreneur Manoj Bhargava announces a wave of acquisitions that includes the assumption of debt from Audacy and the purchase of a minority stake in Cumulus Media, as his Bridge Media Networks—owner of the television network NewsNet—merges with The Arena Group.	

=== September ===
Date	Event	Source
1	Canadian radio station CIRR-FM ("103.9 Proud FM"), launched in 2007 as Canada's and the world's first commercial radio station targeted to an LGBTQ listening audience, is scheduled to shut down, with its staff reassigned to sister station CIDC-FM.	
1	CJRI-FM in Fredericton, New Brunswick, Canada, goes silent after being denied a licence renewal and ordered to cease broadcasting by midnight on August 31, 2023.	
5	CKJR in Wetaskiwin, Alberta, is slated to shift formats from oldies music to sports, bringing the format back to the Edmonton market after the closure of CFRN in June.	
5	U.S. radio network NPR announces that John Lansing, NPR's president and CEO, is set to retire in December.	
22	The 2023 edition of Europe's Biggest Dance Show is simultaneously broadcast by stations in the UK (BBC Radio 1), Germany (1LIVE and Fritz), Austria (FM4), Norway (NRK mP3), Ukraine (Radio Promin), Belgium (Studio Brussel), Sweden (SR P3), Finland (YleX), and newcomers Catalonia (iCat) and Estonia (Raadio 2).	

=== October ===
Date	Event	Source
9	After airing daily for 84 years, the National Research Council Canada's midday time signal (a series of audio tics followed by "the beginning of the long dash" that marked 1PM Eastern Time) is heard for the final time on CBC Radio One, with the discontinuation due to latency issues with digital audio that render the signal inaccurate. Canada will continue to offer a time signal on the CHU shortwave service.	
16	In the Philippines, AllHitz24 was officially launched under Dumaguete Media Productions and affiliated by CETV Philippines in Dumaguete, Negros Oriental using online radio app.	
31	WMXL (Lexington, Kentucky) became the first non-stunting station in North America to flip to Christmas music for the 2023 season. (Though WMGA in Kenova, West Virginia had flipped to Christmas music on October 19, this format change turned out to be a stunt as the station changed formats after Christmas.)	

=== November ===
Date	Event	Source
5	Killing of Juan Jumalon: 57-year-old Filipino broadcaster Juan Jumalon, known on air as "Johnny Walker", is shot dead while hosting a live show from his home in Calamba, Misamis Occidental. Three men are later charged with murder and theft.	
30	Philippines radio station DWOW under Advanced Media Broadcasting System permanently ceases its K-Lite brand after its 10 years.	

=== December ===
Date	Event	Source
2	DZAR Sonshine Radio returns to operate after 1 year of hiatus due to transferring our new transmitter location.	
6	WXNT 1340 AM rebrands from "CBS Sports 1430" as "Indy's Sports Ticket", but retains sports radio programming from CBS Sports Radio in most dayparts and also retains the Rich Eisen show from Westwood One in the evenings. The station will also continue airing Butler basketball.	.
19	Annie Nightingale, BBC Radio One's first female DJ, makes her final broadcast.	.
19	KIFS 107.5 in Eugene, Oregon at 2:00 PM flips from its previous format as CHR "KISS 107.5 FM" to Rhythmic Gold as "107.5 The Beat", as the station focus on Pop Rhythmic hits from the 80s to the 2000s.	.
21	DZAR temporarily stopped its operations due to a 30-day suspension order of the National Telecommunications Commission together with DWAQ-DTV and SMNI News Channel.	
31	DR turns off their longwave transmitter forever.	

== Deaths ==
- January 8:
  - Arnie Coro, Cuban radio host, co-founder of Radio Havana (born 1942)
  - Ernst Grissemann, Austrian radio host, journalist, and actor (born 1934)
- January 13: Ray Cordeiro, Hong Kong disc jockey (born 1924)
- January 20: Jerry Blavat, American disc jockey (born 1940)
- January 22: Lin Brehmer, American disc jockey (born 1954)
- February 11: Ivan Kováč, Slovak middle-distance runner and radio sports commentator (born 1948)
- March 5: Mark Pilgrim, South African broadcaster (born 1969)
- March 26: Ray Pillow, American country music singer/executive and Grand Ole Opry member (born 1937)
- March 30: Doug Mulray, Australian radio broadcaster (born 1951)
- April 12: Eduard Bagirov, Russian writer and broadcaster (born 1975)
- April 19: Ed Picson, Filipino sports broadcaster (born 1953)
- May 19: George Logan, British actor, composer, musician and broadcaster (The Enchanting World of Hinge and Bracket, etc.)
- June 3: Totto Osvold, 81, Norwegian radio broadcaster (born 1941)
- June 8:
  - Wade Goodwyn, 63, correspondent for NPR
  - Pat Robertson, 93, American radio station owner who transformed the Rural Radio Network into the Christian Broadcasting Network before moving to television (born 1930)
- June 12: Silvio Berlusconi, 86, Italian radio and television magnate and politician (born 1936) (main article: Death and state funeral of Silvio Berlusconi)
- June 18: Jellie Brouwer, 59, Dutch journalist and presenter (cancer)
- June 23: Jesse McReynolds, 93, American country musician and Grand Ole Opry regular since 1964 (born 1929)
- June 26: Dick Biondi, 90, American radio disc jockey best known for his work in Buffalo, New York and Chicago, Illinois (born 1932)
- June 27: Bobby Osborne, 91, American country musician (The Osborne Brothers, Rocky Top X-Press) and Grand Ole Opry regular (born 1931)
- July 5: Awa Ehoura, Ivorian journalist and radio host (age unknown)
- July 19: Frank Cody, 75, American radio executive (KTWV)
- August 7
  - Leonid Volodarskiy, 73, Russian translator, writer and radio presenter (born 1950)
  - Jim Price, 81, retired American baseball player (Detroit Tigers) and radio analyst (Detroit Tigers Radio Network).
- August 17: Rick Jeanneret, 81, Canadian-American play-by-play broadcaster for the Sabres Hockey Network from 1971 to 2022, also disc jockey for CJRN (born 1942)
- August 18: James L. Buckley, 100, American politician, President of Radio Free Europe from 1982 to 1985 (born 1923)
- August 23: Magdalena "Moodie Jam" Estrada, 66, Filipina disc jockey (born 1957)
- August 26: Tony Roberts, 94, American play-by-play broadcaster for the Notre Dame Fighting Irish football from 1980 to 2006 (born 1928)
- August 29: Mike Enriquez, 71, Filipino radio and television news anchor, GMA Network (born 1951)
- September 1: Jimmy Buffett, 76, American Gulf and Western singer-songwriter, founder of Radio Margaritaville (born 1946)
- September 8: Sašo Hribar, 63, Slovenian radio satirist and impressionist (heart attack)
- September 11: Dick Bertel, 92, announcer, news anchor, and media executive at WTIC (AM), NBC Radio Network, and the Voice of America - host of The Golden Age of Radio from 1970 - 1977, an oral history of network radio entertainment programming
- September 25: Jay de Castro, 46, former Filipino voice actor and dubbing director of ABS-CBN, former Filipino TV reporter of News5 and Filipino radio reporter of DZME 1530 Radyo Uno (born 1977)
- September 28: DJ Lalla, 34, Romanian DJ and radio presenter (drowned)
- October 21: Dusty Street, 77, American freeform/progressive disc jockey for KROQ and SiriusXM (born 1946)
- October 25: Jose "Richard" Enriquez Jr., 59, Filipino disc jockey (born 1964)
- November 5: Juan Jumalon, 56, Filipino journalist (born 1966; shot)
- November 13: Héctor Benavides, 82, Mexican news anchor and radio personality (born 1941)
- November 15: Ken Squier, 88, American broadcaster, founder of Motor Racing Network and owner of WDEV in Vermont
- November 18: Nan Witcomb, 95, Australian poet and radio broadcaster
- November 25: Clarke Ingram, 66, American broadcaster best known for his work in Pittsburgh, Pennsylvania
- November 27: Regi Espiritu, 54, Filipino journalist DZRH (born 1969)
- December 2: Maria Martin, 72, Mexican-American journalist and broadcaster (born 1951)
- December 16: Jim Ladd, 75, American freeform disc jockey (born 1948)
- December 21: Ian Punnett, 63, American talk radio host (Coast to Coast AM) (born 1960)
- December 22: Ruth Seymour, 88, American executive, general manager of KCRW from 1977 to 2010 (born 1935)

== See also ==
- 2023 in British radio
