= List of radio stations in Canterbury =

This is a list of radio stations in Canterbury, New Zealand.

During October 2010 several FM radio stations changed frequencies, since spacing was being standardised to 0.8 MHz. Frequency changes continue as broadcast licences are renewed. Most frequencies are now spaced 0.8 MHz apart, with the first station at a frequency of 88.9 MHz. Infill stations are allocated to the 0.4 MHz frequency in the buffer between two other stations.

The Canterbury earthquakes of 2010 and 2011 have allowed community stations to play a greater role in the Canterbury community. Compass FM 104.9 FM has existed as a not-for-profit community radio station in the North Canterbury area since June 2011. Several radio stations have also ceased operation as a result of the Canterbury earthquakes. In Lyttelton, for instance, Volcano Radio 88.5FM was broadcasting 80 shows commercial-free from February 2008, but the quakes damaged equipment and forced the building to be demolished. Shows on the station included Project Lyttelton, Monday Report, children's programme Lyttelease, classical music show Vienna Volcano, and old school metal and hard rock show The Molten Metal.

== Christchurch and North Canterbury stations ==
=== FM stations ===
The following stations broadcast in the Christchurch area including Sumner and the Hurunui District.

Most high-power FM radio stations serving Christchurch broadcast from the Sugarloaf transmitter, located on the Port Hills due south of the central city. Stations broadcasting from this transmitter also serve the majority of the Canterbury Plains, as far south as the Rangitata River. The suburb of Sumner is served by infill FM transmitters located at Southshore and Sumner Head, as hills block the signal from Sugarloaf.

Frequency (MHz)	Station	Location	Licensed kW	Format	Airdate	Previous stations on frequency
88.9	The Edge	Sugarloaf	32	Contemporary hit radio	2017	Broadcast on 89.0 MHz prior to 2008; 1999–2009 The Edge; 2010: George FM; 2011–2017: Mai FM
89.3	Radio Hauraki	Sumner	0.016	Alternative rock & Classic rock	2009	
89.7	RNZ Concert	Sugarloaf	80	Classical music	1984	
90.1	Coast	Southshore	0.8	Classic hits	2015	
90.5	Tahu FM	Sugarloaf	16	Urban contemporary & Iwi radio	1991	formerly Te Reo Iriraki O Otautahi, 90.5 Tahu FM, Mai FM
90.9	ZM	Sumner	0.016	Contemporary hit radio	2009	ZM was previously on 89.2 MHz in Sumner
91.3	ZM	Sugarloaf	80	Contemporary hit radio	1986	formerly ZMFM, 91ZM
91.7	iHeartCountry New Zealand	Sumner (Tuawera Tce)	0.08	Country	9 May 2025	2015–30 June 2020: Mix, 1 July 2020 – 9 May 2025: Gold
92.1	More FM	Sugarloaf	80	Adult contemporary music	1992	
92.9	The Sound	Sugarloaf	50	Classic rock	2001	formerly Solid Gold; 1986–2001: C93FM (formerly 93 Gold, Classic Hits 93FM)
93.3	Flava	Sumner (Tuawera Tce)	0.08	Urban contemporary	Jan 2023	2015–2020: Flava; 20 Jan 2020–12 Oct 2020: Pulzar FM; Oct 2020 – Jan 2023: Anthemz
93.7	The Rock	Sugarloaf	80	Active rock	1999	1992–1999: Radio Pacific
94.1	Life FM	Sumner (Tuawera Tce)	0.08	Contemporary Christian music	Sept 2023	
94.5	The Breeze	Sugarloaf	32	Adult contemporary music	1998	formerly Lite FM; 1994–1998: Easy Listening i94.5
94.9	More FM	Southshore	0.8	Adult contemporary music	1992	Broadcast on 95.3 MHz prior to 2009
95.3	George FM	Sugarloaf	32	Dance music	1 May 2023	2009–2017: The Edge; 2017 – 20 March 2022: Mai FM on 106.8 FM; 21/03/2022 – 30 March 2023: Today FM
96.1	The Sauce 96.1	Sugarloaf	16	Alternative Rap and Hip Hop	10 May 2026	Previous NZ Broadcasting School programmes: Kokako 96.1, Bassline 96.1, Waves 96.1, Rewind 96.1, 3/05-24/11/2021 Fever FM, Tracks 96.1, The 96.1, OKBoomer, The Garage, Rift, Basement, Embr, Summit, Chalk, Jacked, The Attic, Mode, Alpha, Splat, Blush
96.5	The Hits	Southshore	0.32	Adult contemporary music	2006	formerly Classic Hits 97.7
96.9	Plains FM	Sugarloaf	5	Access Radio	1988	
97.7	The Hits	Sugarloaf	80	Adult contemporary music	1991	formerly B98 FM, Classic Hits
98.5	RDU 98.5	synchronous transmission Marleys Hill, Ilam (backup transmitter), Sumner Head	1.6; 0.16; 0.01	Campus radio Alternative culture	1986	Broadcast on 90.5 MHz from 1986 to 1988 and 98.3 MHz from 1988 to 2002 previously Radio U, UFM
99.3	Breeze Classic	Sugarloaf	32	1970s	1 November 2025	1991–1992 99 More FM (moved to 92.1 MHz); 1993–1997: Life 99.3 MHz, 1997–1999: Southern Star; 1999–2005: Channel Z, 2005–2006: Kiwi FM; 2006–2019: Radio Live (simulcast on 99.3 MHz and 738 kHz since 2006 but moved to 99.3 MHz since 2015); Jan–30 Dec 2019: Magic Talk (moved to 738 kHz as at 30 December 2019); 30/12/2019–31 October 2025: Magic
99.7	RNZ Concert	Southshore	0.32	Classical music	1984	Broadcast on 99.9 MHz prior to 2010
100.1	Newstalk ZB	Sugarloaf	16	Talk radio	2011	
100.5	The Breeze	Lyttelton	0.1	Adult contemporary music	2021	Magic Talk, Magic Music
100.5	Brian FM	Sumner (Tuawera Tce)	0.08	Adult hits	Sep 2021	
100.9	Anthemz	Huntsbury Hill	5	Classic alternative	16 May 2023	2008–2020: Voice of South Pole; 28/09/2020–13 May 2023: Pulzar FM
101.7	RNZ National	Sugarloaf	16	Public radio	2004	
103.7	Compass FM	Cheviot (Beltana)	0.8	Community radio		
103.7	Compass FM	Hanmer (Wallace Peak)	0.32	Community radio		
104.1	PMN 531	Sugarloaf	16	Pacific radio	Jan 2019	2010–2019: Niu FM
104.5	More FM	Lyttelton	0.1	Adult contemporary music	2021	
104.9	Compass FM 104.9	Rangiora (Mt Grey)	2	Community radio	2011	
105.7	Coast	Sugarloaf	16	Classic hits	3 August 2020	2009 2009–2020: Pulzar FM; 20/01–02/08/2020: C105.7
106.1	Brian FM	Hanmer (Wallace Peak)	1.58	Adult hits	18 May 2022	
106.5	Radio Hauraki	Sugarloaf	16	Alternative rock & Classic rock	2008	

=== AM stations ===
Frequency (kHz)	Station	Location	Licensed kW	Format	Airdate	Previous stations on frequency
540	Vacant.	Philpotts Rd	3.2	Christian music	2015	2011–2015: The Word, Rhema 2015 till 12/11/2026.
612	Vacant	Philpotts Rd	10	Christian music	14 February 2025	Until 310726 Sanctuary, Until 14 February 2025: Star rebranded; Rhema
675	RNZ National	Gebbies Pass	63	Public radio		3YA (3YA was also broadcast on 980 kHz, 720 kHz and 690 kHz prior to Nov 1978)
738	Vacant	Marshland	16			1999–2005: Radio Pacific; 2005–2015: Radio Live (simulcast on 99.3 MHz and 738 kHz since 2006 but moved to 99.3 MHz from 2015 until 30 December 2019); Jan–30 Dec 2019: Magic Music (moved to 99.3 MHz as at 30 December 2019); 30/12/2019–20 March 2022: Magic Talk; 21/03/2022–30 March 2023: Today FM; 31 March 2023 – April 2026: The Breeze
963	AM Network & RNZ National	Gebbies Pass	32	Talk & Parlament	1990s	Until 14 February 2025: Star, Then Sanctuary till 310726 rebranded
1017	Vacant	Philpotts Rd	6.3			2000–2002: Canterbury On Air, Now AM; 2003–2010: Radio Hauraki 2011–2026: Newstalk ZB
1098	Newstalk ZB	Bottle Lake	16	Talk radio	1994	Until 1994: 3ZB
1260	Sport Nation	Marshland	6.3	Sports radio	19 November 2024	1973–1990: Radio Avon; 1990–1999: C93FM; 1999–2001: Solid Gold; 2001–2004: Lite FM; 2004–2005 The Breeze; 2005–2007: Radio Pacific/Trackside; 2007–2010: BSport/Radio Trackside 2010–2015: LiveSport/Radio Trackside 2015–2020: TAB Trackside 2021–2024: SENZ
1413	Radio Ferrymead	Ferrymead Park	0.32	Oldies	1980s	
1503	Rhema	Bottle Lake	16			1980s – mid 1990s: New Zealand's Rhema; 1994 – March 2020: Radio Sport formerly Sports Roundup; 30 March–30 June 2020: Newstalk ZB; 01/07/2020-04/05/2026: Gold Sport; 31/08/2026-present: Rhema
1593	Vacant	Philpotts Rd	16			Late 1990s: 88 Country, 2001–2003: The Wolf; 2003–2004: Easy Listening i 2004–2026: Coast

=== Low-power FM stations ===
There are a number of LPFM stations that are operating, or have operated, whose broadcast range may be less than that of the full-power FM stations. There are internet radio broadcasting stations that serve from the area.

Frequency (MHz)	Station	Location	Format	Airdate	Previous frequency/Radio name
87.6	Life FM	Christchurch	Contemporary Christian music	2011	
87.8	Power Hit FM	Christchurch	Hit music, pop music, dance music	2005	
87.8	dead carrier	Christchurch			Radio Tarana
87.9	BenFM	Rangiora	Classic hits	2026	Radio La Famia, Ashgrove FM, The Basement
88.0	Bible reading & Christian music	Christchurch	Christian contemporary	2024	Country FM, 2011: Shakey FM, Rollywood FM, 2013–2020: Flava; 20 Jan 2020 – 12 Oct 2020: Pulzar FM.
88.0	Seaside Sounds	New Brighton	Community radio	2020	New Brighton Wassup
88.1	Harmony FM	Riccarton	Christian radio	2010	
88.2	Absolute Live FM	Rolleston	Adult contemporary	2025	
88.3	The Fridge	Christchurch	Student radio	2018	Rollywood FM, The Wave
88.3	Racing Commentary	Christchurch	Euromarque Motorsport Park	2009	
106.8	Mai FM	Sugarloaf	Urban contemporary	21 March 2022	
106.9	Gospel Radio	Kaiapoi	Community radio	Was 107.3 MHz.	
106.9	ceased	Rangiora			Life FM
107.0	Thunder FM	Rolleston/Lincoln	Contemporary hit radio		
107.2	JUST FM	Kaiapoi	Community radio	1998	
107.2	Life Talk Radio	Christchurch	Community radio	October 2026	
107.3	XS80's	Huntsbury Hill	1980s	2015	
107.4	1074BFM	Waitikiri Burwood North East	70s, 80s, 90s	2018	
107.5	Radio Addington	Addington		2010	
107.5	Radio Redwood	Redwood			
107.5	Practice FM	CBD, NZ Broadcasting School	Various		
107.5	Southbrook FM	Rangiora	Student radio		
107.5	Racing Commentary	Christchurch	Ruapuna Speedway		
107.6	Radio Aotearoa	Christchurch		2025	
107.7	Outback FM	Kaiapoi	Community radio		
107.7	ChizzySoundz	Chisnallwood Intermediate School		2010	
107.7	Rotten Radio	Lyttelton			2013: Flava
107.7	Anthemz	Christchurch	Urban contemporary	12 October 2020	20 Jan 2020–12 Oct 2020: Pulzar FM

=== Internet stations ===
Presence	Station	Location	Format	Airdate	Comments
Streaming	Live FM	Christchurch	Live Sinhala Hits	2016	
Streaming	Classic Radio	Christchurch	Sinhala Classical Hits	2018	
Streaming	Sky Radio	Christchurch	EDM, Dance, House, Top 40	2020	
Streaming	WoW Radio	Christchurch	Sinhala Hits, Dance, Top 40	2021	
Streaming	Radio Gold	Christchurch	Oldies	2022	
Streaming	Lassana Radio	Christchurch	Sinhala Oldies	2023	
Streaming	PitaRata Radio	Christchurch	Sinhala Various	2024	

== Banks Peninsula stations ==
The following stations broadcast in Akaroa or the Banks Peninsula area.

Frequency (MHz)	Station	Format	Location (transmitter)	Licensed kW	Airdate	Previous stations on frequency
90.3	Akaroa World Radio		Akaroa	0.1		
91.1			Hilltop	0.3		Akaroa Radio
95.1	RNZ Concert	Classical music	Mt Pearce	1.25		
95.9			Long Bay Road	0.3		XS80s
99.1	More FM	Adult hits	Mt Pearce	0.8		
107.3		LPFM	Akaroa	0.001		Bay Radio

== Mid Canterbury FM stations ==
The following stations broadcast in the Ashburton or Mid Canterbury area.

Frequency (MHz)	Station	Format	Location	Licensed kW	Airdate	Previous stations on frequency
89.3	The Hits	Adult contemporary music	Ashburton (Somerset House)	0.16	2001	formerly known as Classic Hits, 3ZE
91.7	Life FM	Contemporary Christian music	Ashburton	0.16		
92.5	Hokonui	Adult contemporary music	Ashburton (Winchmore)	8	2014	2001–2014: The Hits (formerly known as Classic Hits, 3ZE)
93.3	The Edge	Contemporary hit radio	Ashburton (Electricity Ashburton)	0.16	2002	
94.1	Mt Hutt Radio		Mt Hutt Ski Field	0.16		
94.9	More FM	Adult contemporary music	Ashburton (Surrey Hills)	8	28 April 2018	Port FM, Fox FM
95.7	The Sound	Classic rock	Ashburton (Electricity Ashburton)	0.16	2002	formerly Solid Gold
96.5	Hokonui	Adult contemporary music	Ashburton (Somerset House)	0.16		2001–2014: The Hits (formerly known as Classic Hits, 3ZE)
97.3	The Rock	Active rock	Ashburton (Electricity Ashburton)	0.16	2002	
98.1	Newstalk ZB	Talk radio	Ashburton (Somerset House)	0.16		
98.9	More FM	Adult contemporary music	Ashburton (Electricity Ashburton)	0.16	28 April 2018	Port FM, Fox FM
99.7	Brian FM	Adult hits	Ashburton (Gawler Downs)	8		
101.3	RNZ National	Public radio	Ashburton (Gawler Downs)	8	2004	
103.7	Breeze Classic	1970s	Ashburton (Electricity Ashburton)	0.16	1 November 2025	2017–31 October 2025: Magic
105.3	Brian FM	Adult hits	Mt Hutt	0.32	March 2020	Can be heard in Christchurch and North Canterbury.
106.1	The Breeze	Adult contemporary music	Ashburton (Electricity Ashburton)	0.16	2018	2017 – March 2018 XS80s

== Mid Canterbury AM stations ==
Frequency (kHz)	Station	Format	Location	Licensed kW	Airdate	Previous stations on frequency
702	iHeartCountry	Country music	Ashburton (Winchmore)	3.1	4 May 2026	Until March 2020: Radio Sport; 30/03 – 30 June 2020: Newstalk ZB; 01/07/2020-04/05/2026: Gold Sport
873	Newstalk ZB	Talk radio	Ashburton (Winchmore)	3.1	2001	Until 2001: 3ZE
1071	Sport Nation	Sports radio	Ashburton (Winchmore)	6.3	19 July 2024	Until 2020: TAB Trackside; 2021–2024: SENZ

== South Canterbury FM stations ==
Frequency (MHz)	Station	Format	Location (transmitter)	Licensed kW	Airdate	Previous stations on frequency
89.1	Tahu FM	Urban contemporary & Iwi radio	Timaru (Cave Hill)	5	2000	
89.4	More FM	Adult contemporary music	Twizel	1	28 April 2018	2017–2018: Port FM
89.9	The Breeze	Adult contemporary music	Timaru (Mt Horrible)	8	2018	1992 – March 2018: Radio Live
90.2	Hospital FM		Fairlie	0.1		
90.7	The Sound	Classic rock	Timaru (Tower Corp Building)	0.1		
90.9	More FM	Adult contemporary music	Omarama (Cloud Hill)	0.05	28 April 2018	Port FM
91.0	The Rock	Active rock	Twizel (Mt Mary)	0.5		20 March 2022: Magic Talk; 21/03/2022 – 30 March 2023: Today FM
91.5	The Rock	Active rock	Timaru (Mt Horrible)	8	2001	
91.8	Radio Rhema	Christian radio	Twizel (ECNZ)	1		
92.3	The Breeze	Adult contemporary music	Timaru (Tower Corp Building)	0.1		The Edge, The Groove, The Heat FM
92.6			Twizel (Mt Mary)	0.08		until June 2024: RNZ National
93.1	More FM	Adult contemporary music	Timaru (Tower Corp Building) Waimate (Mt Ellen)	0.1	28 April 2018	Port FM
93.4	RNZ National	Public radio	Tekapo (Mt John)	0.1		
93.9	Brian FM	Adult hits	Timaru (Cave Hill)	1	April 2018	
94.2	More FM	Adult contemporary music	Twizel (Mt Mary)	0.5	28 April 2018	Port FM
94.7	The Hits	Adult contemporary music	Timaru (Rhodestown)	0.1		
95.0	More FM	Adult contemporary music	Fairlie (Mt Michael)	1.6	28 April 2018	Port FM
95.5	The Edge	Contemporary hit radio	Timaru (Mt Horrible)	8	2001	
95.8	Radio Twizel	Community radio	Twizel	0.08		
96.3	ZM	Contemporary hit radio	Timaru (Cave Hill)	5	2004	
97.1	The Sound	Classic rock	Timaru (Mt Horrible)	8	2001	formerly Solid Gold
97.3	RNZ National	Public radio	Omarama (Cloud Hill)	0.008		
97.4	Brian FM	Adult hits	Fairlie	1.0		
97.9	More FM	Adult contemporary music	Timaru (Mt Horrible)	8	28 April 2018	Port FM
98.7	The Hits	Adult contemporary music	Timaru (Mt Studholme)	3.2	1995	formerly Classic Hits, 99FM, Radio Caroline; Broadcasting on 99.0 MHz prior to 2010
98.9	The Breeze	Adult contemporary music	Omarama (Cloud Hill)	0.05	28 April 2018	The Edge
99.5	RNZ Concert	Classical music	Timaru (Mt Studholme)	5		
99.8	The Breeze	Adult contemporary music (1980s–2010s)	Twizel (Mt Mary)	1		
100.3	100.3FM South Canterbury	80s 90s 2000s anthems	Timaru (Cave Hill)	2.5	2018	Kiwi access 100.3
101.1	RNZ National	Public radio	Timaru (Mt Studholme)	3.2		
103.5	Breeze Classic	1970s	Timaru (Mt Horrible)	8	1 November 2025	2017 – 31 October 2025: Magic
104.3	Radio Rhema	Christian radio	Timaru (Cave Hill)	5		
104.5	Brian FM	Adult hits	Omarama	0.1	2018	2014–2018: High Country FM
104.6	The Sound	Classic rock	Fairlie (Mt Michael)	1.6		
105.1	Life FM	Contemporary Christian music	Timaru (Cave Hill)	5		
105.4	Brian FM	Adult hits	Twizel (Mt Mary)	0.5	22 December 2020	Previously 99.0 FM March 2020 to 22 December 2020; The Hits (formerly Classic Hits, 99FM, Radio Caroline)
105.9	Channel X	Classic alternative	Timaru (Mt Horrible)	8	8 May 2023	2017 – March 2018: XS80s; 20 March 2022: Magic Talk; 21/03/2022 – 30 March 2023: Today FM
106.2	100.3 South Canterbury	80's 90's 2000's	Fairlie	0.04		

=== South Canterbury AM stations ===
Frequency (kHz)	Station	Format	Location (transmitter)	Licensed kW	Airdate	Previous stations on frequency
594	Sanctuary	Christian radio	Timaru (St Andrews)	15.8	14 February 2025	Until 14 February 2025: Star rebranded
918	RNZ National	Public radio	Timaru (Fairview)	8		
981			Timaru (St Andrews)			2015–Southern Star; 2018: Coast
1152	Newstalk ZB	Talk radio	Timaru (Fairview)	15.8	2001	1949–2001: Radio Caroline, Classic Hits 99FM
1242	Sport Nation	Sports radio	Timaru (Fairview)	1.6	19 November 2024	2005–2020: TAB Trackside formerly LiveSport, BSport, Radio Pacific, 2021–2024: SENZ
1494	iHeartCountry	Country music	Timaru (St Andrews)	8	4 May 2026	Until March 2020: Radio Sport; 30/03–30 June 2020: Newstalk ZB; 01/07/2020-04/05/2026: Gold Sport

=== South Canterbury low-power FM stations ===
Frequency (MHz)	Station	Format	Location (transmitter)	Licensed kW	Airdate	Previous stations on frequency
87.7	Waimate Community Radio	Music from 50's to now	Waimate	0.001		
88.0	Hospital FM	LPFM	Timaru	0.001		
88.4	no longer licensed LPFM		Timaru			Hospital FM
106.7	Just Country FM	LPFM	Timaru	0.001		
107.0	100.3 FM South Canterbury		Timaru	0.001		XS80s
107.5	Hospital FM	LPFM	Timaru	0.001		
