= Good Music =

Good Music may refer to:

- GOOD Music, a management and production company founded by Kanye West
- Good Music 107.5FM, a former radio station in Christchurch, New Zealand
- Good Music (Joan Jett and the Blackhearts album), 1986
- Good Music (Murs album), 1999
- Easy listening, an alternative name

== See also ==
- Music taste
