= Rangiora =

Town in Canterbury, New Zealand

- Secondary urban area
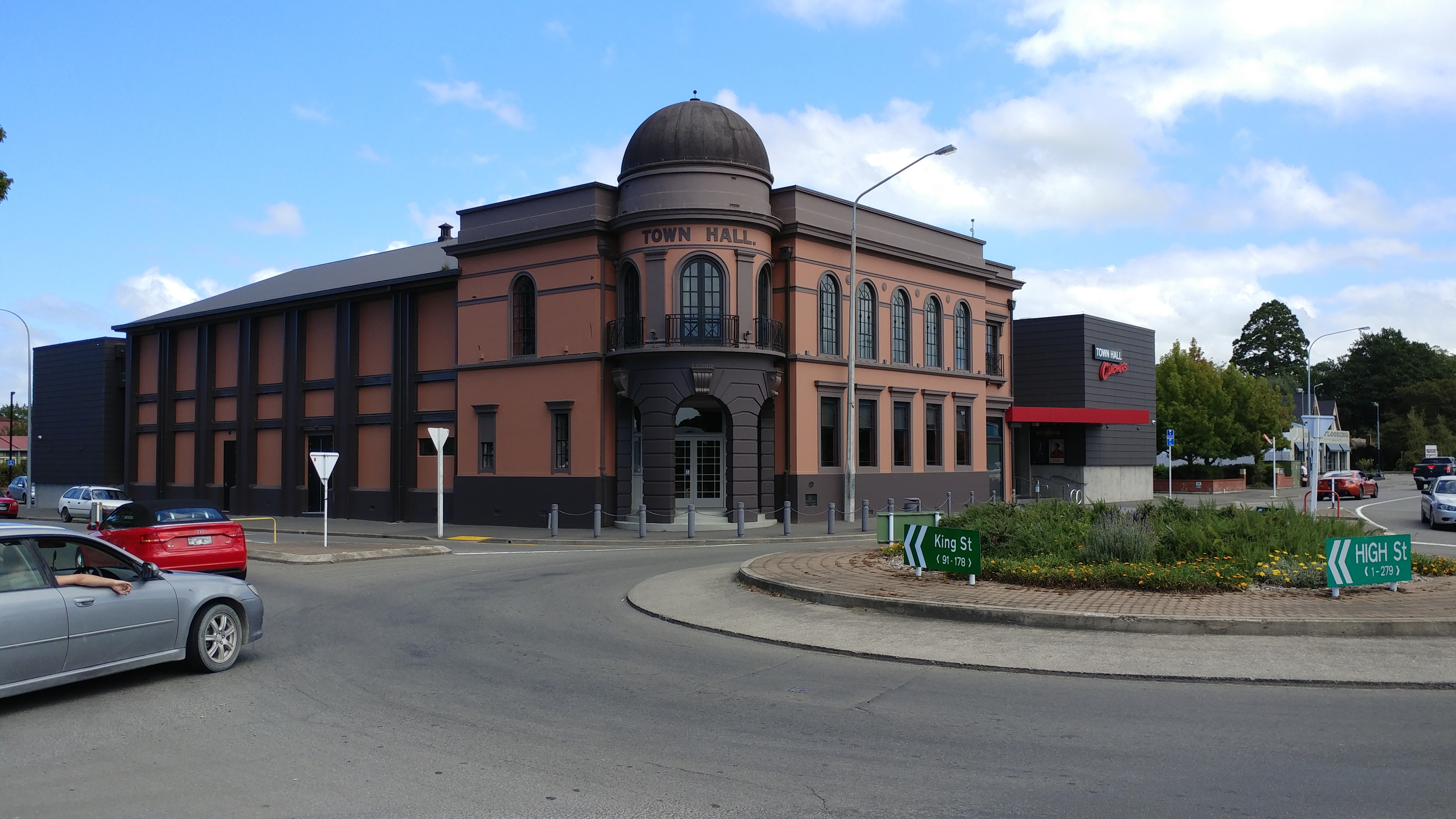
- Rangiora's town hall in 2018
- Interactive map of Rangiora
- Coordinates: 43.3034°S 172.5914°E
- Country: New Zealand
- Region: Canterbury
- Territorial authority: Waimakariri District
- Ward: Rangiora-Ashley Ward
- Community: Rangiora-Ashley Community
- Electorates: Waimakariri; Te Tai Tonga (Māori)

Government
  - Territorial Authority: Waimakariri District Council
  - Regional council: Environment Canterbury
  - Mayor of Waimakariri: Dan Gordon
  - Waimakariri MP: Matt Doocey
  - Te Tai Tonga MP: Mananui Ramsden

Area
  - Total: 17.70 km^{2} (6.83 sq mi)

Population (June 2025)
  - Total: 19,300
  - Density: 1,090/km^{2} (2,820/sq mi)
- Postcode(s): 7400

Rangiora is the largest town and seat of the Waimakariri District, in Canterbury, New Zealand. It is 29 kilometres (18 mi) north of Christchurch, and is part of the Christchurch metropolitan area. With an estimated population of 19,300 (as of June 2025), Rangiora is the 30th largest urban area in New Zealand, and the fifth-largest in the Canterbury region (behind Christchurch, Timaru, Ashburton and Rolleston).

== Toponymy ==
The name of the town comes from the Māori language. The components of the name are rangi (meaning sky) and ora (meaning wellness). The name can be interpreted as meaning "good weather", "a sick person recovering from an illness", or "a day of wellbeing." The origin of the name is not clear, but may originate with the Māori name for Brachyglottis repanda, or refer to a peace agreement between Ngāi Tahu and Kāti Māmoe.

The town is often nicknamed "Goon" by locals. The origin of the nickname is unclear, but one possibility is that it's a contraction of the name Rangoon, which was the romanised name of Myanmar's largest city Yangon during its time as a British colony. The theory is that European locals were familiar with the name Rangoon, and found that easier to pronounce than the Māori language name. Other theories include associations to the word 'goon' (a synonym of henchman), or the colloquial Australasian name for box wine.

== Geography ==
Rangiora is 29 kilometres (18 mi) north of Christchurch's Cathedral Square or 20 minutes drive north of the Christchurch International Airport. It is close to the northern end of Canterbury's Inland Scenic Route (formerly State Highway 72), which skirts the inner edge of the Canterbury Plains, running southwest to Timaru via Oxford and Geraldine. The Ashley River / Rakahuri is just to the north of the town.

=== Climate ===
Rangiora has an oceanic climate, (Cfb according to the Köppen climate classification), with warm summers and cool winters. Rangiora has an average annual mean of 11.5 °C (52.7 °F), an average annual high of 17.1 °C (62.8 °F) and an average annual low of 6.0 °C (42.8 °F). January, the warmest month, has a mean of 16.7 °C (62.1 °F) and an average high of 22.1 °C (71.8 °F), while the coolest month, July, has a mean of 6.1 °C (43.0 °F) and an average low of 0.6 °C (33.1 °F).

Rangiora receives 575.1 millimetres (22.64 in) of precipitation annually over 83.0 precipitation days, which is quite dry compared to some other cities in New Zealand. The wettest month is April, which receives 58.0 millimetres (2.28 in) and the most precipitation on average over 7.7 precipitation days is a tie between June and July. The driest month is September, which receives 34.1 millimetres (1.34 in) over 6.0 precipitation days while the least amount of precipitation is February. Rangiora receives 2191.7 hours of sunshine annually, with winter being less sunny compared to summer. November is the sunniest month, receiving 232.0 hours of sunshine on average, while June is the least sunniest month, receiving 125.0 hours of sunshine on average.

The highest official temperature ever recorded in New Zealand was 42.4 °C (108.3 °F) at Rangiora on 7 February 1973.

Climate data for Rangiora (1991–2020 normals, extremes 1965–present)
Month	Jan	Feb	Mar	Apr	May	Jun	Jul	Aug	Sep	Oct	Nov	Dec	Year
Record high °C (°F)	35.9 (96.6)	42.4 (108.3)	35.5 (95.9)	29.9 (85.8)	28.3 (82.9)	22.9 (73.2)	22.6 (72.7)	23.3 (73.9)	26.4 (79.5)	29.0 (84.2)	31.7 (89.1)	32.8 (91.0)	42.4 (108.3)
Mean daily maximum °C (°F)	22.1 (71.8)	21.9 (71.4)	20.2 (68.4)	17.5 (63.5)	15.1 (59.2)	12.3 (54.1)	11.6 (52.9)	12.9 (55.2)	15.2 (59.4)	16.8 (62.2)	18.5 (65.3)	20.6 (69.1)	17.1 (62.8)
Daily mean °C (°F)	16.7 (62.1)	16.5 (61.7)	14.6 (58.3)	11.9 (53.4)	9.4 (48.9)	6.7 (44.1)	6.1 (43.0)	7.5 (45.5)	9.5 (49.1)	11.2 (52.2)	12.9 (55.2)	15.3 (59.5)	11.5 (52.7)
Mean daily minimum °C (°F)	11.4 (52.5)	11.1 (52.0)	9.0 (48.2)	6.2 (43.2)	3.7 (38.7)	1.2 (34.2)	0.6 (33.1)	2.1 (35.8)	3.9 (39.0)	5.6 (42.1)	7.4 (45.3)	9.9 (49.8)	6.0 (42.8)
Record low °C (°F)	3.3 (37.9)	1.6 (34.9)	−2.2 (28.0)	−3.1 (26.4)	−5.6 (21.9)	−6.6 (20.1)	−7.6 (18.3)	−5.8 (21.6)	−4.2 (24.4)	−3.0 (26.6)	−2.1 (28.2)	0.4 (32.7)	−7.6 (18.3)
Average rainfall mm (inches)	44.8 (1.76)	42.8 (1.69)	37.6 (1.48)	58.0 (2.28)	54.4 (2.14)	51.6 (2.03)	54.0 (2.13)	49.0 (1.93)	34.1 (1.34)	55.5 (2.19)	46.0 (1.81)	47.3 (1.86)	575.1 (22.64)
Average rainy days (≥ 1.0 mm)	6.2	6.0	6.5	6.8	7.1	7.7	7.7	7.2	6.3	7.2	6.9	7.1	83.0
Average relative humidity (%) (at 9am)	63.7	69.0	69.3	71.6	72.8	73.8	74.1	71.8	67.4	65.7	63.6	63.6	68.9
Mean monthly sunshine hours	228.4	202.5	183.9	153.4	147.7	125.0	139.1	161.8	181.1	220.4	232.0	216.4	2,191.7
Source: NIWA (humidity 1972–2015, precipitation days 1965–2015)

== Population ==
Rangiora is described by Stats NZ as a medium urban area and covers 17.70 km^{2} (6.83 sq mi). It had an estimated population of 19,300 as of June 2025, with a population density of 1,090 people per km^{2}.

Historical population
Year	Pop.	±% p.a.
2006	12,165	—
2013	15,129	+3.16%
2018	17,898	+3.42%
2023	18,855	+1.05%
The 2006 population is for a smaller area of 15.25 km^{2}. Source:

Rangiora had a population of 18,855 in the 2023 New Zealand census, an increase of 957 people (5.3%) since the 2018 census, and an increase of 3,726 people (24.6%) since the 2013 census. There were 8,865 males, 9,942 females, and 51 people of other genders in 7,728 dwellings. 2.5% of people identified as LGBTIQ+. The median age was 46.9 years (compared with 38.1 years nationally). There were 3,117 people (16.5%) aged under 15 years, 2,859 (15.2%) aged 15 to 29, 7,656 (40.6%) aged 30 to 64, and 5,226 (27.7%) aged 65 or older.

People could identify as more than one ethnicity. The results were 93.2% European (Pākehā); 8.8% Māori; 1.4% Pasifika; 3.6% Asian; 0.6% Middle Eastern, Latin American and African New Zealanders (MELAA); and 2.2% other, which includes people giving their ethnicity as "New Zealander". English was spoken by 97.8%, Māori by 1.8%, Samoan by 0.1%, and other languages by 5.8%. No language could be spoken by 1.8% (e.g. too young to talk). New Zealand Sign Language was known by 0.6%. The percentage of people born overseas was 17.6, compared with 28.8% nationally.

Religious affiliations were 35.7% Christian, 0.6% Hindu, 0.2% Islam, 0.3% Māori religious beliefs, 0.2% Buddhist, 0.4% New Age, 0.1% Jewish, and 1.1% other religions. People who answered that they had no religion were 54.2%, and 7.4% of people did not answer the census question.

Of those at least 15 years old, 2,430 (15.4%) people had a bachelor's or higher degree, 9,126 (58.0%) had a post-high school certificate or diploma, and 4,182 (26.6%) people exclusively held high school qualifications. The median income was $35,500, compared with $41,500 nationally. 1,329 people (8.4%) earned over $100,000 compared to 12.1% nationally. The employment status of those at least 15 was 6,801 (43.2%) full-time, 2,199 (14.0%) part-time, and 282 (1.8%) unemployed.

Individual statistical areas
Name	Area (km^{2})	Population	Density (per km^{2})	Dwellings	Median age	Median income
Rangiora North West	1.99	2,739	1,376	1,248	58.8 years	$31,200
Kingsbury	2.58	2,685	1,041	1,083	53.9 years	$34,000
Ashgrove	0.67	1,494	2,230	585	39.6 years	$39,100
Rangiora North East	2.02	1,743	863	780	44.9 years	$32,000
Oxford Estate	0.94	1,248	1,328	462	45.4 years	$38,600
Rangiora Central	0.37	33	89	24	56.7 years	$36,800
Rangiora South West	1.96	2,499	1,275	984	40.8 years	$40,800
Lilybrook	1.26	2,892	2,295	1,203	44.1 years	$33,000
Rangiora South East	2.67	2,706	1,013	1,065	44.1 years	$38,200
Southbrook	3.24	816	3.24	291	36.2 years	$38,900
New Zealand					38.1 years	$41,500

== Attractions ==
Rangiora has become a gateway for local wineries, which have become popular in North Canterbury and, around Rangiora, there are a number to choose from. For more than twenty years the Rangiora Showgrounds has hosted an annual "petrol-head" show called Street Machines and Muscle Car Madness which features a large array of vehicles.

In 1956, Rangiora hosted New Zealand's first traction engine rally at the Rangiora Showgrounds. Eight traction engines, owned by members of the Southbrook Traction Engine Club, attended. In 2006, this notable milestone was celebrated by the arrival of visiting Burrell showman's engine Quo Vadis and accompanying carousel Gallopers Abreast from England to attend the celebrations.

Victoria Park in Percival St was established in 1902 by the council and the gates erected to mark King Edward VII's coronation. The band rotunda opened in 1907. The gates and rotunda are both Category 2 historic places.

== Sports ==
Rangiora Football has undergone strong growth recently. The Mainpower Oval has hosted many national cricket matches and is also used by Canterbury Country cricket as its base. Rangiora High School has produced many excellent sportspeople in rugby, basketball, netball, athletics, and rowing in recent years. Former All Black captain Todd Blackadder and former Silver Fern player and Tall Fern captain Donna Loffhagen both attended Rangiora High School. Since 2023, the Mainland Tactix have used Mainpower Stadium as an occasional venue in the ANZ Premiership.

== Culture ==
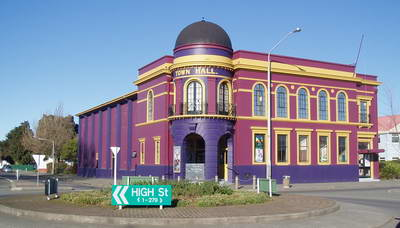
Rangiora Town Hall and Regent Cinema

Rangiora boasts two theatre companies: The North Canterbury Musical Society and The Rangiora Players. There are also a number of music, dance and drama schools based in the town, including the Hartley School of Performing Arts. The Regent Cinema, which opened in 1926, was located within the historic Rangiora Town Hall from its opening in 1926 as Everybodys' Cinema until December 2012 when the Town Hall was closed. There were also screenings in the larger auditorium which also hosted live shows and youth events.

The studios of radio station Compass FM 104.9 are situated in Rangiora. Compass FM 104.9 is a not-for-profit community station covering the North Canterbury region of New Zealand. From a transmitter atop Mount Grey, the station can be heard over much of North Canterbury, including the Waimakariri District, much of the Hurunui District and Selwyn District, and in greater Christchurch.

=== Rangiora Town Hall ===
The Rangiora Town Hall was designed by Henry St. Aubyn Murray on the behalf of the Rangiora Borough Council, and built by F. Williamson of Christchurch at a cost of £10,850 NZP. Construction began in 1925, and the Hall was opened on 27 May 1926 by the Mayoress of the Rangiora Borough, Mrs Robina McIntosh. Seating 600, the main hall was designed to host both moving pictures, and also live performances from around the district. The original Rangiora Public Library was located on the first-floor along the northern (High Street) frontage. Originally the Rangiora Borough Council resolved to spend only £6,500 to build and furnish the hall, was obliged to loan some £8,000 from the Christchurch Tramway Board to finance the construction of the hall, outraging residents at the prospects of having to pay increased rates. The interior furnishings were paid for using the insurance monies from the Institute Hall, which had been burned down in 1926.

The building originally housed the Everybodys Theatre, from 1931 the Regent Theatre. The former ticket windows were located on either side of the main doors; these are still extant, though the windows have since been replaced with single panes of glass, and the internal walls of one of the ticket offices has been removed. The Hall also housed the library from 1926 to 1967, when it moved to the former Council Chambers. The Rangiora Borough Council occupied the former library space from 1967 to 1981, when the present Council offices were opened on the (former) Institute Hall property.

The building has been altered very few times since it was originally built. In the early 1970s, the building was altered by pushing the rear wall of the auditorium in, which resulted in the loss of 200 seats and reducing the current capacity to the present level of 380. With the introduction of television and video, the former library on the first-floor was converted in 1983 into a smaller second theatre, designed solely as a movie theatre, and which opened with the movie Star Wars: Return of the Jedi. The main theatre was still capable of showing movies as required, and the original projection room was still in place to facilitate hire of the main hall to show movies for special occasions until September 2013. The building has been shut down twice for work to be carried out; in 1999 access was improved to the fly floors and the present lighting gantry installed, and in 2009 the building received an electrical re-wire and the interior was refurbished.

At some point in the 1920s-1930s, two properties adjacent to the Town Hall along High Street were demolished, and the site turned into the Town Hall Reserve; this property separates the Town Hall and the Police Station, built in 1999 to replace another station that had become inadequate. There is also a small carpark to the south of the building, behind the stage area. This carpark also has a loading dock that leads directly into the stage right wing, allowing backdrops and other properties to be brought into the building.

In September 2010, the Town Hall was damaged by the 4 September earthquake. The last group to use the Town Hall was the Rangiora New Life School, whose Secondary students had performed Exodus - The Musical (written by Christopher Tambling and Michael Forster) over the week of 25–27 August. The building was out of service until mid-2011, when it was reopened for use again. While it had been undergoing repairs at the time of the 22 February earthquake, the building thankfully did not sustain any further damage, which would have prolonged the time required for repairs.

The first show to use the restored facility was the North Canterbury Musical Society with their performance of Guys and Dolls in June 2011. While the Hall appeared to be in good condition, it was later found by engineers to be below the 33% structural integrity requirements of the New Building Standards code introduced after the Canterbury earthquakes. In December 2011, Council engineers closed the Hall, necessitating the closure of the Regent Theatre, located in the former library.

The Regent Theatre, operated by Patrick Walsh, was relocated to the Waikari Town Hall, a temporary move which was later made permanent by the cancellation of Walsh's concession to operate the movie theatre in mid-2013. After Walsh stripped out his cinema, contractors Naylor Love began work on 16 September 2013 to demolish internal walls as part of a new Performing Arts centre, due to cost $10.9m NZD. Walsh's cinema closed on 31 October 2013 and he purchased the Geraldine Cinema in 2014.

The refurbished Town Hall was officially opened on 7 March 2015 by Waimakariri District mayor David Ayers, with the Rangiora Brass Band providing a short concert afterwards. The refurbished facility consists of the main auditorium seating 361 patrons, a multi-purpose hall seating 150, and two small cinemas. The multi-use hall is also equipped with cinema equipment, permitting three movies to be presented simultaneously. The cinema facility is branded "Town Hall Cinemas". In addition, the facility also houses four "studios", which are used by the North Canterbury Academy of Music for music teaching purposes for 36 weeks each year. There is also a function room and a green room.

The Rangiora Town Hall was registered by the Historic Places Trust as a Category II historic place on 6 September 1984. The Rangiora Town Hall is also listed on the council's Landmarks scheme. It received its Landmark status on 27 May 2010.

=== Heritage Precinct ===
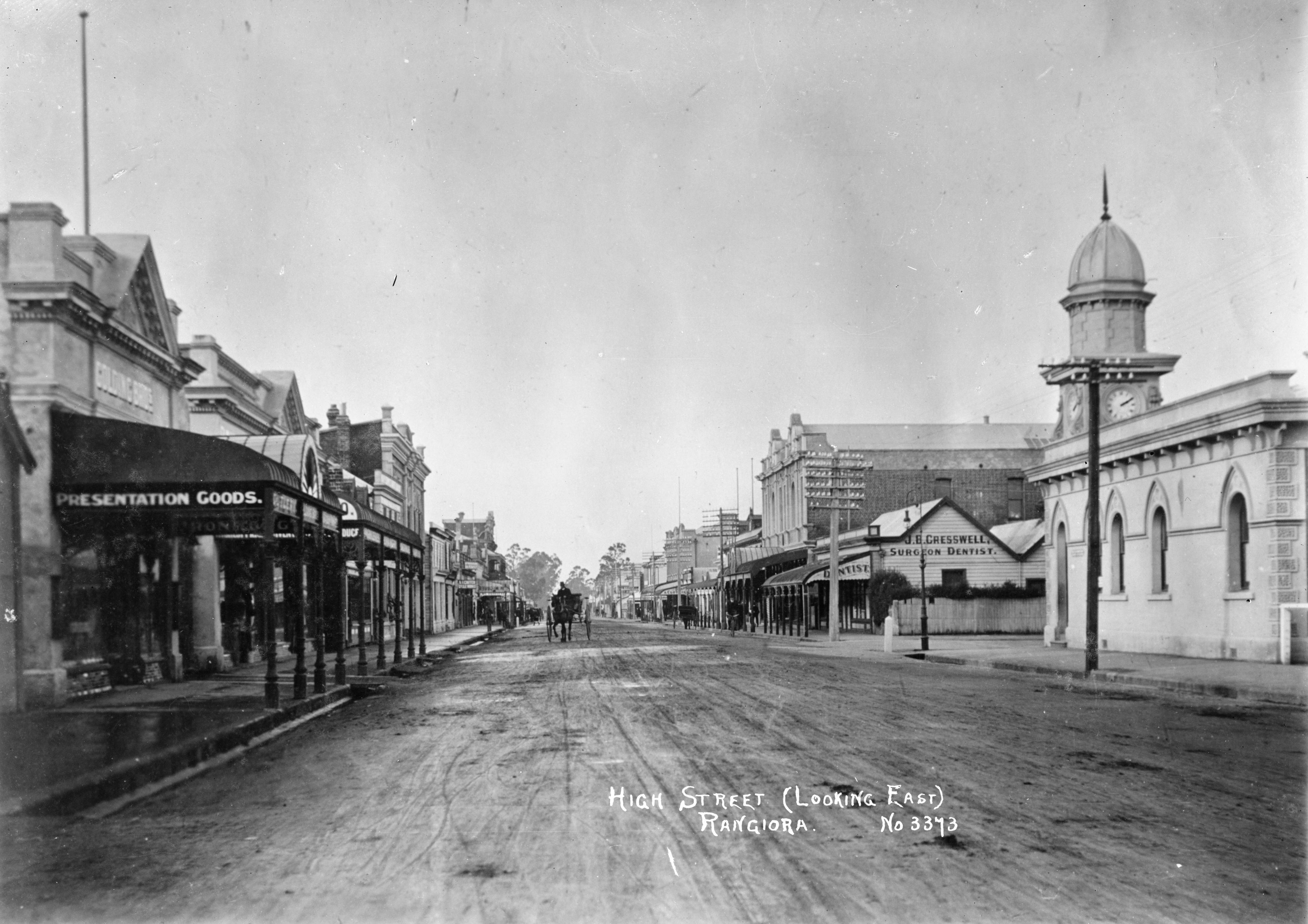
High Street circa 1910s

Unofficially the High Street of Rangiora stretching from the Rangiora Town Hall at King Street up to Ashley Street is a 'heritage precinct' due to the presence of many historic buildings. Among them are the former Junction Hotel (1880), the Post Office (1936), the Farmers building (1919) and the Johnston Building (1896). Some of these buildings are listed under the council's Landmarks heritage scheme, along with the Town Hall.

Due to the September 2010 and February 2011 earthquakes, several buildings have been fenced off due to safety concerns. This has caused people to go elsewhere for shopping, thus 'killing' High Street. In 2012, it was confirmed that one non-heritage registered building, the Lamberts Building, would be demolished, while the fate of others remains unknown. The building was demolished in August 2012. Several notable items recovered during the work were donated by the contractor to the Rangiora Museum.

The fate of the former Junction Hotel (1880) and the neighbouring Pulley's Building (1923) was presently unknown as of September 2012. The lessor of a restaurant operating from the Junction Hotel has indicated an interest in purchasing the two properties and demolishing them to build a more modern structure. The Farmers building (1919), having initially survived the earthquakes, was demolished over July and August 2014. One other non-heritage building, formerly home to Paper Plus and Toyworld, has been demolished because it was earthquake-prone.

Since then, demolition work has begun on the Pulley's Building which was demolished on Thursday 28 February 2013. The fate of the Junction Hotel is yet undecided, necessitating the fence containing the structure to be left in place for the time being. The Farmers building is currently undergoing a thorough audit due to discrepancies in the owner's report and in the report commissioned by the insurers. It is believed that more buildings may be demolished due to the costs of strengthening the buildings to meet structural requirements, and also to restore them as necessary.

== Museums ==
Rangiora is home to its own museum, located next to the Rangiora Bowling Club at 29 Good Street. This museum constitutes the upper floor of the former BNZ bank building that was located on Rangiora's High Street and shifted on to the current site in 1967. It contains items of historical interest from around the district. Later an extension consisting of a large display area and a collections archives room was added to the building.

The Rangiora and Districts Early Records Society, which operates the museum, was formed in 1960. Since its formation, the society has benefited from donations of some 5,000 objects and more than 11,000 photographs, and glass slides. The museum has become a repository for family histories, documents and photographs relating to those who settled in the area. These irreplaceable archives are of great value to those who are researching the history of Rangiora families.

The objectives of the Rangiora and Districts Early Records Society are to collect, study, preserve and display records, photographs and other material relating to the history of Rangiora and the surrounding district, to foster a knowledge of the history of Rangiora and the surrounding district among the Society's members and the general public and to provide and operate a museum pertaining to that history.

The society hosts monthly meetings at the Rangiora Museum, where there are talks by members and visiting speakers on various topics of local historical and community interest.

A second museum, the Northbrook Museum, is located to the east of the town, adjacent to the Northbrook Chapel. This museum is a private undertaking, and is open by request with entry by donation. The collection is housed in four buildings, with the third building housing a collection of historic shop interiors from 'heritage' Rangiora include a blacksmiths and the fourth housing a large collection of tractors. The museum grounds are also home to the former Rangiora Post Office clock tower, which was originally part of Rangiora's first post office, which was demolished in 1936 to make way for the current building.

The Northbrook Museum has taken delivery of further historic artifacts which have been displaced by the Canterbury earthquakes. In February 2013, the museum took delivery of the former 'Canterbury Draught' sign that had been located on top of the DB Breweries building in Christchurch. Plans have also been noted for a historic township to be constructed as part of the museum's expansion.

The Herons' Steam Museum is located to the west of the town, past the Rangiora Racecourse. Although not listed as open to the public, the museum contains (or contained) a collection of industrial displays, working models and steam machinery including several traction engines, which have been restored at the museum and made regular gala appearances in the past. This museum has been owned by the Heron family since its inception in the 1970s, and entrance is by donation.

== Transport ==
Rangiora is linked by Metro Route 1 which links Kaiapoi, Christchurch and Princess Margaret Hospital via Main North Road and Flaxton Road.

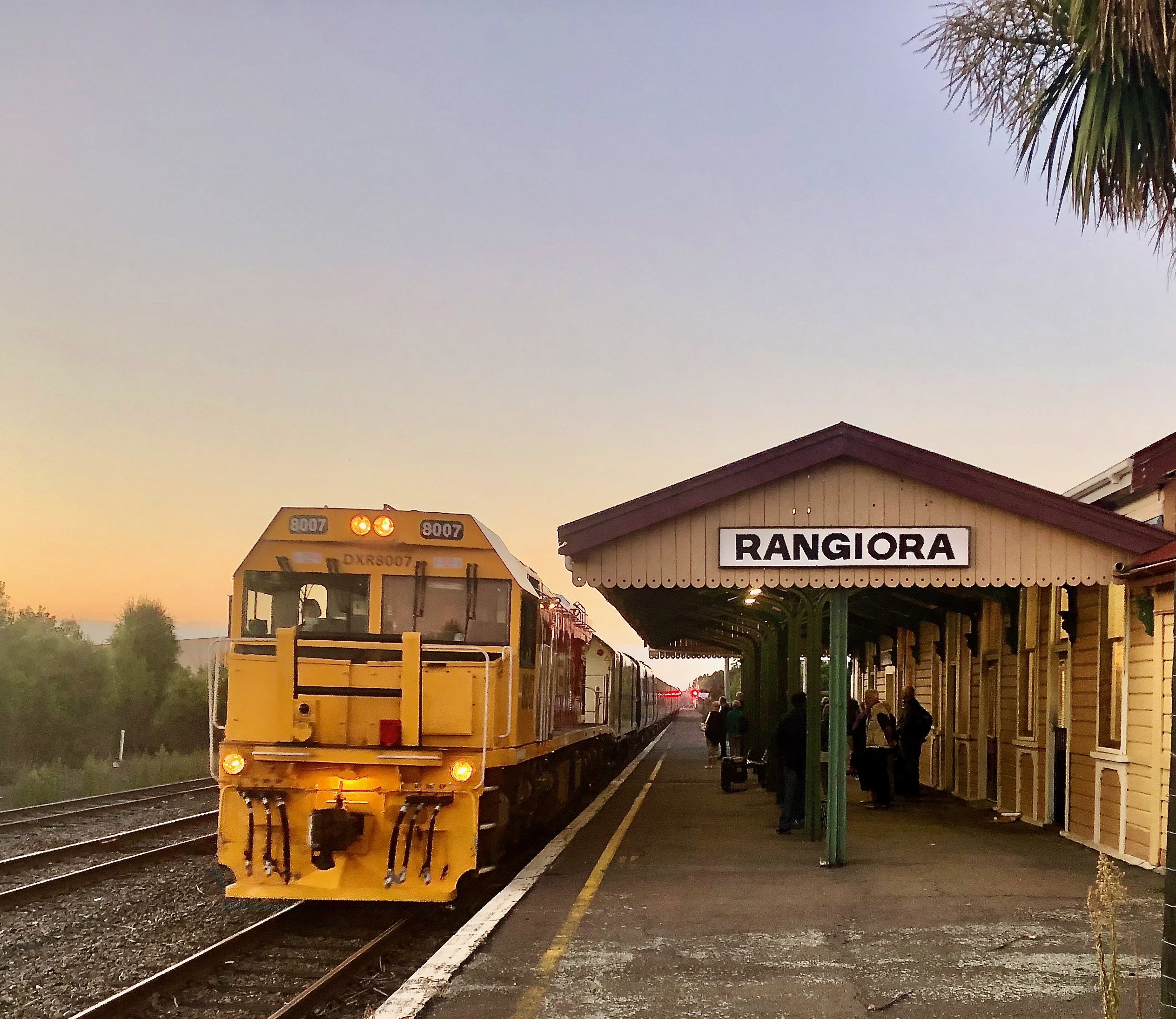
A DXR Class locomotive heading the northbound Coastal Pacific in 2021

=== Rail ===
The Main North Line reached Rangiora as part of the Canterbury Provincial Railways' 5' 3" gauge (1600mm) network that would eventually stretch north to Amberley. Southbrook was reached in July 1872, the extension to Rangiora being delayed by lack of chairs, until 5 November 1872. Rangiora was the terminus until the line was extended over the Ashley River bridge to Balcairn on 3 November 1875

A memorandum between the Resident Minister and the Superintendent of Canterbury specified that Rangiora and Kaiapoi should have station buildings of 50 by 16 ft (15.2 by 4.9 m), with 7 ft (2.1 m) verandas and including a booking office, ladies room, waiting room and luggage room, with 100 ft (30 m) platforms, urinals, closets, artesian wells and 90 by 30 ft (27.4 by 9.1 m) goods sheds.

In 1875, a collision occurred between two trains at the Rangiora Station; although there were no fatalities, both engines were damaged as was some of the rolling stock involved.

In 1878, the railway was converted to the narrow gauge 3 ft 6 in (1,070 mm) chosen by Sir Julius Vogel for the New Zealand Railways.

From 1878 until 1959, Rangiora was also the junction for the Oxford Branch, which ran from Rangiora to Oxford West station. A photo taken in about 1900 shows a station building located between the main line and the branch, at right angles to the current station. The branch was constructed to tap the timber and agricultural resources of the Oxford area, connected with the Eyreton Branch at Bennetts Junction and at Oxford West for the short Malvern Branch (as it was then known), which connected the Oxford Branch to Sheffield on the Midland Line. This line, known for its high road-rail bridge across the Waimakariri Gorge, was closed in 1931 after years of spasmodic use. The Eyreton Branch connection at Bennetts was also closed in 1931.

The Oxford Branch itself closed in 1959, although the formation, several goods sheds (at Fernside and Springbank) and the former East Oxford Station (demolished in 1999) were left as reminders of the old railway. The original line ran down past the Plough Hotel on High Street; while there are no signs of this, the railway later ran down Blackett Street and so the street is noticeably wider than most streets as it had to accommodate both the railway and the street.

In 2002, the Waimakariri District Council re-erected station nameboards along the line as memorials to the railway, including one at Bells, on the intersection of High Street and the Rangiora-Oxford Road. It was also noted in 2006 that the former Bennetts railway station had been acquired from its use as the Cust cricket pavilion for restoration at Oxford.

Suburban trains ran between Christchurch and Rangiora between 1878 and 30 April 1976, when declining patronage caused New Zealand Railways to discontinue the service. The station has since been converted at various times into a garden centre, and more latterly, The Station Cafè. The building today comprises the former stationmaster's office, waiting rooms, and lobby; originally built in an L-shape, the station has lost the extension which formerly held the women's and men's toilets, and other offices. The railway yard has also been reduced in size with the closure of the Oxford Branch. The yard presently comprises the mainline and two loops, one of which is disused following a derailment which damaged the points at the northern end of the second loop.

In 1945, the Main North Line railway from Christchurch to Picton was completed, passing through Rangiora. Since 1945, passenger services have connected Rangiora with Christchurch and Picton; initially, this service was provided by Vulcan railcars up until 1978, when they were replaced by locomotive-hauled trains. The TranzCoastal, rebranded as the Coastal Pacific in 2011, passes through Rangiora heading north in the morning and south again in the afternoon. This has recently been cut back to three trains each way per week in the off-peak season, following a similar format applied to the Overlander between Auckland and Wellington in 2006.

== Education ==
The town has several primary schools and two secondary schools. They are:

- Ashgrove School, a state full primary (Year 1–8) school in the north-west of the town with a roll of 424 students (as of July 2026). The school opened in 1967.
- Rangiora Borough School, a state full primary (Year 1–8) school in the centre of the town with a roll of 314 students (as of July 2026). The school opened in 1873.
- St Joseph's School, a state-integrated Catholic full primary (Year 1–8) school in the centre of the town with a roll of 177 students (as of July 2026). The school opened in 1887 as a private school and integrated into the state education system in the early 1980s.
- Te Matauru Primary, a state full primary (Year 1–8) school in the south-west of the town with a roll of 240 students (as of July 2026). The school opened in 2020.
- Rangiora High School, a state co-educational secondary school, which serves Rangiora and the surrounding area, with a roll of 1,680 students (as of July 2026). The school opened in 1884.
- Rangiora New Life School, a state-integrated Christian area school (year 1–13) situated in the Rangiora suburb of Southbrook. The school opened in 1979 as a private school and integrated into the state education system in the early 1990s. It has a roll of 467 students (as of July 2026).

Population growth in the Rangiora area since the mid-2000s, especially following the 2011 Christchurch earthquake, saw the town's primary schools start to approach capacity. In response to this, Te Matauru Primary opened in January 2020.
