= Killing of Juan Jumalon =

Filipino journalist and radio broadcaster (1966–2023)

- Juan "Johnny Walker" Jumalon doing his live broadcast just seconds before he is gunned down
- Location: 8°33′22″N 123°38′17″E; Calamba, Misamis Occidental
- Date: November 5, 2023; 5:22 a.m. (Note: Most news sources reported it between 5:30 to 5:35 a.m. A CCTV camera of a radio booth captured the killing at the timestamp of 5:22 a.m.) (UTC+8)
- Attack type: Shooting
- Weapon: .45 caliber pistol
- Deaths: 1
- Victim: Juan Jumalon
- Assailant: Unknown
- No. of participants: 3

Juan Tumpag "Johnny Walker" Jumalon (August 2, 1966 – November 5, 2023) was a Filipino radio broadcaster for 94.7 Gold Mega Calamba FM who was killed on live broadcast by an unidentified gunman at his home in Calamba, Misamis Occidental.

== Background ==
Juan "Johnny Walker" Jumalon was the second journalist to be killed in Mindanao while on-air since 1985, the fourth journalist to be killed under the Bongbong Marcos administration since he took office in June 2022, and the 199th overall since 1986. Before his death, Jumalon regularly broadcast his radio station 94.7 Gold Mega Calamba FM through his Facebook streaming, which has around 2,400 followers. His program is known for spreading good vibes and also cracked jokes on air, rather than focusing on news and commentary. According to the Committee to Protect Journalists, the Philippines ranked eighth for the world's most dangerous places for journalists as of 2023.

== Killing ==
On November 5, 2023, at his home in Brgy. Don Bernardo A. Neri in Calamba, Misamis Occidental, Juan Jumalon, also known on air as "Johnny Walker", broadcast his radio station 94.7 Gold Mega Calamba FM via Facebook livestream. At around 5:22 a.m. (UTC+8), two men wearing their caps showed up outside the gate of the house on a pretense to have a public announcement regarding the gunman's lost belongings. After the staff agreed, one of them drew his gun and aimed at the staffer while the other proceeded to enter the radio booth, where he shot the broadcaster twice, hitting his lower lip and the back portion of his head. He was 57. The gunman stole the necklace before quickly fleeing with a third accomplice in a motorcycle, who acted as a lookout. The killing was caught on both Facebook livestream and CCTV camera; the former showing blood oozing from Jumalon's mouth after he was shot while the lively instrumental music plays. The original live broadcast of Jumalon's broadcast had been deleted but not before the netizens were able to record it.

Jumalon was rushed to the hospital by the family members but was pronounced dead on arrival. The family stated that they have not received any threats against Jumalon. Jumalon's widow Jerrebel Jumalon believed that the motive of her husband's killing was personal grudge as the slain broadcaster focused only on entertainment on his radio program. Mrs. Jumalon said that before her husband was killed, he won a case in court related to a dispute over the land where their radio station is located.

== Investigation ==
The police are yet to identify at least three suspects in the killing, including the two gunmen and a getaway driver. They are investigating whether it was work or personal-related. On November 6, the police released the composite sketch of one of the suspects in killing the broadcaster. Misamis Occidental police director Colonel Dwight Monato said that Jumalon had a heated argument regarding the land dispute with two people two days before his death. They also added that the gunman used a .45 pistol in the crime. On November 8, the police said that they determined the name of one of the suspects but did not disclose as the investigation is ongoing. The three suspects were charged with murder and theft.

== Reactions ==
President Bongbong Marcos condemned the killing of Jumalon and ordered the national police to track the perpetrator. Marcos Jr. added that "attacks on journalists will not be tolerated in our democracy." The National Union of Journalists of the Philippines (NUJP) and the Mindanao Independent Press Council Inc. (MIPC) called the killing "brazen" and "barbaric". The Presidential Communications Office (PCO) expressed condolences to Jumalon's family, and condemned the attack on the journalists. Senators Bong Revilla and Robin Padilla called the law enforcement for the swift investigation while House Speaker Martin Romualdez was "deeply saddened" over the killing.

The Human Rights Watch urged Marcos to put in place measures to prevent further deaths of journalists.

== See also ==
- Killing of Percy Lapid, which occurred one year and a month prior
