= Liberation Institute =

Christian school in Misamis Occidental, Philippines

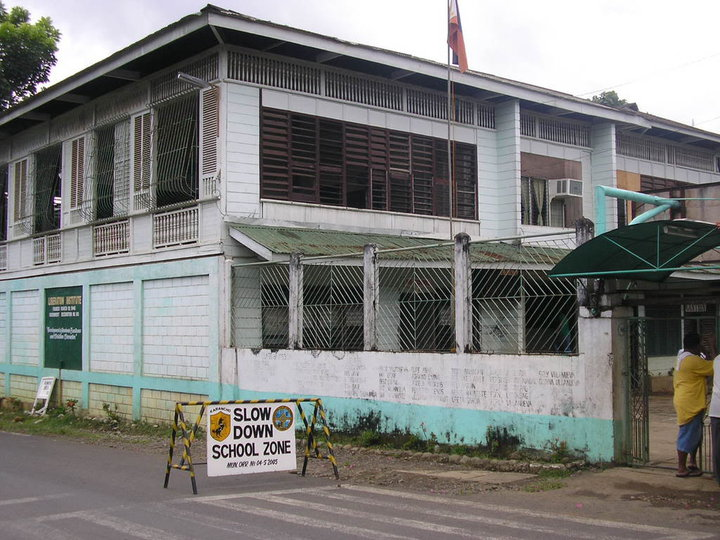
- Front View of the Liberation Institute

Location
- Calamba, Misamis Occidental; Philippines
- Coordinates: 8°33′31″N 123°38′47″E

Information
- Type: Private, Christian
- Motto: "God, Humanity, Country"
- Established: 1946
- Color
- Song: Liberation Institute Hymn

The Liberation Institute is a Christian academic institution located in Calamba, Misamis Occidental, Philippines. The institute currently caters Pre-Elementary, Grade School, and High School students.

== History ==
The school was founded on March 18, 1946 by members of the United Church of Christ in the Philippines. The school was named as such because the founding was briefly before the Philippines became an independent nation (July 4, 1946), hence the name "Liberation." It was recognized by the Philippine government as an institution of higher education in the same year that it was founded, with Recognition No. 165.

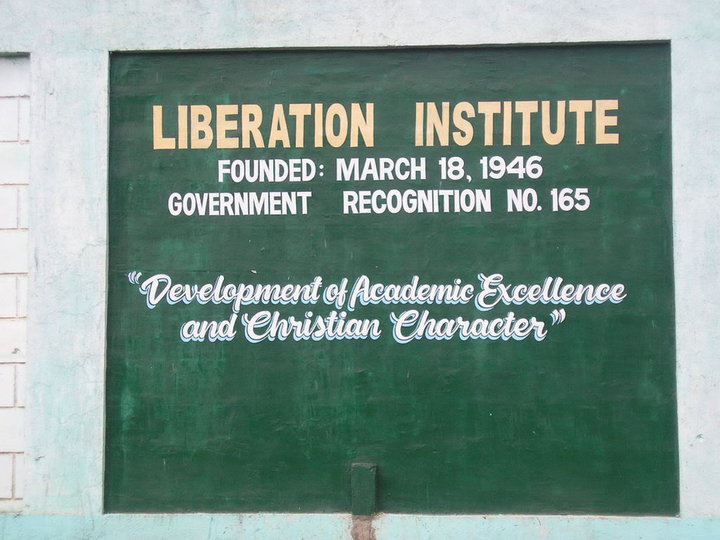
Liberation Institute marker

== Liberation Christian School ==
In 1996, the school celebrated its golden anniversary and in the following year, its name was changed to Liberation Christian School. However, due to public clamor for the retention of the old name, the administration decided to restore the former name.

== Notable alumni ==
- Ricardo T. Gloria - DOST Secretary (1992–1994), and Department of Education, Culture, and Sports (DECS) Secretary (1994–1997).
- Dr. Ben S. Malayang III - Silliman University President (2006–2018)

== See also ==
- Calamba, Misamis Occidental
