= 1932 in radio =

The year 1932 saw a number of significant happenings in radio broadcasting history.

== Events ==
- 8 January – Pittsburgh radio activist and catholic priest, Father Cox, and his army of unemployed men return home after a protest march on Depression era Washington, D.C.
- 15 February – Clara, Lu & Em, generally regarded as the first daytime network soap opera, debuts in its morning time slot over the Blue Network of NBC Radio in the United States, having originally been a late evening program.
- 1 March – Both NBC and CBS go to Hopewell, New Jersey to provide live coverage of the Lindbergh kidnapping.
- 7 March – First transmission of Finnish Yleisradio's daily Morning Devotions programme.
- 24 March – A radio variety show is broadcast from a moving train for the first time, when Belle Baker hosts a show on a train traveling around the New York area. It is broadcast on the New York City station WABC. She talks first about the weather then, about local news regarding home-towns or stations of the train with the radio.
- 14 May – The BBC broadcasts its last programmes from the Savoy Hill studios in London.
- 15 May – The BBC moves into its new headquarters, Broadcasting House in London.
- 26 May – The Canadian Radio Broadcasting Act is passed, providing for the establishment of the Canadian Radio Broadcasting Commission.
- 1 July – Following nationalization of the Australian Broadcasting Company, the Australian prime minister, Joseph Lyons, officially inaugurates transmissions from the twelve stations of the Australian Broadcasting Commission, forerunner of today's Australian Broadcasting Corporation.
- 29 September – Radio PTT Nord broadcasts from a balloon flying at a height of 2,300 metres above Lille, France.
- 20 October – CBS Radio returns WJSV (modern-day WFED) in Alexandria, Virginia to the air, after a three-month period of silence. CBS has purchased the station from namesake James S. Vance, citing the heavy connections existing behind the scenes with Vance and the Ku Klux Klan. It has operated and programmed WJSV since 1929, unintentionally making CBS a proxy with the Klan. In addition, WJSV is also moved from Mount Vernon, Virginia to the aforementioned Washington, D.C. suburb.
- 26 November – The Macy's Thanksgiving Day Parade begins broadcasting on local radio stations.
- 30 November – The BBC begins a series of radio broadcasts to mark the 75th birthday of Sir Edward Elgar.
- 19 December – The BBC Empire Service (ancestor of the BBC World Service) begins international broadcasting from a shortwave facility at its Daventry transmitting station in England.
- 25 December – The first Royal Christmas Message is broadcast on the BBC Empire Service by King George V from Sandringham House; the text has been written by Rudyard Kipling.
- (undated) – the founder of WJBO AM, Valdmeer Jensen sells the station to the Manship family.

== Debuts ==
- 4 January – The Carnation Contented Hour debuts on the NBC Red Network in the United States.
- 4 January – WEEU, Reading, Pennsylvania, begins broadcasting on 830 kHz with 1 KW power (daytime only).
- 12 January – The Ed Sullivan Show debuts on CBS in the United States.
- 15 February – George Burns and Gracie Allen become regulars on The Guy Lombardo Show on CBS.
- 29 March – Jack Benny is heard on the radio for the first time on Ed Sullivan's show.
- 26 April --The Fire Chief debuts on NBC.
- 2 May – The Jack Benny Program debuts on the NBC Blue Network in the United States.
- 29 June – The comedy serial Vic and Sade debuts on NBC Blue Network.
- 12 September – Tarzan of the Apes debuts on WOR and in syndication.
- 5 October – The Adventures of Captain Diamond debuts on NBC Blue Network.
- 10 October – Chandu the Magician debuts on KHJ, Los Angeles.
- 10 October – Betty and Bob debuts on the NBC Blue Network.
- 23 October – Fred Allen's first radio program, the Linit Bath Club Revue, debuts on CBS.
- 30 October – Bring 'Em Back Alive debuts on NBC.
- 6 November – Manhattan Merry-Go-Round debuts on NBC.
- 7 November – Buck Rogers in the 25th Century debuts on CBS.
- 8 November – Presenting Al Jolson debuts on NBC.
- 24 November – The Macy's Thanksgiving Day Parade starts broadcasting on local radio stations.
- 28 November – Situation comedy Flywheel, Shyster, and Flywheel (originally Beagle, Shyster, and Beagle), starring Groucho and Chico Marx, debuts on the NBC Blue Network.
- 2 December – Charlie Chan debuts on the NBC Blue Network.

== Closings ==
- 30 April – Alice Joy, the Dream Singer ends its run on network radio (NBC).
- 25 May – Coca-Cola Topnotchers ends its run on network radio (NBC-Red).
- 28 May – The Camel Quarter-Hour ends its run on network radio (CBS).
- 18 August – The Ed Sullivan Show ends its run on CBS.
- (undated) – Harold Teen ends its run on WGN, Chicago, Illinois.

== Births ==
- 19 January – George MacBeth, Scottish-born poet and radio poetry producer (died 1992).
- 27 April – Casey Kasem, American radio personality, best known as host of the nationally syndicated countdown show American Top 40 (died 2014).
- 13 May – Gianni Boncompagni, Italian broadcast presenter (died 2017).
- 16 August – Pervis Spann, American disc jockey (died 2022).
- 13 September – Dick Biondi, American National Radio Hall of Fame and Rock and Roll Hall of Fame Top 40 and Oldies disc jockey.
- 9 December – Morton Downey, Jr., controversial and influential American broadcast talk show host of the 1980s, pioneer of the "trash talk show" format (died 2001).
