= Compass FM 104.9 =

North Canterbury; New Zealand
- Frequencies: 104.9 and 103.7 MHz

History
- First air date: June 2011

Technical information
- Transmitter coordinates: 43.1219°S 172.5488°E

Links
- Website: Compass FM Website

Compass FM is a not-for-profit community radio station in the North Canterbury region of New Zealand. Although a community radio station, it receives no funding from New Zealand On Air, and is thus not a member of the group of "access" stations represented by the Association of Community Access Broadcasters. The station is entirely funded by advertising, and from sponsorship, most notably from lines company MainPower.

From a transmitter atop Mount Grey, the station can be heard over much of North Canterbury, covering the Waimakariri District, much of the Hurunui District and Selwyn District, and in greater Christchurch. Compass FM also have two repeaters transmitting on 103.7 MHz covering Hanmer Springs, as well as Cheviot, along State Highway 1, through to Kaikōura, as well as from Waikari heading through to the Lewis Pass.

== Studios ==
The Compass FM studio is located in Rangiora.
