= Southbrook, New Zealand =

Suburb of Rangiora, New Zealand

Southbrook
- Interactive map of Southbrook
- Coordinates: 43.33°S 172.60°E
- Country: New Zealand
- Region: Canterbury
- Territorial authority: Waimakariri District
- Ward: Rangiora-Ashley Ward
- Community: Rangiora-Ashley Community
- Electorates: Waimakariri; Te Tai Tonga (Māori)

Government
  - Territorial Authority: Waimakariri District Council
  - Regional council: Environment Canterbury
  - Mayor of Waimakariri: Dan Gordon
  - Waimakariri MP: Matt Doocey
  - Te Tai Tonga MP: Tākuta Ferris

Area
  - Total: 3.24 km^{2} (1.25 sq mi)

Population (June 2025)
  - Total: 850
  - Density: 260/km^{2} (680/sq mi)

Southbrook is a suburb of Rangiora, in North Canterbury, New Zealand. It is located at the south end of the town. The population in the 2013 Census was 801. As the term "town" has no official meaning in New Zealand, Southbrook is sometimes considered as a separate town.

== Demographics ==
Southbrook covers 3.24 km^{2} (1.25 sq mi). It had an estimated population of 850 as of June 2025, with a population density of 262 people per km^{2}.

Historical population
Year	Pop.	±% p.a.
2006	738	—
2013	825	+1.60%
2018	798	−0.66%
2023	816	+0.45%
The 2006 population is for a smaller area of 2.31 km^{2}. Source:

Southbrook had a population of 816 in the 2023 New Zealand census, an increase of 18 people (2.3%) since the 2018 census, and a decrease of 9 people (−1.1%) since the 2013 census. There were 390 males and 423 females in 291 dwellings. 2.6% of people identified as LGBTIQ+. The median age was 36.2 years (compared with 38.1 years nationally). There were 165 people (20.2%) aged under 15 years, 168 (20.6%) aged 15 to 29, 321 (39.3%) aged 30 to 64, and 159 (19.5%) aged 65 or older.

People could identify as more than one ethnicity. The results were 94.1% European (Pākehā); 11.0% Māori; 2.6% Pasifika; 4.8% Asian; 0.4% Middle Eastern, Latin American and African New Zealanders (MELAA); and 1.5% other, which includes people giving their ethnicity as "New Zealander". English was spoken by 97.8%, Māori by 3.3%, Samoan by 0.4%, and other languages by 8.5%. No language could be spoken by 2.2% (e.g. too young to talk). New Zealand Sign Language was known by 0.7%. The percentage of people born overseas was 19.1, compared with 28.8% nationally.

Religious affiliations were 32.0% Christian, 1.1% Hindu, 0.4% Islam, 0.7% Māori religious beliefs, 0.4% Buddhist, 0.7% New Age, and 0.7% other religions. People who answered that they had no religion were 55.9%, and 8.1% of people did not answer the census question.

Of those at least 15 years old, 72 (11.1%) people had a bachelor's or higher degree, 420 (64.5%) had a post-high school certificate or diploma, and 159 (24.4%) people exclusively held high school qualifications. The median income was $38,900, compared with $41,500 nationally. 42 people (6.5%) earned over $100,000 compared to 12.1% nationally. The employment status of those at least 15 was 330 (50.7%) full-time, 105 (16.1%) part-time, and 21 (3.2%) unemployed.

== Education ==
Southbrook has one primary school and one state-integrated composite school.

- Southbrook School is a state co-educational full primary school with a roll of 253 students (as of July 2026). The school opened in 1874.
- Rangiora New Life School is a state-integrated co-educational composite school with a roll of 467 students (as of July 2026). It opened as a primary school in 1979. It became state-integrated and added secondary schooling in 1994.
