= Rangiora New Life School =

Location
- Denchs Road; Rangiora; New Zealand; 43.319738°S 172.600216°E

Information
- Type: State Integrated Composite (Years 1-13)
- Motto: Seek, serve, soar.
- Established: 1979
- Ministry of Education Institution no.: 418
- Principal: Stephen Walters
- Enrolment: 467 (July 2026)
- Hours in school day: 8:50 am–3:10 pm
- Socio-economic decile: 9
- Intranet: New Life Connect connect.rnls.school.nz
- Apps platform: SharePoint & Office365
- Website: www.rnls.school.nz

Rangiora New Life School is a state-integrated Christian area School situated in Southbrook, Rangiora, New Zealand. It was established in 1979 as a private school and integrated into the state education system in March 1994. The school has a roll of 467 students from years 1 to 13 (approx. ages 5 to 18) as of July 2026, many of whom are not of religious conviction (the school having a policy of acceptance towards personal religion). The current principal is Stephen Walters.

It is notable for its high success rate of students passing their respective NCEA qualifications. In 2010, all Year 11 students at the school passed their NCEA Level 1 standards, the highest pass rate in New Zealand.

== Staff ==
Rangiora New Life has 59 staff, including management, teaching, support, administration and property staff as of 1 October 2019.
