= 1931 in radio =

The year 1931 saw a number of significant events in radio broadcasting history.

== Events ==
- 8 January – In Hamburg, Germany, Nordische Rundfunk AG (NORAG) moves to new purpose-built headquarters at Rothenbaumchaussee 132.
- 22 January – Haus des Rundfunks in Berlin inaugurated as headquarters of German national broadcaster Reichs-Rundfunk-Gesellschaft.
- 1 February – In Belgium the Institut National de Radiodiffusion / Nationaal Instituut voor de Radio-omroep (INR/NIR) begins broadcasting.
- 21 March – In Switzerland the Société suisse de radiodiffusion (SSR) is founded, bringing together the five regional radio stations already in existence (in Basel, Bern, Geneva, Lausanne, and Zürich) under the supervision of the Federal Department of Posts and Railways.
- 23 April – Inauguration of the Swiss national medium-wave transmitter at Sottens by the French-language Société Romande de Radiophonie (SRR) and Radio-Genève.
- 30 April – In France the Poste Colonial (also known as "Radio Coloniale") begins broadcasting to the French colonies from a shortwave transmitter at Pontoise.
- 1 May – The Los Angeles Police Department's KGPL begins broadcasting.
- 11 May – The Pittsburgh Police begin broadcasting with "radio patrol cars" and the region's first emergency band.
- 24 May – Polskie Radio begins transmitting its national programme from a new long-wave station at Raszyn, outside Warsaw. With a power of 158 kW, it is the most powerful transmitter in Europe at this time.
- 11 June – Inauguration of the Swiss national medium-wave transmitter at Beromünster by the German-language Schweizer Radio DRS.
- 24–30 July – Jehovah's Witnesses make the most extensive radio chain broadcast ever to air up to 1931. The broadcast is of a portion of the group's convention held in Columbus, Ohio, USA. The broadcast is carried by more than 450 radio stations in Australia, Canada, Europe, and the United States.
- 18 October – NBC replaces its NBC-Pacific nine-station network with two five-station networks, known informally as the Orange and Gold networks. Orange comprises KGO, Oakland; KFI, Los Angeles; KGW, Portland, KOMO, Seattle, and KHQ, Spokane. Gold comprises KPO, San Francisco; KECA, Los Angeles; KEX, Portland; KJR, Seattle; and KGA, Spokane.
- 10 October – William Randolph Hearst buys WGBS, which is later named WINS after Hearst's International News Service.
- 1 November – NBC acquires a half-interest in WMAQ, Chicago, Illinois, from the Chicago Daily News.
- November – KGKF, Little Rock, Arkansas, changes its call letters to KARK.
- Undated – Ente Italiano per le Audizioni Radiofoniche (EIAR) founds its first orchestra, in Turin, earliest constituent of the RAI National Symphony Orchestra.

== Debuts ==
- 4 January – The Fred Waring Show debuts on NBC.
- 27 January – Clara, Lu, and Em, the first daytime radio serial, debuts on the NBC Blue Network as a late-evening program. On 15 February 1932, the show moves to its morning time slot.
- 26 April – The Carnation Contented Hour debuts on NBC West Coast.
- 21 May – The Witch's Tale debuts on WOR (AM).
- 1 June – The Camel Quarter-Hour debuts on CBS.
- 2 September – Bing Crosby makes his solo debut on network radio and remains on air with at least one weekly show until the fall of 1962.
- 11 October – The American Album of Familiar Music debuts on NBC.
- 16 October – The Boswell Sisters program debuts on CBS.
- 26 October – Alice Joy, the Dream Singer debuts on NBC.
- 3 November – WJMS, Ironwood, Michigan, begins broadcasting.
- 25 December – The Metropolitan Opera begins broadcasting its regular Saturday afternoon performances on the NBC Blue Network.
- (undated) – Harold Teen debuts on WGN, Chicago, Illinois.

== Endings ==
- 22 June – Empire Builders ends its run on network radio NBC-Blue.
- 30 October – The Federal Radio Commission orders WCHI and WJAZ – two stations in the Chicago, Illinois, area – off the air in order to allow full-time operation for WCKY, Covington, Kentucky.
- 18 December – The Federal Radio Commission orders WOQ, Kansas City, Missouri, and WMAK, Buffalo, New York, off the air: WOQ "to make way for KFH, Wichita, Kansas" and WMAK "because of an unsatisfactory showing of public interest", as reported in Broadcasting.

== Births ==
- 6 January – Dick Bertel, announcer, news anchor, and media executive at WTIC (AM), NBC Radio Network, and the Voice of America - host of The Golden Age of Radio from 1970 - 1977, an oral history of network radio entertainment programming
- 30 January – Conrad Binyon, American actor, played the mayor's ward, Butch, in Mayor of the Town.
- 11 June – Brad Pye Jr., African American sports journalist (died 2020).
- 18 August – Bernard "Buddy" Diliberto, sports commentator in New Orleans for over 50 years (died 2005).
- 2 September – Michael Dante, American radio talk show host, actor, stage and screen director, previously a professional athlete.
- Patricia Greene, English actress.
- Edward Taylor, English scriptwriter and producer.
