= XHCORO-FM =

Radio station in Loma Bonita, Oaxaca, Mexico

Defunct
- Loma Bonita, Oaxaca, Mexico; Mexico
- Frequency: 98.7 MHz
- Branding: La Ke Buena

Programming
- Format: Grupera
- Affiliations: Radiópolis

Ownership
- Owner: López Lena Cruz family; (Complejo Satelital, S.A. de C.V.)

History
- First air date: April 4, 1979
- Last air date: May 20, 2023
- Former call signs: XEQF-AM (1979–1996); XECORO-AM (1996–2011)
- Call sign meaning: "Corporación Radiofónica Oaxaqueña"

Technical information
- ERP: 25 kW
- Transmitter coordinates: 18°05′25″N 95°54′40″W

XHCORO-FM was a radio station on 98.7 FM in Loma Bonita, Oaxaca, Mexico, serving Tuxtepec. XHCORO was owned by the López Lena family and last carried the Ke Buena grupera format from Radiópolis.

== History ==
XHCORO began as XEQF-AM 1470, awarded in 1979 to Radio Loma, S.A. On June 20, 1996, XEQF became XECORO-AM, around the time the station moved to 750 kHz.

In 2011, XECORO moved to FM as XHCORO-FM 98.7. The station left the air for good on May 20, 2023, and surrendered its concession to the Federal Telecommunications Institute, citing economic reasons.
