= Port FM =

- New Zealand
- Broadcast area: South Canterbury, New Zealand

Programming
- Format: Adult contemporary

History
- First air date: 1995-2018

Technical information
- Class: Terrestrial/Internet
- Transmitter coordinates: 44.4004°S 171.0571°E

Links
- Website: www.portfm.co.nz (redirects to More FM)

Port FM was a local radio station based in Timaru, New Zealand that broadcast throughout South Canterbury and the MacKenzie Country. It also operated as a network with sister stations in Ashburton and Oamaru known as 'Port FM Local'. Port FM's music genre was contemporary rock and pop, with the bulk of the weekday playlist made up of music from the mid eighties through the early nineties. The main (Timaru-based) station was used as a network feed for Port FM Local in Ashburton and Oamaru during breakfast, nights and weekends.

Port FM ceased trading as an independent radio station on 30 April 2018, and is now under the MediaWorks branch of stations. The Port FM frequency is now broadcasting a South Canterbury version of More FM, with local content between 10am and 3pm weekdays.

The Port FM network was based in Timaru and was heard throughout South Canterbury and the MacKenzie Country. In 2006, two other stations owned by Port FM in Ashburton and Oamaru were renamed Port FM Regional. They were originally known as Fox FM (Ashburton) and Whitestone 100FM (Oamaru), broadcasting locally during the day and at nights relaying the Port FM feed programme from Timaru. The network used a tagline of 'Live, Local and Loving It'.

== Sale to MediaWorks ==
Port FM was privately owned by businessman and radio entrepreneur Brent Birchfield since 1995. The network operated in Ashburton, Timaru, Oamaru and in Greymouth on the West Coast from 2007 onwards. From the early 2000s Port FM had close ties with MediaWorks: sourcing their news bulletins from Newshub and providing advertising sales and services to other MediaWorks stations in the region (The Edge, The Rock, The Sound and Magic). These stations were operated locally by Port FM under a franchise arrangement with MediaWorks. In January 2018 the sale of Port FM to MediaWorks was announced, with a takeover date of 1 April 2018. In April 2018 an announcement was made that Port FM would be rebranded as More FM on 28 April 2018 and The Breeze would also begin broadcasting in South Canterbury with Port FM breakfast announcer OJ Jackson moving to The Breeze to present local breakfast. More FM would be reduced to local content for a few hours during the weekends and 10am to 3pm weekdays. Six Port FM staff were made redundant within eight months of MediaWorks purchasing Port FM.

The West Coast operation was sold to NZME, who used the frequencies to bring Mix (later replaced by Gold and then iHeartCountry) and Radio Hauraki to the Coast.

== Programmes ==
The final station lineup consisted of The Region's Big Breakfast With OJ Jackson. This was followed by a daytime show with Eve O'Brien, and drive show with James Valentine. The night line-up included a three-hour rock music segment from 9-midnight. Saturday programming included a sports breakfast show, the syndicated United States show Retro Pop Reunion with Joe Cortez, and the Automated Party Mix. The Sunday line-up included a Breakfast/daytime show with James Valentine. Molly Callanan was also part of the on air announcer line up.

On Sunday afternoons it broadcast the Rick Dees Weekly Top 40, an internationally syndicated US radio program created and hosted by American radio personality Rick Dees. The countdown show is designed for Hot AC stations and is distributed by Radio Express. The countdown used to reach most parts of the country through More FM and independent radio networks.

== Stations ==
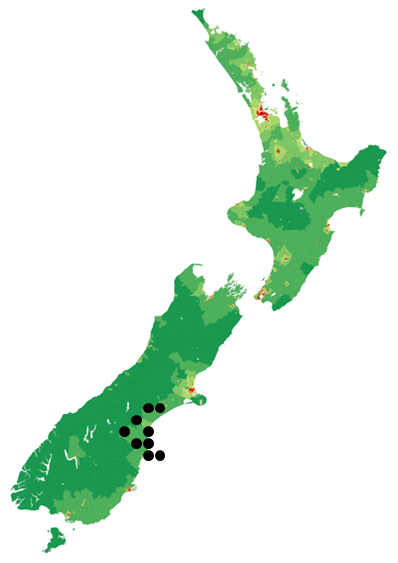
This maps shows the distribution of Port FM frequencies.

=== Port FM Timaru ===
Port FM Timaru broadcast until April 2018 in South Canterbury on 97.9 FM, in Timaru on 93.1 FM, in Waimate on 93.1 FM, in Fairlie on 95.0 FM, and in Twizel on 89.4 FM and 94.2 FM. It was also available in Omarama on 90.9 FM, and in Otematata on 98.1 FM.

=== Port FM Ashburton ===
Port FM Ashburton broadcast until April 2018 in Ashburton on 94.9 FM, and 98.9 FM. It began as Fox FM in 1995, and claimed to broadcast from "the hills to the sea", from "Bridge to Bridge and Beyond" and from Rakaia to Rangitata and beyond. In mid-2006 it was rebranded as 'Mid Canterbury's Port FM Local'. In mid-2010, the station regained its local breakfast show, which was first hosted by Dave Nicholas then by Bex Carr. The local show was dropped at the end of 2013 and then networked direct from the Timaru station.

=== Port FM Oamaru ===
Whitestone 100 FM was Port FM's local radio station in Oamaru broadcasting on 100FM and 96FM. It began broadcasting in 1993. In 2002 the station ended with 100FM relaunched as Waitaki's Solid Gold 100 FM, broadcasting a local breakfast and the Solid Gold network during the day, while 96FM broadcast The Edge network. 100FM was later relaunched as 'Waitaki's Port FM Local' carrying local and Port FM Timaru programming. In mid 2010 the local 10am-2pm show was removed to make way for a local North Otago breakfast show to return for the first time in almost 10 years. The local show in Oamaru and the Waitaki valley was hosted by Marc Cookson and later Anton Roswell. It was changed again in 2012 to make way for a Timaru regional show.

=== MediaWorks affiliates ===
Port FM operated affiliate stations for four radio networks owned by MediaWorks New Zealand.

The Edge, a youth-oriented hit music station, is broadcast in Ashburton on 93.3 FM, Timaru on 92.3 FM and 95.5 FM, Twizel on 99.8 FM, Omarama on 98.9 FM, Otematata on 90.1 FM and Oamaru on 96.0 FM.

The Sound is broadcast in Ashburton on 95.7 FM, Timaru on 90.7 FM and 97.1 FM, Oamaru on 99.2 FM, Kurow on 105.6 FM and Twizel and Fairlie on 104.6 FM.

The Rock is broadcast in Ashburton on 97.3 FM, Timaru on 91.5 FM, Oamaru on 104.8 FM.

Magic was broadcast in Ashburton on 103.7 FM, Timaru on 103.5 FM, Oamaru on 94.4 FM and Omarama and Otematata on 88.5 FM.
