= XHCSAG-FM =

Radio station in Mérida, Yucatán, Mexico

Mérida, Yucatán; Mexico
- Frequency: 101.9 MHz
- Branding: Vida Nueva

Ownership
- Owner: La Visión de Dios, A.C.

History
- First air date: March 15, 2023
- Call sign meaning: (templated call sign)

Technical information
- Class: A
- ERP: 2.77 kW
- HAAT: 82.5 m
- Transmitter coordinates: 21°0′34.6″N 89°32′15.2″W

Links
- Website: vidanuevaradiofm.com

XHCSAG-FM is a social radio station on 101.9 MHz in Mérida, Yucatán, Mexico. The station is owned by the civil association La Visión de Dios, A.C. (lit. 'The Vision of God' in Spanish) and began broadcasting in March 2023 under the name Vida Nueva (lit. 'New Life').

XHCSAG was one of the most contested concession awards in Mexican broadcasting history, in large part due to the name of the concessionaire, which fueled concerns about the use of the frequency for religious programming. Mexican law does not permit religious associations or registered pastors to hold broadcasting concessions.

== History ==
=== Award ===
The Federal Telecommunications Institute (IFT)'s annual frequency program for 2017 included a social Class A assignment for Mérida. In the application window, three parties filed: La Visión de Dios, A.C., on October 2; Arte y Cultura por Solidaridad, A.C., on October 11; and Radio Tonatiuh, A.C., on October 12. As the other two applicants already had one social station apiece (XHACS-FM in Playa del Carmen and the unbuilt XHCSAL-FM in Valladolid, Yucatán, respectively), the IFT approved the La Visión de Dios application.

On May 29, 2019, Rebeca Chan Cámara, legal representative for La Visión de Dios, received the official paperwork at the IFT's Mexico City offices. In a July interview with El Economista, her first with a national outlet, she explained that her plans to build a radio station stem from a plan to reduce drug addictions, which have affected people close to her; Yucatán leads the country in suicides. The station was planned to sign on before the end of 2019 at a total construction cost of approximately 4 million pesos.

=== Criticism ===
The name of the concessionaire, explicitly referencing God, made the La Visión de Dios award a lightning rod for criticism from media and legal analysts. Article 41 of the Ley de Asociaciones Religiosas y Culto Público contains an explicit prohibition on the ownership of mass media outlets by religious associations, with an exception for "printed publications of a religious nature". Florence Toussaint, Jorge Bravo, Gerardo Soria, and other analysts decried the award, as did organizations including the Mexican Association for the Right to Information (AMEDI). The IFT defended its actions in a statement, noting that its own research found that none of the members of La Visión de Dios were registered religious ministers and that it could not deny the application based on the name of the applicant.

The award came amidst lobbying of President Andrés Manuel López Obrador by religious leaders, particularly the head of the National Brotherhood of Christian Evangelical Churches (Confraternice), to change the Ley de Asociaciones Religiosas and remove the religious media ownership ban. These proposals had met with negative reaction from lawmakers in the Senate. Several social radio stations already carry religious programming, such as the stations owned by Fundación Cultural para la Sociedad Mexicana.

In June, a local reporter from Novedades Yucatán attempted to locate the legal residence listed on the concession, in the Chichí Suárez neighborhood of Mérida, and found that the street on which the civil association claimed to be located was nonexistent; however, Chan stated that the station's transmitter would be built on land she owns in that area. Officials in Yucatán said they did not have any record of the incorporation of La Visión de Dios in the state.

=== Sign-on ===
XHCSAG-FM began broadcasting on March 15, 2023, after delays attributable to the COVID-19 pandemic increasing wait times for the necessary aviation permits to build the tower. The station had to get on air; it had already been granted a 180-day extension to begin broadcasting, and it signed on just days before the extension lapsed.
