= Jellie Brouwer =

Dutch journalist, reporter and television presenter (1964–2023)

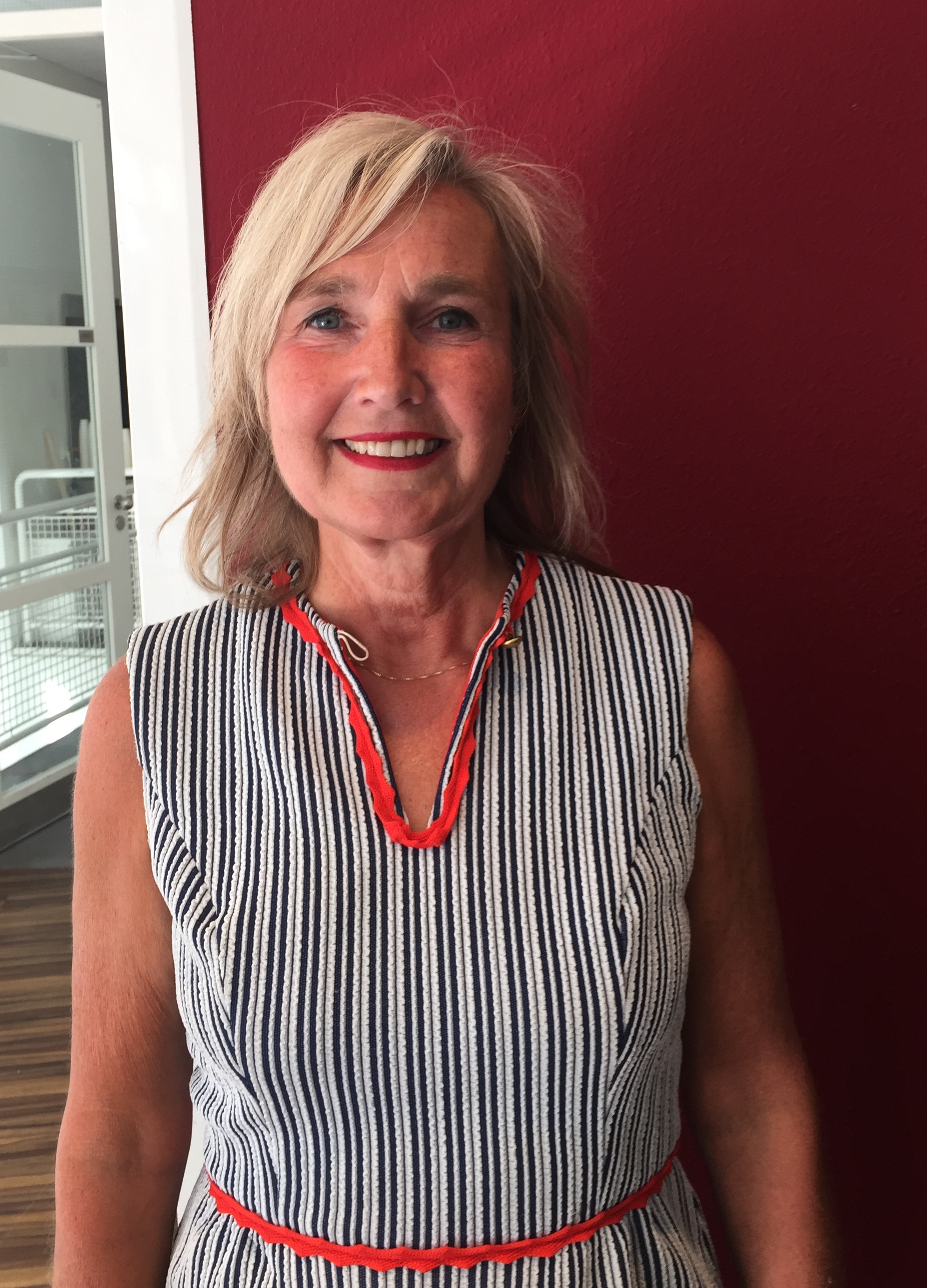
- Brouwer in 2020
- Born: 21 January 1964; Groningen, Netherlands
- Died: 18 June 2023 (aged 59); Scheveningen, Netherlands
- Occupations: Journalist television presenter radio presenter

Jellie Brouwer (21 January 1964 – 18 June 2023) was a Dutch journalist, moderator, columnist and presenter.

== Biography ==
Brouwer attended the School of Journalism in Utrecht. After writing for the VVDM and Het Vrije Volk, she ended up at Omroep West. There, she worked as a presenter and reporter. Brouwer then worked for years as an editor and reporter for various radio and television programs, such as TV3, RUR, Ischa and various radio programs for NOS, AVRO and Omroep West.

From 1992, Brouwer presented radio programs for the NOS (later the NPS): Radio Uit, Nieuws op 1, De Recensenten and from 2001 to February 2023 Kunststof. As a journalist, she focused on spoken and written interviews. She was a columnist for the monthly magazine Zin. She wrote an annual essay for VUmc. She presented ZAP U for the former Centrum Beeldende Kunst Utrecht (CBKU).

== Personal life ==
Brouwer was in a relationship with Philip Kroonenberg. They had three daughters.

=== Death ===
On the 12 June 2023 episode of Kunststof it was announced that Brouwer was seriously ill. Six days later, she died from cancer on 18 June 2023, at the age of 59.
