= Awa Ehoura =

Ivorian journalist and radio host (died 2023)

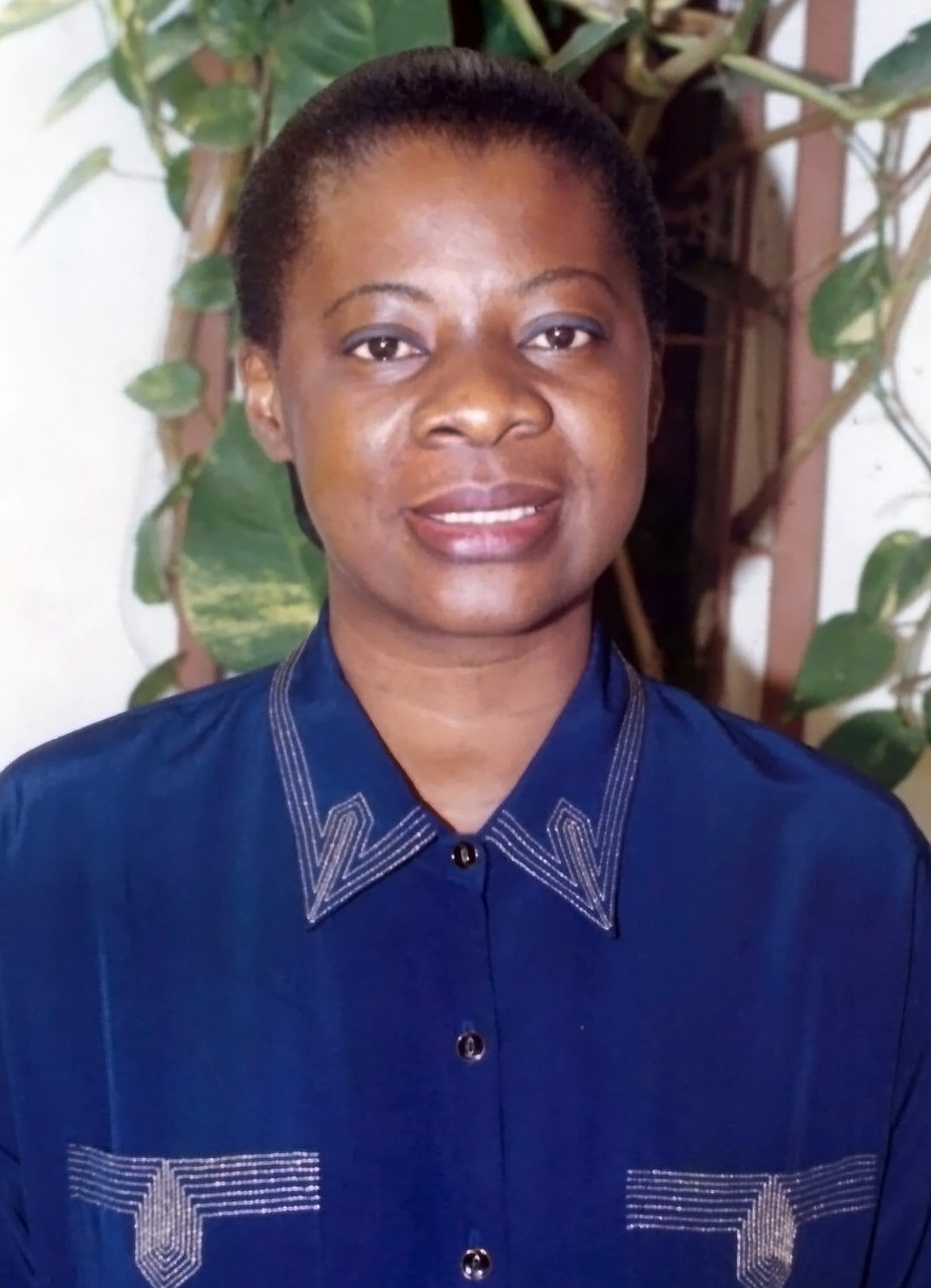
- Born: Awa Ehoura Tabitha
- Died: 5 July 2023; Abidjan, Ivory Coast
- Occupations: Journalist; Radio host
- Children: 1

Awa Ehoura Tabitha (died 5 July 2023) was an Ivorian journalist and radio host. She presented on television 13 heures and Journal télévisé du soir on La Première before being dismissed in June 2011, two months after the overthrow of Laurent Gbagbo.

== Biography ==
Ehoura began her audiovisual career with TV2 at the beginning of the 1990s alongside Serge Pacôme Aoulou. She was considered to be talented by then President Laurent Gbagbo, who appointed her as a special councillor in charge of communication. Following the birth of her child, she suffered from complications related to diabetes and found it difficult to work, particularly among the ongoing political crises in Ivory Coast. She presented the program Raison d’État from 2010 to 2011. Her contract with TV2 was then terminated.

Following the rise to power of Alassane Ouattara, Ehoura's bank accounts were frozen, leaving her impoverished and sick and at a time rumored to have died. In solidarity, Reporters Without Borders rewarded her with an assistance grant of 550 euros. Her bank accounts were subsequently unfrozen but fully emptied due to "unpaid debts".

Awa Ehoura died in Abidjan on 5 July 2023.
