= Alice Joy =

American singer

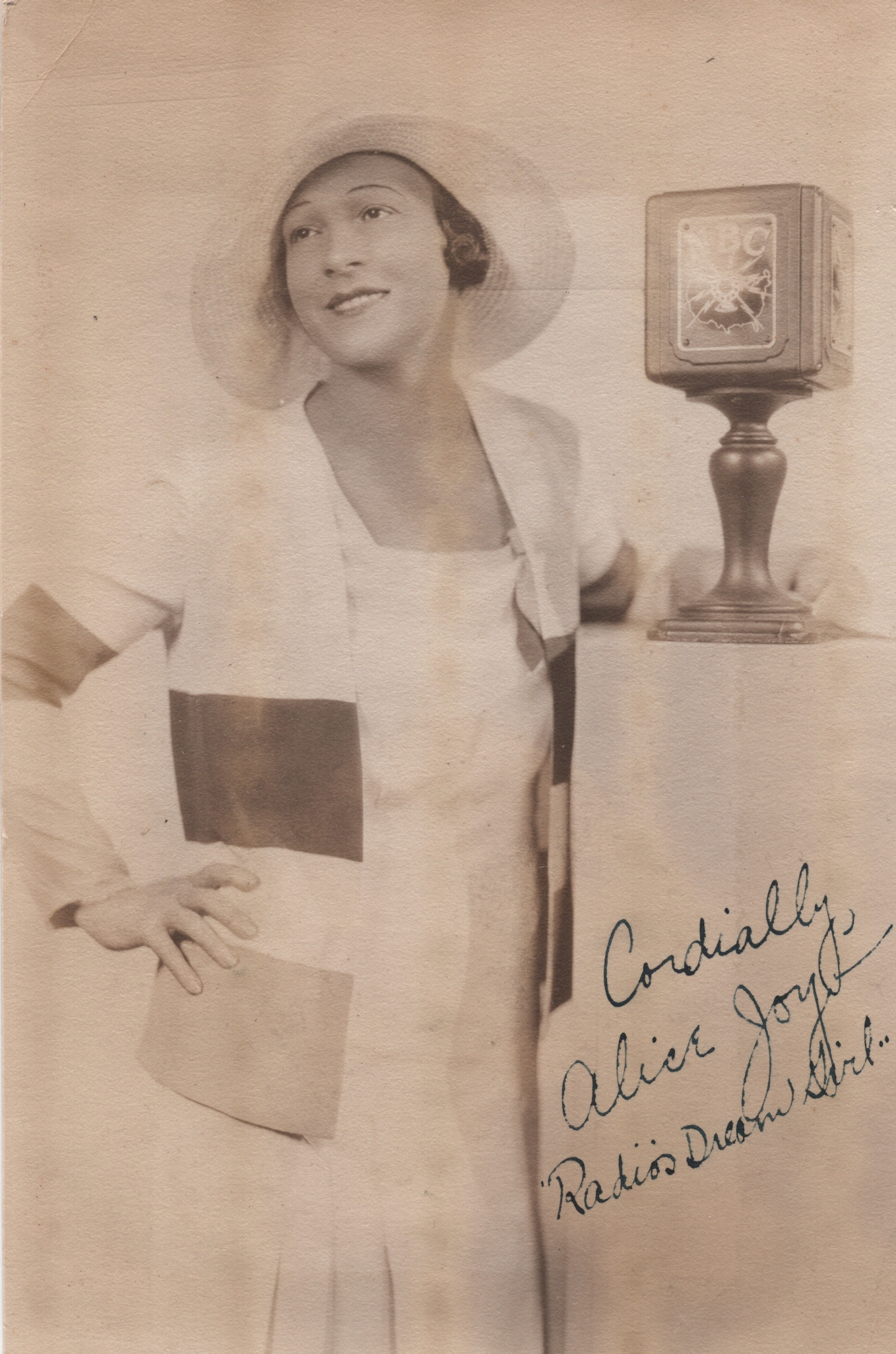
- Signed NBC publicity photo of Alice Joy "Radio's Dream Girl"
- Born: Frances Holcombe
- Occupation: Singer
- Spouse: E. Robert Burns
- Children: 2

Alice Joy (born Frances Holcombe) was an American contralto singer in vaudeville and on radio.

== Early years ==
Joy's father was a rural mail carrier in Streator, Illinois. By age 9, she was singing in Chautauqua sessions as part of a trio with her older sisters.

== Career ==
When she was 18, billed under her birth name, Joy performed in vaudeville as a member of Will J. Ward's Five Piano Girls. An item in the trade publication The Billboard noted, "Miss Holcombe has a wonderful voice and has been well received ..." as she performed with Ward's group.

By 1930, described as "radio's latest 'find'", she was singing on NBC radio on the Chase and Sanborn program. In 1931, she was singing with the Paul Van Yoan orchestra on a five-nights-a-week program and using her stage name. Also in 1931, she was dubbed the "Prince Albert Dream Girl" when she sang on a network program sponsored by Prince Albert pipe tobacco. The 15-minute Alice Joy, the Dream Singer show was broadcast from 1931 to 1932 on NBC, from 1932 to 1934 on the Blue Network, and in January and February 1938 on NBC. An article in Time magazine described her voice as having "a saxophone quality so deep that it might be a man's."

== Personal life ==
Joy married Captain E. Robert Burns, a press agent, and they had two children. She had met Burns in Canada during a Liberty Loan drive tour while he was a British pilot and recipient of the Distinguished Flying Cross.
