= Calamba, Misamis Occidental =

Municipality in Misamis Occidental, Philippines

Calamba
- Municipality
- Municipality of Calamba
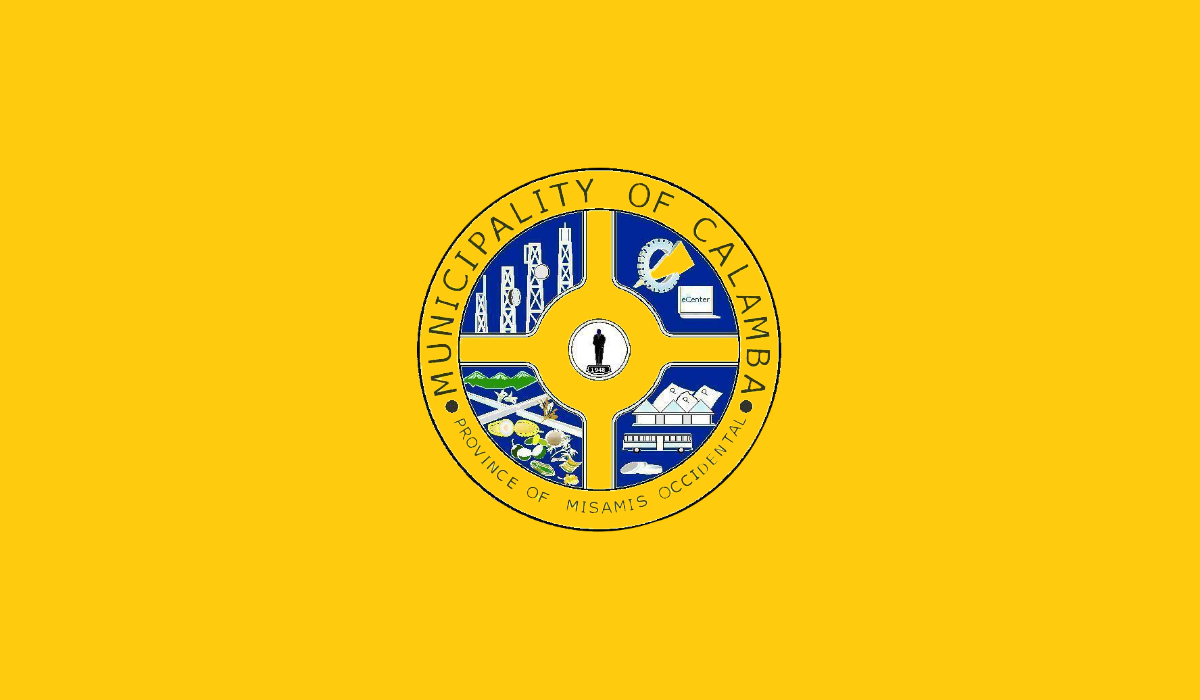
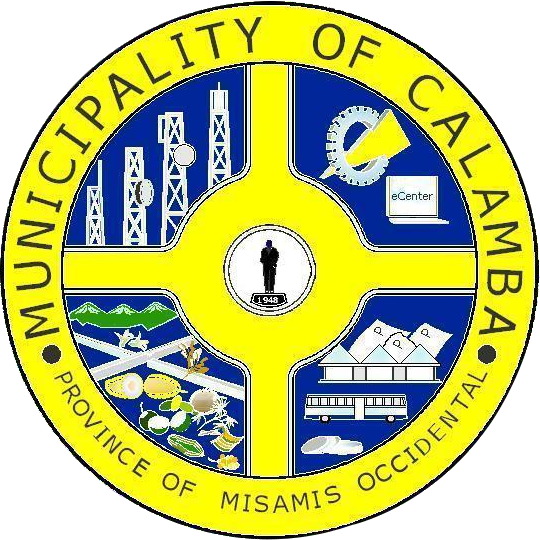
- Flag Seal

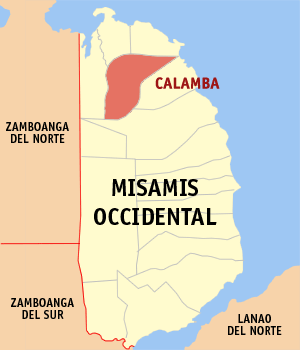
- Map of Misamis Occidental with Calamba highlighted
- Interactive map of Calamba
- Location within the Philippines
- Coordinates: 8°33′30″N 123°38′30″E
- Country: Philippines
- Region: Northern Mindanao
- Province: Misamis Occidental
- District: 1st district
- Founded: February 14, 1948
- Named for: Calamba, Laguna
- Barangays: 19 (see Barangays)

Government
  - Type: Sangguniang Bayan
  - Mayor: Luisito B. Villanueva Jr. (ASPIN)
  - Vice Mayor: Ezel T. Villanueva (ASPIN)
  - Representative: Jason P. Almonte (NP)
  - Municipal Council: Members: Ceasar Ian E. Enerio; Ken Allen B. Lawas; Garry A. Arapoc; Luther V. Iman; Sammy Ford G. Lansang; Rodrigo T. Garcia; Cherry F. Magsayo; Rediculo R. Valdehueza Jr.
  - Electorate: 15,751 voters (2025)

Area
  - Total: 104.64 km^{2} (40.40 sq mi)
- Highest elevation: 240 m (790 ft)
- Lowest elevation: 11 m (36 ft)

Population (2024 census)
  - Total: 23,808
  - Density: 227.52/km^{2} (589.28/sq mi)
  - Households: 5,729

Economy
  - Income class: 3rd municipal income class
  - Poverty incidence: 27.96% (2023)
  - Revenue: ₱ 175.6 million (2024)
  - Assets: ₱ 619 million (2024)
  - Expenditure: ₱ 156.5 million (2024)
  - Liabilities: ₱ 160.2 million (2024)

Service provider
  - Electricity: Misamis Occidental 1 Electric Cooperative (MOELCI 1)
- Time zone: UTC+8 (PST)
- ZIP code: 7210
- PSGC: 1004204000
- IDD : area code: +63 (0)88
- Native languages: Subanon; Cebuano; Tagalog
- Website: www.calambamisocc.gov.ph

Calamba, officially the Municipality of Calamba (Cebuano: Lungsod sa Calamba; Tagalog: Bayan ng Calamba), is a municipality in the province of Misamis Occidental, Philippines. According to the 2024 census, it has a population of 23,808 people.

Calamba was previously a barrio of Plaridel known as Solinog. It was renamed after Calamba in Laguna, the birthplace of Dr. José Rizal, the country's de facto national hero. Along with 6 other barrios and 13 sitios of Plaridel, they were separated and organized into an independent municipality through Executive Order No. 85 on September 3, 1947, with the establishment taking effect on February 14, 1948.

== Geography ==
=== Barangays ===
Calamba is politically subdivided into 19 barangays. Each barangay consists of puroks while some have sitios.

- Bonifacio
- Bunawan
- Calaran
- Dapacan Alto
- Dapacan Bajo
- Langub
- Libertad
- Magcamiguing
- Mamalad
- Mauswagon
- Northern Poblacion
- Salvador
- San Isidro
- Siloy
- Singalat
- Solinog
- Southwestern Poblacion
- Sulipat
- Don Bernardo A. Neri

=== Climate ===
Climate data for Calamba, Misamis Occidental
Month	Jan	Feb	Mar	Apr	May	Jun	Jul	Aug	Sep	Oct	Nov	Dec	Year
Mean daily maximum °C (°F)	27 (81)	27 (81)	29 (84)	30 (86)	30 (86)	29 (84)	29 (84)	29 (84)	30 (86)	29 (84)	29 (84)	28 (82)	29 (84)
Mean daily minimum °C (°F)	22 (72)	22 (72)	22 (72)	23 (73)	24 (75)	24 (75)	23 (73)	23 (73)	23 (73)	23 (73)	23 (73)	22 (72)	23 (73)
Average precipitation mm (inches)	69 (2.7)	44 (1.7)	37 (1.5)	29 (1.1)	87 (3.4)	137 (5.4)	131 (5.2)	141 (5.6)	143 (5.6)	134 (5.3)	68 (2.7)	53 (2.1)	1,073 (42.3)
Average rainy days	9.9	7.6	7.4	8.1	21.6	26.5	26.4	26.6	25.8	24.3	15.1	10.4	209.7
Source: Meteoblue (Use with caution: this is modeled/calculated data, not measured locally.)

== Demographics ==
Population census of Calamba

Year	Pop.	±% p.a.
1948	8,332	—
1960	10,689	+2.10%
1970	12,482	+1.56%
1975	13,645	+1.80%
1980	14,729	+1.54%
1990	15,111	+0.26%
1995	15,686	+0.70%

Year	Pop.	±% p.a.
2000	17,594	+2.49%
2007	19,597	+1.50%
2010	21,005	+2.56%
2015	21,676	+0.60%
2020	23,227	+1.47%
2024	23,808	+0.59%

Source: Philippine Statistics Authority

In the 2024 census, the population of Calamba was 23,808 people, with a density of 230 inhabitants per square kilometer or 600 inhabitants per square mile.

== Economy ==
Poverty incidence of Calamba (%)

Source: Philippine Statistics Authority

== Education ==
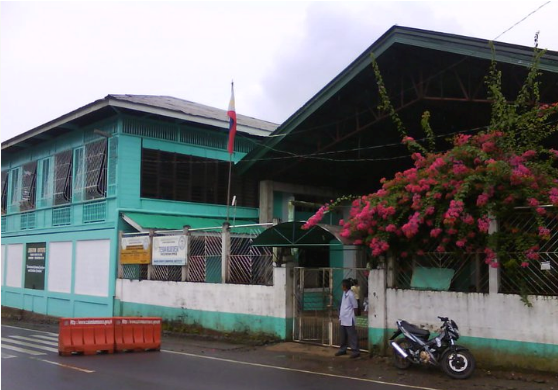
The Liberation Institute, Calamba

- Calamba Central School
- Calamba National Comprehensive High School
- Liberation Institute
- Sacred Heart College of Calamba, Inc.(SHCCI)
- College of Communication, Information & Technology (CCIT)
