= Pulzar FM =

- Christchurch, New Zealand; New Zealand
- Broadcast area: Canterbury, New Zealand
- Frequency: 100.9 FM
- RDS: PulzarFM
- Branding: Christchurch's Heartbeat - 100.9

Programming
- Format: Dance music & electronic music

Ownership
- Owner: Independent

History
- First air date: 1999
- Last air date: May 12, 2023

Technical information
- ERP: 5000
- Transmitter coordinates: 43.585021°S 172.656434°E

Links
- Webcast: See Website
- Website: http://www.pulzarfm.co.nz/

Pulzar FM was an independent radio station based in Christchurch, New Zealand. It broadcast on 100.9 FM, and targeted a 16-35 demographic with a m/f gender mix of 75/25, playing a wide range of the many different genres of dance and electronic music (EDM).

== History ==
Pulzar FM was founded by entrepreneurs Andrew Poulsen and Jason Akehurst in October 1999.

It broadcast as a Low Power FM station on several frequencies in Christchurch but most notably 88.7FM from its foundation in 1999 until November 2007 when the station went into hiatus. During the latter years of broadcast the station broadcast shows by international acts such as Matt Darey, Agnelli & Nelson, and Solarstone.

During 2008 the station founders won and purchased a full power FM frequency in Christchurch and the station resumed broadcast on 105.7FM on 18 April 2009. The conditions of the local commercial licence required local independent ownership and live programming. The relaunched station's format was more pop-oriented than in earlier years.

At 5pm on Wednesday, 7 December 2011, Pulzar FM went off the air due to financial difficulties and the ongoing cost of running. This was mostly due to after effects of the Canterbury earthquakes of 2010 and 2011.

Pulzar FM returned on 19 October 2012 with Jason Akehurst broadcasting for the first hour at mid-day. The first song to play was Monarch by Shapeshifter. The Sleepless4ChildCancer Marathon then began later that day, 75 hours with Snap Campbell and Georgina Stylianou. The official record attempt kicked off (after an earlier false start) at 10pm on Friday and ran through to 1am on Tuesday morning beating the previous record of 73 hours. Pulzar FM then returned to a similar format to before the December 2011 shutdown, but with Andy Poulsen on the Morning Energy show and Snap Campbell on the drive home.

In 2018, Pulzar FM moved in to the NZME Building in Christchurch after a joint agreement was signed with the company to provide the station with equipment and a brand new studio.

In January 2020, Pulzar FM switched from 105.7FM to 93.3FM. NZME held the licence for 93.3FM and acquired 105.7 in August 2020. The station moved to 100.9FM in September 2020 following the earlier closure of Voice of South Pole which was also subject to local commercial licence conditions.

Since May 2022, Pulzar FM operated from within the MediaWorks Canterbury building.

On the 27 April 2023 Pulzar staff announced it would close down on 12 May 2023. This coincided with the launch of MediaWorks' own dance music station George FM in Canterbury which is speculated to be one of the contributing factors of the closure. It was confirmed by Andrew Poulsen that the closure was because the current business model was unsustainable.

The station ceased at 12:30 am on 13 May 2023 and shortly afterward, an announcement stated that Pulzar is no longer broadcasting on this frequency and that Anthemz would return to the Christchurch airwaves on 100.9 the following week. The last song played was "One" by Shapeshifter at 12:24 a.m.

== Shows ==
The Pulzar FM breakfast show, 'The Morning Grind', was hosted by station co-owner Andy 'Pulzar' Poulsen from relaunch on 105.7FM on 18 April 2009 until local breakfast radio duo, Josh Armstrong and Gordon Findlater, took the slot in June 2009. The pair introduced a number of unique features for the show including their 'Bad Parenting Update', 'Cafe Giveaway' and 'Pulzar Doctors' segments.

The show joined with the national Family Planning organisation for a segment that was named 'Sperm Fest'. Josh, Gordon, Andy and afternoon drive host Lyndon Hunter had tests to figure out who had the highest sperm count. The segment helped to promote sexual health among Christchurch youth. The Morning Grind was later hosted by Gordon Findlater and Will Appelbe.

After the return of Pulzar FM in October 2012, the Breakfast show 'Morning Energy' was hosted by Andy Poulsen and the drive home show by Snap Campbell. The Hot 30 Countdown with Leyla Hutchison also returned on 27 October, with Gangnam Style voted as Number 1 on the countdown.

Pulzar FM was the NZ home for shows by a number of the world's top international DJ's, including Tiësto's Club Life, Armin van Buuren's A State of Trance, Nicole Moudaber's In The Mood, Solarstone's Pure Trance Radio, John Digweed's Transitions, Mark Knight's Toolroom, Paul Oakenfold's Planet Perfecto, Nicky Romero's Protocol Radio, Adam Beyer's Drumcode Live, Alison Wonderland's Radio Wonderland, Sister Bliss' In Session, and UMF Radio.

The "Banging Breakfast" show was hosted by Mike Nicholas from 2016 alongside co-hosts Hannah Smith (2016–17), Ella McLeod (2017-18) and Anthony Eason (2018-2019). The show's features included Fresh Cuts in Focus (sponsored by NZ on Air), Hot Right Now (Dance Music News), Tabasco or Truth and the Yeah or Nah Game. On March 6 2023, Mike Nicholas moved from The "Banging Breakfast" to the Drive Show. Special guests on the show have included Darude, Pendulum, John Summit, Alison Wonderland, Wilkinson, Icona Pop, Netsky, Hedex, Koven, and more.

== Other Stations ==
=== Anthemz ===
Anthemz is a classic dance anthems radio station based in Christchurch launched in October 2020 after Pulzar moved to 100.9FM, and broadcast on 93.3FM, 107.7 and 88.0LPFM.

In November 2022 the station went off the air due to the decommissioning of the transmitter site. They stated that they would be back on air within three weeks with better coverage but 93.3FM reverted to NZME's Flava in January 2023. The only way to listen to Anthemz is via their website stream, or through the iHeartRadio website/app.

Anthemz will replace Pulzar FM on 100.9 FM on Tuesday 16 May.
