= Mount Grey =

Mountain in New Zealand

Mount Grey / Maukatere
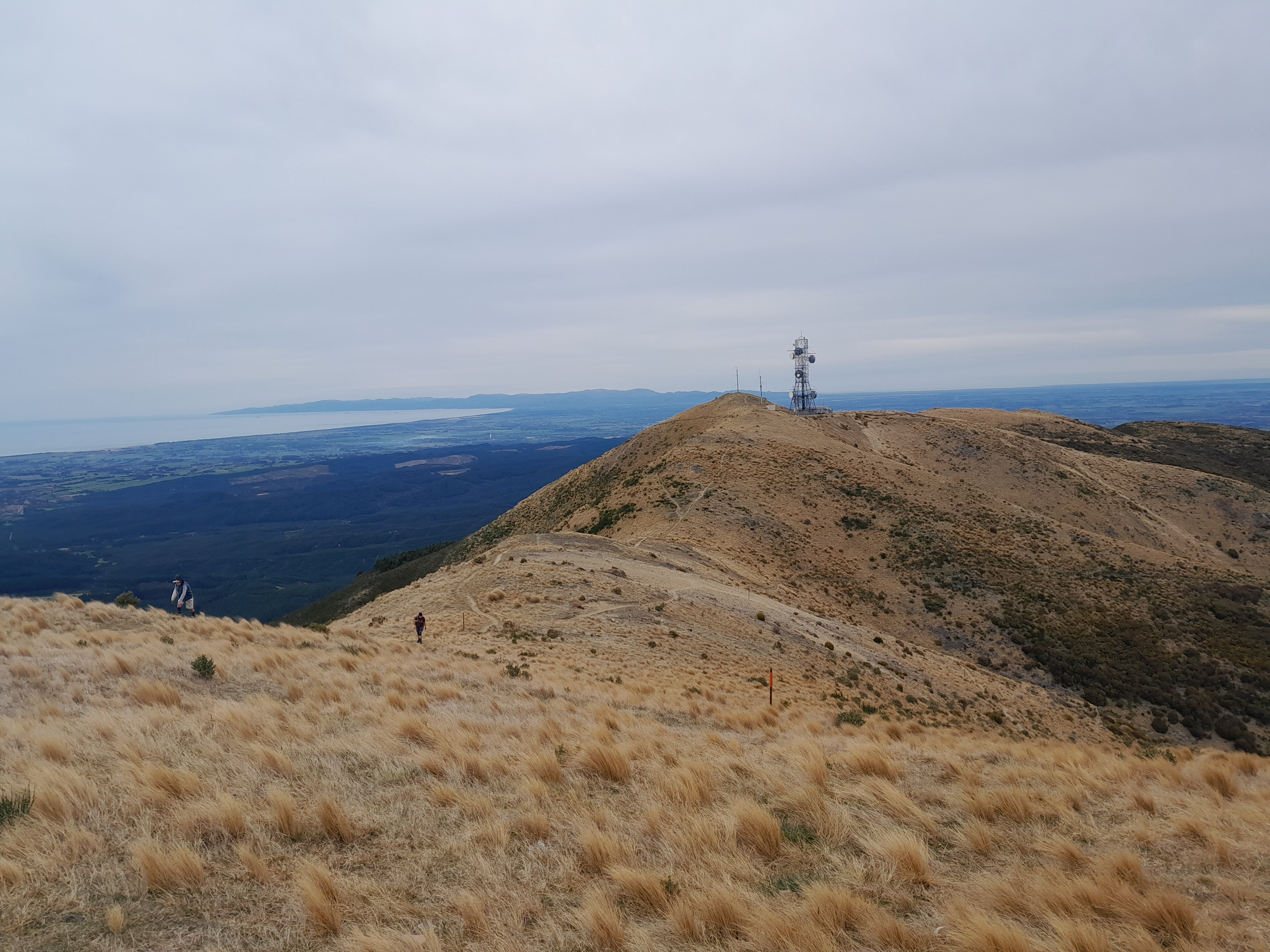
- Mount Grey / Maukatere, looking towards Christchurch

Highest point
- Elevation: 933 m (3,061 ft)
- Coordinates: 43.117316°S 172.547586°E

Naming
- Etymology: Named for George Grey, and from Ngāi Tahu Māori for floating mountain
- Native name: Maukatere (Māori)
- English translation: Floating mountain
- Defining authority: New Zealand Geographic Board

Geography
- Location within New Zealand
- Country: New Zealand
- Region: Canterbury

Climbing
- Access: Mt Grey Track, Red Beach Track

Mount Grey (officially Mount Grey / Maukatere) is a 934-metre (3,065 ft) mountain 15 kilometres (9.3 miles) west of Amberley in New Zealand. It is named after Sir George Grey who was governor of New Zealand when English surveyors climbed it in 1849. In Te Reo Māori, the mountain is called Maukatere, 'floating mountain', from where the spirits of the dead leave on the long journey to Cape Reinga.

Maukatere is a significant mountain for the Kaiapoi-based Ngāi Tūāhuriri, a hapū (subtribe) of Ngāi Tahu. Maukatere marked the inland boundary of the Crown purchase of the Canterbury and Otago area recorded in "Kemp's Deed" in 1848.

In 1998, the Ngāi Tahu Claims Settlement Act 1998 changed the official name of the mountain to Mount Grey / Maukatere.
