= The Sound Lounge =

Canadian radio show

The Sound Lounge was a Canadian radio show, which aired from 2007 to 2008 on CTVglobemedia's hot adult contemporary-formatted radio stations in Halifax, Toronto, Brockville, Peterborough, Kingston, Winnipeg, Calgary and Victoria.

The show handed over control of the content to the user's hands by an all listener chosen playlist, listener generated remixes and mash ups, and the opportunity to interact with listeners coast to coast via e-mail, text messaging and voice. It aired weekday evenings from the studios of CHUM-FM in Toronto.

Originally hosted by Cory Kimm, the show debuted on February 5, 2007. Chris Biggs became the program's new host on September 11, 2007, after Kimm moved to CHIQ in Winnipeg as the station's morning host, and Richie Favalaro became the host in early 2008 after Biggs left CHUM to join a competing Toronto radio station, CKFM. The show was cancelled on June 16, 2008.

== Stations ==
- Brockville - CFJR
- Calgary - CKCE
- Halifax - CIOO
- Kingston - CFLY
- Peterborough - CKPT
- Toronto - CHUM
- Victoria - CHBE
- Winnipeg - CHIQ
