= Cory Kimm =

Canadian radio personality

Cory Kimm (born May 1, 1974) is a Canadian radio personality originally from Edmonton, Alberta. Currently he hosts the Cory Kimm show on Up! 99.3 in Edmonton. Previously he has worked for CHFI-FM in Toronto, Ontario. He co-hosted The Cory Kimm and Ami A Show on Z103.5FM in Toronto, and before that on Rawlco Radio's 102.3 NOW! Radio in Edmonton.

Having previously worked at a radio station in Vernon, British Columbia, he moved to KISS 92 in Toronto after that station's change from country to pop music in 1999.

Later, he moved to CHUM-FM, where he hosted the CHUM Chart, among other duties. In 2007 he also became host of The Sound Lounge, which aired on many stations across Canada.

On September 4, 2007 he moved from Toronto to Winnipeg to host the morning show on CHUM Radio's Q94FM. In August 2008 Q94FM changed format and was rebranded as CURVE 94.3.

On December 9, 2008 he left CURVE 94.3 after being with the CHUM Radio Network for five years and re-appeared on air in February 2010 with Rawlco Radio's new 102.3 NOW! Radio.

== History ==
KISS 92, Toronto - Evening Show and other duties: ca. 1999 - 2003

CHUM-FM, Toronto - The CHUM Chart: 2003 - September 4, 2007

CHUM-FM, Toronto - Radio Personality: 2003 - September 4, 2007

CHUM-FM, Toronto - Saturday Night Dance Party: 2003 - September 4, 2007

CHUM Radio Network, Toronto - The Sound Lounge: February 5, 2007 - September 4, 2007

Q94FM, Winnipeg - Morning Show: September 4, 2007 - August 29, 2008

CURVE 94.3, Winnipeg - Morning Show: August 29, 2008 - December 9, 2008

102.3 NOW! Radio, Edmonton - The Cory Kimm and Ami A Show: February 23, 2010 - June, 2010

Z103.5 Morning Show, Toronto - The Cory Kimm and Ami A Show: May 9, 2011 - January 12, 2012

98.1 CHFI, Toronto - swing (relief) announcer, February, 2012 -
