= CFWM-FM =

Radio station in Winnipeg

Coordinates: 49.7994°N 97.2750°W

- Winnipeg, Manitoba; Canada
- Broadcast area: Winnipeg Metropolitan Region
- Frequency: 99.9 MHz
- Branding: Bounce 99.9

Programming
- Format: Adult hits

Ownership
- Owner: Bell Media; (Bell Media Regional Radio Partnership)
- Sister stations: CKMM-FM, CKY-DT

History
- First air date: 1928
- Former call signs: CJRW (1928–1935); CJRC (1935–1943); CKRC (1943–1996)
- Former frequencies: 600 kHz (AM) (1928–1931); 665 kHz (1931–1933); 880 kHz (1933); 685 kHz (1933–1935); 630 kHz (1935–1996)
- Call sign meaning: Winnipeg Manitoba

Technical information
- Class: C1
- ERP: 100,000 watts
- HAAT: 111.5 metres (366 ft)

Links
- Webcast: Listen Live
- Website: iheartradio.ca/bounce/winnipeg

CFWM-FM (99.9 MHz) is a commercial radio station in Winnipeg, Manitoba. It is owned by Bell Media and airs an adult hits format branded as Bounce 99.9. The studios and offices are at 1445 Pembina Highway, Winnipeg, with sister station CKMM-FM. The transmitter is on Road 54 Northeast, off McGillivray Boulevard, near Oak Bluff.

== History ==
=== AM Radio ===
The station signed on in 1928 as CJRW, at 600 AM. As with most early AM radio stations, it changed frequencies several times (see NARBA). It permanently settled at 630 in 1935 and adopted the call sign CKRC in 1943. The station was affiliated with the Canadian Broadcasting Corporation's Dominion Network from 1944 until the network dissolved in 1962.

In 1993, CKRC was purchased by two of its employees, Sales Executive Terry O'Rourke and General Manager Bill Gorrie. They owned and ran the station for 3 years.

=== Switch to FM ===
O'Rourke and Gorrie got permission from the Canadian Radio-television and Telecommunications Commission (CRTC) to move CKRC to the FM band in 1996. The new FM station adopted the current call letters, CFWM-FM. (The CKRC call letters now belong to an FM station in Weyburn, Saskatchewan.) They branded the new station as Magic 99.9, airing a soft adult contemporary format.

In 1997, O'Rourke and Gorrie sold CFWM-FM to Standard Radio. Standard Radio later acquired CKMM-FM and CFQX-FM from Craig Media. (CKMM is now owned by Bell Media, while CFQX is now owned by the Jim Pattison Group.) CFWM had to be sold, as the Canadian Radio-television and Telecommunications Commission (CRTC) would not let one company own more than two AM or FM stations in the same radio market. CFWM was sold to CHUM Limited in 2001 in exchange for CHOM-FM in Montreal.

=== Bob FM, Bounce Radio (2002–present) ===
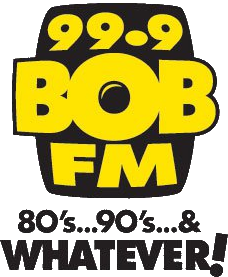
Former "Bob FM" logo used from March 2002 to May 2021.

On March 4, 2002, CFWM became the first radio station in Canada to adopt an adult hits format and gave birth to the "Bob FM" brand (which has been credited as one of the inspirations behind the more famous "Jack FM" branding).

In 2007, CFWM, along with the other CHUM Limited stations, were sold to CTVglobemedia (now Bell Media). Longtime Winnipeg morning show hosts Beau & Tom (since 1989) moved from CHIQ-FM to CFWM. On August 31, 2009, Frazier, who previously hosted the morning show on CHIQ with Beau & Tom from 1995 to 2000, rejoined Beau & Tom on CFWM.

On January 4, 2011, Beau, Tom, and Frazier moved back to CHIQ after its flip to classic hits, being replaced by Jay Richardson and Andrea Collin (who had served as CHIQ's morning hosts under its previous Curve format)..

On May 18, 2021, the station rebranded under Bell's national adult hits brand Bounce Radio, with no change in format.

=== Past personalities ===
Bob Washington, a personality on the station during the CKRC era, was well known outside of Winnipeg as the "voice" of K-tel, a Winnipeg-based direct response advertising company.

Bill Walker, who later became one of Canada's most recognizable television hosts of the 1950s and 60s, was morning man of CKRC from 1951 to 1955.

Other notable personalities from the CKRC era include Doc Steen, Boyd Kozak, Jim Paulson, Scott Walker (Bill's son), Bernie Pascal, Billy Gorrie, Bryan Fustukian (as Vik Armen) and Buster Bodean.

Hal Sigurdson hosted a Canadian Football League radio show on CKRC during the late-1950s and early-1960s.
