= CKMM-FM =

Radio station in Winnipeg, Manitoba, Canada

Coordinates: 49°45′20″N 97°07′53″W

- Winnipeg, Manitoba; Canada
- Broadcast area: Winnipeg Metropolitan Region
- Frequency: 103.1 MHz
- RDS: 103.1 Virgin Radio Winnipeg’s #1 Hit Music Station
- Branding: 103.1 Virgin Radio

Programming
- Format: Top 40/CHR
- Affiliations: Premiere Networks

Ownership
- Owner: Bell Media; (Bell NewCo)
- Sister stations: CFWM-FM, CKY-DT

History
- First air date: February 14, 1980
- Former call signs: CKWG-FM (1980–1989); CHZZ-FM (1989–1991); CKLU-FM (1991–1994)
- Call sign meaning: Music in Manitoba

Technical information
- Class: C
- ERP: 70,000 watts average; 100,000 watts peak
- HAAT: 206.1 metres (676 ft)

Links
- Webcast: Listen Live
- Website: iheartradio.ca/virginradio/winnipeg

CKMM-FM (103.1 MHz) is a contemporary hit radio station owned by Bell Media, branded as 103.1 Virgin Radio. The station broadcasts from 1445 Pembina Highway, Winnipeg, Manitoba, with sister station CFWM-FM, while its transmitter is located at Duff Roblin Provincial Park.

== History ==
On March 13, 1979, Armadale Communications was awarded a license for a new FM station in Winnipeg, to broadcast on 103.1 MHz. On February 14, 1980, the station signed on air as CKWG-FM, with a near freeform format. On August 21, 1989, the station flipped to adult contemporary. The following year, the station was sold to Western World Communications. The call signs have changed quite a bit over the years, from CHZZ-FM (Z103) to CKLU-FM (103 U FM, then briefly Mix 103) and then finally to CKMM-FM. The General Manager of "Mix" was Jim Millican - who, at one time, was tour manager of famed Winnipeg band, The Guess Who. Barry Horne was Program Director under Millican. Toronto jock and voiceover Adrian Bell replaced well-known jock Don Percy in Mornings, with beloved Winnipeg broadcaster Maureen Murphy sharing morning show duties. CKMM's format and on-air line up was short-lived.

Throughout the 1980s and early 1990s, CHZZ-FM was also used on the Videon Cable Program Guide. In 1996, the station switched to a country format with the on-air name Star 103. When CKMM and CFQX-FM came under the ownership of Craig Broadcasting, the format of CKMM was changed to avoid redundancy. CKMM re-launched with a Top 40/CHR format as Hot 103 on New Year's Eve, 1997. CKMM and CFQX became properties of Standard Radio in 2002.

On October 29, 2007, Astral Media took over CKMM as a result of a buyout of Standard Radio. As part of Astral's merger with Bell Media on June 27, 2013, sister station CFQX and Bell's CHIQ-FM were sold to the Jim Pattison Group in order to meet ownership limits.

Former "Virgin" logo (2012–2019)

On August 31, 2012, CKMM rebranded as 103.1 Virgin Radio, becoming the seventh "Virgin" branded station in Canada.
