= CHUM (AM) =

Sports radio station in Toronto

- Toronto, Ontario; Canada
- Broadcast area: Greater Toronto Area
- Frequency: 1050 kHz
- Branding: TSN Radio 1050

Programming
- Language: English
- Format: Sports radio
- Network: TSN Radio
- Affiliations: Toronto Maple Leafs; Toronto Raptors; Toronto Argonauts; Buffalo Bills Radio Network

Ownership
- Owner: Bell Media; (Bell Media Regional Radio Partnership)
- Sister stations: CFRB; CHUM-FM; CKFM-FM; TSN; CP24; CFTO-DT; CKVR-DT

History
- First air date: October 28, 1945
- Call sign meaning: "chum" meaning friend

Technical information
- Licensing authority: CRTC
- Class: B
- Power: 50,000 watts
- Transmitter coordinates: 43°29′14.00″N 79°37′15.00″W
- Repeater: 99.9 CKFM-HD3 (Toronto)

Links
- Webcast: Listen live
- Website: www.tsn.ca/radio/toronto-1050/

CHUM (1050 kHz) is a Canadian AM radio station in Toronto, Ontario. The station is owned and operated by Bell Media. CHUM's studios are co-located with TSN at 9 Channel Nine Court in the Agincourt neighbourhood of Scarborough (with auxiliary studios located at 250 Richmond Street West in the Entertainment District of downtown Toronto), with its transmitter array located in the Clarkson neighbourhood of Mississauga (near CFRB's own transmitter array). TSN 1050 is simulcast on Bell Satellite TV channel 989, and on Shaw Direct channel 867. The station is also carried on the 3rd HD digital subchannel of CKFM-FM.

== Station history ==
CHUM AM has been broadcasting continuously since 1945, through a variety of format changes. The station's history can be broken into eight distinct eras, as follows:

Era	Start date	Format	Brand and/or slogan
1	October 28, 1945	"Full service"—music, news, sports. Station only on air from sun-up to sundown through most of this era	1050 CHUM
2	May 27, 1957	Top 50 hits (Later reduced to Top 30 as of August 1968)	1050 CHUM
3	June 6, 1986	Adult Contemporary	1050 CHUM-AM: Favourites Of Yesterday and Today (1986-89); 1050 CHUM: Toronto's Soft Rock (1989)
4	September 1, 1989	Oldies (Some sports coverage, including broadcasts of Toronto Argonauts games, and from 1998 on, Toronto Blue Jays games)	1050 CHUM: Good Times and Great Oldies
5	May 7, 2001	Sports and sports talk	The Team 1050
6	August 27, 2002	Oldies	1050 CHUM: Toronto's Greatest Hits
7	March 26, 2009	All-news (almost all rebroadcast of audio feed of all-news TV station CP24)	CP24 Radio 1050
8	April 13, 2011	Sports and sports talk	TSN Radio 1050

=== The "full service" era: 1945-1957 ===
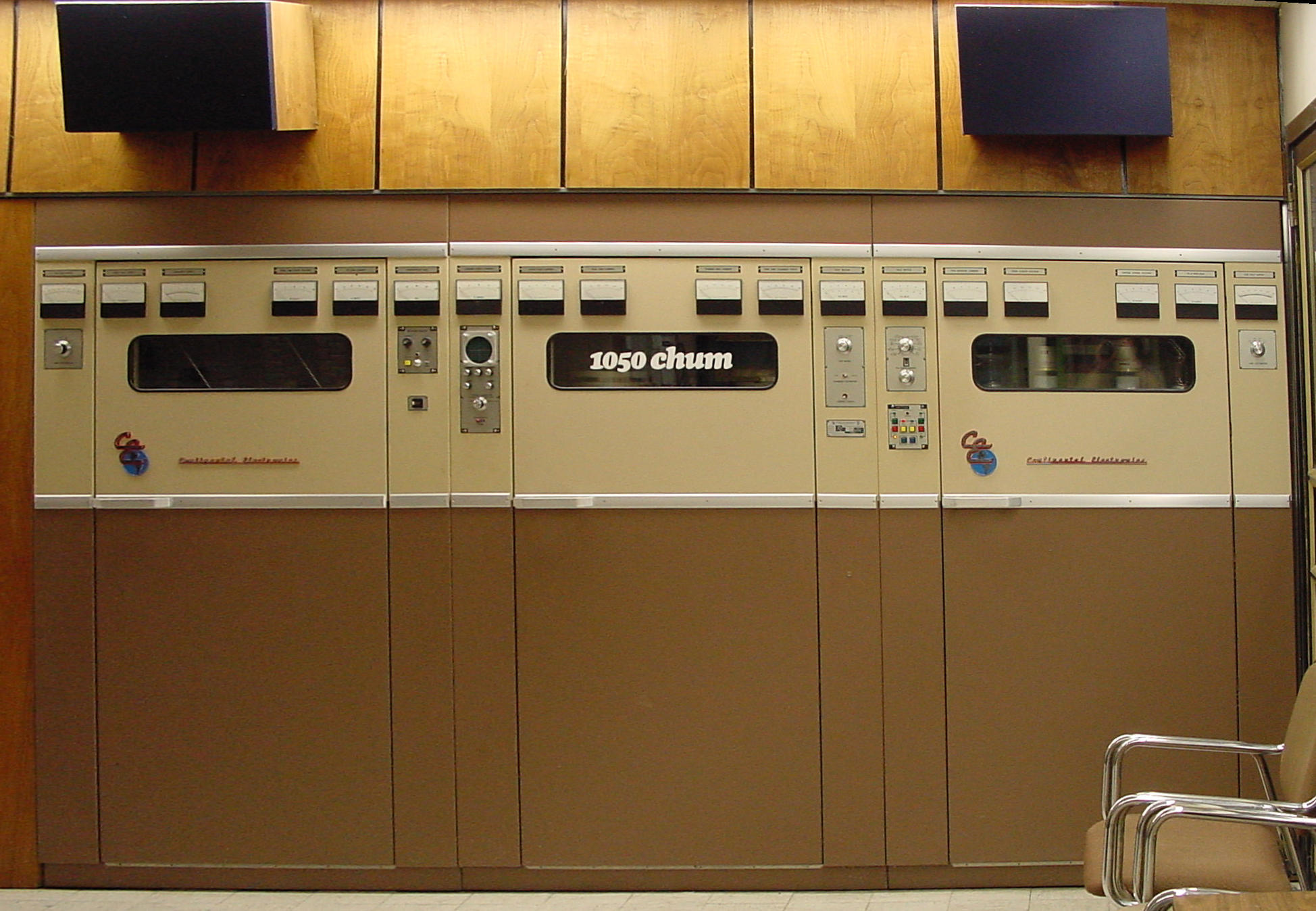
The second 50 kW CHUM transmitter installed in 1978 in Clarkson, Mississauga.

CHUM was founded by York Broadcasters Limited (later CHUM Limited), four Toronto businessmen, including Al Leary, a former sportscaster, who had been the station manager at CKCL for 14 years. CHUM received its licence in late November 1944 to operate a station with 1,000 watts. CHUM launched as a dawn-to-dusk radio station on October 28, 1945, with John H.Q. "Jack" Part, an entrepreneur in the business of patent medicines, as its president. The station, operating from 1947 in studios at 225 Mutual St., broadcast a format typical of the late 1940s, with a combination of information, music, and sports. When CHUM was about to debut, Leary told the press that the new station would be known for community service and in-depth news, in addition to live talent and the most popular phonograph records.

CHUM was taken over in December 1954 by Allan Waters, a salesman from Part's patent medicine business. Waters' first major move was to secure a licence for 24-hour-a-day broadcasting for CHUM, along with a power increase to 5,000 watts.

=== The Top 40 era: 1957-1986 ===
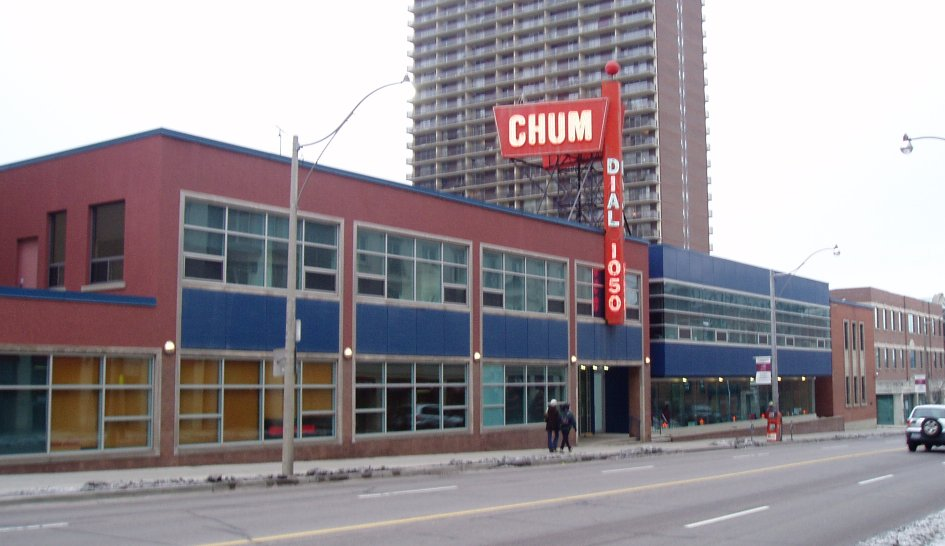
The Chum Radio Building at 1331 Yonge Street was the home of 1050 CHUM from 1959 until 2009

Less than three years after Waters acquired the station, and soon after bringing the new full-time transmitter online, a major programming change was made. On May 27, 1957, at 6 AM, Waters switched the station to a "Top 50" format that had proven itself popular in some U.S. cities and issued the first CHUM Chart that day. Elvis Presley's "All Shook Up" was the first song played. 1050 CHUM pioneered rock and roll radio in Toronto, and was noteworthy for hosting many noteworthy rock concerts including, among others, visits to Maple Leaf Gardens by Presley (1957) and the Beatles (1964, 1965, and 1966).

The station rose in popularity in Toronto in the late 1950s and early 1960s; though it never supplanted perennial Toronto ratings champ CFRB at the top of the ratings chart, it was still a major broadcasting powerhouse with a particular appeal to the teen market. As the station became more successful, it also built yet another new transmitter in Mississauga, Ontario (a few miles west of the current Toronto city line) along the Lake Ontario shoreline, and raised its power once again to its current 50,000 watts around the clock.

In the late 1950s, CHUM was calling itself "Radio One", as its ratings continued to increase. An important part of CHUM's success was the station's unpredictable morning man Al Boliska, who joined CHUM in October 1957, after working at station CKLC in Kingston, Ontario. By 1959, Boliska had made a name for himself as a disc jockey who got listeners talking. He also made them laugh, and became known for telling what he called the "World's Worst Jokes". Boliska also did a number of stunts, such as taking part in a professional wrestling match with Whipper Billy Watson. When he lost, that led to another stunt, where Boliska stayed away from his show for several days, saying he was now too discouraged by the loss to do his show. A hypnotist was called in, and Boliska's self-esteem was restored. Boliska left CHUM in late 1963 to go 'across the street' to CKEY. He was replaced by WKBW Buffalo radio and TV personality Jay Nelson, popularly known as "Jungle Jay" from his role as host of a children's show on Buffalo's Channel 7 which was also popular among Toronto youngsters. He would be followed by housewives' jock John Spragge; singer/DJ Mike Darow; Pete Nordheimer, replaced in 1961 by Bob McAdorey, teen DJ Dave Johnson, and all night DJ Bob Laine. Later additions to the CHUM DJ lineup included Duff Roman and Brian Skinner, both of whom came from rival Toronto rocker CKEY (then owned by Jack Kent Cooke).

In the late 1960s and early 1970s, CHUM DJs included Duke Roberts (also known as Gary Duke for a time), Johnny Mitchell (better known today as Sonny Fox), J. Michael Wilson, Tom Rivers, Scott Carpenter, Jim Van Horne, John Rode, Don Reagan, John Majhor, Mike Cooper, Daryl B, Terry Steele, Mike Holland and morning man Roger Ashby. Among their later night-time hosts was J. D. Roberts, who joined CHUM for a time in 1977, eventually becoming known across North America as White House correspondent for CBS News, then was co-anchor of CNN's morning program American Morning and is currently a co-anchor again now with Fox News. Rick Moranis, later famous for his work on SCTV and Ghostbusters, was briefly a late-night CHUM DJ in the mid-seventies under the name "Rick Allan".

CHUM began to have zany contests. In the 1950s and 1960s, it was contests such as 'The Walking Man', where listeners had to spot CHUM's mystery walking man using only clues given out on the air. The 1970s' "I Listen to CHUM" promotion had DJs dialing phone numbers at random and awarding $1,000 to anyone who answered the phone with that phrase. In 1976, there was the CHUM Starsign promotion. Listeners wore a button featuring their astrological sign. If CHUM's 'Starsign spotter' saw a person wearing his or her Starsign, that person won prizes such as money or concert tickets to major events.

The CHUM Chart was, for many years, the most influential weekly Top 40 chart in Canada and, at the time of its retirement in 1986, was hailed as the longest-running continuously published radio station record survey in North America. (This was later surpassed by Hamilton's CKOC, which published weekly charts from 1960-1992.) The first CHUM Chart was released on May 27, 1957, with Elvis Presley's "All Shook Up" the first Number 1 song.

RPM Magazine paid tribute to CHUM's 11th anniversary with their May 25, 1968, issue.

=== From top 40 to gold-based AC: 1986–1989 ===
Logo of 1050 CHUM used in 1998, featuring the Toronto Blue Jays, foreshadowing a shift towards an all-sports format. The slogan "Good Times and Great Oldies" is also featured.

By the mid-1980s, CHUM had lost ground in the Toronto ratings to competing Top 40 station CFTR and FM-based music stations. On June 6, 1986, at 3 p.m., after playing Starship's "We Built This City", CHUM dropped its Top 40 format for a gold-based adult contemporary format ("Favourites of Yesterday and Today"). The first song after the relaunch was "Beginnings" by Chicago. The change also discontinued the CHUM Chart, which ended the week of June 14, 1986, with Madonna's "Live to Tell" as the final Number 1 song. By January 1989, the station had evolved into a brighter adult contemporary format ("Toronto's Soft Rock"), focusing on pop hits from the past decade and dropping much of the older music. While the adult contemporary format started off with modest ratings, CHUM began to slip further over the next few years; in the September 1989 ratings book, CHUM was ranked 11th and held a 2.9 share of the Toronto market.

=== The first "Oldies" era: 1989–2001 ===
On September 1, 1989, at 5 p.m., CHUM adopted an oldies format, drawing heavily on its previous Top 40 reputation to cater to the fans of that era's music.

During the 1990s, the on-air lineup included Daryl B, Bob Magee, Kori Skinner, Andy K, Russ McLeod, Roger Kelly (Roger Kettyls), Marc Chambers and Dan Michaels. In 1989, the station acquired the broadcast rights for the Toronto Argonauts. Led by play-by-play man Marc Charbonneau and colour commentator Peter Martin, the CHUM broadcast team helped to celebrate the team's Grey Cup victory in 1991 in Winnipeg. In 1992, the Argonauts broadcast rights would return to CFRB. By 1997, much of the airstaff was replaced with voicetracking, while the morning show remained live.

In November 1997, CHUM obtained the radio broadcast rights to Toronto Blue Jays baseball from CJCL beginning in the 1998 season, resulting in a shift towards sports programming on the station.

=== The Team 1050: 2001–2002 ===
Team 1050 logo

On January 23, 2001, CHUM Limited announced the launch of a national sports radio network, titled "The Team", with CHUM serving as the network's flagship (to be called "Team 1050"). As part of the synergy, Toronto Blue Jays broadcasts were available nationwide on the Team Radio Network. This also meant the end of music on 1050 CHUM, which occurred on May 7, 2001. Duff Roman and Bob Laine hosted a farewell show, ending with Elvis Presley's "All Shook Up" (the station's first song as a Top 40 station in 1957) and an audio montage of CHUM memories. Then, at 3 p.m., "The Team Radio Network" was launched on CHUM and CHUM-owned stations across Canada. Noted Canadian sportscaster Jim Van Horne, who had recently left TSN, was the network's marquee host. (In the 1970s, before he turned to sports broadcasting, Van Horne had been a rock jock on 1050 CHUM.) The Team 1050 morning show was made up of former TSN host Paul Romanuk, longtime CHUM sportscaster Brian 'Henny' Henderson and Mike Richards. While the station retained the CHUM call letters, on air the station was not referred to as 1050 CHUM, but rather as "The Team 1050." Nevertheless, "1050 CHUM" wasn't entirely put to rest, as the oldies format continued on a 24-hour webcast at the 1050chum.com website.

"The Team" network did not prove successful, especially in Toronto, where CHUM struggled against long-time sports station The Fan 590 (CJCL). On August 27, 2002, the network was closed down, and while a few affiliates nationwide retained the sports format, most reverted to their pre-Team formats — including CHUM, which reverted to oldies.

=== The second "Oldies" era: 2002–2009 ===
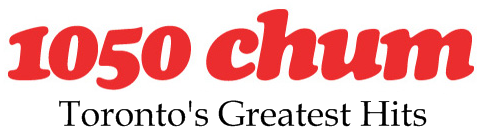
Logo of 1050 CHUM with the Toronto's Greatest Hits slogan used after the 2002 relaunch

At 3 p.m. on August 27, 2002, the montage that closed down "1050 CHUM" reintroduced the oldies format, followed by the Elvis vs. JXL remix of "A Little Less Conversation" and Presley's "All Shook Up". The station reverted to a playlist of music (along with occasional liners and identifications) that were popular in CHUM's 50s-to-80s Top 40 heyday. The station also featured The Morning Show with Gord James and the James Gang, as well as call-in lifestyle programs during weekend mornings. Like the latter years of the first incarnation of the oldies format, the morning show was live while other air shifts were voicetracked. In addition, the station also lost rights to broadcast Blue Jays games after the 2002 season, where they moved back to The Fan 590, coinciding with that station's purchase by Rogers Communications, which by that time owned the Blue Jays.

In 2007, CHUM and the rest of the CHUM Limited stations (with the exception of Citytv) were sold to CTVglobemedia. That same year, CHUM commemorated the 50th anniversary of the launch of its rock and roll format, the highlights of which included vignettes and specials throughout the year, as well as anniversary celebrations on May 26, 2007 that included an open house at CHUM's studios at 1331 Yonge Street, in conjunction with Doors Open Toronto, and a concert at Nathan Phillips Square.

==== Move from the CHUM Radio building ====
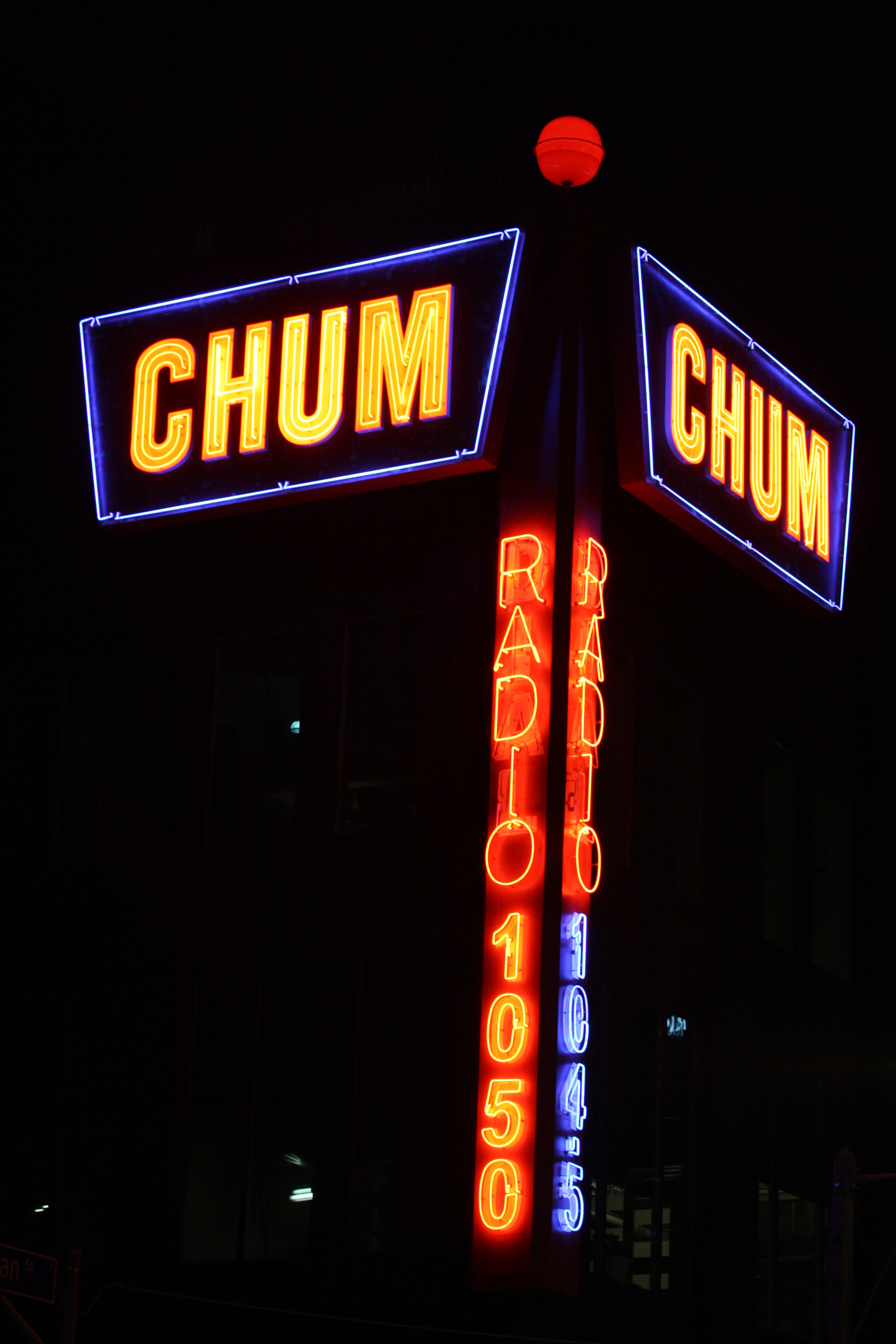
The CHUM neon sign in 2010, relocated to 250 Richmond Street West

In 2008, CTVglobemedia announced they had sold 1331 Yonge Street to a condominium developer and had acquired a new property, 250 Richmond Street West, to serve as the new home of CHUM and CHUM-FM. On August 18, 2009, CHUM left 1331 Yonge Street, ending 50 years at its historic home. 1331 Yonge was demolished in September 2016, in order for a condominium complex to be built on the site. The new building is adjacent (and connected) to Bell Media's Headquarters at 299 Queen Street West.

A similar move was made in May 2014, when CFRB left their longtime location at Yonge and St. Clair for 250 Richmond Street West after Bell's acquisition of Astral Media, which brought CFRB and CHUM under the same ownership.

=== CP24 Radio 1050: 2009–2011 ===
CP24 Radio 1050 logo

Almost seven years after the demise of The Team, and amidst other cost-cutting measures at CTVglobemedia and other Canadian broadcasters due to the global economic crisis and the 2007 Canada broadcast TV realignment, CTV announced on March 25, 2009 that CHUM would again drop its oldies format. At 5:00 a.m. the following day, the station flipped to all-news radio as CP24 Radio 1050. Unlike other CHUM-owned news/talk stations, the station did not originate its own news content. Instead, it was merely an audio simulcast of CP24, a GTA-centric television news channel also acquired by CTVglobemedia in the CHUM sale. The move coincided with the launch of CP24's new morning program, CP24 Breakfast (which replaced the Citytv-originated Breakfast Television).

The change came a few weeks after the CRTC revised its formatting regulations to permit oldies music on FM radio for the first time, although at the time of the change no Toronto-area FM station had performed such a flip (CHBM-FM and Hamilton's CING-FM both adopted a classic hits format later in the year). CKOC in Hamilton retained a more traditional AM oldies format, while oldies/adult standards station CFZM marketed itself as an alternative as well.

A number of media critics, including Toronto Sun columnist and former radio personality Ted Woloshyn, criticized CP24 Radio 1050 as a poor substitute for a true news radio format. In his column on the format change, Woloshyn noted a number of instances where he could tell he was listening to content that had been prepared for television, not radio, presentation:

On Thursday morning I listened to a sportscaster tell me to "watch this great pass," but all I saw was my clock radio, and I have no idea what took place. On that same day, host Ann Rohmer (a fine broadcaster, by the way) had to apologize to her viewers because they were having technical difficulties with their picture. The irony nearly drove me off the road. That was followed by the weather man proclaiming, "as you can see there's a cold front coming in from Wisconsin," or something equally as exclusionary. What really irks me is they're breaking the cardinal rule of radio: No dead air.

According to quarterly BBM surveys of Toronto radio, in 2010 the station's audience share never rose above 0.1% of radio listeners, and CP24 Radio 1050 consistently placed dead last in the ratings in the Toronto radio market.

=== TSN Radio 1050: 2011–present ===
Shortly after the re-acquisition of CTVglobemedia by Bell Canada was announced in the fall of 2010, and with CP24 Radio 1050 not proving to be successful, media analysts began to speculate that CTV would be converting many of its existing AM radio stations including CP24 Radio 1050 into a national sports radio network co-branded with its sports television channel TSN sometime in 2011, which would compete against rival Rogers-owned Toronto radio station, The Fan 590, as the two stations previously did from 2001 to 2002.

The plans were unveiled on February 17, 2011, when CTV announced that CHUM would drop its CP24 simulcast and flip to sports radio as TSN Radio 1050 on April 13, 2011, the first station under the newly formed brand. TSN considered the flip to be a "soft launch" for the TSN Radio brand, expecting a full launch with more local programming by September. This change came just days after Bell Canada completed its acquisition of 100 per cent of the shares in CTVglobemedia it didn't already own, on which it renamed the company Bell Media and likewise renamed the radio division CHUM Radio to Bell Media Radio.

Ratings for CHUM/TSN radio consistently place the station at or near the bottom of Toronto radio ratings. Average cumulative listening hours from spring 2021 through summer 2022 were lower than every surveyed Toronto station except CFPT-FM. Against its direct competition of FAN 590 (the city's other all-sports radio outlet), 1050 CHUM drew about a quarter of the FAN's cumulative listening hours (39,000 for CHUM compared to 153,800 for FAN 590).

==== Live sports programming ====
TSN Radio 1050 shares the official broadcasting rights of the Toronto Maple Leafs and the Toronto Raptors. It is the official radio broadcaster for the Toronto Argonauts of the Canadian Football League as well as Toronto FC, the World Junior Ice Hockey Championship, Men's World Hockey Championship (Ice Hockey World Championships), NFL, NBA, Summer and Winter Olympics, 2022 FIFA World Cup, and UEFA Euro 2020.

==== Studios ====
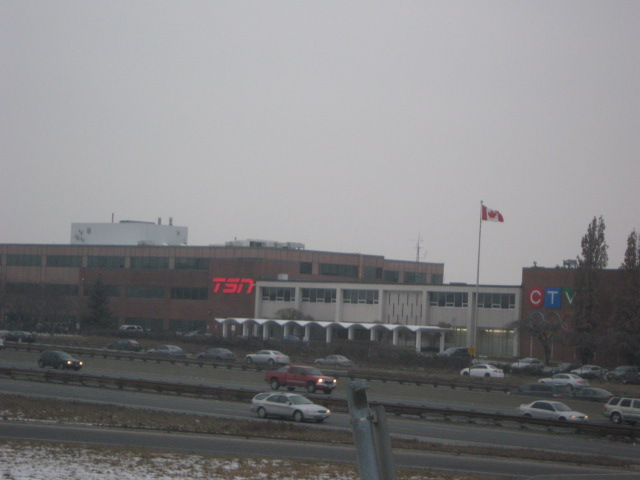
TSN Radio 1050's main studios are located at Bell Media's 9 Channel Nine Court, where TSN, CTV Toronto, and Discovery are based.

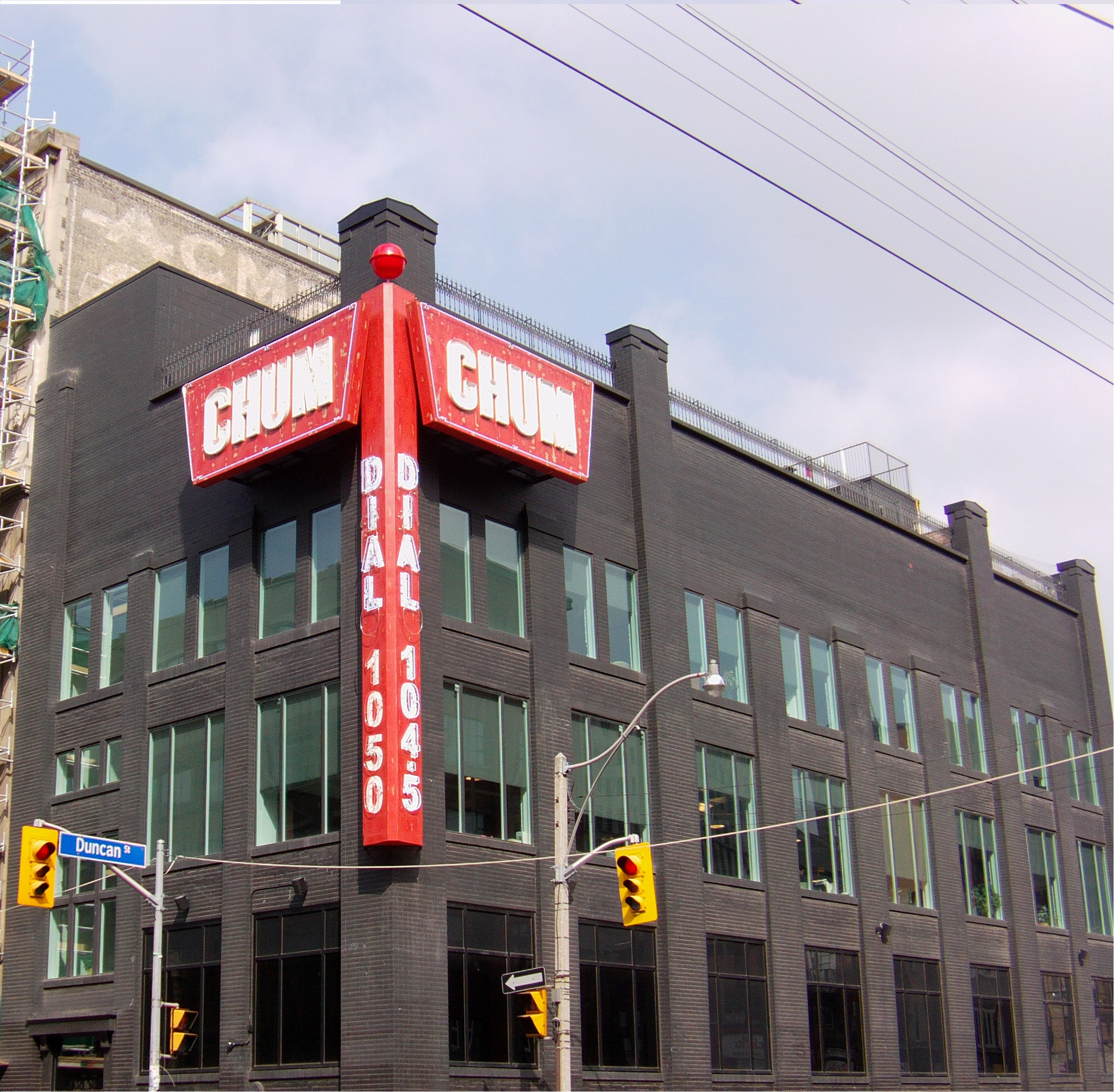
TSN Radio's secondary studios are located at Bell Media's 250 Richmond Street West which is connected to the 299 Queen Street West building. Note the relocated and refurbished neon sign.

Studios for TSN Radio 1050 are located at 9 Channel Nine Court in Scarborough, Ontario where TSN's television operations are based. This allows for programs broadcast on TSN Radio 1050 to simultaneously air on TSN or TSN2. TSN Radio 1050's secondary studios are located at Bell Media Radio Toronto's studios located at 250 Richmond Street West in Downtown Toronto (which also houses sister radio stations, CHUM-FM, CKFM-FM and CFRB) which is adjacent to 299 Queen Street West (where Bell Media's specialty channels such as MuchMusic and CP24 are based, as well as CTV's The Marilyn Denis Show, etalk and The Social).

==== Notable staff ====
- Carlo Colaiacovo (First Up with Korolnek & Colaiacovo)
- Bryan Hayes (Overdrive)
- Jamie McLennan (Overdrive)
- Jeff O'Neill (Overdrive)
- Joe Bowen (Toronto Maple Leafs play-by-play commentator)
- Jim Ralph (Toronto Maple Leafs colour commentator)
- Paul Jones (Toronto Raptors analyst)
- Jack Armstrong (Toronto Raptors analyst)

==== Notable alumni ====
CHUM has had a number of notable broadcasters in its history:

- Monty Hall
- Larry D. Mann
- Johnny Lombardi
- Sam Yuchtman
- Harvey Kirck (news)
- Joyce Davidson
- Bob McAdorey
- Al Boliska
- Larry Solway (commentary and news/talk)
- Pierre Berton (commentary)
- Trent Frayne
- June Callwood
- Phil Givens (commentary)
- Brian Williams (news)
- John Gilbert (talk)
- Jim Van Horne
- Colleen Jones (sports)
- Mark Dailey (news)
- Rick Moranis
- John Majhor
- Wolfman Jack
- John Roberts (as J.D. Roberts)
- Jeanne Beker
- Mike Ross
- Mike Richards
- Tony Parsons
- Rick Jeanneret
- Big Jack Armstrong
- Mike Darow
- Stan Klees
- Paul Romanuk
- Chuck Riley
- Bob Mackowycz
- Brad Giffen

== Home of CHUM AM ==
CHUM has had several homes since 1945:

- 21 Dundas Square (1945–1947) - top floor of Hermant Building c. 1914 and now part of HNR Tower
- 225 Mutual Street (1947–1954) - later RCA-Victor Records recording studio and demolished 2010
- 250 Adelaide Street West (1954–1959) - now occupied by Adelaide Hall, Rock'n'Horse Saloon, and The Porch.
- 1331 Yonge Street (1959–2009) - sold to Aspen Ridge to develop site as The Jack condo development
- 250 Richmond Street West (2009–present) - home to Bell Media Radio and CHUM-FM. Built in 1924 as addition to 260 Richmond Street West
- 9 Channel Nine Court (2010–present) - longtime home of CFTO-DT and TSN. Equipped for simultaneous television broadcasts of radio programs.
