= CKFM-FM =

Radio station in Toronto

Coordinates: 43°38′33″N 79°23′14″W

- Toronto, Ontario; Canada
- Broadcast area: Greater Toronto Area
- Frequency: 99.9 MHz (HD Radio)
- Branding: 99.9 Virgin Radio

Programming
- Language: English
- Format: Contemporary hit radio
- Subchannels: HD2: CFRB-AM; HD3: CHUM-AM
- Affiliations: Premiere Networks

Ownership
- Owner: Bell Media
- Sister stations: CFRB-AM; CHUM-AM; CHUM-FM; CP24; CFTO-DT; CKVR-DT

History
- First air date: 1947
- Former call signs: CFRB-FM (1947-1963)
- Call sign meaning: Frequency Modulation (broadcast band)

Technical information
- Licensing authority: CRTC
- Class: C1
- ERP: 36,180 watts
- HAAT: 449 metres (1,473 ft)

Links
- Webcast: Listen live (via iHeartRadio)
- Website: www.virginradio.ca/toronto.html

CKFM-FM (99.9 MHz, "99.9 Virgin Radio" ) is a commercial radio station in Toronto, Ontario. CKFM is owned by Bell Media and broadcasts a contemporary hit radio format.

CKFM's studios are located at 250 Richmond Street West in the Entertainment District, while its transmitter is located at the top of the CN Tower.

CKFM can be heard as far north as Gravenhurst, as far south as Ellicottville, New York, as far west as Woodstock, and as far east as Trenton.

== History ==
=== Early years ===
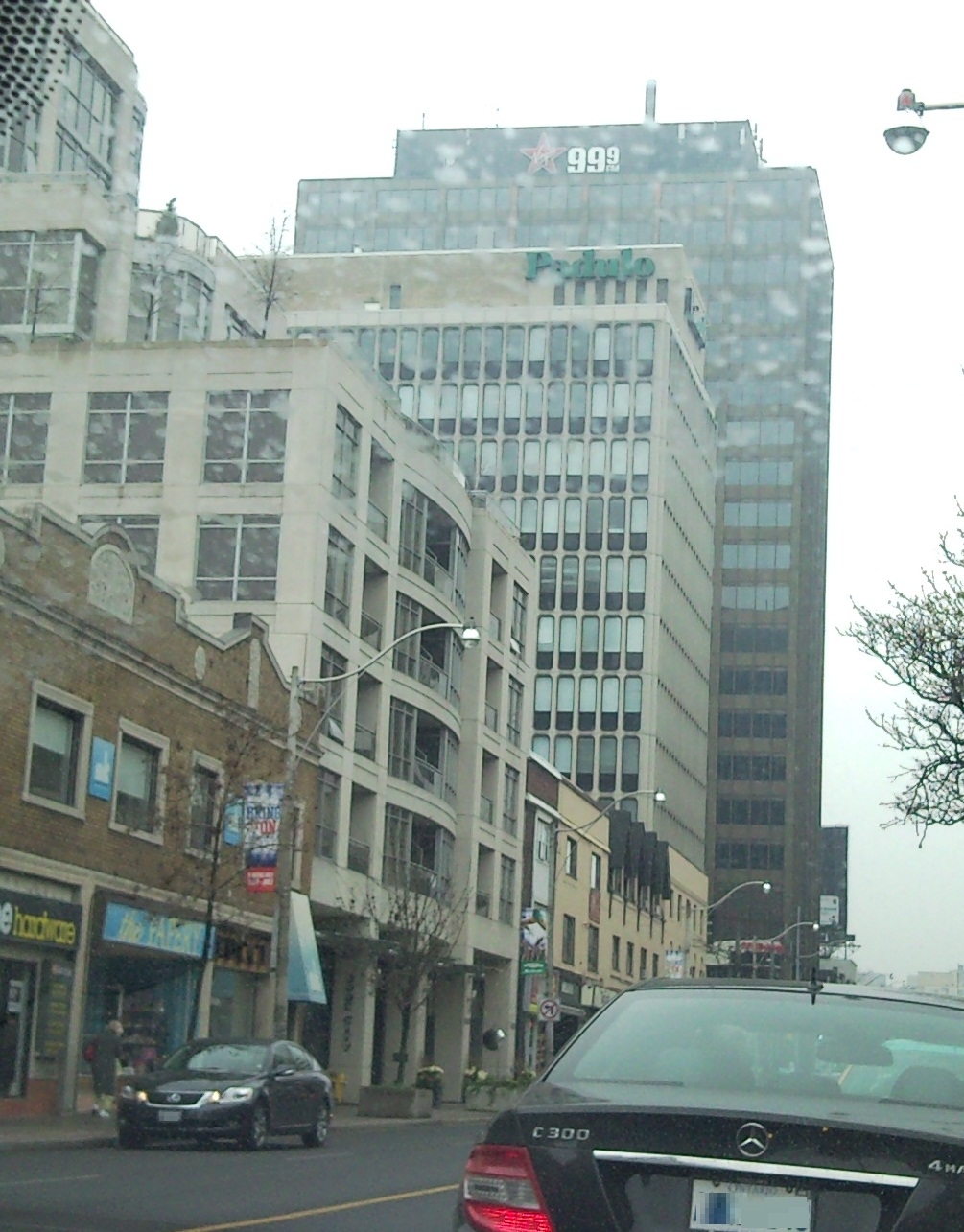
CKFM's former studios at 2 St. Clair West until May 2014, when CKFM moved to Bell Media's 250 Richmond Street West, adjacent to 299 Queen Street West

The station was launched in 1938, by the Rogers Radio Broadcasting Co. Ltd. (operated by Ted Rogers Sr., the father of the founder of Rogers Communications, as experimental FM station VE9AK. The station went off the air between 1942 and 1945, due to the war. It began broadcasting at 99.9 FM in 1947, as CFRB-FM, a simulcast of CFRB. Rogers Radio Broadcasting eventually became known as Standard Broadcasting, which was acquired by Argus Corporation in 1948.

In April 1961, the complete simulcast was dropped, in favour of some unique programming.

In April 1963, the station changed its call letters to CKFM-FM. All CFRB programming was discontinued. The station adopted an easy listening and MOR format, which lasted for many years and was very successful in ratings (a 1974 Billboard magazine article claimed the station had the most listeners in the 25-to-34-year-old age group of any Canadian radio station, AM or FM). During this time period, CKFM carried a few specialty shows, including a Sunday evening reggae program. Towards the latter part of the 1980s, CKFM transitioned towards a more younger-targeting adult contemporary format.

=== Mix/Mix FM (1991–2008) ===
Mix 99.9 logo, used from 1992 to 2006.

The station adopted the brand name Mix 99.9, on September 2, 1991, and adopted a hot adult contemporary format to compete with CHUM-FM. The first song on "Mix" was "Changes" by David Bowie. The brand name was changed slightly to 99.9 Mix FM on August 8, 2006, and the branding was phased in throughout the day. This coincided with the return of former Kiss 92 and CHFI-FM morning show hosts Mad Dog and Billie to Toronto radio.

A Canadian Radio-television and Telecommunications Commission (CRTC) decision from May 31, 2007, stated that the station's call sign was changed to CFMX-FM. Within weeks, the station reverted to CKFM-FM, due to both potential confusion with CFMZ-FM as that station, licensed to Cobourg but also heard in Toronto because of a rebroadcaster, was previously known as CFMX-FM; and because as of November 14, 2007, according to Industry Canada databases, the Toronto rebroadcaster of CFMZ was actually still known as CFMX-FM-1 (not CFMZ-FM-1).

On October 28, 2007, CKFM was purchased by Astral Media as part of its purchase of Standard Broadcasting. Since its purchase by Astral, the hot adult contemporary format went in a more rhythmic-leaning direction, patterned after sister stations CJFM-FM in Montreal and CKZZ-FM in Vancouver, which both carried rhythmic-leaning hot AC formats. It also began airing the American Top 40, which usually airs on Top 40/CHR stations across the U.S. and Canada.

=== Virgin Radio (2008–present) ===
Former "Virgin" logo (2008–2019)

Astral announced a partnership with the Virgin Group to rebrand the station 99.9 Virgin Radio (pronounced, "nine-nine-nine Virgin Radio") on August 25, 2008, taking effect at 4 pm that day. The final song on "Mix" was Green Day's "Good Riddance (Time of Your Life)", while the first song on "Virgin" was Madonna's "Like a Virgin". The change came just before the original British Virgin station was slated to lose its licence to the "Virgin" name and rebrand as Absolute Radio.

Astral officials indicated at the time that, if the rebranding was successful, the "Virgin" brand would eventually be rolled out to other markets nationwide. Barely three months later, on December 4, Astral deemed the new brand a success, and announced that stations in Montreal, Ottawa, and Vancouver will be rebranded as "Virgin" stations effective early January 2009. All three stations will retain essentially the same formats (rock at the Ottawa station, hot AC in Montreal and Vancouver). In addition to the aforementioned three stations, the "Virgin" branding has since been expanded to Calgary, Edmonton, London, Winnipeg, Kitchener, Halifax, Victoria, Kelowna and Windsor.

By September 2009, CKFM shifted to a Top 40/CHR format.

In June 2010, CKFM slightly changed its branding 99.9 Virgin Radio (pronounced, "ninety-nine-nine Virgin Radio"). A week after the change, the station held a contest called "Say it & Win!", where the 99th caller gets 10 seconds to say their new branding, "ninety-nine-nine Virgin Radio" for as many times as they can. For each time the contestant read out their new name, $100 would be given to them.

On June 27, 2013, Bell Media completed its acquisition of Astral Media, making CKFM a sister station to sports talk-formatted CHUM and hot AC-formatted CHUM-FM. Due to CRTC ownership limits, Bell and Astral's fellow FM stations CFXJ-FM and CHBM-FM were sold to Newcap Radio (now as Stingray Radio).

==== Morning show ====
When the station rebranded as "Virgin", mornings were hosted by Mad Dog and Billie. In July 2011, Billie was let go from the station, with midday host Maura being moved to mornings. In March 2015, Mad Dog was let go, with Scott Tucker from sister station CIQM succeeding him in mornings. In November 2018, Tucker and Maura were let go from the station. Shortly after, Bell announced that former "Virgin" host Adam Wylde and afternoon host TJ would host mornings beginning January 1. A few weeks later, Jax Irwin, formerly of CKIS, would join as a co-host.

In June 2023, Wylde and Irwin announced they would both leave the station. After a temporary morning show hosted by Chris Kelly and Deepa Prashad, Bell announced that Daryn Jones would join the station for mornings, alongside Prashad, in December.

== HD Radio ==
On July 4, 2017, CKFM launched HD Radio multi-casting services. The HD1 sub-channel carries the same programming as the standard analog frequency. As of mid-2018, the HD2 sub-channel carries a simulcast of sister station CFRB, the HD3 sub-channel carries a simulcast of CHUM, and the HD4 channel formerly carried a country format branded as Pure Country.

== Controversies ==
After Virgin posters featuring a kitchen radio poised at the edge of a TTC subway platform with the caption "give your radio a reason to live," had appeared in Toronto, Toronto Public Space Committee criticized poster ad was "in poor taste". The city's transportation department later ordered the removal of the posters. According to TTC chair Adam Giambrone, the TTC had allowed the photo for the poster to be taken at a subway station based on a request to photograph various radios on TTC platforms. Although a supervisor was on site, there was no indication on how the photos would be used in the ad.
