= CKVR-DT =

Television station in Barrie

- Barrie–Toronto, Ontario; Canada
- City: Barrie, Ontario
- Channels: Digital: 9 (VHF); Virtual: 3
- Branding: CTV2 Barrie or CTV2 (general); CTV News Barrie (newscasts)

Programming
- Affiliations: 3.1: CTV2

Ownership
- Owner: Bell Media Inc.
- Sister stations: TV: CFTO-DT, CP24; Radio: CFRB, CHUM, CHUM-FM, CKFM-FM

History
- First air date: September 28, 1955
- Former call signs: CKVR-TV (1955–2011)
- Former channel numbers: Analog: 3 (VHF, 1955–2011); Digital: 10 (VHF, 2011–2020)
- Former affiliations: CBC (1955–1995); NTA Film Network (secondary, 1956–1961); Independent (1995–1998)
- Call sign meaning: Valerie and Ralph Snelgrove

Technical information
- Licensing authority: CRTC
- ERP: 11 kW
- HAAT: 339 m (1,112 ft)
- Transmitter coordinates: 44°21′0″N 79°41′50″W
- Translator(s): see § Transmitters

Links
- Website: CTV2 Barrie

CKVR-DT (channel 3) is a television station in Barrie, Ontario, Canada, serving as the flagship station of the CTV2 system. It is owned and operated by Bell Media alongside Toronto-based CTV flagship CFTO-DT, channel 9 (although the two stations maintain separate operations); it is also sister to 24-hour regional news channel CP24. CKVR-DT's studios and transmitter are co-located at 33 Beacon Road in Barrie.

The station was founded by Ralph Snelgrove on September 28, 1955; Barrie was the smallest community in North America to have its own television station. CKVR was a longtime CBC affiliate, having been so for forty years from its inception. CHUM Limited acquired the station in 1969, becoming one of the first privately owned stations by the company. The station ended its affiliation with the CBC in 1995 and the station was rebranded as The New VR. During its short time as an independent station, CKVR's heavy intense news and other locally produced programming were modeled after its longstanding Citytv station in Toronto. CHUM later used CKVR-TV as the basis and flagship station of a television system, acquiring and establishing new stations under the NewNet name, which became more conventional after CHUM acquired the assets of Craig Media in 2004 while CKVR and the rest of the NewNet system was relaunched as A-Channel in 2005.

In July 2006, CTVglobemedia (then known as Bell Globemedia) announced its intent to acquire CHUM Limited, but was required to divest the Citytv stations due to conflicts with CTV stations it already owned in the same markets. CTV chose to keep the A-Channel stations including CKVR, as well as CKVR-TV's sister news channel CP24 and its other cable channels MuchMusic, but divested CITY-TV and its sister stations to Rogers Media. CKVR was rebranded thrice to A in 2008, followed by CTV Two in 2011 and again as CTV2 in 2018 and since its eventual acquisition by Bell, CKVR's programming became more conventional in nature.

== CBC Television affiliate ==
=== Early history ===
CKVR's final logo as a CBC affiliate from 1989 to 1995.

Ralph Snelgrove, the owner of CKBB (now known as CIQB-FM) was awarded a television license in 1954 by the CBC Board of Governors to operate in Barrie. The station first signed on the air on September 28, 1955, and the callsign was derived from Snelgrove whose first initial and that of his wife, Valerie, form part of the station's callsign though it was originally to be called CKBB-TV after a radio station. It originally operated as a privately owned affiliate of CBC Television.

In 1969, the station was purchased by CHUM Limited, becoming one of the first television stations owned by the company.

On September 7, 1977, a private aircraft, owned by Falconbridge Nickel Mines Ltd., dropped altitude to 500 feet (150 m) in dense fog and struck CKVR's 1,000-foot (300 m) transmitter tower, killing all five people aboard the plane and destroying the tower and antenna. The station's 225-foot (69 m) auxiliary tower was also destroyed and there was some damage to the main studio building. The tower also supported the antennae for CHAY-FM (93.1 FM) and a rebroadcaster (on UHF channel 55) of Radio-Canada station CBLFT (channel 25) in Toronto, the studio/transmitter link of CKBB (950 AM, now on 101.1 FM), as well as paging and other communications systems. The CKVR antenna was an RCA six-bay turnstile. On the following morning, the CBC secured the use of a 400 feet (120 m) tower for CKVR. The first sections of the new temporary tower were lifted into place on September 10. On September 19, CKVR's antenna was hoisted into place on the new tower, along with those for CBLFT and CHAY-FM, with the transmission line also being put in place. After work on the tower was completed, tests were made to the transmitter's signal. At 8:35 p.m. that evening, the transmitter was turned on with a colour bar test pattern being broadcast. At 8:55 p.m., CKVR vice president and general manager Jack Mattenley went on the air in a live broadcast with a message of sympathy and words of gratitude to viewers. CKVR returned to the air at a reduced power of 40,000 watts until a new 1,000-foot (300 m) tower was built in 1978.

=== 1985 Barrie tornado ===
On May 31, 1985, an F4 tornado, one of the most powerful and devastating tornadoes in Canadian history, struck Barrie, just a short distance from CKVR's studio facility and transmitter tower (the twister was among several other ones that were spawned during a massive tornado outbreak that affected parts of Eastern Canada and the Eastern United States), killing 12 people, injuring 600 people and destroying many homes and businesses in Barrie. CKVR broadcast extensive coverage of the storm's aftermath for several days, and spent that summer helping the people of Barrie recover and rebuild. The station also held a day-long telethon in June of that year to raise funds for the tornado victims.

=== Programming changes ===
Once the CN Tower in Toronto was completed in 1976, atop which CBC flagship CBLT (channel 5) transmits from, the signal coverage areas of CKVR and CBLT overlapped considerably. CKVR management began to consider a different course for the station that took several years to become realized. By the late 1980s, programming outside of CBC and local news was mostly classic reruns such as I Love Lucy, Star Trek, The Addams Family and others, to the point where the station was often branded as CKVR Classic Television. Thanks to the acquisition of Toronto's CITY-TV by CHUM in 1979, CKVR was (technically) part of a twinstick, and Citytv programming began to air in limited timeslots.

== The New VR and A-Channel ==
Logo used while as The New VR, used from 1995 to 2005.

Eventually, the station's financial situation became untenable; then-general manager Doug Garraway explained in a presentation to the CRTC in spring 1994, "the CBC no longer wants us, in point of fact we can no longer afford to remain affiliated with them." CKVR was expected to have lost $5 million by the end of 1995. As a result, the station made the decision to drop CBC programming and go in a new direction.

On September 1, 1995, CKVR ended its affiliation with the CBC and converted into an independent station as "The New VR", and began targeting its programming towards younger viewers. As part of the relaunch, newscasts were overhauled to be similar in format to Toronto sister station CITY-TV, classic shows were dropped in favour of newer programs (including, among others, the syndicated Action Pack block, the short-lived newsmagazine Day and Date, and encore presentations of Citytv's original productions, like CityLine and MovieTelevision; cross-promotion between both stations also commenced), and the station became an official broadcaster of the Toronto Raptors NBA franchise (sharing coverage with Citytv). Over $1 million was invested into new equipment for the station.

The new direction was successful—as CHUM Limited began replicating CKVR's format on its other stations, including several that it had acquired from Baton Broadcasting in 1997 (including CHRO-TV in Pembroke, CHWI-TV in Wheatley, CFPL-TV in London and CKNX-TV in Wingham), which formed the basis for a television system originally known as NewNet. At various times during the late 1990s and early 2000s, CKVR also broadcast mid-week games from the Raptors, as well as games from the NHL's Toronto Maple Leafs. The Maple Leafs and Raptors games were carried on all of NewNet's stations across Ontario with the exception of CHRO-TV, which did not carry Maple Leafs games due to the fact that CHRO is in the home market of the Ottawa Senators. CKVR also broadcast WWF Monday Night Raw for a time in the late 1990s as well.

In the early 2000s, plans were being created for CKVR to move from their original facility to a new, state-of-the-art broadcast centre in Barrie's historic Allandale Station, much as other CHUM properties had street-side studios located in city centres. CHUM purchased the 6.9 acres (2.8 ha) of land, including the station buildings, for C$1,050,000 in 2000. CHUM planned to restore the Allandale Station building as part of their plan, but changed their plan in 2004. In 2007, CHUM agreed to sell the property to the City for the same amount CHUM originally paid. CHUM received a Charitable Donation tax receipt reflecting the increased value of the property since 2000 largely due to the restoration and site works completed by CHUM.

Logo used while as A-Channel, used from 2005 to 2008.

In February 2005, CHUM announced plans to consolidate the master control departments for CKVR, CFPL, CHRO, CHWI and CKNX at 299 Queen Street West in Toronto (which housed most of CHUM's television services including MuchMusic and CP24 and had also housed the operations for Toronto television station, CITY-TV at the time), and to consolidate the traffic and programming departments of the other stations at CFPL's facilities in London, resulting in the loss of approximately nine staff members from CKVR. Those operations were migrated to the Toronto facilities on June 3, 2005.

After CHUM's acquisition of Craig Media, its A-Channel stations in Western Canada were converted to owned-and-operated stations of the Citytv system on August 2, 2005. On the same day, the previous brand was transferred to the NewNet stations, resulting in CKVR rebranding under the A-Channel name.

== Bell ownership ==
On July 12, 2006, CTV owner Bell Globemedia (the latter which renamed it to CTVglobemedia in January 2007) announced plans to purchase CHUM Limited for C$1.7 billion, with plans to divest itself of the A-Channel stations and the Access Alberta educational-commercial stations and cable channel. That same day, CHUM laid off over 281 employees and CKVR was mostly not affected, which CHUM intends to return the station to its local focus.

Logo used while as A Barrie, used from 2008 to 2011.

On April 9, 2007, it was announced that Rogers Communications would acquire the A-Channel network of stations (including CKVR), along with several other CHUM's speciality channels from CTVglobemedia as part of its pending take over CHUM Limited. The Canadian Radio-television and Telecommunications Commission (CRTC) said it would only approve CTVglobemedia's purchase of CHUM if it sold off the latter company's Citytv stations instead, while being permitted to keep the A-Channel stations (including CKVR). CTVglobemedia took control of the A-Channel stations and the rest of CHUM Limited's assets (excluding the Citytv network of stations, which were sold to Rogers Communications) on June 22, 2007. Richard Gray was named head of news for the A-Channel stations and CKX-TV in Brandon, Manitoba (another station that was included in the CHUM acquisition). Gray reported directly to the CTVgm corporate group instead of CTV News to preserve autonomy in news presentation and management. Gray began to oversee CKVR and the other news departments; CHRO, CFPL, CKX-TV, CKNX-TV, CHWI and CIVI in Victoria, British Columbia. On August 11, 2008, the A-Channel system (and the Atlantic Satellite Network, an independent cable channel in Atlantic Canada which Baton/CTV had acquired from CHUM in 1997) were rebranded as "A".

Logo used from 2011 to 2018

On September 10, 2010, Bell Canada announced plans to re-acquire 100% of CTVglobemedia, a deal which was approved by the CRTC on March 7, 2011; the deal was finalized on April 1, 2011, with CTVglobemedia being absorbed into Bell Media.

On May 30, 2011, Bell Media announced that the A system would be relaunched as CTV Two effective on August 29, 2011. Along with the relaunch came the rebranding of CKVR's newscasts as CTV News (a brand that was already used for the newscasts on CTV's owned-and-operated stations, including network flagship CFTO in nearby Toronto), and the implementation of an anchor desk for its newscasts as well as the addition of a high definition feed on its new digital signal.

== News operation ==
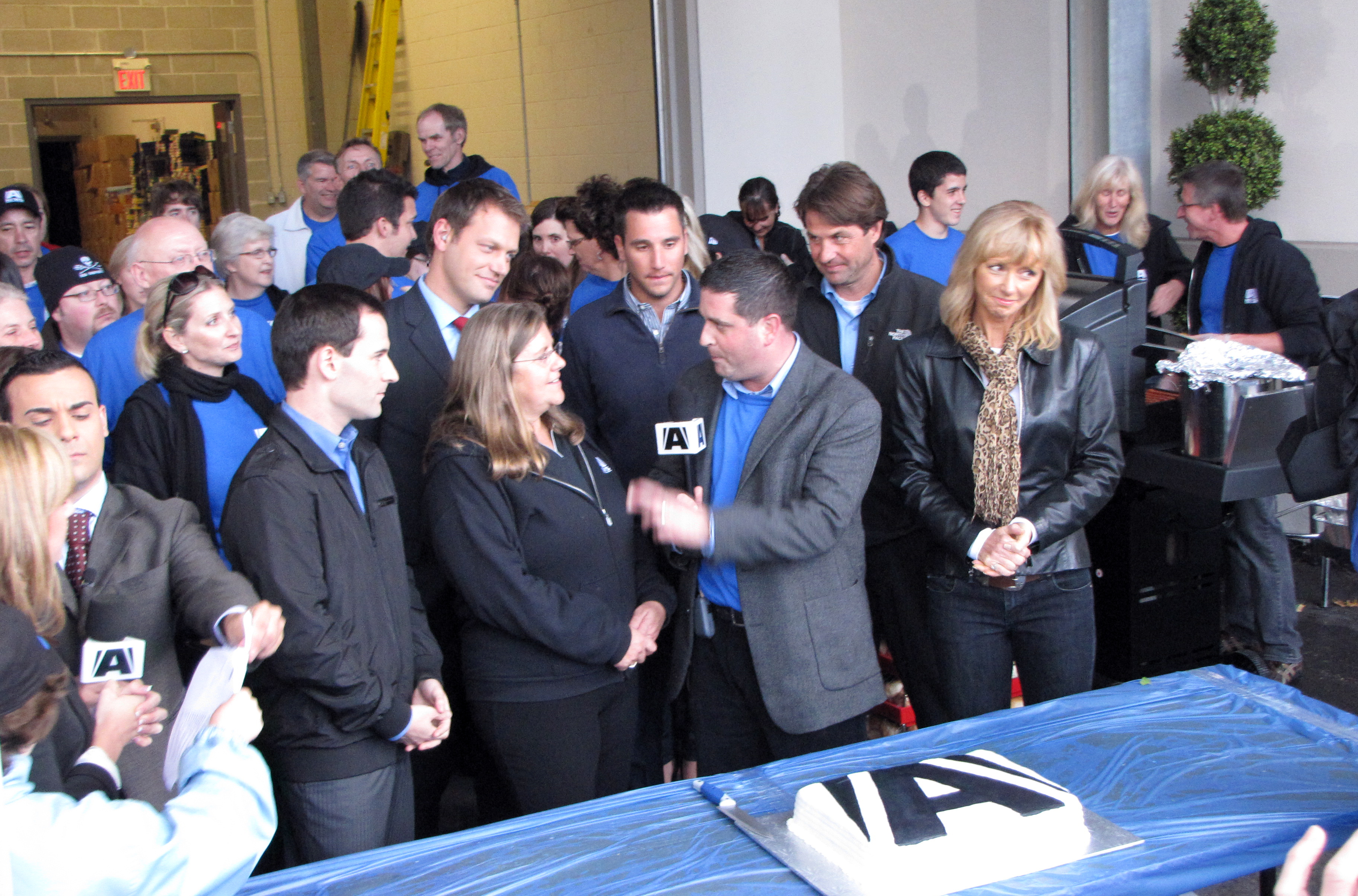
Various staff of CKVR at a 2010 open house. Front row from left: Mike Arsalides (holding paper), Tony Grace, former station manager Peggy Hebden, Rob Cooper, Jayne Pritchard.

CKVR-DT presently broadcasts 9 1/2 hours of locally produced newscasts each week (with one hour-long show each weekday at 6 p.m., and half-hour shows at 11 p.m. on weekdays, and at 6 p.m. and 11 p.m. on Saturdays and Sundays); in regards to the number of hours devoted to news programming, it is the lowest local newscast output out of any English-language television station in the Toronto market as a whole (of the English stations serving the immediate Toronto area, CBC O&O CBLT-DT produces the lowest newscast output with 11 hours each week). In addition to CKVR's news centre in Barrie, CKVR-DT also operates news bureaus in Collingwood and Muskoka. The station's newscasts are branded CTV News Barrie in line with other CTV and CTV2 owned-and-operated stations which also use similar branding. The station currently produces a one-hour local news programs weeknights at 6 p.m., and half-hour programs nightly at 11 p.m., and on weekends at 6 p.m.

During the station's CBC years, their newscasts were branded as CKVR Total News and featured a conventional newscast format. One young reporter, Kevin Frankish, reported for the station on the 1985 tornado, and eventually was promoted to CITY-TV's news operation.

When the station was relaunched in 1995, their newscast underwent a similar overhaul. The station's news now took after CITY-TV's groundbreaking CityPulse, including an open newsroom set where anchors and reporters stood up to present the news. The focus of the newscast was also broadened to include more of the communities around Barrie, resulting in the newscast being dubbed VRLand News, "VRLand" being an all-encompassing term for the station's coverage area. By 1999, the newscast had been renamed to simply VR News.

During the station's latter years under CHUM ownership, CKVR simulcast the flagship Toronto edition of CITY-TV's morning program Breakfast Television, with local news inserts incorporated that focused on stories within the Barrie area. In 2008, CKVR debuted a three-hour weekday morning news program titled A Morning, which was anchored by K.C. Colby (now weather specialist for the station's weekday evening newscasts) and Jennifer Buchanan.

Due to financial difficulties, CTVglobemedia cancelled A Morning, and the public affairs programs A News This Week (a pre-recorded wrap of the week's top stories, which debuted in the 1990s) and Ontario News This Week (a review of the week's top stories across the province, which also debuted in 2008) on March 4, 2009, laying off 24 employees at the station as part of a larger series of cutbacks and massive layoffs which resulted in the losses of 118 jobs at A's stations across Canada. The morning program was replaced by rebroadcasts of CKVR's 11 p.m. newscast.

Evening co-anchor Lance Chilton resigned from the station on June 14, 2010, to work in the real estate industry. In August 2010, Tony Grace, who had served as anchor and national reporter for Ottawa sister station CHRO, was named the new Senior News Anchor for CKVR effective September 20, 2010.

In September and October 2015, the station celebrated its 60th anniversary with a special five part news series of in-depth feature reports on the station's history. The week culminated with a live broadcast of CTV News at 6 on October 2, 2015, from the Barrie waterfront, featuring staff and on-air personalities past and present. The anniversary series examining the station's history was also rebroadcast as a half-hour special hosted by Tony Grace on December 28, 2015.

== Technical information ==
=== Subchannel ===
Subchannel of CKVR-DT
Subchannel	Res.	Short name	Programming
3.1	1080i	CKVR	CTV2

=== Analog-to-digital conversion ===
CKVR shut down its analog signal, over VHF channel 3, on August 31, 2011, the official date on which Canadian television stations in CRTC-designated mandatory markets transitioned from analog to digital broadcasts. The station flash cut its digital signal into operation, broadcasting on channel 10, using virtual channel 3.

=== Transmitters ===
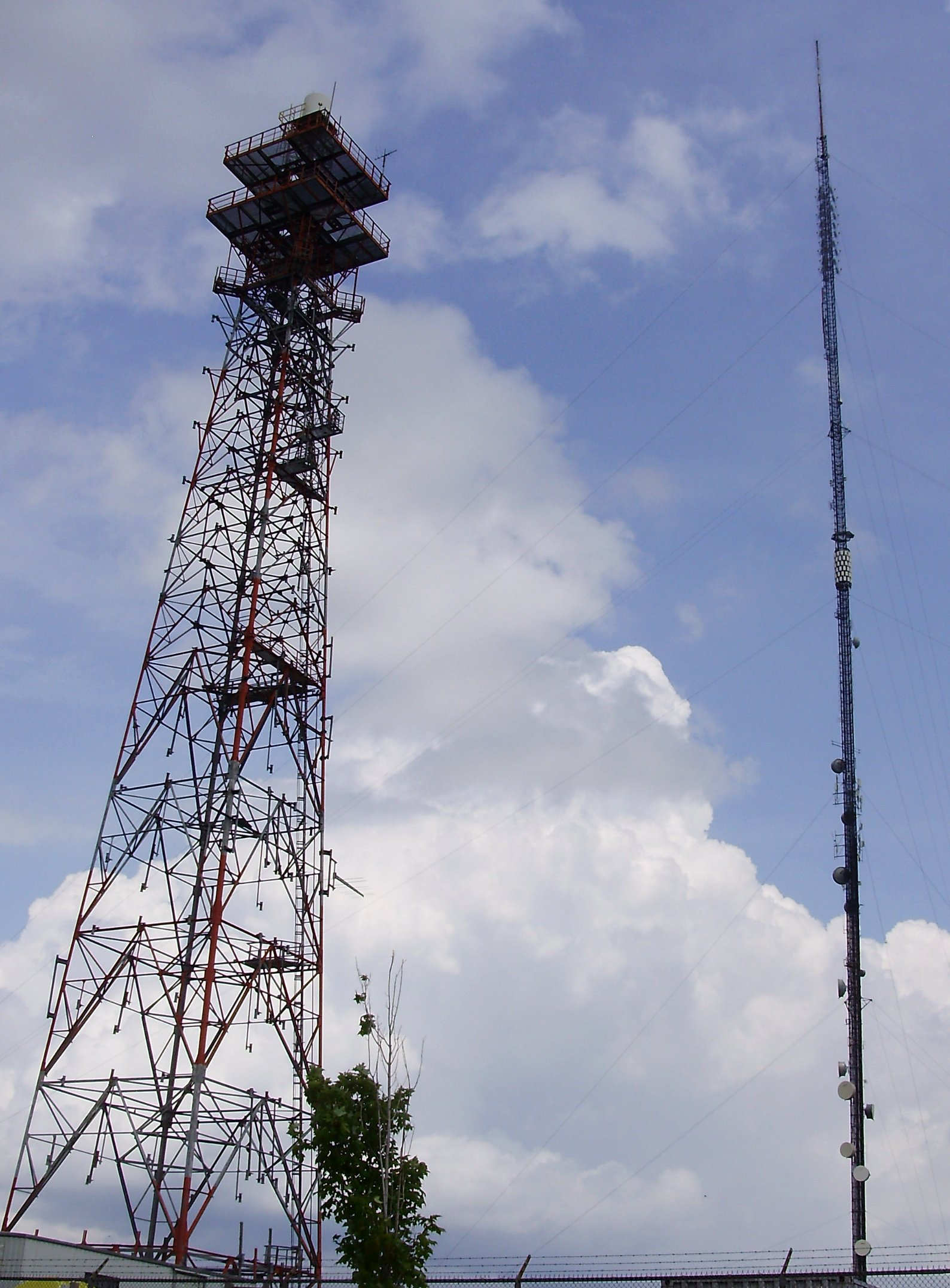
The CKVR Television Tower is a landmark visible throughout much of the city of Barrie.

The current CKVR Television Tower is a 304.8-metre (1,000 ft) high guyed mast for FM and television signal transmission located at 44°21′00″N 79°41′50″W in Barrie. It was built in 1978, after a light plane crashed into the smaller incarnation of the tower the previous year.

CKVR previously operated low-power rebroadcast transmitters in the communities of Parry Sound, Huntsville and Haliburton, respectively on VHF channels 11, 8 and 5. The Parry Sound transmitter moved to VHF channel 12 in the mid-1970s before Kitchener CTV station CKCO-TV (channel 13) opened a rebroadcast transmitter in Huntsville on channel 11. The Haliburton transmitter was located very close to another CBC affiliate transmitter, CHEX-TV in Peterborough, located at Minden and broadcasting on channel 7. The channel 5 transmitter was shut down when Toronto's CBLT moved from channel 6 to channel 5, and became largely redundant as a result of CKVR's increased transmission tower height in the early 1970s. The Huntsville transmitter increased to full power in 1991 to better cover much of Muskoka and Haliburton County; it was bought by the CBC in 1995 as part of CKVR's disaffiliation from the CBC, and became a rebroadcaster of CBLT (remaining in operation until CBC shut down its analog rebroadcasters in July 2012). CKVR kept its Parry Sound transmitter, and CBC established CBLT transmitters in Barrie and Parry Sound at that time, on channels 16 and 18, respectively.

On May 30, 2011, Bell Media announced plans to add a rebroadcast transmitter in Southern Ontario in 2012, to allow new advertising opportunities in the Toronto–Hamilton market. An application was filed with the CRTC and Industry Canada on June 17, 2011, to allow for a digital repeater (CKVP-DT) on UHF channel 42 in Fonthill, serving Niagara Falls, Fort Erie and St. Catharines, and a repeater (CHCJ-DT) on UHF channel 35 on CHCH-DT's tower, serving Hamilton, Oakville, Haldimand County, Caledonia, Brantford, Milton and Cambridge. This application was approved on January 26, 2012. On May 17, 2012, Bell Media had announced to the CRTC that it was unable to negotiate a lease with Channel Zero, owners of CHCH (and its broadcast tower). It requested and received permission to test its signal on one of its own towers, the Bell microwave tower located on Upper Wentworth Street at Fennell Avenue, for a period of one year. In addition to this technical amendment, the station's Hamilton transmitter is to be fed by fibre optic connection, instead of being satellite-fed, rendering it less susceptible to interference during thunderstorms. On July 8, 2013, Bell Media applied for a substantial increase in power for CHCJ-DT, from 5 kW to 150 kW average (390 kW maximum) with a slight decrease in height to 110 meters. This was approved on January 15, 2014, despite an objection from Rogers Media, with the addition of the site on Upper Wentworth Street as its permanent transmitter site (to compensate for the loss of CHCH-DT's tower space).

Station	City of licence	Channel (RF / VC)	ERP	HAAT	Transmitter coordinates
CKVR-TV-1	Parry Sound	12 (VHF)	0.007 kW	0.00 m (0 ft)	45°20′38″N 80°0′46″W
CHCJ-DT	Hamilton	35 (UHF); 35.1	390 kW	110 m (361 ft)	43°13′52.64″N 79°51′32.63″W
CKVP-DT	Fonthill	29 (UHF); 42.1	3.85 kW	151 m (495 ft)	43°3′5″N 79°18′1″W

On February 11, 2016, Bell Media applied for its regular license renewals, which included applications to delete a long list of transmitters, including CKVR-TV-1. Bell Media's rationale for deleting these analog repeaters is below:

"We are electing to delete these analog transmitters from the main licence with which they are associated. These analog transmitters generate no incremental revenue, attract little to no viewership given the growth of BDU or DTH subscriptions and are costly to maintain, repair or replace. In addition, none of the highlighted transmitters offer any programming that differs from the main channels. The Commission has determined that broadcasters may elect to shut down transmitters but will lose certain regulatory privileges (distribution on the basic service, the ability to request simultaneous substitution) as noted in Broadcasting Regulatory Policy CRTC 2015–24, Over-the-air transmission of television signals and local programming. We are fully aware of the loss of these regulatory privileges as a result of any transmitter shutdown."

At the same time, Bell Media applied to convert the licenses of CTV Two Atlantic (formerly ASN) and CTV Two Alberta (formerly ACCESS) from satellite-to-cable undertakings into television stations without transmitters (similar to cable-only network affiliates in the United States), and to reduce the level of educational content on CTV Two Alberta.
