= 250 Richmond Street West =

Broadcasting complex in Toronto, Canada

Coordinates: 43.6496°N 79.3894°W

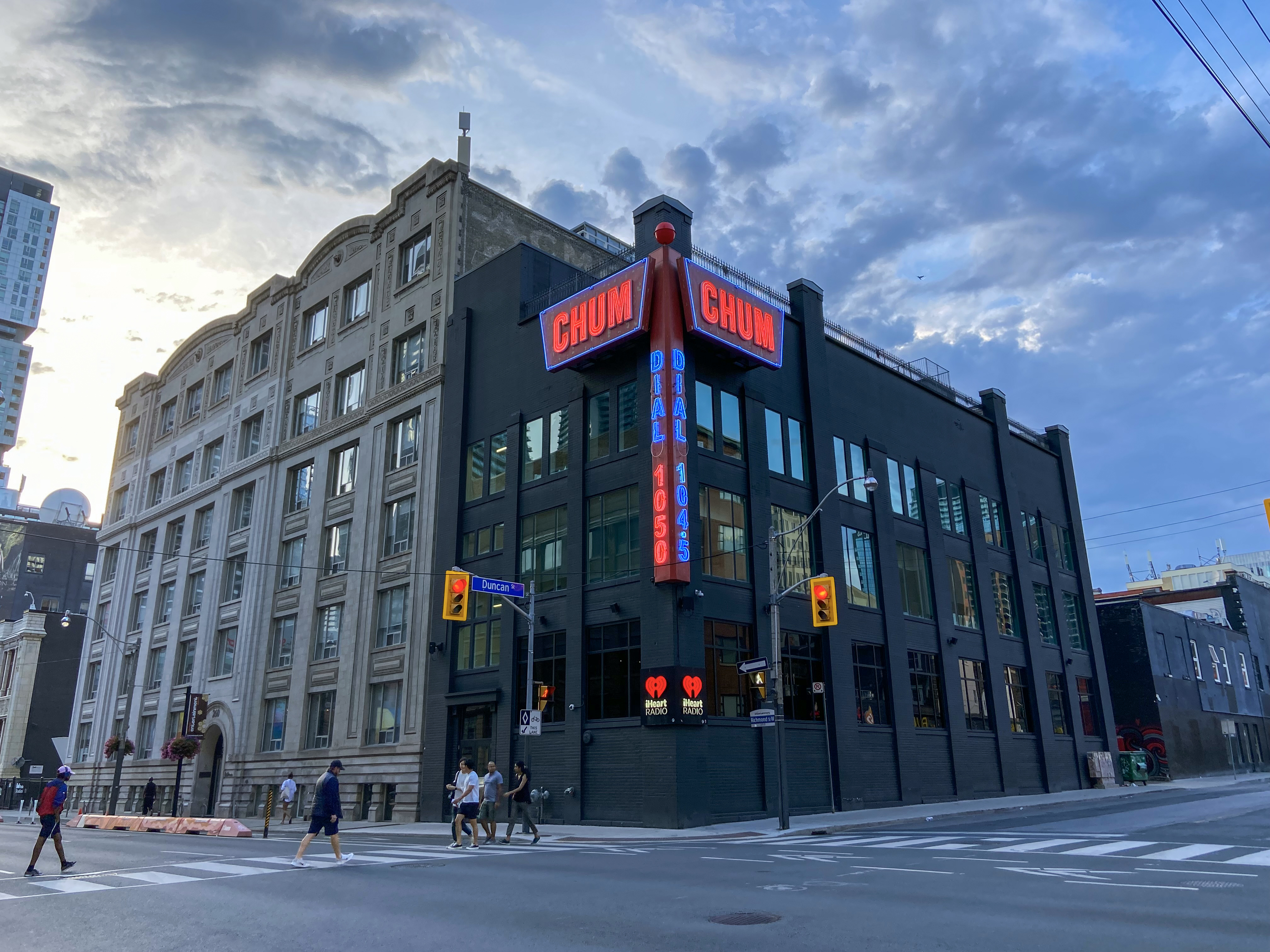
- The CHUM neon sign at 250 Richmond Street West

General information
- Type: Commercial office
- Location: Toronto, Ontario, Canada, 250 Richmond Street West
- Opened: 1924
- Owner: Bell Media

Technical details
- Floor count: 4

Ontario Heritage Act
- Designated: October 22, 2024

250 Richmond Street West is a studio complex in Downtown Toronto, Ontario, Canada. The building now serves as the headquarters of iHeartRadio Canada's national radio operations of Bell Media, and as the studios of the company's Toronto radio stations, CHUM-FM (CHUM 104.5), CFRB (Newstalk 1010) and CKFM-FM (99.9 Virgin Radio).

The building previously served as the home of the Go Gos, Whiskey Saigon and Joe nightclubs.

The building is located at the corner of Richmond and Duncan Streets and is connected with 299 Queen Street West via offices at 260 Richmond Street West (former Tip Top Tailors warehouse, c 1914). The building is likely part of the 1924 addition to 260 Richmond. This complex is where Bell Media's speciality television channels such as the television operations of Much as well as BNN, CTV Drama Channel, E! and CTV Sci-Fi Channel are based as well as select CTV programming.

CHUM and CHUM-FM's previous headquarters were located at 1331 Yonge Street until CTV announced it would sell the building to developer Aspen Ridge Homes for $21.5 million in July 2008. CTV also announced it would move the CHUM neon sign to the new complex, the sign was unveiled at its new location on June 15, 2009, and the company's Toronto radio stations officially moved into the new complex on August 19, 2009.

The building also briefly served as home to rhythmic and classic hip hop station Flow 93.5 from February 2011 until after their sale to Newcap Radio on March 31, 2014. When Bell Canada acquired Astral Media they were required by the Competition Bureau to divest a number of certain assets. As a media company in Canada cannot own more than two FM and two AM English radio stations in any one market, Flow 93.5 was subsequently sold while NewsTalk 1010 and Virgin 99.9 were kept through the purchase of Astral. The studios for CFRB and CKFM-FM were previously located at 2 St. Clair Avenue at Yonge and St. Clair until these stations moved to the complex on May 10, 2014.

Until 2010, the building was also home to CHUM FM sister station, CHUM AM, both during its time as CP24 Radio 1050 and briefly in 2010 during the first few months operating as TSN 1050. Now, CHUM AM is primarily based at the 9 Channel Nine Court complex in the Agincourt neighbourhood of Scarborough, so its radio programs can be simulcast on TSN's television network.
