= 299 Queen Street West =

Headquarters of Bell Media in Toronto

Coordinates: 43.649833°N 79.390705°W

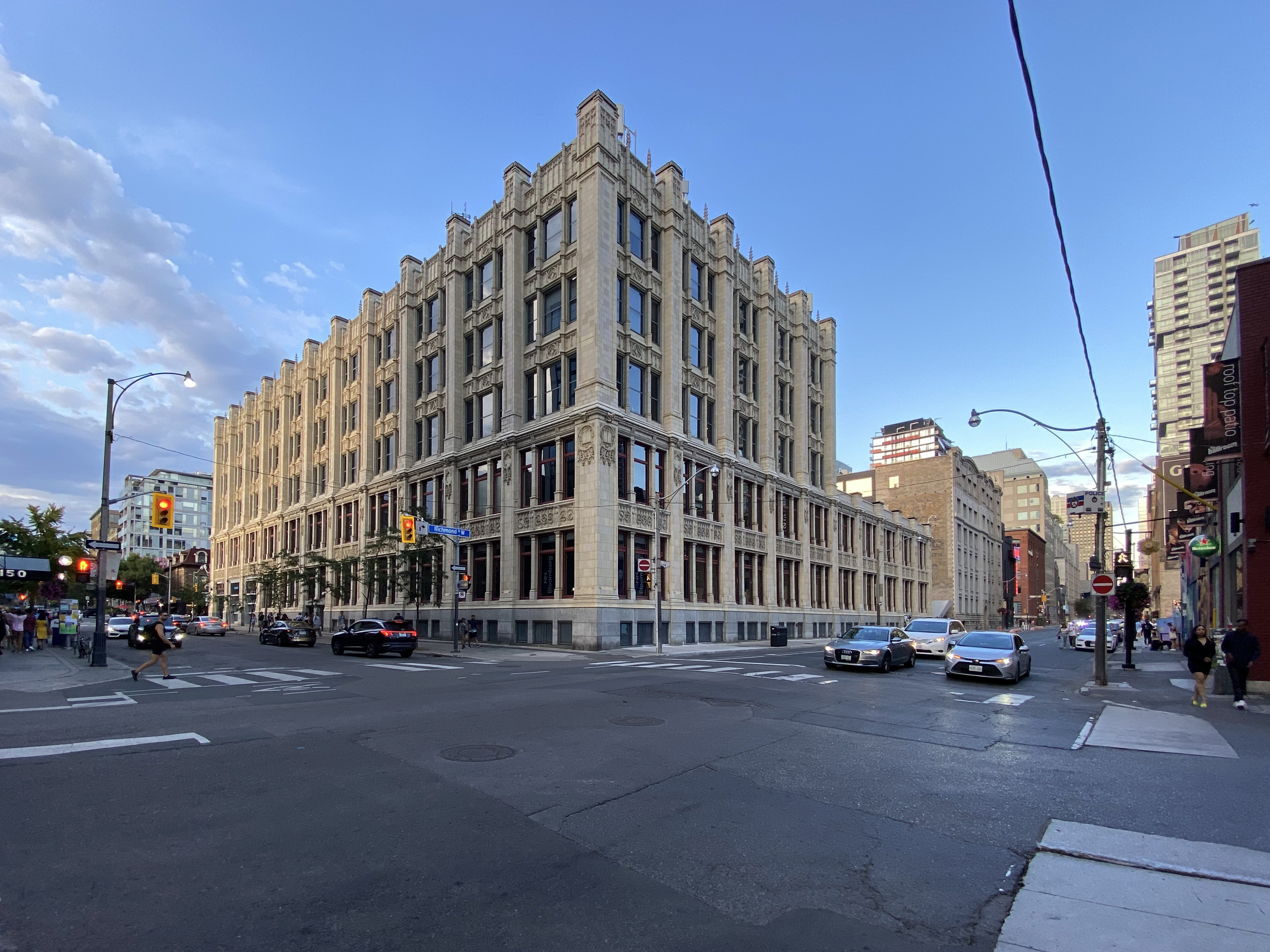
- 299 Queen Street West, photographed from the corner of Richmond and John streets in 2022
- Former names: CHUM-City Building
- Alternative names: MuchMusic World Headquarters; Bell Media Queen Street, Bell Media Studios

General information
- Architectural style: Gothic Revival
- Location: Toronto, Ontario, Canada, 299 Queen Street West
- Opened: 1913
- Owner: Bell Media

Ontario Heritage Act
- Designated: Aug 11, 1986

299 Queen Street West, also known as Bell Media Queen Street or Bell Media Studios, is the headquarters of the television/radio broadcast hub of Bell Canada's media unit, Bell Media, and is located at the intersection of Queen Street West and John Street in Downtown Toronto, Ontario, Canada. The building previously served as the headquarters of CTVglobemedia until Bell Canada acquired CTV again in 2011 as well as CHUM Television, a division of CHUM Limited, until CTV acquired CHUM in 2007, and was once known as the CHUM-City Building. It is now head offices and downtown Toronto studios for Bell Media.

With its 1913 neo-Gothic terra cotta façade, the building is designated as a heritage property by the City of Toronto's Heritage Preservation Services under the Ontario Heritage Act and has served as a broadcast facility since 1987.

== Overview ==
The building serves as the official headquarters of Bell Canada's media unit, Bell Media, as well as the home of various Bell Media television properties, most of which were originally owned by CHUM, although some properties that CTV already owned prior to 2007 have moved some or all of their operations here since then as well. Current occupants include CTV Drama Channel, BNN Bloomberg, CTV Comedy Channel, E!, Oxygen True Crime, CTV Life Channel, Much (formerly MuchMusic) and CTV Sci-Fi Channel. Selected CTV programs, including etalk and The Social are produced at the building and selected network offices are located in this facility.

Aside from the CTV network programming, Toronto station CFTO-TV has relatively little presence at the Queen Street facility. The primary studios for CTV Toronto, and the CTV network's national operations are located at 9 Channel Nine Court at Highway 401 and McCowan Road in Scarborough, where many of Bell Media's other co-owned channels such as CP24, CTV News Channel, USA Network, TSN, as well as the master controls for the CTV stations in Eastern Canada, are located (see below).

== History and architecture ==
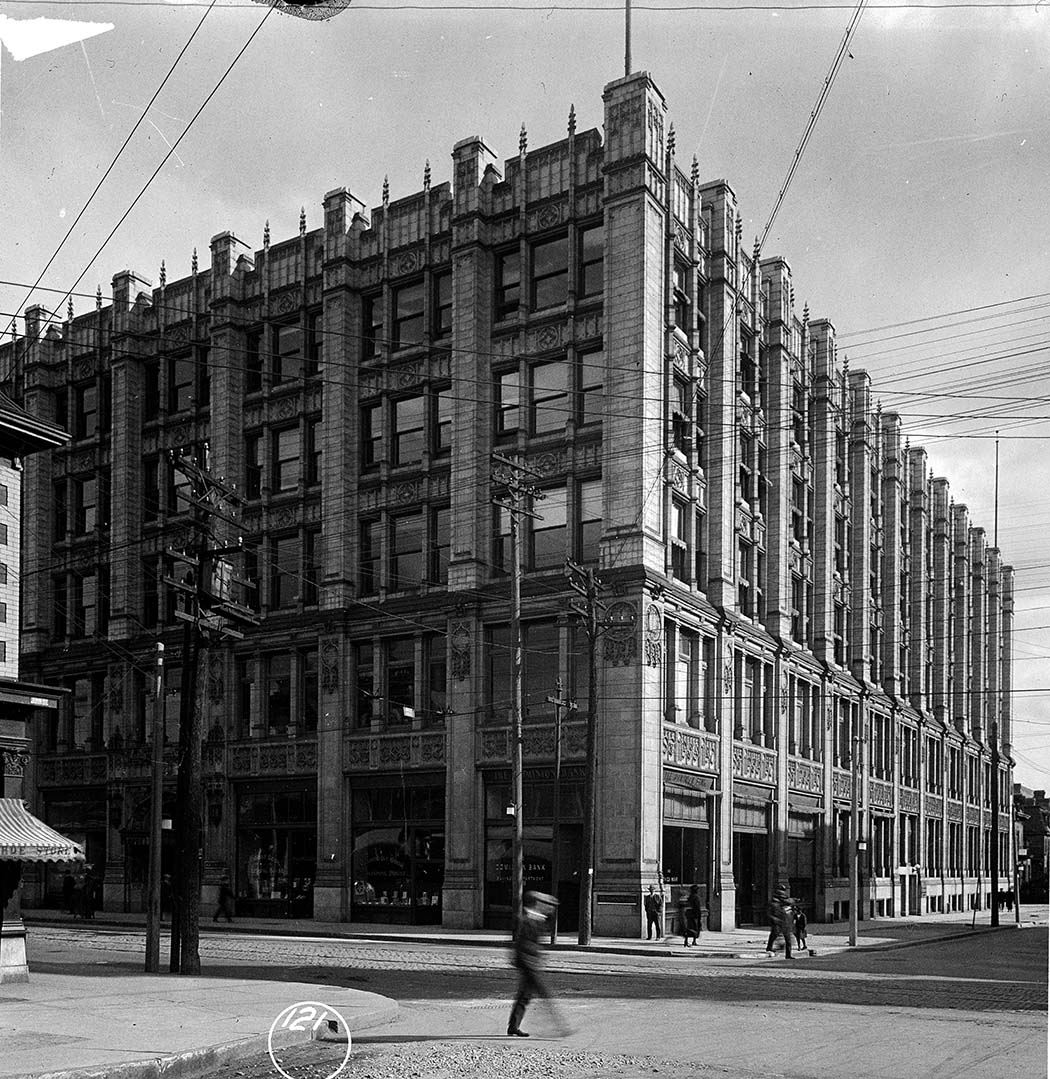
299 Queen Street West, then the headquarters of the Methodist Church, in 1919

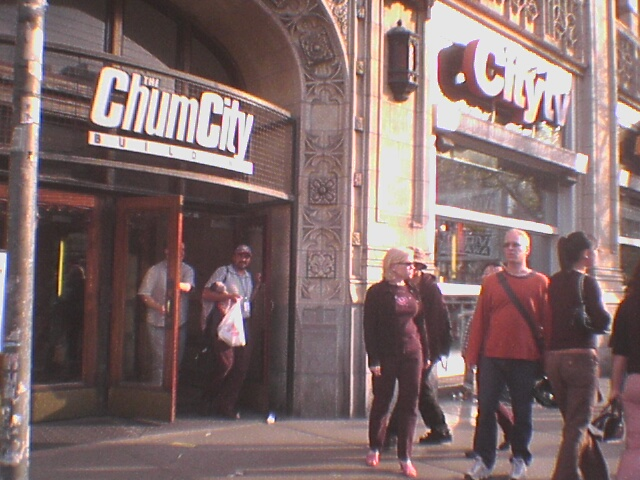
299 Queen Street West, then known as the CHUM-City Building, in 2004. The CHUM and Citytv signs were removed after CTV took control of CHUM.

The site where 299 Queen resides was once occupied by Beverley House, built on what was Lot 16 in 1812 for D’Arcy (Edward) Boulton Jr.(1785-1846), son of G. D'Arcy Boulton and named for brother in law Sir John Beverley Robinson, who served as Chief Justice of Upper Canada. The home was modified from the smaller original Boulton home to a larger home. While it served briefly as home to Charles Poulett Thomson, 1st Baron Sydenham as Governor General of the Province of Canada but remained owned Robinson family until 1910 when Elizabeth Street Robinson (widow of Christopher Robinson and son of Boulton Jr.) sold and was demolished after 1911.

The current five-storey building was originally constructed as the headquarters of the Methodist Church of Canada in 1913 by Burke, Horwood and White. The Methodists joined with two other denominations to form the United Church of Canada in 1925, for which the building served as the headquarters until 1959. By this time the Ryerson Press, originally the publishing arm of the Methodist Church, had grown to occupy the entire building.

=== CHUM Limited & CTVglobemedia ===
In 1979, family owned CHUM Limited (then solely a radio network) purchased the rest of Citytv to which it did not yet own, which prompted the building purchase by CHUM in 1985. Toronto architecture firm Quadrangle was hired to restore and renovate the building into an innovative broadcast hub. After two years of outfitting it for broadcast operations, it was re-opened in May 1987 as the new television headquarters for the company and its various outlets, including Citytv Toronto (which was previously located at 99 Queen St. East). CHUM Limited's overall corporate headquarters and its Toronto radio stations continued to be based at 1331 Yonge Street.

The building's east wall was decorated with an actual older style news truck seemingly bursting out of the building; the front tires of the truck can still be seen spinning regularly. From the time the truck was erected there, it originally bore the old "CityPulse Live-Eye" decal; which has been replaced and overhauled with the "CP24 Breaking News" decal following the acquisition by CTVglobemedia.

Previously, the northwest corner of the building used to contain a Speakers' Corner videobooth, where for a dollar anyone could record two minutes of oneself. The booth was removed as part of renovations and upgrades to the MuchMusic studios in 2010, and the space where the video booth was located has since been enclosed and is used as production space for The Social.

While the outside facade has been restored and remains intact, the building's interior has been modernized into one of the world's most innovative media complexes. 299 Queen Street West was designed to have no TV studios; the entire building was rigged for audio and video. The building has been engineered so that public space, working areas, offices, stairwells, and even the parking lot may all be used as optimal shoot locations. Many television shows produced by the various outlets operating out of the building over the years, such as Citytv's Breakfast Television, CityLine and the former Electric Circus, were filmed live on the ground floor. The ground floor at the corner of Queen and John features giant glass sliding partitions so that the building can be open to the street. The studios formerly used for MuchMusic are now used for The Social, and the studio used for CityLine and Breakfast Television on Citytv, then briefly for eTalk on CTV, is now used for The Marilyn Denis Show.

The annual MuchMusic Video Awards show is/was held as a street party that takes place in the parking lot, studios, rooftop, as well as Queen and John Streets adjacent to the building. Queen and John is subsequently shut down from the early-afternoon into the evening on the day the show is/was scheduled to take place.

299 Queen Street West served as the national broadcast headquarters for the 2007 Live Earth concert, with several CTVgm-owned media outlets and personalities collaborating to broadcast the live event nationally for 28 hours. The building also served as the headquarters for CTV's multi-platform coverage of the 32nd Toronto International Film Festival in September 2007, acting as the launching pad of red carpet coverage, galas, film parties, film premieres, festival breaking news, and other related events. Various corporate divisions, such as eTalk, Star!, MuchMusic, MTV Canada, Bravo!, FashionTelevisionChannel and Canada AM, collaborated on the event coverage.

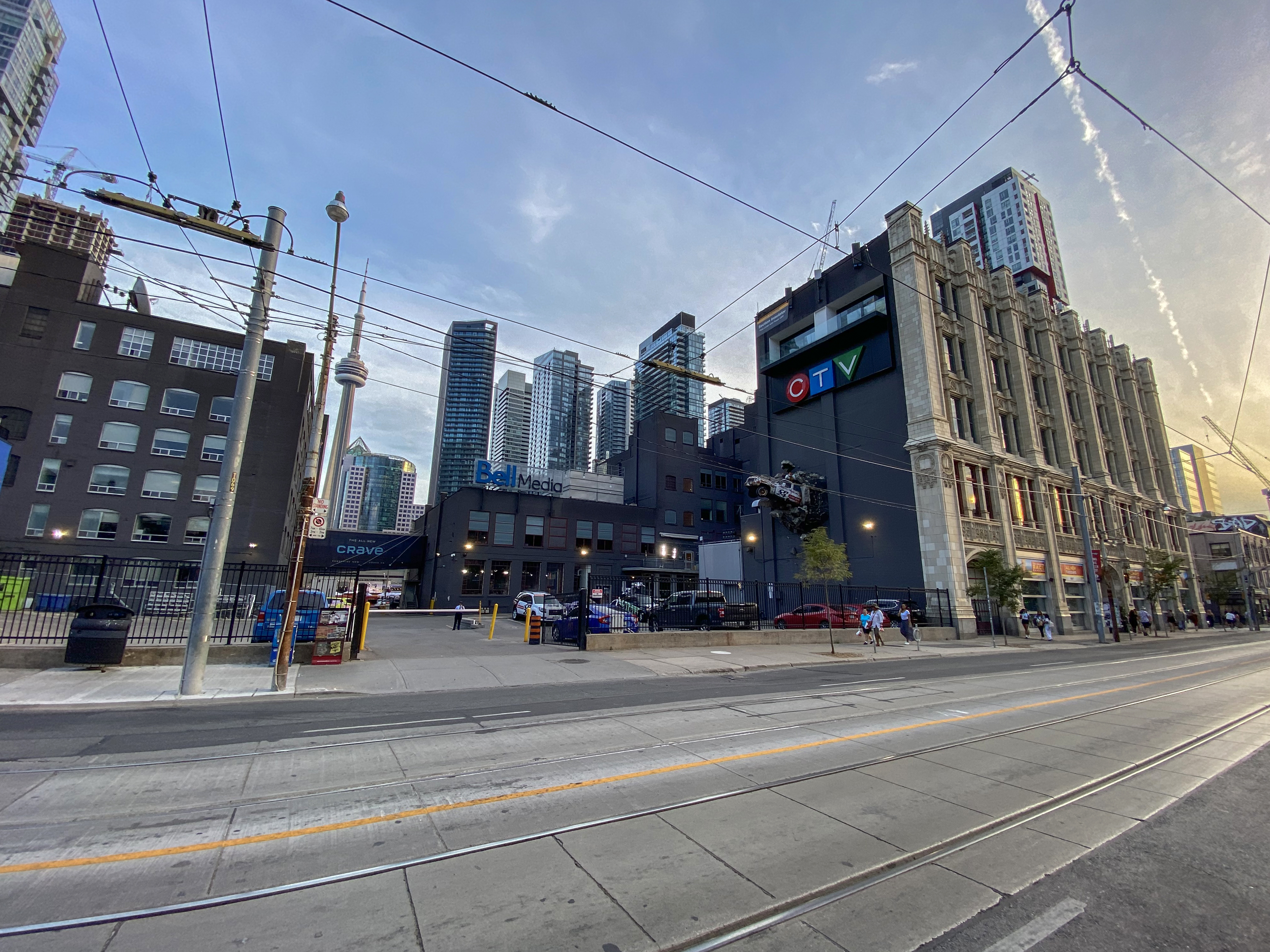
Carpark entrance of the building in 2022

When Bell Media (then CTVglobemedia) acquired CHUM Limited, the CRTC required it to sell Citytv Toronto and four other Citytv stations, which were subsequently acquired by Rogers Media in 2007. Following the sale, the Citytv signage at 299 Queen Street West was gradually removed. The prominent Citytv sign at the front entrance was replaced with an eTalk logo (now removed), and the iconic mural behind the former Virgin Mobile (previously the CHUM-City Store) was redesigned to feature logos of Bell Media television properties, including eTalk. On the building’s east façade, the main Citytv logo was replaced with a CTV logo and a balcony extending from the company boardroom. The Bravo sign above the CP24 studios was also updated with a Bell Media sign after the acquisition.

Citytv Toronto officially vacated the building on September 8, 2009, relocating to a new facility at 33 Dundas Street East.

In 2008, it was announced that CHUM’s Toronto radio stations—CHUM (AM) and CHUM-FM—would move to a nearby building at 250 Richmond Street West. A new 'CHUM Dial 1050 / Radio 1045' sign was unveiled on June 15, 2009, and the relocation was completed on August 19, 2009.

=== 2010–present ===
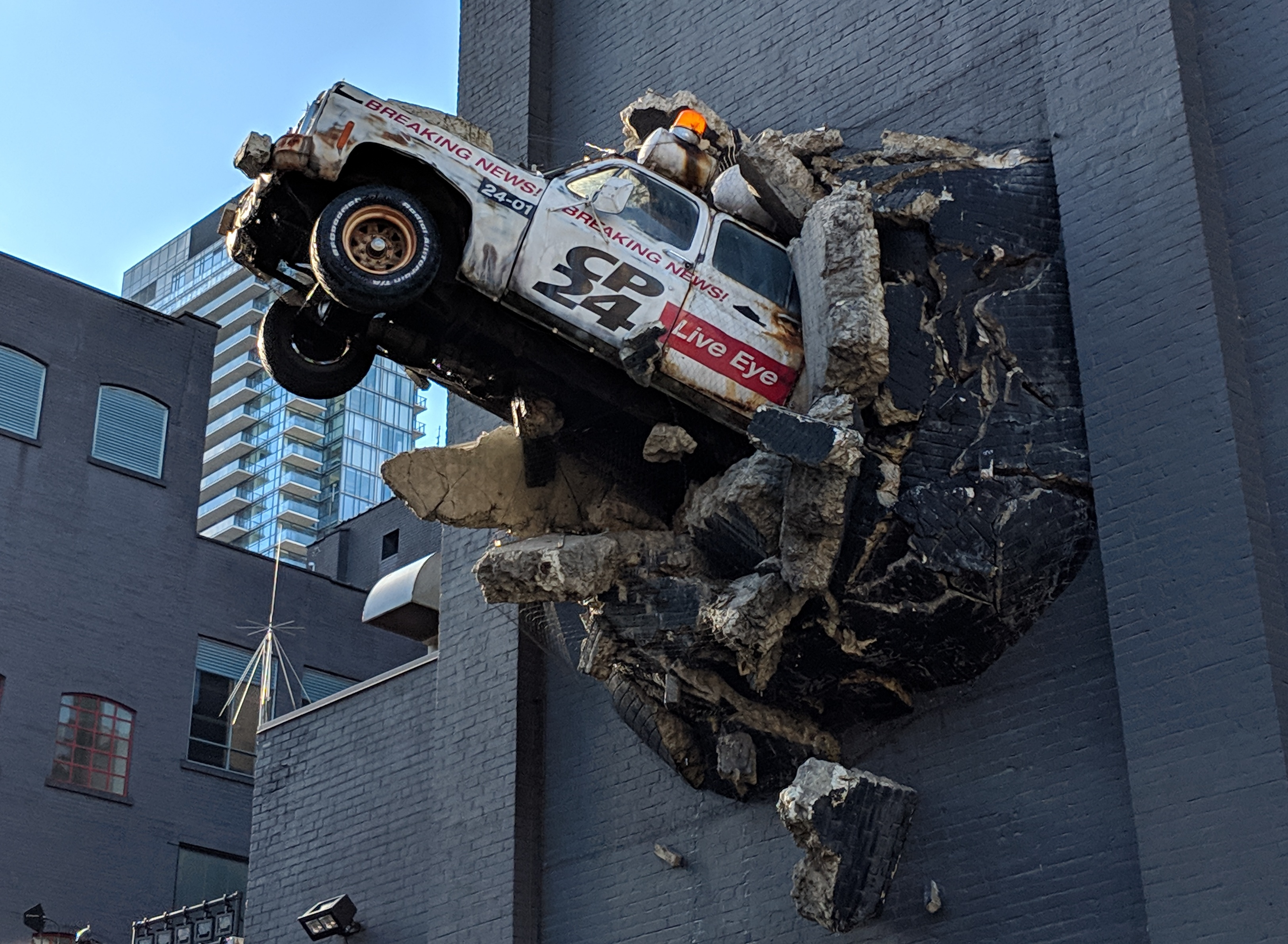
CP24 Breaking News truck on the east wall of the building

BNN later moved into the building on December 6, 2010, and uses the space previously utilized by Citytv's CityNews department, the BNN newsroom is adjacent to that of CP24's newsroom.

On July 30, 2013, Bell Media announced that CFRB and CKFM-FM would be moving to the adjacent building 250 Richmond Street West, (part of the Bell Media Queen Street complex) from 2 St. Clair Avenue West. This marked the end of CFRB's 49-year tenure at their 2 St. Clair Avenue West studios. The move took place on May 10, 2014.

In 2016, 299 Queen West received a landmark designation from the Ontario Association of Architects.

Due to the anticipation of the construction of the Ontario Line, Bell announced on June 20, 2024 that BNN and CP24 would relocate from 299 Queen Street West to 9 Channel Nine Court in Agincourt, with CP24 moving on November 26, 2024, and BNN moving in the third quarter of 2025. Internal memos from 2022 noted that heavy excavation, noise, and transit construction directly beneath and around Queen Street prompted the relocation of sensitive street-level broadcast studios.

== Other Bell Media facilities in Toronto ==
Alongside 299 Queen Street West, other Bell Media properties are operated from other facilities in the Toronto area:

- In mid-2015 it was announced the Virgin Mobile at much store would become a new street front facility for Much Digital Studios as part of their multi-channel new media network. The facility is part of the Bell Media Queen Street complex but is not directly connected to any other building. It had previously been the expanded ChumCity Store (relocated from within the ground-floor studio at 299, when not in use for shows like Breakfast Television or Electric Circus), as well as the first location for Moses Znaimer's MZTV Museum of Television.
- Studios for Bell Media's Toronto-based radio channels including CFRB, CHUM-FM, & CKFM-FM; and Downtown Toronto studios for CHUM (AM), are currently located at 250 Richmond Street West at Richmond and Duncan streets which is adjacent and connected to 299 Queen Street West by bridge to 260 Richmond Street West.
- Several other Bell Media television channels, including CTV's flagship station, CFTO-DT; along with CP24, CTV News Channel; TSN, USA Network, CTV Wild Channel, CTV Nature Channel; as well as the master controls for the CTV and CTV 2 stations in Alberta, Southern Ontario, and Eastern and Atlantic Canada (including CHWI-DT Windsor, CFPL-DT London, CKVR-DT Barrie, CHRO-DT Ottawa, CTV 2 Atlantic, CTV 2 Alberta, CKY-DT Winnipeg, CKCO-DT Kitchener, CTV Northern Ontario, CJOH-DT Ottawa and CFCF-DT Montreal); as well as some of the technical operations for TSN Radio 1050 are operated from 9 Channel Nine Court in Agincourt. Additionally, CHUM (AM)'s studios for television syndication of its radio programs are located inside 9 Channel Nine Court.
