= CHUM-FM =

Radio station in Toronto

Coordinates: 43.64975°N 79.39067°W

- Toronto, Ontario; Canada
- Broadcast area: Greater Toronto Area
- Frequency: 104.5 MHz (HD Radio)
- Branding: CHUM 104.5

Programming
- Language: English
- Format: Hot adult contemporary
- Subchannels: HD2: Pure Country
- Affiliations: Premiere Networks

Ownership
- Owner: Bell Media; (Bell Media Regional Radio Partnership)
- Sister stations: CHUM; CFRB; CKFM-FM; CP24; CFTO-DT; CKVR-DT

History
- First air date: September 1, 1963
- Call sign meaning: CHUM Limited (former owner)

Technical information
- Licensing authority: CRTC
- Class: C1
- ERP: 36,180 watts
- HAAT: 449 metres (1,473 ft)

Links
- Website: iheartradio.ca/chum

CHUM-FM (104.5 FM) is a Canadian radio station in Toronto, Ontario. Owned by Bell Media, the station airs a hot adult contemporary format. CHUM-FM's studios are located at 250 Richmond Street West in the Entertainment District, while its transmitter is located atop the CN Tower. The station is simulcast on Shaw Direct channel 872, and on Bell Satellite TV channel 990.

CHUM-FM is consistently one of Toronto's most popular stations according to Numeris' radio ratings.

== History ==
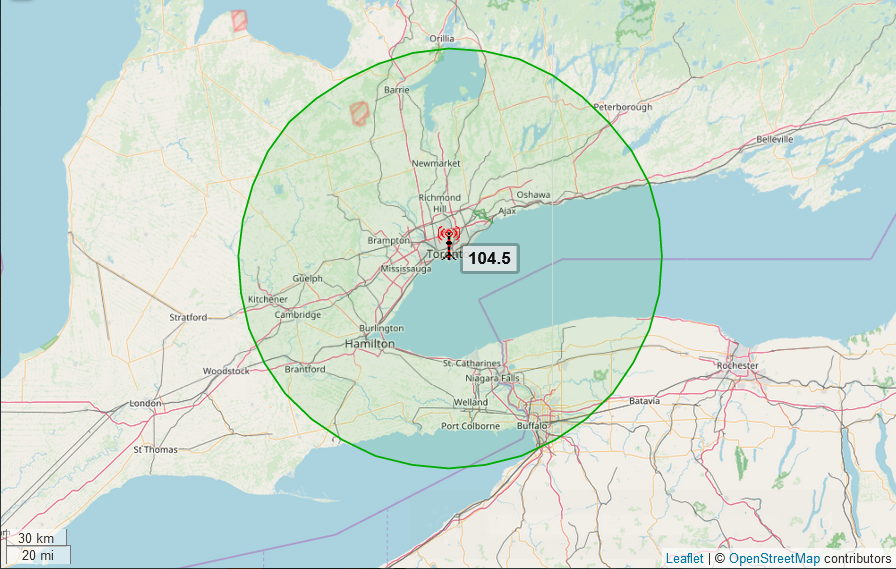
CHUM-FM broadcast area map

CHUM-FM started broadcasting on September 1, 1963, with an ERP of 18,000 watts and a transmitter and studio at 1331 Yonge Street. It aired a classical music format, the first station in Canada to do so. On March 21, 1966, their ERP was increased to 54,000 watts. In 1968, CHUM-FM received approval for a change in its transmitter location and increase in power to 100,000 watts. The transmitter was to be moved to the top of the Manufacturer's Life Building at 250 Bloor Street East.

At midnight on July 1, 1968, CHUM-FM changed formats to progressive rock, a forerunner to the present-day adult album alternative format, by playing a wide range of music ranging from world music and jazz to classical music and folk music. The station also aired public affairs programming, such as In Toronto. The station featured many famous Canadian radio personalities such as Larry Green, Walter Michaels, Steve Harris, Pete and Geets, Reiner Schwarz, Larry Wilson, David Marsden, David Pritchard and actor Rick Moranis.

On December 14, 1973, the station was authorized, along with other Toronto FM and TV stations, to move their transmitter to the top of the CN Tower. The new transmitter was turned on on May 31, 1976, with a reduced ERP of 40,000 watts.

In 1978, CHUM-FM created a Top 30 Album Chart to complement sister station CHUM-AM's Singles Chart. A television version of the countdown was later broadcast on Citytv, featuring music videos for most of the songs in the countdown; the TV version was discontinued in January 2008, following Rogers Communications' acquisition of Citytv.

In June 1984, the station started evolving towards adult contemporary, with the shift completed by that September, though the station would retain a rock lean through the remainder of the decade. Longtime morning show host Roger Ashby would join the station from CHUM-AM on September 2, 1985, and would be paired with Rick Hodge (who had been doing sports updates on the FM's morning show since 1974). Marilyn Denis would join the show in July 1986, with "Roger, Rick & Marilyn" becoming an instant success, making them some of the best known broadcasters in Toronto radio. Throughout the next two decades, CHUM-FM would usually be the highest rated station in the Toronto market, though it would occasionally alternate with CHFI, who was usually ranked a very close second, and would occasionally dip to third place behind CFRB.

The station evolved to its current hot adult contemporary format in 1990.

On May 26, 1998, CHUM-FM was granted a license to broadcast in Digital audio broadcasting using the Eureka-147 system. The transmitter was installed on the CN Tower and broadcast at 1456.304 MHz with an ERP of 5,084 watts.

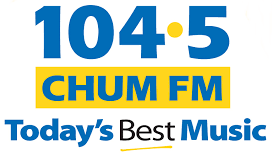
Former logo (2000–2018)

At the 25th Anniversary Canadian Music Industry Awards, held March 8, 2007, CHUM-FM was honoured as Station of the Year, Program Director of the year for CHUM-FM PD Rob Farina, and air talent of the year for Roger, Rick & Marilyn. Former CHUM President Jim Waters was inducted into the Music Industry Hall of Fame that same evening.

On June 22, 2007, CTVglobemedia purchased CHUM-FM and most of the other assets of CHUM Limited, the station's owners since their sign-on in 1963, following approval by the CRTC, while the Citytv stations were sold to Rogers Communications.

On June 23, 2008, Rick Hodge resigned from both CHUM-AM and CHUM-FM to pursue other opportunities. Roger Ashby and Marilyn Denis continued to host mornings, which would then be titled Roger, Darren & Marilyn (when Darren B. Lamb joined the show after a stint of afternoon drive host); Lamb left the station on September 23, 2015, with mornings hosted by Ashby and Denis. After a stint at CFRB and CJEZ-FM, Hodge would later move to sister station CHRE-FM in St. Catharines, where he remained until his retirement in 2019; Lamb would join CHFI in February 2016, and remained until his departure in 2021.

Also in 2008, CTVglobemedia announced they had sold 1331 Yonge Street to a condominium developer and had acquired a new property, 250 Richmond Street West, to serve as the new home of CHUM-AM and CHUM-FM. On August 18, 2009, CHUM-FM left 1331 Yonge Street, ending 46 years at its historic home. The site would become home to a condominium complex. The new building is adjacent (and connected) to Bell Media's headquarters at 299 Queen Street West (which also formerly housed the studios of Citytv).

Until late 2009, CHUM-FM continued to be the most listened to and most influential radio station in Canada with over 1,166,000 weekly listeners according to the BBM data released on December 3, 2007. In December 2009, AC rival CHFI-FM became the most-listened-to radio station in Toronto. During the 2005–2009 season, CHFI continued to usually beat CHUM-FM as the top-rated radio station in Toronto, although CHUM-FM had unseated CHFI in some books.

On September 10, 2010, Bell Canada announced plans to re-acquire 100% of CTVglobemedia's broadcasting arm, including CHUM Radio. When the deal was finalized on April 1, 2011, CTVglobemedia became Bell Media, and likewise CHUM Radio became Bell Media Radio, effectively retiring the last remaining piece of the former CHUM Limited company. CHUM Radio had been the only division of the company to retain the CHUM name following the acquisition of CHUM Limited by CTVglobemedia in 2007.

On June 22, 2018, the station relaunched as CHUM 104.5. The rebranding was intended to appeal more strongly towards women 25–54, being accompanied by a stronger emphasis on social media content and community interaction.

== Programming ==
CHUM-FM's current host lineup includes David Corey, Jamar "J. Niice" McNeil, Ashley Greco, Josie Dye, Nat Hunter, and Ruby Carr.

=== The Marilyn Denis Show ===
CHUM-FM's morning show was hosted by Roger Ashby and Marilyn Denis for 32 years. The show originally featured Rick Hodge as an additional host until he resigned in 2008; after Hodge's resignation, Darren B. Lamb became a co-host, until he too resigned in September 2015. On July 16, 2018, the show returned to three people with the addition of Jamar "J. Niice" McNeil branded as "Roger and Marilyn with Jamar". On October 25, 2018, Ashby announced that he would retire from the morning show effective December 6, after 50 years with CHUM-AM and CHUM-FM. In January 2019, the show would be rebranded as "Marilyn Denis and Jamar" (McNeil taking over Ashby's seat as co-host), and Marilyn Denis as host. In June 2024, McNeil would move to afternoons, and the morning show would be renamed "The Marilyn Denis Show." After a summer of guest hosts, David Corey, the former program director of CHUM-FM, was introduced as Denis' new co-host in September. On February 26, 2026, Denis announced that she would step away from the morning show on June 26 after 40 years with CHUM-FM. Former CHQM-FM morning host Nat Hunter and afternoon co-host Josie Dye began hosting mornings on July 6.

== HD Radio ==
On July 4, 2017, CHUM-FM launched HD Radio multi-casting services. The HD1 sub-channel carried the same programming as the standard analog frequency, while the HD2 sub-channel carried a simulcast of sister station CFRB, and the HD3 sub-channel carried a simulcast of CHUM. In Spring 2018, CHUM-FM stopped broadcasting in HD, with the sub-channels moving to sister station CKFM-FM. CHUM-FM resumed broadcasting in HD around 2024, and as of Summer 2026, its HD2 simulcasts Bell Media’s Pure Country radio network. The HD2 subchannel switched to a simulcast of iHeartRadio's "iHeart The Holidays", playing 24/7 Christmas music on November 12, 2026.

== See also ==
- List of radio stations in Ontario
- 250 Richmond Street West
- CHUM (AM)
- CHUM Chart
- The Marilyn Denis Show
