= CFQX-FM =

Radio station in Selkirk, Manitoba

Coordinates: 50.1567°N 96.9775°W

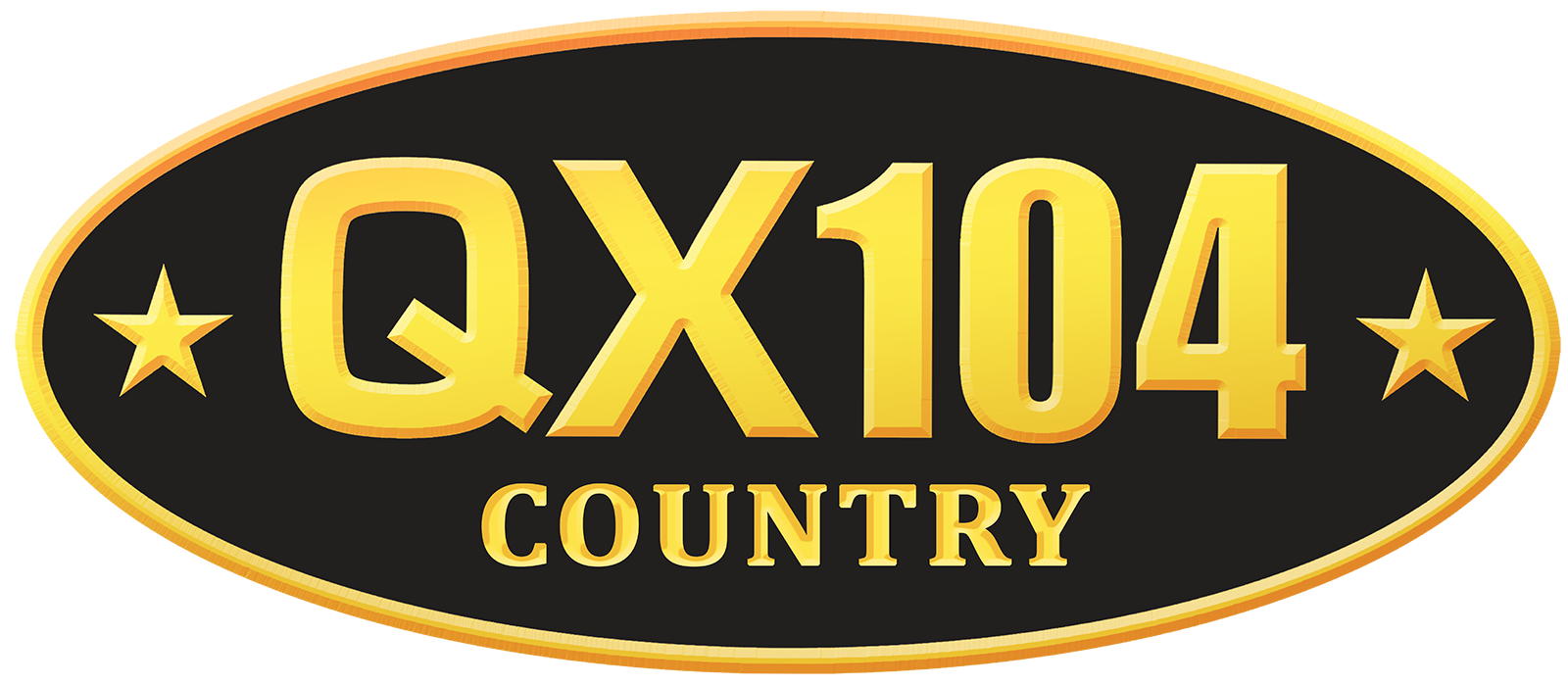
- Selkirk, Manitoba; Canada
- Broadcast area: Winnipeg Metropolitan Region
- Frequency: 104.1 MHz (HD Radio)
- Branding: QX104

Programming
- Format: Country
- Affiliations: Premiere Networks

Ownership
- Owner: Jim Pattison Group; (Jim Pattison Broadcast Group LP)
- Sister stations: CHNW-FM

History
- First air date: November 9, 1981
- Former frequencies: 92.9 MHz (1981–1987)

Technical information
- Licensing authority: CRTC
- Class: C
- ERP: 100,000 watts
- HAAT: 143 metres (469 ft)

Links
- Webcast: Listen live
- Website: qx104country.ca

CFQX-FM (104.1 MHz, QX104) is a commercial radio station in Manitoba. It is licensed to Selkirk and serves the Winnipeg Metropolitan Region. CFQX broadcasts a country format and is owned by the Jim Pattison Group. The studios are at 177 Lombard Avenue in downtown Winnipeg.

CFQX has an effective radiated power (ERP) of 100,000 watts, the maximum for most Canadian stations. The transmitter is located along Pineridge Road 24E off Garven Road/Provincial Rd 213 in the Rural Municipality of Springfield.

== History ==
The station signed on the air on November 9, 1981. CFQX was an easy listening station, originally broadcasting on 92.9 FM. It played quarter-hour sweeps of instrumental music with some soft vocals. The station was originally a family-owned business, the passion project of Denis and Lorna Cloutier, with a small staff of ten full-time employees and five part-time employees. It changed to country music in 1986.

In 1987, the station received approval to move from 92.9 FM to 104.1 FM. In 1997, CFQX was granted a license amendment to move from 104.1 FM to 95.3 FM. However, that frequency change was never implemented.

On September 2, 2011, Astral Media applied to increase CFQX-FM's antenna height from 138.4 to 147.5 metres to give it better coverage. It also sought to relocate its transmitter site. All other technical parameters remained unchanged. This application was approved on November 15, 2011.

As a part of Astral Media's sale to Bell Media, the Jim Pattison Group announced a deal on May 16, 2013. It would acquire CFQX-FM and CHIQ-FM from Astral and Bell respectively for an undisclosed amount. The sale gave the Jim Pattison Group its first stations in Manitoba, and made CFQX a sister station to CHIQ. On December 20, 2013, the CRTC approved Jim Pattison's acquisition of CFQX-FM and CHIQ-FM, the acquisition was closed in early 2014.

On February 11, 2026 CFQX-FM began broadcasting in HD, making it Winnipeg's second HD radio service.
