= CHNW-FM =

Radio station in Winnipeg

Coordinates: 49.7994°N 97.2750°W

- Winnipeg, Manitoba; Canada
- Broadcast area: Winnipeg Metropolitan Region
- Frequency: 94.3 MHz (HD Radio)
- Branding: Alt 94.3

Programming
- Format: Modern rock

Ownership
- Owner: Jim Pattison Group; (Jim Pattison Broadcast Group LP)
- Sister stations: CFQX-FM

History
- First air date: November 7, 1963
- Former call signs: CJQM-FM (1963–1965); CFRW-FM (1965–1975); CHIQ-FM (1975–2021)
- Call sign meaning: "Now" (former branding); Or CHNW "Ninety-four point three Winnipeg" (frequency and city)

Technical information
- Class: C
- ERP: 100,000 watts
- HAAT: 111.5 metres (366 ft)

Links
- Webcast: Listen Live
- Website: alt943.com

CHNW-FM (94.3 MHz, "Alt 94.3") is a radio station in Winnipeg, Manitoba. Owned by Jim Pattison Group, it broadcasts a modern rock format. The station's studios are located at 177 Lombard Avenue in Downtown Winnipeg (along with its sister station CFQX-FM), while its transmitter is located near Oak Bluff.

== History ==
=== Early years/Q94 ===
CHIQ-FM first launched in 1963 as CJQM-FM, which simulcast CJQM-AM, an easy listening station owned by Winnipeg Broadcast Associates Ltd. (a division of Vancouver Broadcast Associates, the original owner of Vancouver stations CHQM and CHQM-FM). Despite the success of the format in Vancouver at CHQM, CJQM failed to attract an audience in Winnipeg and was sold in 1965, becoming CFRW-FM, and then was bought by CHUM Radio. CHUM Radio then changed CFRW's call letters to CHIQ-FM in 1975.

After 1975, CHIQ was branded as Q94FM. It aired an adult contemporary format, and used the slogan "Winnipeg's Lite Rock Choice". In the mid-1990s, CHIQ was an affiliate of the syndicated dance music show "Pirate Radio" with Chris Sheppard. In 1997, CHIQ switched to a Hot AC format, still named "Q94FM", with the slogan of "Today's Best Music".

On August 29, 2006, at 8:45 a.m., CHIQ announced that after 25 years that it would no longer exist and that a new station would be created within a seven-day time span based on comments provided by listeners. Prior to the announcement, the regular morning staff had not shown up for work. This left many to speculate that they knew of the upcoming changes and did not want to announce their own demise. A later report debunked that theory for the interim. The station then went on for two weeks allowing listeners to call in and choose how they wanted the new 94.3 to be like.

On September 5, 2006, at 7:45 a.m., CHIQ re-launched its Hot AC format as the All New Q94, and kept its callsign, as well as its slogan and personalities.

In 2007, CHIQ-FM along with the other CHUM stations were sold to CTVglobemedia (now Bell Media). During this time, long-time morning show hosts Beau & Tom, who had been on CHIQ since 1989, moved to sister station CFWM-FM.

=== Curve, Fab ===
On August 29, 2008, CHIQ-FM flipped to an eclectic format as Curve 94.3; positioned as "Winnipeg's Pop Alternative", the new format was promoted as featuring a mix of contemporary hits with alternative and indie pop crossovers. Program director Andrew Long stated that the format was "a reflection of changing musical trends".

On November 17, 2010, the majority of the station's airstaff was released. On November 23, CHIQ began stunting with Christmas music for the holiday season. On December 26, 2010, CHIQ-FM flipped to classic hits as Fab 94.3; the new format was promoted as primarily featuring music from the 1960s and 1970s (along with some 1980s music), supplanting CFRW's former oldies format before its flip to sports radio. On January 4, 2011, Beau, Tom and Frazier returned to CHIQ, with the former Curve morning duo of Jay Richardson and Andrea Collin moving to CFWM.

On January 27, 2012, long-time personality Tom Milroy retired from radio after 20 years on CHIQ-FM, three years on sister station CFWM-FM and almost 40 years in the radio business.

=== Jim Pattison Group ownership ===
On May 16, 2013, the Jim Pattison Group announced an agreement to acquire CFQX-FM and CHIQ-FM from Astral Media and Bell Media respectively for an undisclosed amount. The sale was part of divestments tied to Bell's acquisition of Astral Media, and gave Jim Pattison Group its first stations in Manitoba. On December 20, 2013, the CRTC approved Jim Pattison's acquisition of CHIQ-FM and CFQX-FM, The acquisition was closed in early 2014.

On February 5, 2016, at 10:00 a.m., CHIQ flipped to classic rock as 94.3 The Drive, focusing on rock hits from the 1970s and 1980s. Winnipeg radio veteran Tom McGouran hosted the morning show with Vicki Shae, Kelly Parker hosted middays, Alix Michaels hosted afternoons, and Dez Daniels hosted on weekends.

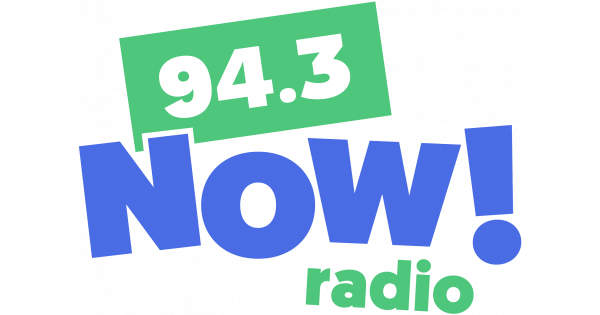
Logo as "Now! Radio" (2021-2024)

On October 13, 2021, CHIQ released its on-air talent and began running jockless. At the same time, cryptic billboard advertisements containing the word "NOW" began to appear across the city. At 1 p.m. on October 18, CHIQ flipped to hot adult contemporary branded as 94.3 Now! Radio; the brand and format was modeled after Edmonton sister station CKNO-FM, which carried a focus on topical discussions and listener engagement wth DJs. The station changed its call letters to CHNW-FM to match the new branding.

On October 31, 2024, at midnight, CHNW dropped Now! and flipped to modern rock as Alt 94.3; the new format competes to an extent with CJKR-FM, which had recently flipped to a classic alternative format. General manager Mark Patric stated that the station would feature current hits and classic alternative rock from the past 25 years, with the station promoting core artists such as Arkells, Cage the Elephant, Coldplay, Death Cab for Cutie, and Foo Fighters.

Between May 27 and June 17, 2026, CHNW conducted regulatory required testing of HD-Radio transmission on its new Nautel transmitter. Following a successful trial, Innovation, Science and Economic Development Canada issued a broadcast certificate for IBOC operation on July 21, 2026. The radio transmitter was relocated from Fort Whyte to be collocated with its sister station CFQX-FM near Birds Hill Park.
