= Media in London, Ontario =

This article gives an overview of the media in London, Ontario, Canada.

== Television ==
London pioneered in the establishment of cable television in Canada, being either the first or second city in Canada with cable service, when Ed Jarmain and others wired the first 15 homes, and had to purchase TV sets for 14 of them. London's first cable system, established in 1952, broadcast American signals that crossed the border, including WICU from Erie, Pennsylvania. Shortly afterward, another cable operator, named Community Television was also established serving southwestern London and a "gentleman's agreement" set a boundary, convoluted in the old London South (Wortley Road) area; Community Television was later purchased by Maclean-Hunter, and Maclean Hunter was ultimately purchased by Rogers Cablesystems. London Cable TV later merged with Canadian Cablesystems, a cable operator owned by the Famous Players Theatre chain, with Jarmain remaining as chief executive. Canadian Cablesystems was acquired by Rogers in 1978, and Rogers purchased Maclean Hunter in 1993. Rogers TV Cable 13, brings around 60 of the 76 home and away games of the London Knights of the Ontario Hockey League. In the 2009 OHL Playoffs Rogers TV carried all home and away games in the London Knights schedule. This was the first time games from the Tulio Arena in Erie, PA and The Dow Event Centre in Saginaw, MI were broadcast on Canadian television. Rogers TV also has exclusive coverage of the Western Mustangs.

London had the second private local television station in Canada, CFPL (on-air November 28, 1953), and CFPL was the first Canadian local channel to broadcast in colour (1966). As part of CHUM Limited's NewNet system was branded as The New PL. In August 2005, CFPL was re-branded as A-Channel. In August 2008, A-Channel was re-branded to A, effectively re-branding the CFPL station once more and on August 31, 2011, A was re-branded as CTV Two until September 2018 now CTV 2. Several other stations from neighbouring cities have established retransmitters or are otherwise available in London, as follows:

OTA virtual channel (PSIP)	OTA actual channel	Rogers Cable	Call sign	Network	Notes
6.1	17 (UHF)	3	CIII-DT	Global	Transmitted from Paris; rebroadcaster of CIII-DT-41 (Toronto)
10.1	10 (VHF)	9	CFPL-DT	CTV 2	
13.1	13 (VHF)	12	CKCO-DT	CTV	Transmitted from Kitchener
16.4	14 (UHF)	16	CITS-DT-2	Yes TV	Rebroadcaster of CITS-DT (Hamilton)
18.1	18 (UHF)	2	CICO-DT-18	TVOntario	Rebroadcaster of CICA-DT (Toronto)
20.1	20 (UHF)	14	CJMT-DT-1	Omni Television (OMNI 2)	Rebroadcaster of CJMT-DT (Toronto)
31.1	31 (UHF)	7	CITY-DT-2	Citytv	Transmitted from Woodstock; rebroadcaster of CITY-DT (Toronto)
51.1	51 (UHF)	11	CHCH-DT-2	Independent	Transmitted from Alvinston; rebroadcaster of CHCH-DT (Hamilton)
69.1	48 (UHF)	4	CFMT-DT-1	Omni Television (OMNI-1)	Rebroadcaster of CFMT-DT (Toronto)
–	–	13	–	Rogers TV	Community channel for Rogers Cable subscribers

Both the English- and French-language television services of the Canadian Broadcasting Corporation (CBC Television and Ici Radio-Canada Télé, respectively) and French-language provincial broadcaster TFO are only available via pay television in London.

On cable, television stations from Detroit, Michigan are available, along with several stations from the Cleveland, Ohio, Erie, Pennsylvania and Buffalo, New York markets.

From late 1970 to the mid-1980s, Erie dominated as its four network affiliates were the only American stations available on the basic cable dial of two-thirds of Londoners, and Londoners came to know Erie fairly well, familiar with Mayor Louis Tullio, Millcreek Mall, the Miracle Mile and other Erie landmarks. Londoners were contributors to WQLN-TV, the public broadcasting station. Erie stations, other than WQLN, are now no longer carried on London cable systems.

== Radio ==
London also had radio since 1922 when CJGC was established. It joined a Windsor station in early 1933 to become CKLW, but a local station was reestablished late that year, CFPL. A sister FM station was established in 1948, and both are now owned by Corus Entertainment. Competitor CKSL started in 1956; a third station, CJOE, was founded by Joe McManus in 1967, changing to CJBK in 1973. In addition to one station each with Fanshawe College (CIXX) and the University of Western Ontario (UWO) (CHRW-FM), other stations are associated with existing stations.

CBC Radio One operates a CBC production centre, CBCL-FM, at the London Public Library's Central Branch that produces a local morning show, London Morning, and a regional afternoon show, Afternoon Drive, that covers Southwestern Ontario from London to Windsor in addition to the network's standard national and province-wide programming. Before 1978, CBC programming was carried on CFPL-AM, as well as on CFPL-FM prior to 1972. The CBC continues to operate rebroadcast transmitter CBBL for CBC Music, relaying the signal of Toronto's CBL-FM.

The following stations broadcast in London:

Frequency	Call sign	Branding	Format	Owner	Notes
AM 980	CFPL	980 CFPL	News radio, talk radio	Corus Entertainment	
FM 90.1	CIAL-FM		multilingual	Malayalam Community Radio Inc.	New approved on January 16, 2023 CRTC 2023-10
FM 92.7	CJBX-FM	Pure Country 93	Country music	Bell Media Radio	
FM 93.5	CBCL-FM	CBC Radio One	Talk radio, public radio	Canadian Broadcasting Corporation	
FM 94.9	CHRW-FM	Radio Western	Campus radio	Radio Western	Broadcasts from the University of Western Ontario. Was 94.7 FM originally.
FM 95.9	CFPL-FM	FM96	Active rock	Corus Entertainment	
FM 97.5	CIQM-FM	97.5 Virgin Radio	Contemporary hit radio	Bell Media Radio	
FM 98.1	CKLO-FM	Classic Rock 98.1	Classic rock	Blackburn Radio	On-Air as of July 5, 2011
FM 99.3	CJBC-4-FM	Ici Radio-Canada Première	Talk radio/public radio	Canadian Broadcasting Corporation	Rebroadcaster of CJBC (Toronto)
FM 99.9	CHJX-FM	Faith FM	Contemporary Christian music	Sound of Faith Broadcasting	
FM 100.5	CBBL-FM	CBC Music	public radio, variety	Canadian Broadcasting Corporation	Rebroadcaster of CBL-FM (Toronto)
FM 102.3	CHST-FM	Jack 102.3	Adult hits	Rogers Radio	
FM 106.9	CIXX-FM	106.9 The X	Campus radio/alternative music	Fanshawe College	

=== Defunct radio stations in London ===
Frequency	Call sign	Branding	Format	Owner	Notes
AM 1290	CJBK	NewsTalk 1290	News radio, talk radio	Bell Media Radio	Signed off the air permanently June 14, 2023.
AM 1410	CKSL	Funny 1410	Radio comedy	Bell Media Radio	Signed off the air permanently August 14, 2016, at midnight.

Radio stations from other nearby cities can also be heard in London. Those stations are:

Frequency	Call sign	Branding	Format	Owner	Notes
FM 91.5	CKBT-FM	The Beat	top 40/CHR	Corus Entertainment	Heard in London via their Paris, ON Transmitter
FM 92.1	CKPC-FM	Lite 92	soft adult contemporary	Evanov Radio Group	
FM 94.1	CKZM-FM	MyFM	adult contemporary	My Broadcasting Corporation	Licensed in October 2010; signed on May 20, 2011
FM 96.7	CHYM-FM	CHYM 96.7	adult contemporary	Rogers Radio	Provides City Grade Coverage in London
FM 101.3	CKOT-FM	Easy 101.3	adult contemporary	Rogers Radio	
FM 103.1	CFHK-FM	Fresh 103.1	hot adult contemporary	Corus Entertainment	Operates from Corus Entertainment's studios in London even though its city of license legally remains in St. Thomas
FM 103.9	CKDK-FM	Country 104	country music	Corus Entertainment	Based in Woodstock with a London office, and advertises for concerts and stores in London. Previously known as 1039 FM with a classic hits format.
FM 104.7	CIHR-FM	Heart FM	adult contemporary	Byrnes Communications	Recent Power Increase provides city grade coverage in London
FM 105.3	CFCA-FM	105.3 Virgin Radio	Top 40/CHR	Bell Media	Has City Grade coverage in London
FM 107.3	CJDL-FM	Country 107.3	country music	Rogers Radio	

=== Defunct radio stations in nearby cities ===
Frequency	Call sign	Branding	Format	Owner	Notes
AM 1380	CKPC (AM)	Arise 1380	christian radio	Evanov Radio Group	Signed off the air permanently August 4, 2023
AM 1510	CKOT-AM	Country 1510	country music	Rogers Radio	Signed off the air permanently on February 17, 2013

=== Notes ===
There is also a First Nations/community radio station in Oneida Nation of the Thames which operates at 89.5 FM. This unlicensed station is branded as Oneida Radio 89.5 FM The Eagle or Eagle Radio 89.5 and has no call sign.

== Newspapers ==
Until 1937, London had two daily newspapers: the London Free Press (established 1849) and the London Advertiser. The Advertiser folded in 1937. The Free Press, formerly owned by the Blackburn family, is now owned by Sun Media, a subsidiary of Quebecor Media Inc.

Sun Media's subsidiary Bowes Publishing also owns and publishes The Londoner, a community-focused weekly started by Controller Gord Hume and former Free Press editor-in-chief Philip R. McLeod in 2002.

Founded in 1989 by Bret Downe, Scene was published every two weeks, on a Thursday. It ceased publication in 2018. (subscription required)

Our London is a free community newspaper launched in May 2015 that is delivered every Thursday to all London homes. It is published by Metroland Media, a wholly owned subsidiary of Torstar Corporation. Our London was formerly the London Community News which ran from June 2011 to May 2015. It was sold to Postmedia in November 2017 and will eventually cease publication. Our London ceased publication in 2017.

Founded in 2003, L'Action is a weekly French language newspaper serving London, Sarnia, Woodstock and Owen Sound.

== Telecommunications ==
The independent London Telephone Company (established 1879) was bought by the Bell Telephone Company of Canada in 1881; the Byron Telephone Company, serving areas annexed by London in 1961 and 1993, was purchased in August 1960. The Ilderton Telephone Company served areas now within London city limits, but ceded those areas to Bell Canada when customers demanded improved phone service; further cession would make the company unviable so it was sold to Bell Canada. Bell Canada continues to be the incumbent local exchange carrier for London.

== Personal communication ==
Canada Post has a large presence in the London area. The postal region that London is located in is the Huron-Rideau Region. The London Mail Processing Plant (LMPP) is located at 951 Highbury Avenue and coordinates and processes all the mail for the N Code area from Kitchener to Windsor. Canada Post has several other administration offices, as well as six depots.

== Alternative media ==
Londoners also took part in London-based online publishing through the now defunct newspaper London Fuse.
