= CFPL =

CFPL may refer to:

- CFPL (AM), a radio station (980 AM) licensed to serve London, Ontario, Canada
- CFPL-FM, a radio station (95.9 FM) licensed to serve London
- CFPL-DT, a television station (channel 10) licensed to serve London
- Commonwealth Financial Planning Limited, a division of the Commonwealth Bank, Australia
