= Riv =

Riv may refer to:

- Riv., which is Augustus Quirinus Rivinus
- River

== See also ==
- RIV
