= Tillson Harrison =

Canadian physician and adventurer

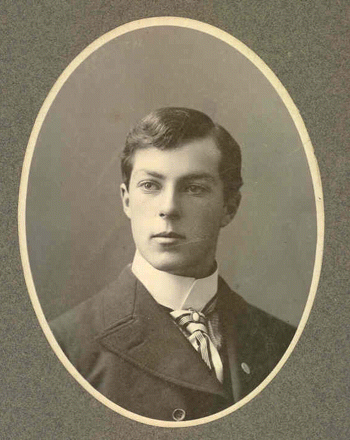
- Born: January 7, 1881; Tillsonburg, Ontario
- Died: January 10, 1947 (aged 66); Kaifeng, China
- Occupations: Physician and humanitarian

Tillson Lever Harrison (January 7, 1881 – January 10, 1947) was a Canadian physician, army officer and adventurer. Moving to New York and enlisting in the United States Army at an early age, he later returned to Canada to attend the University of Toronto before practising as a physician in a number of dangerous positions, such as the Chief of Medical Staff to Pancho Villa and the doctor for the Chinese Labour Corps, a workforce of over 200,000 men. After World War I, he traveled throughout the Middle East, treating venereal disease and operating an X-ray facility in Lod, Mandatory Palestine.

After attempting to elope with one of his Middle East hospital patients, Harrison was deported to Canada but managed to jump ship in Morocco and join the Free State Army. In the 1930s, he traveled through 15 countries and dependencies performing medical duties, and served as a ship's doctor on a liner that crossed the Indian Ocean during World War II . From 1946 until his death, he assisted in the United Nations Relief and Rehabilitation Administration (UNRRA) in China, saving many lives.

By the end of his life, Harrison could speak six languages, had participated in seven wars, and was married to four women at the same time. His daughter Rosalind said that the character Indiana Jones was based on him. According to Rosalind, film producers George Lucas and Steven Spielberg contacted her after her father's death and conducted a series of interviews, during which she provided an account of his life.

== Early life ==
Harrison was born on January 7, 1881, in Tillsonburg, Ontario, a town named for his great-grandfather George. His grandfather, Edwin Delevan Tillson, was the builder of what is now the Annandale National Historic Site. As a child, Harrison was considered a troublemaker. On one occasion he locked his grandmother in her bedroom and on another became a local newspaper sensation after his attempt to travel to Cuba was discovered. In 1894, he was enrolled at the Upper Canada College in Toronto, but left the next year. At the age of 14, he ran away to join the 22nd Oxford Rifles militia, headquartered in Oxford County, but was returned home when it was discovered that he was underage. Soon after, he moved to New York City to join the United States Army Engineers and serve as part of the peacekeeping force in the Philippines after the defeat of Spain in 1898, and for a brief period to help put down the Boxer Rebellion in China. Mostly involved in the running of labor gangs building supply roads to remote areas, Harrison was involved in only one firefight. However, when his maternal grandfather, Edwin "E.D." Tillson (whose company evolved into Quaker Oats), discovered what the 20-year-old was doing, he used his connections to influence General Adna Chaffee into issuing a general order for the recall of Harrison from the field. While serving with the US Army, Harrison contracted cholera and returned to Canada. Using the inheritance he had received from his recently deceased grandfather, Harrison began attending the University of Toronto medical school before marrying Sybil Wilkin, a lawyer's daughter, in 1905.

After his graduation from medical school in 1907, Harrison gained employment with the Hudson's Bay Company and began treating the Cree community of Alberta and acting as the local postmaster. Soon after, Harrison again moved his family to Washington, Idaho and finally Drewsey, Oregon, where he became a doctor, pharmacist, mayor, developer and rancher. In 1909, Harrison fathered a daughter, Rosalind, with his wife Sybil. In 1912, the Journal of the American Medical Association published an article written by Harrison, titled "Cesarean Section Under Difficulties", which documented a caesarean section he performed in a remote ranch-house lit by an oil lamp. Because of his restless nature, Harrison left his family in Oregon and traveled to London in 1913 to undergo postgraduate work in gynecology and obstetrics. When World War I began in 1914, Harrison assisted in the war effort in Belgium. While there, he met a Turkish woman named Eva, and married her without divorcing his first wife. In 1915, Harrison and his new wife traveled to El Paso, Texas, to settle down.

== North American conflict and World War I ==
Shortly after arriving in Texas, Harrison took the dangerous job of Chief of Medical Staff to Mexican revolutionary general Pancho Villa. In one situation, Harrison was captured by Villa's foe Venustiano Carranza, later the President of Mexico. The doctor was sentenced to death, but when Carranza became ill, Harrison was spared as he was the only qualified physician available. Harrison kept the general in a state of near-recovery, enabling him to escape and deliver military information to US forces stationed along the border.

After a brief stay among the Mormon community of southern Utah, Harrison enlisted in the Canadian Army Medical Corps in 1917 and was stationed at a French hospital, where he tended to the needs of the Chinese Labour Corps. Quickly learning the language and customs of this group of some 200,000 men, Harrison successfully treated many bilharzia, catarrh and tuberculosis cases, significantly reducing the number of sick members of the Corps during the winter of 1917–18.

== Interwar period ==
After World War I, Harrison traveled the Middle East performing medical duties such as treating prostitutes afflicted with venereal disease in Constantinople and operating an X-ray facility in Lod, Mandatory Palestine. Although still not legally divorced from his first two wives, Harrison married Filomena Abela, a Maltese woman at Alexandria in 1920. However, the newlyweds could not find escape from the adventure that had followed Harrison all his life. Harrison and his new wife's train was ambushed by a band of Syrians disillusioned with a group of politicians. The quick thinking of the recently thrice-married physician prevented his new wife's broken leg from developing into gangrene.

Still in charge of the Constantinople hospital, he attempted to elope with one of his patients, but was captured and tried for breach of conduct, as the female patient was in fact the wife of a Turkish officer. While being deported to Canada, Harrison escaped while his ship was docked in Morocco. Making his way to Ireland, Harrison posed as a Catholic and joined the Free State Army. After he was discovered, he quickly crossed to Wales to treat the coal miners there for silicosis. In 1923 Harrison married his fourth wife, Eva Olwen Bowen in Cardiff, still without divorcing his three previous wives, and set off with her on an adventure in the Caribbean. It is thought that Harrison deserted her sometime in the mid-1920s. During the 1930s Harrison worked in 15 countries and dependencies across Latin America and the Middle East. For one year, he served as the physician for a guerrilla army fighting the Japanese, who were then engaged in the Second Sino-Japanese War with China. After 1938, Harrison traveled to Shanghai using borrowed funds from a medical school classmate in Jamaica and from his own brother in Ontario, and set up a private medical practice, assisting the Chinese Red Cross wherever possible.

== World War II and beyond ==
Between 1941 and 1946, Harrison was the ship's doctor on board the Demodocus, a steam liner ferrying supplies to Allied forces across the Indian Ocean. After the war, Harrison wanted to assist the United Nations Relief and Rehabilitation Administration (UNRRA), but had to falsify his records by subtracting seven years off his age to qualify for service. During this time, he served in China delivering much-needed supplies to a country devastated by the long Second Sino-Japanese War and once even saved the lives of 90 students by sheltering them from a Kuomintang officer. By donning an American army officer's uniform, Harrison was able to convince the Kuomintang officer to not check a barge which held the students hidden inside.

Last journey from Shanghai to Kaifeng in train then to Zhangqiu by truck

On December 4, 1946, Harrison set out from Shanghai with approximately 50 tonnes of supplies. On this train journey, he was to be accompanied by a Russian UNRRA worker and Chinese welfare representatives. Due to repeated Kuomintang inspections, the train journey constantly suffered from delays. The first such delay occurred at Nanjing and lasted four days; the second such delay, at Xuzhou, was of equal duration. At one station, the medical supplies were unhooked from the train's engine car and left on a bleak plain. The two UNRRA workers did not have clean water to drink and were forced to boil ditch water which was polluted with human waste. To add to the dire situation, Harrison's blanket and shoes were stolen, and due to the cold, he began to suffer from frostbite. Two weeks after Harrison left Shanghai, his train was permitted to move again, but there were problems still ahead. At each one of the 20 stations en route to Kaifeng, the train was delayed for up to three hours. Upon arrival at Kaifeng, the journey had to be completed by truck and ox cart. After completing one delivery, he returned to Kaifeng to pick up a second load, but could not continue past the Zhangqiu branch of the receiving hospital. Harrison died of exposure on January 10, 1947, near Kaifeng in China, aged 66.

By the end of his life, Tillson Harrison could speak no less than six different languages, had participated in seven wars and, although this was not discovered for several years after his death, was married to four women at the same time.

While he is virtually unknown in Canada, Harrison is widely honored in China. A statue in his likeness stands tall in Shanghai, his burial site at an Anglican compound in Kaifeng is home to the Dr. Tillson Harrison Memorial School, and the Harrison International Peace Hospital in Hengshui treats approximately 800 outpatients every day. The town of Tillsonburg, Ontario (named for Harrison's great-grandfather) maintains a lasting relationship with the hospital, which was renamed as such from the previous name of Handan International Peace Hospital in 1947. In 1988, the Prime Minister of Canada, Brian Mulroney, sent a commemorative letter to the Chinese ambassador to mark the centenary of Harrison's birth. However at that time it was not made clear that Harrison had falsified his age when enlisting in the UNRRA, and the celebrations took place seven years after the actual centenary. The same year, Harrison's remains were re-interred in a large tomb in a public ceremony, which many Canadians were invited to attend.

According to Harrison's daughter, Rosalind, several decades after her father's death, film producers George Lucas and Steven Spielberg contacted her, and in a series of interviews, Rosalind provided an account of her father's illustrious life. This, she claims, became the inspiration for the highly successful Indiana Jones film series. In recent times, Harrison was the subject of a five-part CBC Radio Morningside dramatization of his life, written by Antanas Sileika.
