= CHLO =

CHLO may refer to:

- CHLO (AM), a radio station (530 AM) licensed to Brampton, Ontario, Canada
- CFHK-FM, a radio station (103.1 FM) licensed to St. Thomas, Ontario, Canada, which held the call sign CHLO from 1948 to 1994
