= CJDL-FM =

Radio station in Tillsonburg, Ontario

Coordinates: 43°00′44″N 80°50′09″W

- Tillsonburg, Ontario; Canada
- Broadcast area: Southwestern Ontario
- Frequency: 107.3 MHz
- Branding: Tilsonburg's New Country 107.3

Programming
- Format: Country

Ownership
- Owner: My Broadcasting Corporation
- Sister stations: CKOT-FM

History
- First air date: April 30, 1955
- Former call signs: CKOT (1955–2013)
- Former frequencies: 1510 kHz
- Call sign meaning: John D. Lamers (owner of Tillsonburg Broadcasting Company)

Technical information
- Class: B
- ERP: 4,500 watts
- HAAT: 225 metres (738 ft)

Links
- Webcast: Listen Live
- Website: oxfordtoday.ca

CJDL-FM (107.3 FM, "Tilsonburg's New Country 107.3") is a radio station licensed to Tillsonburg, Ontario. Owned by My Broadcasting Corporation, it broadcasts a country format.

The station was established in 1955 as the AM station CKOT, before migrating to FM in 2007. It had been operated by the locally owned Tillsonburg Broadcasting Company until 2017, when it was sold to Rogers Media.

== History ==
The station was originally licensed on April 26, 1955, and began broadcasts four days later at 1510 AM. The station was owned by John B. Lamers Sr., Ken Orton, and four other shareholders under the name of Tillsonburg Broadcasting Company, Limited. The transmitter and two 160-foot (49 m) high towers were located in Lot 16, Concession 2, of Middleton Township in Norfolk County. The station was a daytimer (operating only during the day) for much of its existence and was also the last remaining Canadian daytime-only station still in operation until it shut down its AM side in 2013.

In 1958, the station was granted permission to increase to 1,000 watts of power (in the daytime only), using one 165-foot (50 m) tower. John B. Lamers became the sole owner of CKOT when he bought out his partners four years later.

CKOT gained a sister station in 1965, when CKOT-FM signed on. The FM station originally served as a simulcast/rebroadcast transmitter of CKOT. CKOT-FM eventually became so successful, it was spun off into its own radio station in 1970. CKOT-FM adopted the Sound of Music format, while CKOT remained as "Active, Lively, Community Information Radio".

In 1973, the station requested a change of frequency from 1510 to 1600 kHz, which had been vacated by CJRN in Niagara Falls. The request was denied, and the frequency ultimately went to CFRS (now CHCD-FM) in nearby Simcoe, Ontario.

On July 11, 1974, CKOT was granted approval to increase its daytime-only power on 1510 kHz from 1,000 watts to 10,000 watts. It was also given approval to move its transmitter location roughly 10 miles (16 kilometres) to Glen Meyer, southeast of Tillsonburg.

On May 17, 1988, CKOT was finally able to end its status as a daytimer and add a night-time signal on the same frequency (to operate non-stop). The station was given permission to double its power to 20,000 watts as well. However, these changes were not implemented because of American technical objections from stations across Lake Erie that feared possible signal interference.

=== Migration aspirations ===
By 1993, CKOT had hoped to migrate to the FM and had its hopes set for 102.3 MHz. However, that frequency went to CKDK-FM in Woodstock. The station had been considering a number of solutions to fix its daytime-only signal on AM. One possible solution was to use AM 1510 in the day and another frequency at night, and at one point, a move to AM 1200 24/7 was considered.

In 1999, the station lost another chance to move to FM. By this time, it had become a country music station, and wanted to move to 102.3 MHz (occupied by CKDK-FM Woodstock), but this was awarded to CHUM Limited for their London, Ontario, rebroadcast transmitter.

In 2005, the station had received approval to migrate to FM. The station had proposed to occupy the frequency of 104.7 MHz, but this was awarded to a new station in Woodstock. The station had to find an alternate FM frequency. Its application for FM 104.7 meant it would have operated at 2,300 watts (with a maximum of 5,000 watts), and an antenna height of 163.5 metres (sharing the same tower as CKOT-FM). The station had also been granted a temporary permit to operate at 10 kW at day and 10 kW at night on the 1200 kHz frequency as well, a request that had previously been declined.

CKOT has also been able to broadcast on very low power at night, to Tillsonburg and Ingersoll, partially shedding its daytimer status, broadcasting at 20 kW in the daytime and 10 kW at night, on the same frequency (1510 kHz), as well as on 1200 kHz, as a temporary measure to cure the station's problem of being a daytimer, until it could find an available FM frequency.

==== Moving to the FM band ====
In 2006, the CRTC had opened up the frequency of 107.3 FM for a new station in Tillsonburg, and had approved of CKOT's owners to simulcast CKOT on that frequency during the day only, much like how CKOT-FM had migrated to the FM band in the early 1970s. The approval of an FM translator for CKOT was not without interventions.

Byrnes Communications, owners of nearby CIHR-FM in Woodstock, protested that an FM translator for CKOT would stall CIHR-FM's growth, as it has been on the air for "less than a year", and had not become an established station yet, unlike CKOT (despite being a daytimer, it has been around since 1955), particularly because CKOT's signal would be increased to Ingersoll, Woodstock, St. Thomas and parts of London, where CIHR-FM contains its targeted audience.

Tillsonburg Broadcasting Company gave a rebuttal, which was that Oxford County, Woodstock and Ingersoll are a part of the London radio market, and it is allowed to have an FM broadcast translator, especially with CRTC approval, given its longtime technical restrictions of being a daytimer AM station. The company did admit that converting CKOT to the FM band would result in a change of its radio contour (listening area), but would not adversely impact CIHR-FM, as its signal would just barely reach Woodstock. In this manner, TBCL sees no problems with this situation, especially since CIHR-FM will be able to establish itself, people in Woodstock can still listen in (though the listening audience in Woodstock is relatively small), and (probably most importantly) CKOT-AM can finally move to the FM dial and fix its previously mentioned technical limitations.

The CRTC's view is that CKOT establishing an FM-band translator, and then moving to the FM band completely is in the best public interest, as it will increase its audio quality, it will be able to broadcast its country music and news to Tillsonburg and area at night, and no stations will be adversely affected. It further assured Byrnes Broadcasting Inc. that the radio contours for 107.3 FM were smaller than the ones for 104.7 FM (which Byrnes had beaten Tillsonburg Broadcasting for to establish CIHR-FM in the first place). The commission had further stated that the impact would be minimal on CIHR-FM (an adult contemporary station), as CKOT is a traditional country music station, and a move to FM would help "repatriate" listeners who tune into out-of-market country music stations from London, Hamilton, and even across the lake in Erie, Pennsylvania. The CRTC had also stated they "usually" place a restriction as to how much simulcasting is normally given to an FM translator of an AM station, but they granted an exception in the case of CKOT, because of its limitations.

In short, the CRTC has given approval for CKOT to convert to the FM band on 107.3 FM with an ERP of 4.5 kW, and allows for continued night-time (24/7) operation on 107.3 FM, but on the condition that it simulcasts on 1510 AM at all times during the daytime. The station is still technically licensed as CKOT on 1510, though its primary signal is now CJDL-FM.

On August 1, 2007, at 5:00 a.m. CKOT made its move to 107.3 FM with the call letters CJDL-FM, to simulcast the AM 1510 signal. On February 17, 2013, CKOT signed off. It was one of Canada's last remaining daytime AM stations.

=== Acquisition by Rogers, My Broadcasting ===
Former logo as "107.3 Country" used until 2025

On September 27, 2016, Tillsonburg Broadcasting Company announced that it had sold its stations to Rogers Media pending CRTC approval. General manager Carolyn Lamers stated that her grandfather had personally met Ted Rogers when he was younger, and stated that they had "come full circle" with Rogers' purchase of the stations. The CRTC approved the transfer of ownership on July 13, 2017. There were no announced plans to change the formats of either CKOT or CJDL, and Lamers will remain in her position.

On November 22, 2024, Rogers announced its intent to sell CJDL-FM and CKOT-FM to My Broadcasting Corporation, pending CRTC approval. The transaction was approved on June 30, 2025; on August 1, 2025, CJDL was rebranded as Tilsonburg's New Country 107.3 with no change in format.
