= Glen Meyer, Ontario =

Community of Norfolk County, Ontario, Canada

Glen Meyer
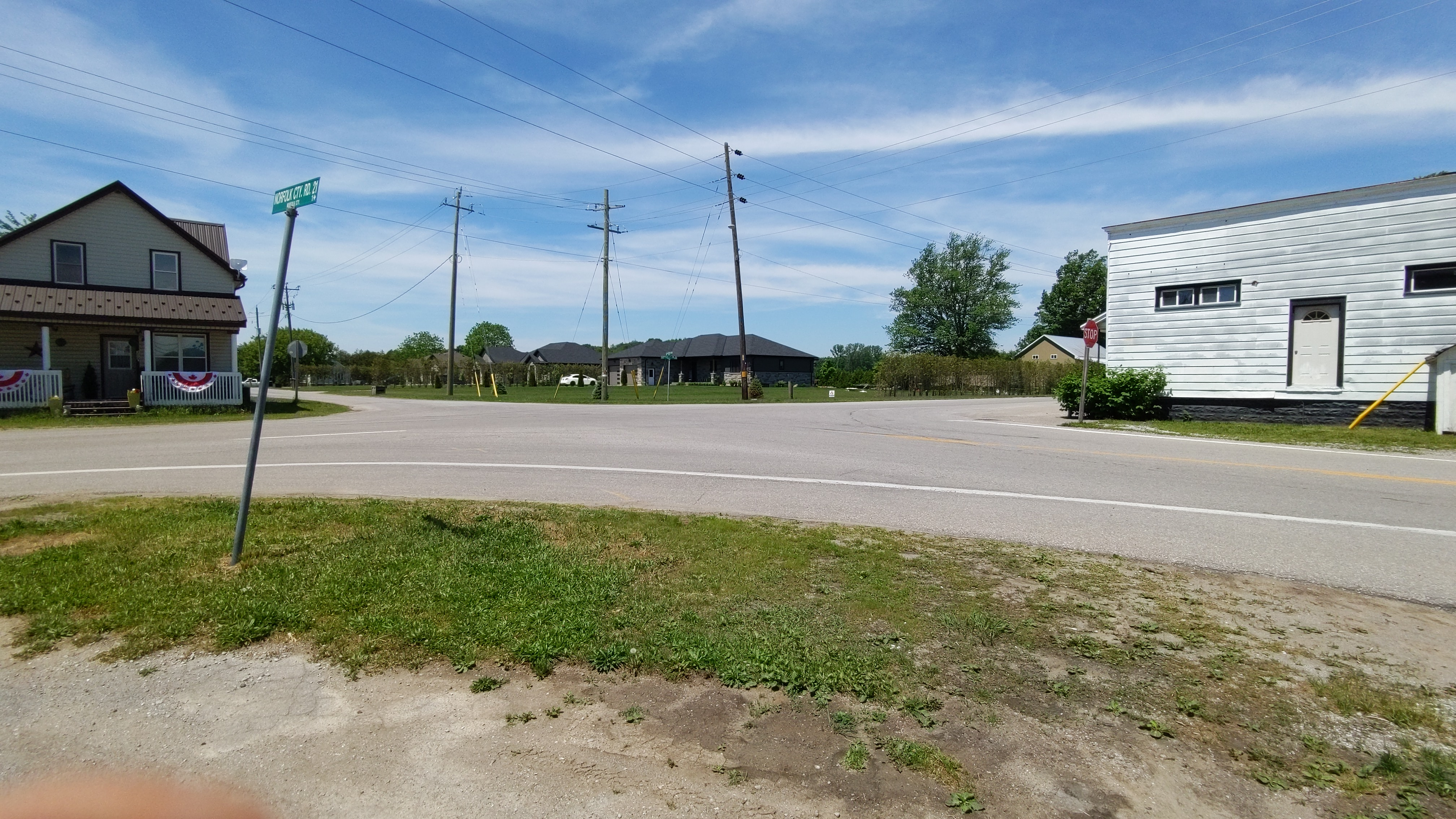
- Interactive map of Glen Meyer
- Coordinates: 42°43′53″N 80°40′23″W
- Country: Canada
- Province: Ontario
- County: Norfolk
- Amalgamated into Norfolk County: 2001 (Single-tier municipality)

Government
  - Mayor: Kristal Chopp
  - Governing Body: The Council of The Corporation of Norfolk County
  - MPs: Diane Finley (Con)
  - MPPs: Toby Barrett (PC)
- Forward sortation area: N0J 1K0

Glen Meyer is an unincorporated community in Norfolk County, Ontario, Canada, southeast of Tillsonburg.

== Summary ==
George Edward Meyer settled here in 1854. When he became postmaster in 1865, he named the community after himself.

During World War II, a labour camp was approved for Glen Meyer, to house enemy merchant seamen held as prisoners of war who would work under guard at local farms. In 1974, radio station CKOT (now CJDL-FM) received permission to move its transmitter to Glen Meyer.

In 2001, Haldimand-Norfolk was dissolved into two separate single-tier counties. Glen Meyer became part of the newly formed County of Norfolk.

The term "Glen Meyer" refers to an Iroquoian aboriginal culture related to the Neutral Nation people. Glen Meyer's earliest known inhabitants, from around the year 1000 until approximately 300–350 years later, were the Algonquin nation. They were noted flint-workers and evidence of their skill in crafting arrowheads is still to be found in open worked field areas surrounding the village. The next wave of inhabitants were the Attawandaron nation, the Neutrals, who occupied the region from about 1350 until their absorption by the Iroquois in the year 1651. The last significant native nation to occupy the area was the Mississaugas.

=== Climate ===
The winter of 1975 was the only unusually mild winter in the region from 1897 to 1977. From the late 1990s onwards, winters have become more mild due to changes in climate brought on by global warming. Glen Meyer traditionally belongs to the humid continental climate zone, even with the recent mild winters and warmer dry summers. As in all communities, towns and cities throughout the world, global warming due to human industrial activity has drastically altered the climate of Glen Meyer over the decades.

The warmest summers that Glen Meyer has witnessed occurred in 1998, 2003, 2005, 2006, 2007, 2009 (with the exception of the month of July), 2010, 2012, 2013, 2014, 2015 and 2016.

Should the sea levels rise by 60 metres or 200 feet, Glen Meyer would not be affected by flooding. However, it may be affected by droughts as a by-product of the dislocation of available fresh water and may be forced to rely on desalinated salt water piped in from the Eastern United States. Constructing the proper infrastructure to carry the water hundreds of miles away would take considerable manpower along with significant economic costs and an unprecedented level of cooperation from multiple federal, state/provincial, and municipal governments.
