= CHRW =

CHRW may refer to:

- CHRW-FM, a radio station (94.9 FM) licensed to London, Ontario, Canada
- C. H. Robinson Worldwide (NASDAQ symbol CHRW)
