= Annandale National Historic Site =

Coordinates: 42°51′45″N 80°43′18″W

Annandale House
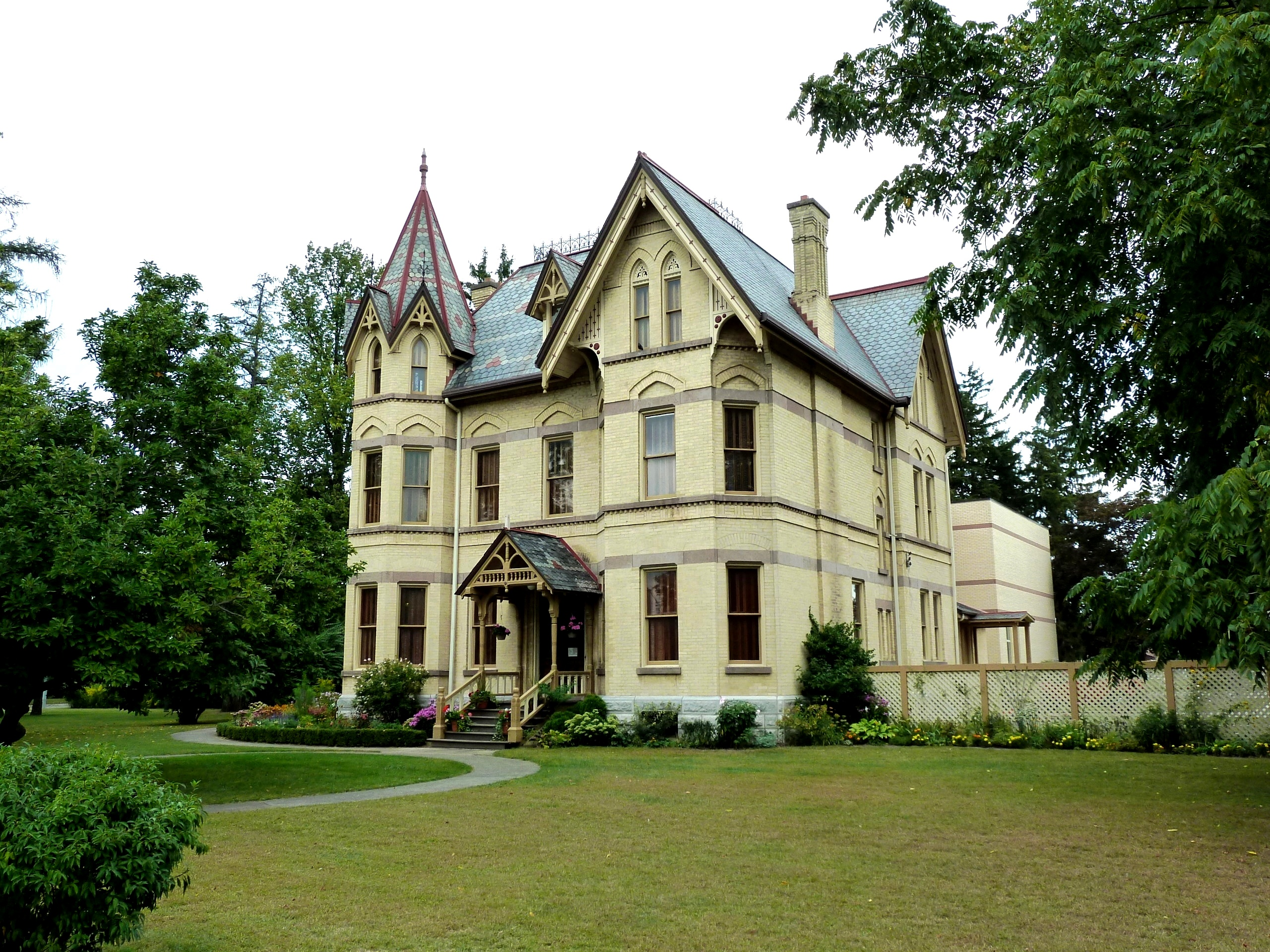
- Annandale House
- Location: 30 Tillson Avenue; Tillsonburg, Ontario; Canada; N4G 2Z8
- Website: Website

National Historic Site of Canada
- Official name: Annandale House / Tillsonburg Museum National Historic Site of Canada
- Designated: 1997

Annandale National Historic Site is a National Historic Site of Canada located in Tillsonburg, Ontario, Canada. It was built in 1880 by Edwin Delevan Tillson (Tillsonburg's first mayor, son of the founder of Tillsonburg, George Tillson), and his wife Mary Ann as part of Mr. Tillson's retirement project, Annandale Farm. The Tillsons moved into the house in 1883. The interior of Annandale House is a living monument to the Victorian style of design, known as the "Aesthetic Art Movement."

The site was designated as a National Historic Site in 1997 for its interior decor.

== Aesthetic art movement ==
The Aesthetic art movement has its roots in England and it swept through North America during the 1880s. It remained quite popular for just over a decade. Followers of the movement included the architect John Ruskin, the designer William Morris, the American painter James Whistler and the most vocal supporter, author and playwright Oscar Wilde. Within Annandale House, there is an abundance of decoration representative of the 1880s Aesthetic art movement. Aestheticism can be found in the wall coverings, painted ceilings, fireplaces, stained and etched glass and carved into the woodwork. Annandale House is one of the few surviving examples of homes decorated in this style in Canada.

== Connection to Oscar Wilde ==
Irish author, poet and playwright, Oscar Wilde was the most vocal supporter of this movement and in 1882 gave his lecture The House Beautiful in Woodstock, Ontario in which he said “And so I said, find your subjects in everyday life; your own men and women, your own flowers and fields, your own hills and mountains, these are what your art should represent to you.” Mary Ann Tillson attended his lecture and listened to this unusual man. Intrigued by what she heard, she put to practice much of what he had said when decorating her new home. She would use as he had suggested, subjects of her everyday life mixed with many traditional Victorian designs.

== See also ==
- Aestheticism
- Doors Open Canada
- Oscar Wilde
- Tillsonburg
