= E. D. Tillson =

Canadian businessman and politician (1825–1902)

1st Mayor of Tillsonburg
- In office 1872–1873
- Preceded by: Office established
- Succeeded by: William McDonald

Personal details
- Born: March 26, 1825 Normandale, Ontario, Canada
- Died: January 31, 1902 (aged 76) Tillsonburg, Ontario
- Spouse: Mary Ann Van Norman (m. 1850)
- Parent: George Tillson

Edwin Delevan Tillson was a businessman and politician from Tillsonburg, Ontario, and the town's first mayor.

Tillson was born on March 26, 1825, in Normandale, Ontario, to George Tillson and Nancy Barker. He attended Norwalk Academy in Ohio for seven months, and then taught for three months, using the money he made there in order to fund his first sawmill with Wright Barker, and Charles Cody on Clear Creek in 1846. Tillson would then marry Mary Ann Van Norman in 1850. By the 1860s, Tillson owned many mills and businesses throughout Tillsonburg, including a sawmill, a grist-mill, a planning-mill, a sash-and-door factory, and a store. In 1865, Tillson began to expand his business to include an oat mill, which would be the basis of his "Tillson Pan-Dried Oats" which became a famous cereal throughout Canada. Tillson initiated Tillsonburg's incorporation as a town in 1872, and served as its first mayor, previously acting as a reeve of the town. In 1881, Tillson began work on the Annandale House, built on his farm, and now a national historic site. Tillson died on January 31, 1902, in the Annandale House.
