= Gerry Livingston =

Canadian businessman

- Born: 1914; Smiths Falls, Ontario, Canada
- Died: 18 October 1988 (aged 73–74); Toronto, Ontario, Canada
- Burial place: Saint Peter's Cemetery, Middlesex County, Canada
- Education: Assumption University

Gerald A. Livingston (1914 – 18 October 1988) was a Canadian businessman.

== Life and career ==
Livingston was born in Smiths Falls, Ontario in 1914. He was a graduate of Assumption University in Windsor, Ontario and was an accomplished athlete throughout his youth and years at college. After graduating, he played on championship teams in the Detroit Baseball federation and was also courted by the Detroit Tigers.

In 1941 he founded Livingston Wood Products in London, Ontario to manufacture wooden shipping crates and wooden parts for automobiles and farm implements. To accommodate the expanding business, he relocated it to Tillsonburg in 1943. In 1945 he incorporated this company as Livingston Lumber and Manufacturing Limited.

Livingston's business interests grew to include Canadian and international packaging and distribution services and also a florist shop, transportation services, a garage and a restaurant. In 1967 the company's corporate name was changed to Livingston Industries Limited and, in 1968, Livingston sold most of his shares to Allpak Products Limited (now called Ivest). Livingston remained involved with the company and was chairman of the board until 1978, when Allpak bought the company outright and took it private. Livingston continued as the honorary chairman until his death in 1988. The company has undergone further changes, including being bought and sold by others, plus buying and selling business themselves. It exists today as Livingston International.

Sports, particularly basketball remained a passion throughout Livingston's life. During the 1940s, he helped build a new arena, co-sponsored a hockey team, and became the main supporter of basketball, softball and baseball teams in Tillsonburg. His method of recruiting for the Tillsonburg Livingston basketball team, the "Livvies," was direct; any high school athlete with a talent for the game was assured of a job at the Livingston plant.

In 1952 the senior Livvies, with players such as Bill Coulthard, defeated Winnipeg in the national championships to advance to the Olympic trials where they defeated the university champions, the Western Mustangs. The Livvies, therefore, represented Canada at the 1952 Olympic Games in Helsinki, Finland. In 1960 the Livvies won the national title and represented Canada for the second time at the pre-Olympic qualifiers for Rome.

A devout Catholic, Livingston was active at St. Mary's parish in Tillsonburg. In recognition of his charitable work, he was knighted by Pope John XXIII in 1962, received the Order of St. Gregory and was later named a Knight of Malta.

A plaque honouring Livingston is on the "Wall of Fame" in Tillsonburg Town Centre to recognize his contributions to the town, including donation of a building and continued financing that supports the Tillsonburg & District Multi-Service Centre. It was dedicated in 1985 during "Gerry Livingston Weekend" festivities.

Livingston had another consuming interest that he pursued in his retirement—real estate. He planned and built a gated community and golf club known as Wyndemere Country Club in Naples, Florida, a favourite winter retreat for Canadians. The club was named after his horse farm in Tillsonburg, and is situated on Livingston Road.

Livingston died in October 1988, at the age of 73 or 74. He was inducted into the Canadian Basketball Hall of Fame in 2001.
