= Livingston International =

North American customs broker

Livingston
- Type: Incorporated customs brokerage and compliance company
- Predecessor: Livingston Group
- Founded: 1945
- Founder: Gerry Livingston
- Successor: Livingston International
- Headquarters: 405 The West Mall, Toronto, ON M9C 5K7, CA +1 310.712.1850, Canada
- Number of locations: Over 80 in Canada, the United States, Mexico, Europe and Asia including U.S. head office in Chicago, Illinois
- Area served: Worldwide
- Key people: Robert Smith (CEO), Silvio Silvestre (CFO), Mohan Subbarayan (CIO), Lisa Zangari (CPO)
- Services: customs brokerage, customs and trade consulting, freight forwarding, business process outsourcing, global trade management, trade technology services
- Revenue: $1.3B
- Owner: Purolator Inc
- Number of employees: 2,700+
- Website: https://www.livingstonintl.com/

Livingston is a North American provider of customs brokerage services. It provides customs brokerage, trade consulting and international freight forwarding services to importers and exporters throughout North America and around the globe. Headquartered in Toronto, Ontario, Canada, with U.S. headquarters in Chicago, Livingston has over 2,700 employees located at more than 125 border points, seaports, airports and other locations across in North America, Europe and Asia. Livingston is currently Canada's largest customs broker and third-largest in the United States.

Livingston has been certified as a member of Partners in Protection (PIP) by the Canada Border Services Agency (CBSA) and is also a member of the U.S. counterpart to PIP, C-TPAT, the Customs Trade Partnership against Terrorism.

== Services ==
Livingston’s headquarters are in Toronto, Ontario, Canada and their U.S. head offices are located in Chicago, Illinois. It offers services in customs brokerage, customs and trade consulting, freight forwarding, and business process outsourcing as well as technology services.

== History ==
Founded in 1945 by Gerry Livingston as an export packaging company, Livingston began under the name Livingston Lumber & Manufacturing Ltd. Over the first few decades, the company grew as it became heavily involved in warehousing and transportation. Just over 30 years later, in 1978, Livingston launched into the customs brokerage business. Through mergers and acquisitions, this aspect of the company finally overshadowed its warehousing and distribution businesses. In 1981, the company name was changed to Livingston International Inc. Later in the '80s, the company restructured its businesses under the name Livingston Group and operated only its customs brokerage division under the Livingston International banner. Today, all the company's business is conducted under the Livingston International name. Livingston is the largest customs broker in Canada, handling a massive volume of North American cross-border entries and regulatory compliance management.

== 1945 to 1969: The early years ==
- 1945 Gerry Livingston, a manufacturer of wooden shipping crates and wooden parts for automobiles, incorporated his company in Tillsonburg, Ontario as Livingston Lumber & Manufacturing Limited.
- 1950 Changed name to Livingston Wood Manufacturing Limited, and the first public offering of shares was issued.
- 1951 Made its first acquisition: Essex Steel and Wood Manufacturing Limited, a company that owned two saw mills in Bracebridge, Ontario.
- 1951 Harry Wade joined Livingston.
- 1953 Entered into its first automobile export contract, with Ford.
- 1957 Trucking began under the name Lakeshore Transport.
- 1960 Tillsonburg Livvies won the Canadian Basketball Championship again and represented Canada at the qualifying stage for the Olympics in Rome.
- 1964 General Motors became an export packing customer.
- 1964 U.K. export packing operation began in partnership with the Ivey family company, Allpak.
- 1967 Changed name to Livingston Industries Limited.
- 1967 Listed shares on the Toronto Stock Exchange
- 1968 Gerry Livingston sold control of Livingston to Allpak.
- 1969 Geno Francolini joined Livingston as president and CEO; Gerry Livingston became chairman of the board.

== 1969 to 1988: Diversification and expansion ==
- 1969 Acquired J. Waldie Company Limited of St. Thomas, Ontario and merged it with Lakeshore Transport to form Livingston Transportation Limited.
- 1970 Don Gordon became a director.
- 1971 Began public warehousing operations with the acquisition of warehousing facilities in London, Ontario.
- 1974 Acquired Mutual Warehousing Limited and Principals’ Warehouse Limited, both based in Ontario.
- 1975 Acquired Bennett & Shaw Storage and Distribution Limited of Calgary, Alberta as well as three Ontario-based trucking companies.
- 1976 Acquired Manitoba Cartage and Storage Limited as well as Inland Warehousing Limited of Calgary.
- 1978 Allpak acquired all outstanding shares of Livingston and took the company private again; Dick Ivey (senior) replaced Gerry Livingston as chairman of the board.
- 1978 Opened an export packing facility in Jacksonville, Florida as well as U.K.-based warehousing operations.
- 1978 Acquired its first customs brokerage and freight forwarding operations by purchasing International Customs Brokers of Toronto, Ontario and I.C.B. Freight Services (U.K.) Limited of the United Kingdom.
- 1979 Acquired Consolidated Warehousing Limited of Winnipeg, Manitoba and Edmonton, Alberta.
- 1979 Acquired Import Customs Brokers of Toronto and merged it with International Customs Brokers to form International-Import Customs Brokers.
- 1979 Richard Ivey became a company director; Harry Wade became company president under CEO Geno Francolini.
- 1980 Sold Livingston Transport Limited.
- 1980 Acquired Border Brokers Limited of Toronto.
- 1981 Changed name to Livingston International Inc.
- 1981 Acquired the Houston-based export packer of oil rigs, Houston Export Crating Company Inc.
- 1981 Acquired Hobelman Port Services Inc., a Baltimore-based import car servicing company, and part of R.G. Hobelman Company Inc., a U.S.-based customs broker and freight forwarder.
- 1983 Acquired Seaway/Midwest Limited, Canada’s largest public warehousing company, and Midwest Pharmaceuticals Limited from Molson.
- 1983 Geno Francolini resigned as company CEO.
- 1984 Closed Houston Export Crating.
- 1984 Sold Hobelman Port Services.
- 1985 Harry Wade retired, and Martin Fabi became president and CEO.
- 1986 Changed name to Livingston Group but customs brokerage division continued to operate under the Livingston International banner.
- 1986 Moved head offices from Tillsonburg to Toronto.
- 1986 Amalgamated Border Brokers and International-Import Customs Brokers under the Livingston name.
- 1986 Sold R.G. Hobelman and separately sold the export packing division to a management group.
- 1986 Don Gordon replaced Martin Fabi as president and CEO.
- 1988 Gerry Livingston died.

== 1988 to 1993: Corporate restructuring ==
- 1988 Livingston executives decided to focus on the North American market.
- 1988 Separated Livingston’s Canadian health care operations from the public warehousing division.
- 1988 Opened its first U.S.-based health care distribution facility in Wilmington, Delaware.
- 1990 Sold its U.K. warehousing operations and international freight forwarding operations.
- 1990 Acquired Mendelssohn-Commercial Limited, a major Canadian customs broker, and its subsidiary Arthur L. Brunette.
- 1991 Acquired To-Market Services Limited, a Vancouver, British Columbia–based warehousing company.
- 1991 Richard Ivey replaced Dick Ivey (senior) as company chairman.

== 1993 to 2010: Growth in customs brokerage ==
- 1993 Expanded customs brokerage operations into the U.S. to become the first customs broker to operate coast to coast on both sides of the Canada-U.S. border.
- 1994-1995 Don Gordon retired from Livingston; Jean-René Halde joined as president and CEO.
- 1995 Made considerable investments in technology, introducing value-added software solutions to support its core brokerage services.
- 1995 Transport Canada launched the Registrar of Imported Vehicles; Livingston was a subcontractor to the program.
- 1997 Livingston International was acquired by a private equity investment firm, CAI; parent company Livingston Group continued in warehousing and distribution until 2001, when it sold its remaining business to an industry participant.
- 1997 Peter Luit was appointed president and CEO.
- 1999 Acquired Canada’s oldest customs brokerage company, Blaiklock Inc., founded in 1876.
- 2000 Won the exclusive contract to administer the Registrar of Imported Vehicles on behalf of Transport Canada.
- 2000 Named one of Canada’s 50 Best Managed Companies.
- 2001 Named one of Canada’s 50 Best Managed Companies for the second year in a row.
- 2002 Went public through an initial public offering as an income trust with an initial market capitalization of C$151,026,000; Livingston International Income Fund began trading on the Toronto Stock Exchange under the symbol LIV.UN.
- 2002 Acquired Consultrans, an Ontario-based transportation brokerage and warehousing company, doubling its North American truck transportation management operations.
- 2003 Acquired Chicago-based customs broker and freight forwarder Osowski, launching Livingston into the U.S. air/sea customs and freight forwarding market.
- 2005 Acquired Great Lakes Customs Brokerage, a U.S. northern border customs broker, and its software application business, SouthRanch.
- 2005 Acquired Searail Cargo Surveys, a Vancouver-based vehicle transportation broker.
- 2006 Acquired its largest competitor, PBB Global Logistics, a Canadian-based customs broker and third-party logistics company operating in North America; also included in this agreement were M&C International Trade, Unicity Customs Services and Unicity Integrated Logistics.
- 2010 Livingston was purchased by a consortium of Sterling Partners, a private equity firm based in Chicago and Baltimore, and the Canada Pension Plan Investment Board.
- 2010 Sold its North American domestic warehousing and ground transportation businesses, operated under Livingston Integrated Logistics, to DB Schenker.
- 2010 Sold its event logistics business, operated as Livingston Event Logistics, to ICECORP Logistics.

== 2010 to present ==
- 2010 Acquired Maquilogistics, a customs broker and warehousing business focused on companies importing into the United States from Mexico, including those taking advantage of the Mexican maquiladora program.
- 2011 Acquired the Hipage Company of Norfolk Virginia, one of the oldest customs brokers in the United States.
- 2011 Was selected to participate in U.S. Customs and Border Protection's Simplified Entry Pilot.
- 2012 Acquired JPMorgan Chase Bank's customs and trade compliance operation formerly known as Vastera.
- 2012 Acquired Dell Will Customs Brokers Canada Inc. based in Windsor, Ontario. The company did not acquire Dell Will Customs Brokers USA.
- 2012 Acquired M.G. Maher & Co. Inc. as well as the business of its affiliate MCLX Inc.
- 2012 Selected CGI Group Inc. to provide IT infrastructure and software support
- 2012 Acquired Houston, Texas–based Evans and Wood & Co., Inc.
- 2012 Transmitted first Simplified Entry to U.S. Customs and Border Protection (CBP).
- 2012 Acquired U.S. northern-border broker Norman G. Jensen, Inc. ("NGJ"), including its Canadian brokerage company, Jensen Customs Brokers Canada ("JCBC")
- 2013 Acquired New Orleans–based MBLX to expand international freight forwarding in the U.S.
- 2013 Signed a purchase agreement to acquire the assets of Advantex Express Inc. as well as the shares of its two U.S. entities, Advantex Express, Inc. and Andina Group International, Inc.
- 2013 Steven C. Preston appointed as CEO
- 2013 Was selected to participate in U.S. Customs and Border Protection's Broker Importer Self-Assessment Pre-Certification pilot
- 2013 Acquired transportation and customs brokerage firm Advantex Express
- 2017 Dan McHugh appointed as CEO
- 2019 Livingston was acquired by private equity firm Platinum Equity for an undisclosed sum
- 2019 Tom Cronin appointed as CEO
- 2019 On June 21, 2019 the court approved a settlement of $19 million to be paid by Livingson after failing to compensate its non-management employees when they worked overtime since August 15, 2007.
- 2024 Acquired customs broker Norman G. Jensen
- 2025 Livingston was acquired by Purolator Inc as a wholly owned subsidiary on February 4, 2025 from Platinum Equity for an undisclosed sum.

== See also ==
- Customs brokerage
- International freight forwarding
- Trade facilitation
- Logistics
- Third-party logistics
- Incoterms
