= CHRW-FM =

Radio station at the University of Western Ontario in Canada

- London, Ontario; Canada
- Frequency: 94.9 MHz
- Branding: 94.9 Radio Western

Programming
- Languages: English, Multilingual
- Format: campus radio

Ownership
- Owner: University of Western Ontario

History
- First air date: October 31, 1981
- Former frequencies: 94.7 FM (1981–2003)
- Call sign meaning: Radio Western

Technical information
- Licensing authority: CRTC
- Class: A
- ERP: 6 kW
- HAAT: 107.4 metres (352 ft)
- Transmitter coordinates: 42°59′08″N 81°14′48″W

Links
- Webcast: Listen live
- Website: 94.9 Radio Western

CHRW-FM (branded as Radio Western) is a Canadian radio station, broadcasting at 94.9 FM in London, Ontario. It is licensed as a community-based campus radio station by the Canadian Radio-television and Telecommunications Commission. The station broadcasts from Room 250 of the University Community Centre at the University of Western Ontario.

The station is operated primarily by volunteers from both Western and the greater London community, although it is managed by a small team of industry trained staff and governed by a board of directors. Radio Western regularly broadcasts live coverage of Western Mustangs sports games during their regular season and playoffs, including men's and women's basketball, men's football, and men's hockey.

== History ==
=== Origins ===
Radio Western's origins date from 1959 when student politicians suggested the idea for a student-run radio station. It was not until 1971 that a group of students began broadcasting for six hours every Sunday night on CFPL-AM 980. This encouraged the Western University Students’ Council (USC) to give financial support for a closed-circuit station to be set up first in Somerville House and inside the University Community Centre. It is a member of the National Campus Radio Association, Community Radio Fund of Canada, and the Pillar Nonprofit Network.

=== 1970s ===
The station has its roots as a weekly radio show called "Radio Western" that was broadcast overnights on CFPL-FM starting in 1971. The University Students' Council subsequently launched a carrier current station, which was added to the city's cable FM service in 1978 and was available on AC radios in some university buildings at 610 kHz.

=== 1980s ===
In January 1980 the station formally organized as CHRW and applied to the Canadian Radio-television and Telecommunications Commission for an FM license, which was granted in 1981 with 50 watts at 94.7 MHz on the FM dial. The station moved to the public airwaves on October 31 of that year. Chief announcer, John R. Quain, played the station's first song, "On the Air" by Peter Gabriel. In 1987, Radio Western increased its power from 50 to 5,000 watts and decreased it from 5,000 to 3,000 watts in 1990.

=== 1990s ===
The power decrease to 3,000 watts was granted and implemented in October 31 1990, exactly 9 years after the station's first broadcast, allowing coverage of the surrounding area from Chatham to Woodstock.

=== 2000s ===
In 2000, the station was recognized for Outstanding University Sports Coverage with the Fred Sgambati Media Award.

In November 2003, the station increased power again to 6,000 watts, moving to its current frequency 94.9 FM and its tower was moved to One London Place from its previous location in the city's Cherryhill area. Radio Western can be heard across London and through several counties in Southwestern Ontario, reaching past Woodstock, St. Thomas and surrounding communities between Lake Erie and Lake Huron.

=== 2010s ===
In January 2018, the Western University Students' Council held a referendum to determine if the station was still relevant to students' funding. The vote resulted in a decrease in student tuition funding from $12 to $10.50 over a period of three years.

In November 2018, a previously unreleased recording of an interview with Kurt Cobain from 1991 was released by a former student volunteer.

=== 2020s ===
During the COVID-19 pandemic, the station transitioned to broadcasting pre-recorded shows from all hosts in accordance with Western University's lockdown procedures. Co-op and work-study opportunities were also halted for volunteers in March 2020. In September 2022, the station began to re-introduce live hosts with volunteers and staff returning to campus.

== Notable alumni ==
- Adrienne Arsenault – CBC News journalist.
- Avis Favaro – CTV News Medical Correspondent.
- Basia Bulat – Singer-songwriter whose first EP was recorded at the station in 2005 while studying English.
- Bryan Webb – Former Music director, now lead vocalist for the Constantines.
- Cameron Bailey – CEO of TIFF, volunteered at the station and The Gazette student newspaper while completing a bachelor's degree in English Literature in 1987.
- Dan Shulman – MLB sportscaster at Sportsnet and ESPN.
- Elliotte Friedman – NHL sportscaster and regular panelist on CBC Hockey Night in Canada.
- James Rocchi – Former Program Director who became an in-house film critic at Netflix, then an English teacher in Los Angeles.
- John McKenna – Volunteered as a sports commentator and wrote for student newspaper The Gazette, then went on to become Executive producer at CHCH TV in Hamilton.
- John R. Quain – Radio Western's first Chief Announcer, journalist, and current contributor for The New York Times.
- Kevin Newman – Former Global National anchor got his start in broadcasting while a student at Western, serving as the station's first News director.
- Liz Trinnear – Volunteered while studying at the Faculty of Information and Media Studies, then went on to become a VJ on MuchMusic.
- Pat Nagle – First Station Manager who then became a Senior Manager at CBC North.
- Rob Faulds – Sportscaster on Sportsnet, volunteered while studying biology and psychology.
- Stephen Brunt – Hosted a jazz show while studying journalism, before turning his attention to sports writing.
- Steve Patterson – Comedian.
- Thalia Assuras – Television journalist.
