= Tillsonburg =

- Town (lower-tier)
- Town of Tillsonburg
- Motto: Connected. Enriched. Inspired.
- Location within Southern Ontario
- Coordinates: 42°52′00″N 80°44′00″W
- Country: Canada
- Province: Ontario
- County: Oxford
- Settled: 1825 (as village)
- Incorporated: 1872 (as town)

Government
  - Governing body: Tillsonburg Town Council
  - Town Mayor: Deb Gilvesy
  - Deputy Mayor: Dave Beres
  - Councillors: List of councillors: Penny Esseltine; Chris Rosehart; Pete Luciani; Deb Gilvesy; Christopher Parker

Area
  - Land: 22.20 km^{2} (8.57 sq mi)
- Elevation: 270 m (890 ft)

Population (2021)
  - Total: 18,615
  - Density: 838.6/km^{2} (2,172/sq mi)
  - Demonym: Tillsonburger
- Time zone: UTC-5 (EST)
  - Summer (DST): UTC-4 (EDT)
- Forward sortation area: N4G
- Area codes: 519 and 226
- Website: www.tillsonburg.ca

Tillsonburg is a town in Oxford County, Ontario, Canada, with a population of 18,615 located about 50 kilometres southeast of London, on Highway 3 at the junction of Highway 19.

== History ==
Prior to European settlement, the present site of Tillsonburg was home to Indigenous tribes. The Tillsonburg Village Site, a 14th-century Iroquoian village, was excavated in 2001 and 2008, in the northwest corner of the town, and contained 15 longhouses.

George Tillson

The area was settled in 1825 by George Tillson and other immigrants from Enfield, Massachusetts. A forge and sawmill were erected and roads built which led to the establishment of this small community, originally called Dereham Forge. The settlement was on the Big Otter Creek.

In 1836 the village was renamed Tillsonburg in honour of its founder. It was also in this year that the main street, Broadway, was laid out to its full 100-foot (30 m) width. Because the village was predominantly a logging and wood product centre, the street was built to accommodate the turning of three-team logging wagons. This width is now unique to Ontario and has become a benefit toward handling the pressures of modern-day traffic by providing angled parking. The extension of Broadway north was called Plank Line and is now known as Highway 19.

The mid-19th century proved to be the first step in the industrialization of this municipality. A water system was devised to not only supply pure water for domestic use, but also to provide water power to such industries as a sawmill, planing mill, gristmill, spinning mill, pottery and a tannery. Many of these new establishments were either owned, started, or financed by George Tillson.

E. D. Tillson

In 1872 the village was incorporated as the Town of Tillsonburg, with Edwin Delevan Tillson elected as its first mayor. The Town of Tillsonburg reached a population of 2,000 in 1885, experienced its first church dedication, and had its first telephone installation established. Electric power was first used in 1912 and automobiles began to appear on the market.

In 1915, a public library was built with funds provided by the Carnegie Foundation, and the town's Memorial Hospital opened in 1925.

In the 1920s, major enterprises included milk production, manufacture of shoes, tractors, textiles and an increased production of tobacco. The Tillsonburg Livingstons basketball team (representative of Tillsonburg's largest industry) won the Canadian Championships in 1952 and represented Canada in the 1952 Summer Olympics at Helsinki, Finland. CKOT Radio began broadcasting operations in 1955 and the Ontario Flue-Cured Tobacco Marketing Board opened its new auction exchange three years later.

== Government ==
Tillsonburg is one of eight municipalities that make up the County of Oxford. The mayor also represents the town as a County Councillor. The county administers social programs, ambulance and paramedic services, planning, water and wastewater services, garbage and landfill operations and the County road system.

Tillsonburg is governed by an elected mayor, deputy mayor and five councillors. Council meets on the 2nd and 4th Mondays of each month in the Council Chambers in the Corporate Municipal Office. They oversee staff and set policy for the various operations and services provided by the town.

The town also owns and operates:

- Tillsonburg Municipal Airport
- Lake Lisgar Water Park

Oxford County now owns and operates:

- Tillsonburg Public Library

== Healthcare ==
Tillsonburg District Memorial Hospital

The town has one hospital accredited through the Ontario Ministry of Health. Tillsonburg District Memorial Hospital is in the downtown area on Rolph Street. The TDMH serves the town and region.

== Development ==
In the Town's Centennial Year (1972), the new $1,000,000 Community Recreation Complex was opened by the Governor General of Canada. The Tillsonburg Museum was also opened in the old community centre on the shores of Lake Lisgar. A new 8,000-square-foot (740 m^{2}) library was completed in 1975, and a second indoor skating rink was built in 1977, funded completely by donations from industry, commerce, service clubs, citizens and the Wintario lottery. In 1979, the hospital built a $7,000,000 addition for offices, improved x-ray and emergency departments, and an expanded Intensive Care Unit. A fire hall was constructed in 1979, replacing the old building which was demolished to make way for a downtown mall.

Tillsonburg Town Centre Mall

The controversial Tillsonburg Town Centre Mall opened in 1980, where the former Town Hall once stood. The mall, a joint effort of the town and Trottier Investments, was built primarily to meet competition from out-of-town malls and keep more of the shopping dollar in town.

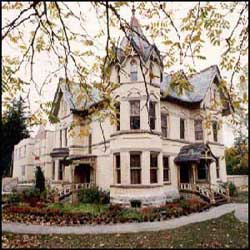
Annandale House

In 1983, two important buildings - Annandale House (built by the founding Tillson family) and the Hale Street railway station became public buildings. The former would be restored as a house museum, while the latter became The Station Arts Centre.

A residential development geared for seniors, named Hickory Hills, began selling homes in 1986. The development significantly added to the town's population and increased the pool of volunteers for local non-profit agencies.

In 1991, a food bank was established for the community's needy and continues to be operated on a volunteer basis.

Throughout the early 1990s, volunteers were also busy on the Lake Lisgar Renaissance Project, which sought to revitalize the lake, and make the park around the lake more attractive with the construction of a gazebo, water fountain and walkways into the lake.

In that period two major entertainment outlets closed: the Skylark Drive-In and the Strand movie theatre, victims of the video store arrival. The original angled marquee architecture of the Strand Theatre is still intact but the building is again unoccupied after brief stints as businesses. To the relief of many, big screen movies came back in Tillsonburg in 1996 with the opening of Broadway Cinemas.

In 1994, the downtown area was significantly enhanced with the construction of the Rotary Club Clock Tower, which incorporated a clock from the town's former Post Office, and a bell from the demolished Town Hall. Soon, it became a community tradition (sponsored by the Rotary Club) for local residents to gather at the Clock Tower to ring in the New Year with fireworks, hot apple cider and the dropping of a ball.

Further development of residential senior's focused development began in 2001 with the Baldwin Place subdivision located on the western periphery of the town. This development which is in Phase 8 will have approximately 300 homes when completed.

The Tillsonburg Community Centre was refurbished in 2004 with renovations and enlargement of the main ice surface to NHL size. The project's scope of work included keeping the whale-back roof as a key architectural feature as well as to increase seating and provide for new recreation and health club facilities.

Residential development includes the re-urbanization of the former railway lands on Bridge Street East which is the site of Tillson Landing condominium, the first such highrise construction in more than a decade.

== Industry and economy ==
Tillsonburg serves a regional tri-county area of 65,000 people at the convergence of Oxford, Elgin and Norfolk counties. The industrial base has become quite diverse during the decline of the once prominent tobacco industry. The area is home to several branch plants of major US and internationally based automotive suppliers including Autoneum Canada Ltd, THK-TRW, Marwood Metal Fabrication Ltd and a new site for Armtec. There are many service-related industries including Future Transfer Co. Inc, Inovata Foods, E & E McLaughlin, J/E Bearing Ltd., Fleetwood Metal Products, and MIL-SIM-FX International Inc.

The town has a very active and developing downtown core area which includes the Tillsonburg Town Centre mall, built in 1980 and has several big box stores.

All of the major Canadian banks have branches in the town and there is also a credit union.

The area also has a strong agricultural community with cash crops, hog farming, milk production, tobacco, ginseng and various tertiary crops (including watermelons).

The town has recently become a hub for regional operations of the Ontario Provincial Police including Oxford County Division Headquarters and also the Southwestern Ontario Forensics laboratory which opened in April 2008.

== Tourism ==
In January 2006 the National Post listed Tillsonburg as number 75 on the top 100 places to visit in Canada. Annandale House was designated a Canadian National Historic Site in 1997.

Tillsonburg is home to three barn quilts. One is on the north end of town on the side of a furniture store, shaped as a barn. Another one is on the grounds of Station Arts in front of the caboose and the third quilt is on the original Pea & Barley Mill, built in 1878 by E. D. Tillson, son of the town's founder and opened in 2009 as the Mill Tales Inn beside the Otter Creek featuring a restaurant and inn. These barn quilts make up part of the Barn Quilt Trail in Southwest Ontario.

Another attraction is the Station Arts Centre, a multi-use facility which was created from two historic train stations that were joined together by a central gallery. It has been home to artistic, cultural and technical groups since its founding in 1983. It is also home to the Saturday morning Tillsonburg Farmers' Market which operates from May to November.

A number of organizations across Tillsonburg collaborate in putting together events such as Turtlefest, the Week of Remembrance and the Tillsonburg Country Christmas Festival.

Camping is available north of town at Casey's Park on Highway #19 north of Mount Elgin, which is the home of weekly Country Music Jamborees between Victoria Day and Labour Day, where audience members are encouraged to participate on stage.

Lake Lisgar, a small lake in the centre of town, has been rehabilitated and is home for the Tillsonburg Rowing Club and the Lake Lisgar Water Park.

== Education ==
=== Elementary and secondary schools ===
Tillsonburg elementary and secondary schools are under the control of two school boards, the Thames Valley District School Board (TVDSB) and the London District Catholic School Board (LDCSB).

- Glendale High School
- Annandale Public School
- Monsignor J.H. O'Neill Catholic School
- South Ridge Public School
- St. Joseph's Catholic School
- Westfield Public School
- Rolph Street Public School (closed)
- Maple Lane Public School (closed as of 2014)

=== Special service schools ===
- Adult Basic Literacy Program: A Multi-Service Centre program, in the Livingston Centre, established: 1987. Literacy instruction is provided to any adults free of charge. Students are encouraged to purchase their books.
- Tillson Avenue Education Centre: Established: 1995. Adult Day School offering credit courses, independent learning courses, basic literacy, English as a second language (ESL) and driver education.

== Demographics ==
In the 2021 Census of Population conducted by Statistics Canada, Tillsonburg had a population of 18,615 living in 8,229 of its 8,494 total private dwellings, a change of 17.3% from its 2016 population of 15,872. With a land area of 22.2 km^{2} (8.6 sq mi), it had a population density of 838.5/km^{2} (2,171.7/sq mi) in 2021.

Census	Population
1871	1,700
1881	1,939
1891	2,163
1901	2,241
1911	2,758
1921	2,974
1931	3,385
1941	4,002
1951	5,330
1961	6,600
1971	6,608
1981	10,487
1991	12,019
2001	14,052
2006	14,822
2011	15,301
2016	15,872
2021	18,615

Tillsonburg population by age compared to Oxford County
	Tillsonburg			Oxford County		
Age	Total	Male	Female	Total	Male	Female
Total – all persons	14,820	6,995	7,830	102,755	50,460	52,295
0–4	765	380	385	5,945	3,075	2,870
5–9	750	395	355	6,510	3,305	3,210
10–14	880	435	445	7,390	3,805	3,585
15–19	870	435	430	7,275	3,685	3,590
20–24	860	445	415	6,320	3,235	3,085
25–29	825	395	430	5,500	2,755	2,740
30–34	785	390	400	6,045	3,035	3,005
35–39	875	440	435	6,645	3,300	3,345
40–44	1,020	485	540	8,395	4,120	4,275
45–49	1,070	490	585	8,105	3,970	4,140
50–54	950	445	510	7,210	3,625	3,585
55–59	890	425	465	6,425	3,195	3,225
60–64	860	385	480	5,015	2,465	2,555
65–69	805	375	430	4,265	2,045	2,220
70–74	840	365	470	3,805	1,760	2,050
75–79	735	325	415	3,280	1,450	1,830
80–84	635	260	370	2,630	1,070	1,570
85+	390	120	280	2,000	580	1,415
Median Age	43.9	41.9	45.8	39.8	38.6	40.9
% Over 15	83.9	82.7	84.9	80.7	79.8	81.5

Tillsonburg population by marital status compared to Oxford County
	Tillsonburg			Oxford County		
Marital status	Total	Male	Female	Total	Male	Female
Total – population 15 years and over	12,425	5,780	6,645	82,910	40,280	42,625
Single	3,070	1,630	1,440	22,420	12,270	10,150
Married	6,655	3,325	3,330	45,535	22,790	22,740
Separated	495	215	275	3,185	1,470	1,710
Divorced	930	370	555	5,810	2,605	3,210
Widowed	1,285	240	1,045	5,960	1,145	4,815

Tillsonburg population by language(s) understood Compared To Oxford County
	Tillsonburg			Oxford County		
Language	Total	Male	Female	Total	Male	Female
Total – all persons	14,635	6,930	7,705	101,460	50,070	51,385
English only	12,460	5,900	6,565	89,875	44,395	45,485
French only	210	90	120	1,100	495	610
Both English and French	60	10	50	95	35	55
Other languages	1,950	935	1,010	10,380	5,145	5,235

Tillsonburg population by ethnicity (2006) Compared To Oxford County
	Tillsonburg			Oxford County		
Ethnicity	Total	Male	Female	Total	Male	Female
Total – all persons	14,635	6,930	7,705	101,460	50,075	51,385
Visible minority population	585	270	315	2,555	1,320	1,230
Chinese	40	20	15	300	140	155
South Asian	20	10	10	265	125	140
Black	150	65	85	515	315	195
Filipino	10	0	10	140	65	80
Latin American	15	10	10	110	50	60
Southeast Asian	320	150	170	465	215	250
Arab	10	10	0	115	60	50
Japanese	0	0	0	230	120	110
Caucasian	14,055	6,660	7,395	98,905	48,745	50,160

== Transportation ==
=== Road ===
Though not directly on the route, Highway 401 passes close to the town, and is connected to it by Highway 19, at exit 218. Greyhound no longer has weekly bus service to and from Tillsonburg. T:GO Transit provides weekday local bus service. Out-of-town bus service by T:GO Transit to Woodstock, Ingersoll, and other neighbouring communities was shut down due to lack of funding on April 1, 2025.

=== Rail ===
The Town of Tillsonburg rail service had been served by the St. Thomas & Eastern Railway, a division of Trillium Railway, which ran in most cases parallel to Highway 3 in the south end of the town on the former Canadian National Railway Cayuga subdivision, previously the Great Western Railway's Canada Air Line. Service on the STER was daily, Monday to Friday, but ceased operation in 2013. However, GIO Rail resumed service on January 4, 2022.

The Ontario Southland Railway also serves Tillsonburg using the former CPR Port Burwell subdivision running from nearby Ingersoll, parallel to Highway 19 north of town, and then into the north-east end of town. The OSR interchanges with the STER at the south end of town.

Passenger train services are provided by Via Rail stations in nearby Ingersoll or Woodstock.

=== Air ===
The town is served by the Tillsonburg Municipal Airport, owned and operated by the Town of Tillsonburg. The airport is 7 km north of the town in Southwest Oxford Township. The airport is home to several aviation-related businesses. The airport has 3 runways, with the primary runway being re-constructed and extended to 5,500 feet, constructed of asphalt. Its terminal building houses a flying school and has a cafe, lounge, patio and viewing area. The airport is used by corporate aircraft including jets. Regular users of the airport also include the Canadian Harvard Aircraft Association, Air Ambulance, Canadian Coast Guard, the Ontario Provincial Police and other government agencies.

== Recreation ==
- Curling is available at the Tillsonburg Curling Club
- The Bridges at Tillsonburg is an 18-hole golf course south of town
- Lake Lisgar is home to the Lake Lisgar Water Park which is open from Father's Day to Labour Day.
- The Tillsonburg Senior Centre, located at the Tillsonburg Community Centre Complex, offers more than 30 activities including 8 different card games, a variety of fitness and yoga classes, vibrant arts programs, seminars, cooking classes and seasonal activities.
- The Tillsonburg Community Centre Complex offers a variety of recreation programs, including hockey and ringette. It has two rinks and a mini practice rink, swimming pool, baseball diamonds, skate park, racquet courts and other facilities.
- The Tillsonburg Thunder of the Western Ontario Athletic Association Senior Hockey League, play at the Memorial Arena located at the Tillsonburg Community Centre Complex.
- The Tillsonburg Soccer Park has a land area of 14 acres (57,000 m^{2}). Opened in 2000, this facility draws regional tournaments and players from across the region. The park also includes a full clubhouse with meeting and catering facilities.

== Media ==
=== Radio ===
Frequency	Call sign	Branding	Format	Owner	Notes
FM 88.7	CBCL-FM-1	CBC Radio One	Talk radio, public radio	Canadian Broadcasting Corporation	Rebroadcaster of CBCL-FM (London)
FM 101.3	CKOT-FM	Giant FM 101.3	Classic rock	My Broadcasting Corporation	
FM 107.3	CJDL-FM	Country 107.3	Country music	My Broadcasting Corporation	

=== Newspapers ===
- The Tillsonburg News, a bi-weekly newspaper, first published in 1863

== Neighbourhoods ==
- Annandale Heights
- Baldwin Place: Modelled largely after the successful Hickory Hills subdivision, this neighbourhood also features one-storey homes.
- Broadway Acres: A neighbourhood immediately adjacent to Broadway with homes built as far back as the 1960s.
- Brookside: One of the newer areas located off Quarterline Road near the Tillsonburg Soccer Park. This area of larger single-family homes has recently been connected with Broadway Acres via the long-awaited extension of Glendale Drive. Monsignor O'Neill and Glendale High School are located nearby.
- Cadman Subdivision
- Claron Heights
- Georgian Heights
- Glenridge
- Hickory Hills: The first of the retirement subdivisions in the town. Planned in the late 1980s this neighbourhood has quaint small homes, all one-storey with attached garages. The residents have their own residents association and community centre.
- The Oakes: New area located off Quarterline Road just South of the Tillsonburg Soccer park.
- Park Place
- Riva Ridge
- Riverview
- Rolling Meadows: also was annexed by the Town of Tillsonburg in the 1970s and features larger homes on sizeable lot frontages. This neighbourhood is in the north end of town with convenient access to Highway #19.
- South Ridge
- Trottier Subdivision
- VanNorman Drive
- Westmount: Originally part of the former Township of Dereham, this neighbourhood boasts a large park and homes spread out over very large lots dating back to 1970.
- Woodhaven
- Woodland Estates

== Notable people ==
- Lloyd Andrews, played for the Toronto St. Patricks from 1921–1925 and won the Stanley Cup
- Shirley Barrie, playwright and winner of a Dora Mavor Moore Award
- Charlotte Bolton, para-athlete
- Jeff Bes, won gold medal at the 1993 World Junior Ice Hockey Championships, drafted by the Minnesota North Stars. Played in the Central Hockey League
- Colin Campbell, former National Hockey League (NHL) player, and former vice-president of hockey operations of the NHL. An arena commemorating Campbell is located at the Tillsonburg Community Centre
- Gregory Campbell, former NHL player, won the Stanley Cup with the Boston Bruins in 2011
- Bill Coulthard, basketball player, competed for Canada at the 1952 Summer Olympics
- Michael DeGroote, billionaire, member of the Order of Canada
- Johnny Cowell, Canadian trumpeter and composer. He wrote the song "Walk Hand in Hand" which has been recorded over 90 times, making him one of Canada's most successful songwriters.
- Debra DiGiovanni, comedian, Canadian Comedy Award winner
- Gary Green, hockey coach and broadcaster, was the youngest head coach in NHL history with the Washington Capitals
- Anne Harris, renowned Canadian Sculptor
- Tillson Harrison, physician, army officer and adventurer, also known for his humanitarian work in China.
- Harley Hotchkiss, executive with the Calgary Flames, member of the Order of Canada, member of the Hockey Hall of Fame
- Gerry Livingston, philanthropist in the areas of sport and social services and sponsor of Canada's Olympic male basketball teams in 1952 and 1960. He received Papal honours in 1962 and died in 1988. The Livingston Centre was named in his honour. He also founded the Multi-Service Centre.
- Christopher Mabee, silver medalist at the 2007 Canadian Figure Skating Championships
- Kevin Matisyn, lead vocalist for the alternative rock band Parabelle, former lead vocalist for the Juno-nominated rock band Evans Blue.
- Dave Moylan, former ice hockey defenceman, won the silver medal at the 1986 World Junior Ice Hockey Championships, drafted in 1985 by the Buffalo Sabres
- Austin Pasztor, football player, played for Virginia in the NCAA, and in the NFL for several teams as an offensive lineman
- David Rokeby, artist, awarded the Governor General's Award
- Jay Triano, the first Canadian-born coach in the NBA, former head coach of the Toronto Raptors. He captained Canada's basketball team at the 1984 and 1988 Olympics.
- Shawn Tompkins, long time Mixed Martial Arts trainer.
- Evan VanMoekerke- was a member of Canada's Olympic team for the 2016 Summer Olympics in Rio where he competed in the 4 x 100 m freestyle relay. Evan also won a silver at the 2015 Pan American Games in the 4 x 100 m freestyle relay.

== Popular culture ==
Stompin' Tom Connors and The Cash Brothers have each written and recorded songs entitled "Tillsonburg".

== Historical churches ==
- Avondale Zion United Church: 62 Harvey St. Designated a Heritage Building on June 19, 1981, this neo-Gothic white brick church is the oldest religious structure in Tillsonburg. The congregation was established in 1849. The current church was the result of a union between a Methodist and Presbyterian Church in 1925.
- Bethel Temple: 119 Bidwell St. The congregation was established in 1939.
- Church of Christ, Tillsonburg: 204244 Keswick Rd.
- Church of Jesus Christ of Latter Day Saints: 19 Rid out S W
- Crosspoint Community Church: 150 Concession St W. The congregation was established in 1977 and was originally call Tillsonburg Christian Reformed Church.
- First Baptist Church: 101 Bidwell St. The congregation was established in 1853.
- Harvest Time Christian Fellowship: 115 Queen St.
- New Hope Baptist Church: Highway 3 and Greenline Rd. The congregation was established in 1985.
- North Broadway Baptist Church: 6 North St. E. The congregation was established in 1939.
- The Salvation Army: 110 Concession St W. The congregation was established in 1884.
- St. Andrew's Presbyterian Church: 48 Bock St W. The congregation was established in 1849.
- St. John's Anglican Church: 46 Ridout St. A church was built and dedicated in 1868, but burned down in 1870. A new building was erected in 1872. A time capsule was opened 100 years after its placement near the cornerstone in 1899. A new 100-year time capsule containing some of the original documents has been stored in the same location.
- St. Luke's Lutheran Church: 14 Glendale Dr. The congregation was established in 1948.
- St. Mary's Roman Catholic Church: 51 Venison St. W. Built in 1932.
- St. Paul's United Church: 34 Ridout St W. The congregation was established in 1867. The current building was erected in 1913.
- Tillsonburg Bible Chapel: 63 Queen St. Built in 1920.
- Tillsonburg Free Methodist Church: 44 Tillson Ave. The congregation was established in 1883.

== Historical schools ==
- Rolph Street P.S.: The first school was built in 1866 and the current building opened in 1912.
- St. Mary's C.S.: 131 Rolph St. Built in 1949.

== Historical/architectural resources ==
- Annandale House: 30 Tillson Ave. Annandale National Historic Site is one of the finest examples of the Aesthetic Art Movement, a Victorian style which utilized colour, decorative detail, and nature. Constructed in the 1880s for E. D. Tilson, the first mayor of Tillsonburg, Annandale NHS provides the opportunity to tour a restored period mansion and changing local history exhibits.
- Leachman Residence: 94 Rolph St. This Italianate-style house, with its rounded windows and eyebrow surrounds was built in 1876.
- Private Residence: 41 King St. Like many other buildings in Tillsonburg, this house was constructed of locally formed white brick. Decorative gingerbread under the eaves matches the gingerbread trim on the corner oriel windows.
- Private Residence: 101 Rolph St. This two storey Gothic-style house was built in 1880. Bay window projections on the front and side of the house combine with the striking two storey porch to create an inviting exterior. Of note are the wooden shutters that are shaped to fit each curved window.
- St. Paul's United Church Manse: 38 Ridout St. W. This two and a half storey house was built in 1870 as the manse for the adjacent United Church. The front facade presents an interesting combination of features with its delicate gingerbread in the gable, small dentil trim under the eaves, and rough stone window surrounds.
- Vivian House: 300 Broadway St. From the slate roof to the decorative stained glass, stylish gingerbread and detail work under the eaves, trim on the two storey porch, and unique keyhole window on a side elevation, this house is a wonderful example of Victorian elegance.
- T.W Gibson Residence:280 Broadway. In 1909 T.W Gibson started construction of a fine new brick residence which still stands as a stately home along Tillsonburg's tree-lined main street.

== Plaques and monuments ==
- Memorial Wall: 170 Broadway St. Plaque located in the Town Centre Mall. It memorializes various citizens' achievements.
- Tillsonburg Cenotaph: 170 Broadway St. The Cenotaph is located in the Town Centre Mall. This memorial is dedicated to Tillsonburg men and women who served in World Wars I and II.
- Rotary Clock Tower: 41 Bridge St W. Located at the corner of Bridge St and Broadway St. The clock came from the old Post Office, and the bell from the old Town Hall. The Tower is surrounded by memorial paving stones, engraved with the names of various prominent members of the community, as well as those designated by donors.

== Cultural resources ==
- Great Western Railway Station: 41 Bridge St W. at corner of Bidwell St. The typical station roof lines of this building disclose its busy past. Note the spelling of Tilsonburg, with only one "l". The Baggage Room Gift Shop and Gallery, located in the former railway station, is operated by the Station Arts Centre. This train station was joined to the Lake Erie & Pacific Railway Station by adding the Changing Exhibit Gallery. Visitor Information site with brochures and maps for Ontario plus a computer kiosk was added in summer of 2013 for both tourist information and services for the Town of Tillsonburg.
- Theatre Tillsonburg: 14789 Potters Rd. Built in 1961. This is the former Hungarian Cultural Centre and was converted to a theatre in 1990.
- Tillson Pea and Barley Mill: 20 John Pound Rd. Originally an agricultural mill built in 1878, this three storey structure underwent a major reconstruction and reopened as The Mill Tales Inn and restaurant.
- Tillsonburg Lake Erie & Pacific Railway Station: 41 Bridge St W. Originally located on King St, but moved to its present location on Bridge St. in 1992. A gallery was built to join the original train station with this one. The two stations illustrate two distinct styles of railway station architecture. The Station Arts Centre is located in this building. Also home of the Farmers Market open from spring to Thanksgiving.
- Tillsonburg Public Library: 2 Library Lane. The Tillsonburg Public Library at Broadway and Washington Grand was built in 1974 replacing a Carnegie Library from 1915 built on the same site. The library joined the Oxford County library system on January 1, 2013 and the building has undergone a major renovation and re-opened on July 29, 2013. A mural of the former Carnegie Library is painted inside the library by local artist Ches Sulkowski. Two more murals are planned of the former Town Hall and one picturing a tobacco farm. The front of the building includes a paved area, with a paving stone for each of the Citizens of the Year designated by the Tillsonburg Chamber of Commerce. The stones begin with Harry Ostander, 1978. Each year, another stone is added for the current Citizen of the Year. Library Lane is also a paved area, with some memorial stones added as requested by donors. A plaque commemorates the founding of Tillsonburg and its founder, George Tillson, 1782-1864. This community, known as the Dereham Forge, grew around the sawmill and foundry that Tillson established. Plaque- Tillsonburg Public Library, 1975, plaque inside the building lists the library board, contractors and architects.

== Natural areas and parks ==
- Coronation Park: Van St. 8 ha (20 acres) of parkland.
- Lake Lisgar Water Park: 45 Hardy Ave. Plaque - a plaque commemorating Barbara Ann Scott, Canadian gold medalist figure skater in the 1950s. Plaque- In memory of Donald M. Gimbson, a prominent and community minded citizen who served as chairman of the parks and recreation commission and was instrumental in developing Tillsonburg's recreation facilities.
- Memorial Park: Ross T. Dixie Tribe Park. Plaque - The Dixie Tribe Memorial Park plaque was presented to the Town of Tillsonburg by H.M. Tribe Trumpour in memory of her son Dixie Tribe, 1941.
- VanNorman Memorial Park: A plaque to commemorate the VanNorman family, co-founders of the Town of Tillsonburg in the year 1825.Tillsonburg Tri-County Agricultural Society - a plaque for the Ontario Department of Agriculture presented this plaque in honour of J.M. Climie and in recognition of one hundred years of service by the Society on August 29, 1961.
- ParticiPark: 41 Bridge St W. 10ha (25 acres) of parkland along Stoney Creek.
- Tillsonburg Conservation Area: Simcoe T 27 Hyman. Passive recreation. Part of the Long Point Region Conservation Authority.
