= RIV =

RIV may refer to:

== Anatomy and Medicine ==
- Right innominate vein
- Recombinant influenza vaccine

== Military aviation ==
- March Air Reserve Base, a U.S. Air Reserve base in Riverside County, California, by IATA airport code
- Fieseler Fi 103R Reichenberg, a model of late-World War II German bomber aircraft
- Siemens-Schuckert R.IV, a bomber aircraft built in Germany during World War I
- Zeppelin-Staaken R.IV, a bomber aircraft built in Germany during World War I

== Transport ==
- Registrar of Imported Vehicles, Canada
- Regolamento Internazionale Veicoli, the International Wagon Regulations for European rail freight wagons
- Riversdale railway station, Australia, station code RIV
- Riverside–Downtown station, California, United States, Amtrak station code RIV
- Riviera MRT/LRT station, Punggol, Singapore, station abbreviation RIV

== Other uses ==
- Augustus Quirinus Rivinus (1652–1723), German physician and botanist, with standard author abbreviation "Riv."
- Riv or Rov (river), a 104-km tributary of the Southern Bug, in Ukraine
- Rapid intervention vehicle, a type of airport crash tender vehicle
- Residual income valuation, an approach to equity valuation
- Riversdale Mining, Australian Securities Exchange symbole RIV
- Riverside International Raceway, a former automobile race course in Riverside, California
- Riviera (hotel and casino), nicknamed "the Riv", Las Vegas, Nevada, United States
- Rivaan, nicknamed "The Riv", New York City home for the Royal Rooters of Red Sox Nation, a fan club for the Boston Red Sox
