= CIXX-FM =

Radio station in London, Ontario

Coordinates: 43°00′47″N 81°11′59″W

- London, Ontario; Canada
- Frequency: 106.9 MHz
- Branding: 106.9 The X

Programming
- Format: Campus Radio/Rhythmic Top 40

Ownership
- Owner: Radio Fanshawe Inc.

History
- First air date: October 31, 1978
- Call sign meaning: Station branded as "6X-FM"

Technical information
- Class: A
- ERP: 3 kW
- HAAT: 38 meters (125 ft)

Links
- Webcast: Listen Live
- Website: 1069thex.com

CIXX-FM is a Canadian radio station, broadcasting at 106.9 FM in London, Ontario. It is licensed as a community-based campus radio station by the Canadian Radio-television and Telecommunications Commission (CRTC), and airs a rhythmic top 40 format featuring hip-hop, R&B and dance hits.

CIXX broadcasts at an effective radiated power of 3 kW from Fanshawe College's "M" building, which effectively covers the City of London and some areas outside the city.

The station is operated and programmed by students in Fanshawe College's School of Contemporary Media. Radio Broadcasting students work in on-air announcing, talk programming, writing, production, music programming, sales, and promotions. News stories, full interviews, images, events and contests are all placed on the station's website.

Multimedia - Journalism students operate under the title "XFM News" and provide newscasts for the station. These students work through three different rotations each semester. They are required to either be a Reporter, Newscaster, or Podcast Producer. On the reporting rotation students are required to attend events and conduct one-on-one interviews to help produce one local story each day. As a Newscaster each student takes turns broadcasting at the top of the hour mixing local, national, and international stories using Newsroom software. As a Podcast Producer students cover a topic in depth for the station's Almost 107 show. The episodes are normally between 16-18 minutes in length.

When the station was branded as 6XFM during the late 1990s and early 2000s, students of the Radio Broadcasting program from Fanshawe College would rotate as hosts of weekly live-to-air broadcasts from various bars and nightclubs throughout the City of London.

== Notes ==
Fanshawe College also operates three other radio stations:

- CFRL Radio
- The Falcon
