= CBCL-FM =

Radio station in London, Ontario, Canada

- London, Ontario; Canada
- Broadcast area: Southwestern Ontario
- Frequency: 93.5 MHz

Programming
- Language: English
- Format: News/Talk
- Network: CBC Radio One

Ownership
- Owner: Canadian Broadcasting Corporation

History
- First air date: 1978 (as a rebroadcaster); 1998 (as an independent station)
- Call sign meaning: Canadian Broadcasting Corporation London

Technical information
- Licensing authority: CRTC
- Class: C1
- ERP: 69.3 kW average 100 kW peak Horizontal polarization only
- HAAT: 231.2 metres (759 ft)
- Transmitter coordinates: 42°57′20″N 81°21′19″W

Links
- Webcast: Listen Live
- Website: CBC London

CBCL-FM is a Canadian radio station in London, Ontario, broadcasting at 93.5 FM.

It is the city's CBC Radio One station. Their studio is located in downtown London in the Central branch of the London Public Library while its transmitter is located near Byron in West London.

== History ==
The station was launched in 1978. Prior to its launch, CBC Radio programming was aired on private affiliate CFPL. CBCL started out as a rebroadcaster of CBL Toronto, but was granted a separate licence in 1998. It began producing a limited amount of local programming, consisting of its own regional news service. From 1998-2004 it produced its own local newscasts which aired during Ontario Morning, separately from regional news heard on all other stations airing Ontario Morning. The two news feeds were merged in 2004. Regional news originating from London was hosted by Gary Ennett or Kerry McKee.

In September 2011, the CBC announced plans to expand CBCL's local programming for the London area beginning in 2012, though the new local programming scheme did not leave the planning stage at this time.

On October 24, 2013, the CBC submitted an application to the CRTC to add a new FM transmitter at Tillsonburg at 88.7 MHz, which was approved by the CRTC on March 7, 2014. The Tillsonburg transmitter signed on July 9, 2015 at 88.7 FM with the call sign CBCL-FM-1.

In 2015, Here & Now originating from CBLA-FM Toronto was replaced with a new regional afternoon drive program, Afternoon Drive, based at CBEW-FM Windsor with contributors based in London.

On April 25, 2016, the CBC announced that it had plans to launch a new morning show for London, London Morning, as well as establish special digital-based programming for the region. To that end, a new studio was built at the London Public Library's Central branch in the Downtown Core and it began operations on June 12, 2017 with London Morning's premiere, with Rebecca Zandbergen as the program's original host. In addition, Afternoon Drive was moved from Windsor to London, with a new host, Chris dela Torre. Gary Ennett and Alessio Donnini serve as news editors and news readers for the morning and afternoon shows respectively.

== Local programming ==
As of June 2017, CBCL produces the local morning program, London Morning, which covers London and the surrounding area, and the local afternoon program, Afternoon Drive, which covers all of Southwestern Ontario from London to Windsor. London Morning is hosted by Chris Ensing, and Afternoon Drive is hosted by Matt Allen. In addition, the station also produces short news updates at the 30-minute mark of selected hours of national/provincial programming throughout the weekday, in addition to a noon broadcast, concluding with a slightly longer version at around 6:26 PM after the nationwide broadcast of CBC's main evening news show, Your World Tonight.

The station previously aired the regional morning program, Ontario Morning, produced by CBLA and airing on nearly all Radio One rebroadcasters in Southern Ontario. Prior to 2015, it aired CBLA's afternoon program Here and Now, but in that year Here and Now was replaced with Afternoon Drive. The latter show was previously produced at Windsor's CBEW, but moved to London at the same time as the launch of London Morning.

== Rebroadcasters ==
City of licence	Identifier	Frequency	Power	Class	RECNet	CRTC Decision	Notes
Tillsonburg	CBCL-FM-1	88.7 FM	8,180 watts	B1	Query	2014-106	42°52′18.12″N 80°44′8.16″W

On February 2, 2015, the CRTC approved the CBC's application to relocate the transmitter site, changing the class from B1 to A, decreasing the maximum effective radiated power (ERP) from 8,180 to 1,320 watts (average ERP from 2,060 to 1,320 watts), and changing the antenna's radiation pattern from directional to non-directional; and decreasing the height of antenna above average terrain from 78.9 to 3.5 metres.
