= Bill Coulthard =

American-born Canadian basketball player

William Sanderson Coulthard (December 29, 1923 – December 18, 2005) was a Canadian basketball player who competed in the 1952 Summer Olympics. He was born in Buffalo, New York.

Coulthard was a member of the Tillsonburg Livingstons basketball team which won the Senior Canadian Championships in 1952 and made up the bulk of the 1952 Canadian Olympic basketball team in Helsinki. The Canadian basketball team was eliminated after the group stage in the 1952 tournament. He played all six matches.

In 2013, he was inducted into the Canada Basketball Hall of Fame.
