= CFHK-FM =

Radio station in St. Thomas, Ontario, Canada

Coordinates: 42°56′58.92″N 81°15′51.84″W

- St. Thomas, Ontario; Canada
- Broadcast area: Southwestern Ontario
- Frequency: 103.1 MHz
- Branding: Fresh 103.1

Programming
- Format: Hot adult contemporary (January-November); Christmas music(November-December)

Ownership
- Owner: Corus Entertainment; (Corus Premium Television Ltd.)
- Sister stations: CFPL, CFPL-FM, CKDK-FM

History
- First air date: May 14, 1948
- Former call signs: CHLO
- Former frequencies: 680 kHz (1948–1974); 1570 kHz (1970s–1994)
- Call sign meaning: From previous "Hawk" brand

Technical information
- Class: C1
- ERP: 22,000 watts average 60,000 watts peak
- HAAT: 179.6 metres (589 ft)

Links
- Website: 1031freshradio.ca

CFHK-FM is a Canadian radio station licensed to St. Thomas, Ontario, serving London and Southwestern Ontario. The station transmits at an effective radiated power of 22,000 watts (60,000 watts peak) at 103.1 MHz. Owned by Corus Entertainment, the station broadcasts a hot adult contemporary format branded as Fresh 103.1. Its studios and offices are located in downtown London while its transmitter is located on the CFPL-DT tower in Southwest London.

== History ==
CFHK was originally CHLO, an AM station broadcasting on 680 kHz and with studios in St. Thomas, Ontario. In 1963, Rogers Radio Broadcasting Limited wanted to relocate the frequency of its Toronto station, CHFI, from 1540, which is a clear-channel frequency assigned to stations in the United States and the Bahamas, and as thus, CHFI was authorized to broadcast only during the daytime. Rogers selected 680 as the new frequency, which at that time was occupied by CHLO. In the late 1960s, an agreement was reached enabling CHFI to commence 24-hour broadcasting on 680, while sharing the frequency with CHLO; eventually, CHLO would relocate to 1570 in the 1970s. CHLO had a Top 40 music format during the 1960s into the 70s, and was a Music of Your Life station in the mid-1980s. After a number of years as a country station, CHLO moved to the FM band in 1994, changing its calls to CFHK-FM. CFHK, known on-air as The Hawk, had a modern rock format, which later evolved into classic rock. The station continued to operate out of St. Thomas until the late 1990s.

Shaw Communications bought the station in August 2000, with Shaw’s radio assets being reorganized into Corus Entertainment the following month.

On January 12, 2000, CFHK joined the "Energy Radio" network, while The Hawk moved to co-owned CKDK in Woodstock. The Energy Radio network was unstable and station branding changed frequently. In 2002, the network was discontinued, with CFHK becoming locally programmed again as Energy 103, serving only London and surrounding area.

In August 2004, Energy Radio changed formats to its current Adult Top 40 format to go up against adult contemporary station CIQM-FM and adult hits station CHST-FM. The flip to hot AC was caused by previous hot AC station CHST-FM flipping to "Bob FM" in July 2003. On August 22, 2005, CFHK rebranded as 103.1 Fresh FM. The morning program featuring "D, Mindy & Gord" moved from co-owned CFPL-FM to launch the new brand. At the same time, Corus was bought out by Canwest.

In February 2011, Mindy Williamson was let go from Fresh Mornings, as the radio station apparently indicated they were moving in another direction. D (Darrin Laidman) and Gord remained as morning show hosts for a while longer. Fresh Mornings hosts are now Mark LeBel, Kim Woodbridge and Ian. Williamson is at CKLO-FM with the Stax morning show and D. is now morning host at CING-FM in Hamilton.

By September 2010, CIQM flipped to hot adult contemporary from its longtime adult contemporary format, competing with CFHK. By August 2012, CIQM flipped to Top 40/CHR, leaving CFHK as the only Hot AC station again in London. This was to fill the void left by the pre-2004 CFHK.

On December 11, 2013, Corus Radio received CRTC approval to change the authorized contours of CFHK, as well as its class from B to C1, plus increasing the average effective radiated power (ERP) from 16,700 watts to 22,000 watts (maximum ERP from 50,000 watts to 60,000 watts), increasing the effective height of the antenna above average terrain (HAAT) from 150 metres to 179.6 metres, and relocating the transmission site from its current location, on Elgin County Road 30 at Truman Line north of St. Thomas, to its new location on CFPL-DT's tower in London. The station will broadcast directionally towards the north and south, to protect other stations on or first-adjacent to CFHK, including WQUS Lapeer, Michigan, CKCI-FM Sarnia, and CKLH-FM Hamilton. On April 1, 2016, as part of a corporate re-organization, Shaw Media was merged into Shaw's sister company, Corus Entertainment. Shortly thereafter, CFHK received a new look and a new "103.1" logo.

In late December 2020, CFHK slightly rebranded as Fresh 103.1 with a new logo and slogan "Today's Best Music".
