= Registrar of Imported Vehicles =

The Registrar of Imported Vehicles (RIV) is a program started by Transport Canada, and contracted to Livingston International Inc., to help regulate Canada Motor Vehicle Safety Standards on vehicles being imported from the U.S. into Canada.

The program, which came into effect October 1, 2000, requires all vehicles newer than 15 years old being imported into Canada to meet Canadian vehicle safety specifications. Reasons for the RIV program being put into place include Canadian safety standards (for bumpers, child tether anchorage systems, daytime running lights, and passive seatbelt restraint systems specifically) being significantly stricter than the Federal Motor Vehicle Safety Standard used in the United States.

RIV Certification label for a vehicle imported from the US

The RIV program also requires anyone importing a vehicle into Canada to pay a RIV fee of $295+GST CAD (and QST if being imported into Quebec).

The enforcement of the RIV program added some level of complexity to the vehicle importation process, and the manner of operation of the Registrar of Imported Vehicles has recently been brought into question. For example, decisions of the Registrar of Imported Vehicles regarding the acceptability of any and all documents presented to them cannot be appealed to any body.

A class action lawsuit was filed in Ontario Superior Court on Feb. 26, 2008 which alleges that Transport Canada (through the Registrar of Imported Vehicles), Mercedes, BMW and Canada Border Services Agency have violated the Competition Act in regard to people who are importing American vehicles into Canada. The suit alleges the automakers and the government violated competition and consumer protection laws by forcing Canadians to pay excessive fees, ranging in the thousands of dollars, for unnecessary vehicle modifications and approvals on cars imported from the U.S.
