= London Public Library =

Library system in London, Ontario, Canada

Coordinates: 42°59′11.8″N 81°14′41.3″W

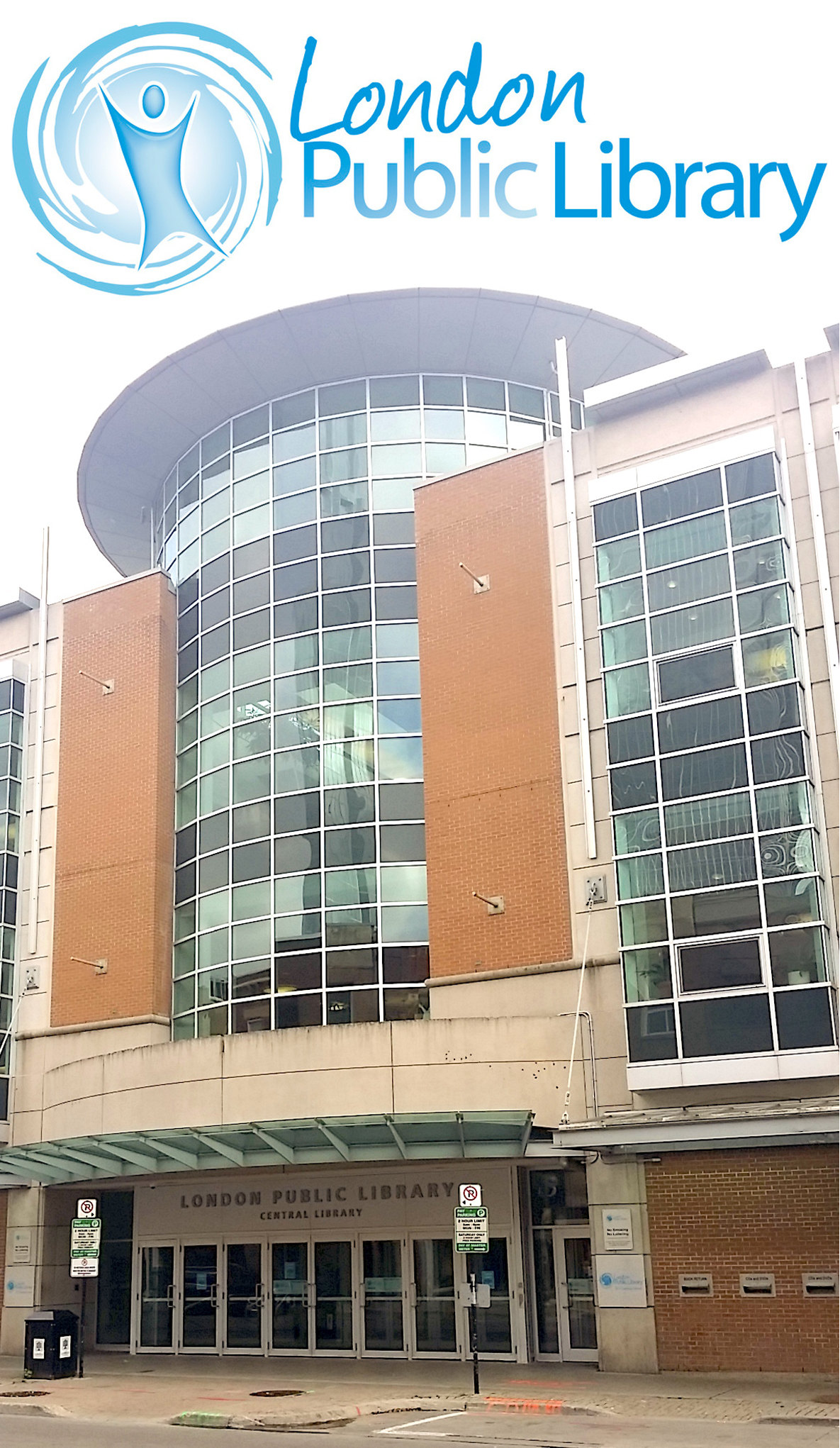
- Location: London, Ontario - Central Branch: 251 Dundas Street, Canada
- Established: 1896
- Branches: 16

Collection
- Items collected: business directories, phone books, maps, government publications, books, periodicals, genealogy, local history

Access and use
- Circulation: 3,869,642 items borrowed 4,012,731 website visits
- Population served: 2,737,988 annual visits

Other information
- Budget: $20,117,983
- Director: Michael Ciccone (CEO & Chief Librarian)
- Employees: 223
- Website: London Public Library Webpage and Catalogue

The London Public Library (LPL) is the public library system of London, Ontario, Canada. All 16 locations city-wide offer services and programs for adults, teens and children residing in London and the surrounding counties of Oxford, Middlesex, and Elgin. The branches includes art exhibits, author readings, a summer reading program, and health-oriented activities. As of November 26, 2020, the London Public Library does not charge fines for overdue materials.

== Services ==
LPL provides many services to its patrons, such as the following:

- Information and reference services to assist patrons in locating specific library materials
- Community resources (connecting patrons to community partners who may meet the specific needs of the patron)
- Internet access (through library computer stations and WiFi)
- Reader's advisory services for read-alike suggestions
- Programming for children, teens and adults (such as book clubs, activities, and discussion groups)
- Visiting Library Services (delivery of library materials to homebound patrons or branches where they can be easily picked from by family/friends)
- Interlibrary Loans (ILLO) for materials not available at LPL but found in another library system outside of it
- Book Club in a Bag (a bag with 10 copies of a book selected from over 200 titles for private book clubs)

== Borrowing - Memberships, Limitations, and Fines ==
In order to borrow materials from the library, both physically and electronically, a membership is needed to the London Public Library. The library card provides access to materials at any of the 16 branches in the city, as well as access to many digital resources through the library's website.

- Library cards are free to all London and area (Oxford, Middlesex, and Elgin County) residents, excluding Woodstock
- Paid subscription membership cards are available to those who live outside of the areas mentioned above (monthly and yearly options available)

Borrowing privileges are as follows:

- A maximum of 60 items may be signed out to a patron at a time
- A maximum of 20 DVDs may be signed out at a time (included within the 60-item limit)
- A 3-item card, as well as a "Computer Only" card are possible in special scenarios
- Most items can be borrowed for three weeks and renewed up to three times, provided there are no holds on them for other patrons
- Quickpicks, adult magazines, and feature films may only be signed out for one week, with no renewals allowed on Quickpicks due to their popular demand
- In November 2020, the London Public Library went fine-free fine-free. No fines are charged for overdue items. Unless they've been requisitioned by other users, items are automatically renewed three times; after that, the user is charged for replacement of the unreturned item.

Materials which can be borrowed include:

- Books (fiction, non-fiction, graphic novels, dual language and international languages, etc.)
- Audiobooks, books in mp3 format
- DVDs and CDs
- Newspapers and Magazines
- Board Games
- Wireless Hotspots*
- Laptops*

*Wireless Hotspots and Laptops must be returned within the seven-day loan period to ensure charges for the device are not applied to account.

== Programs ==
In addition to over 140 scheduled programs, the LPL offers year-round programming as well. Some these programs include:

- Book a Librarian - offers individual, 1-on-1 help for anyone seeking to learn how to use the library and/or library resources for their research. One hour sessions are available in person (or by phone or email arrangement) at the branches, with a maximum of two sessions/person each month. In the first year of this pilot program in 2015, over 220 "Book a Librarian" sessions took place.
- Library Settlement Partnership - multilingual LSP workers assist newcomers with information regarding housing, immigration, and healthcare at Jalna and Beacock locations
- The Welcome Centre - in June 2017, the LPL in partnership with the Canadian Mental Health Association, began an outreach program that sees two mental health workers hosting a table on the 3rd floor of the Central branch every Wednesday from 9:30am-5pm.

== Economic impact ==
Based on an economic impact model developed by the Martin Prosperity Institute, the London Public Library estimates that for every dollar invested, Londoners receive $6.68 in value. In total, the LPL creates over $102 million in total economic impact for the city each year.

== History ==
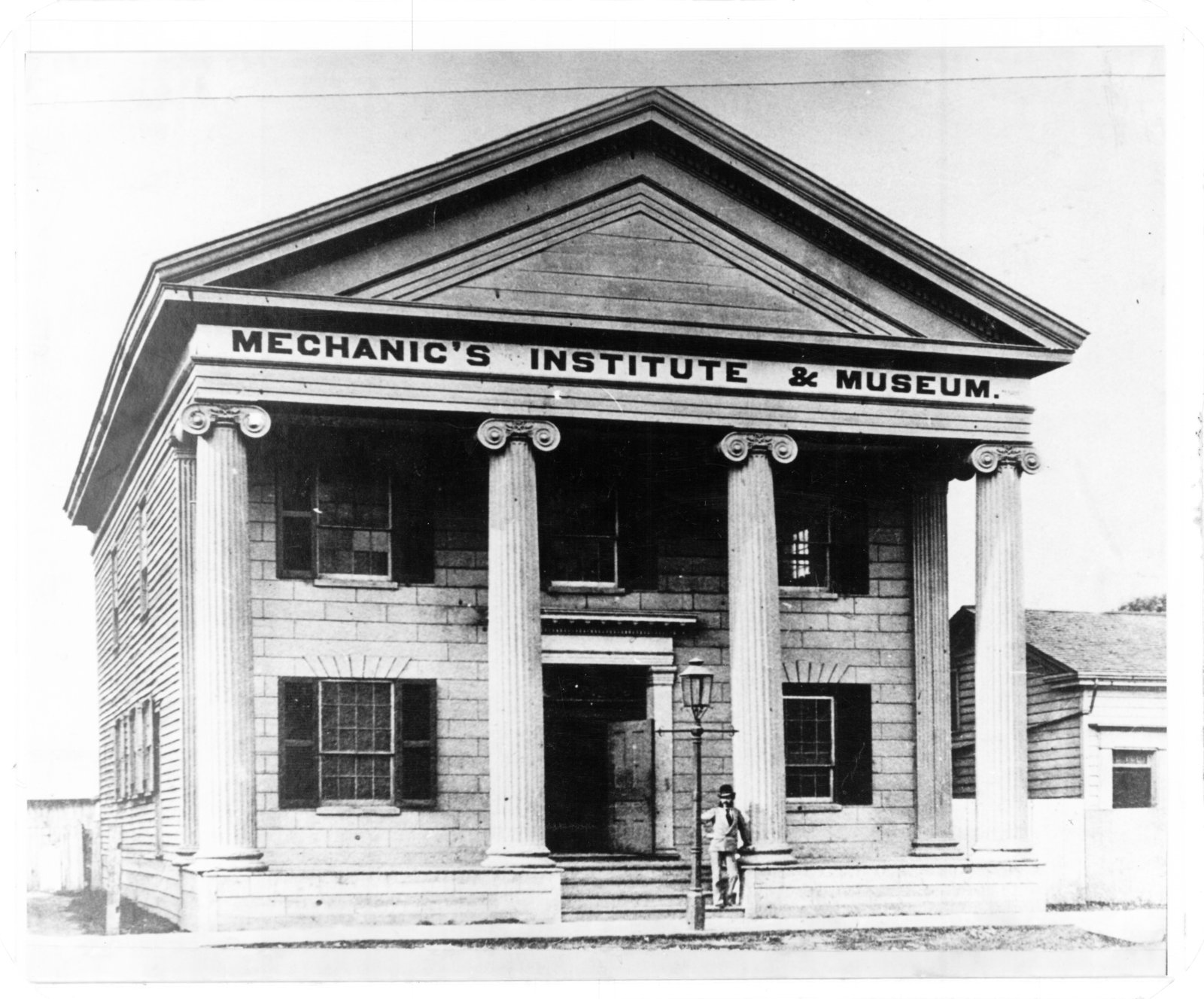
The Mechanics Institute in London, Ontario c. 1860-1877

London Mechanics' Institute was one of a series of Mechanic's Institutes that were set up around the world after becoming popular in Britain. It housed a subscription library that allowed members who paid a fee to borrow books. The Mechanic's Institutes libraries eventually became public libraries when the establishment of free libraries occurred.

The London Public Library opened in November 1896. The present-day Central Library was built in a remodelled space that formerly housed a Hudson's Bay outlet. The Central library opened in this location on August 25, 2002. This not only allowed for an economical expansion of the branch, but also offered the library a more central location in the city's downtown core. Additional outside donations enabled the construction of the Wolf Performance Hall, a concert hall which hosts music and theatre performances. The Central Library is also home to the Reading Garden which is equipped with seating and multiple water features.

From 2016 to 2017, the Central Branch was extensively renovated, its first major overhaul since it moved into CitiPlaza. As part of this renovation, a portion of the branch's northern section was remodelled to become CBC Radio One's CBCL-FM's new broadcast studio for new local and regional programming such as London Morning and Afternoon Drive and as well as digital content.

Michael Ciccone is currently the 12th CEO of the London Public Library, succeeding Susanna Hubbard Krimmer in August 2019. Ciccone had earlier been executive director of the Centre for Equitable Library Access and, before that, director of collections at Hamilton Public Library.

On the morning of 13 December 2023, the London Public Library was the subject of a cyberattack that resulted in a major system outage. On 3 January, 2024, it was revealed that employee data had been compromised during the attack.

== Branches ==
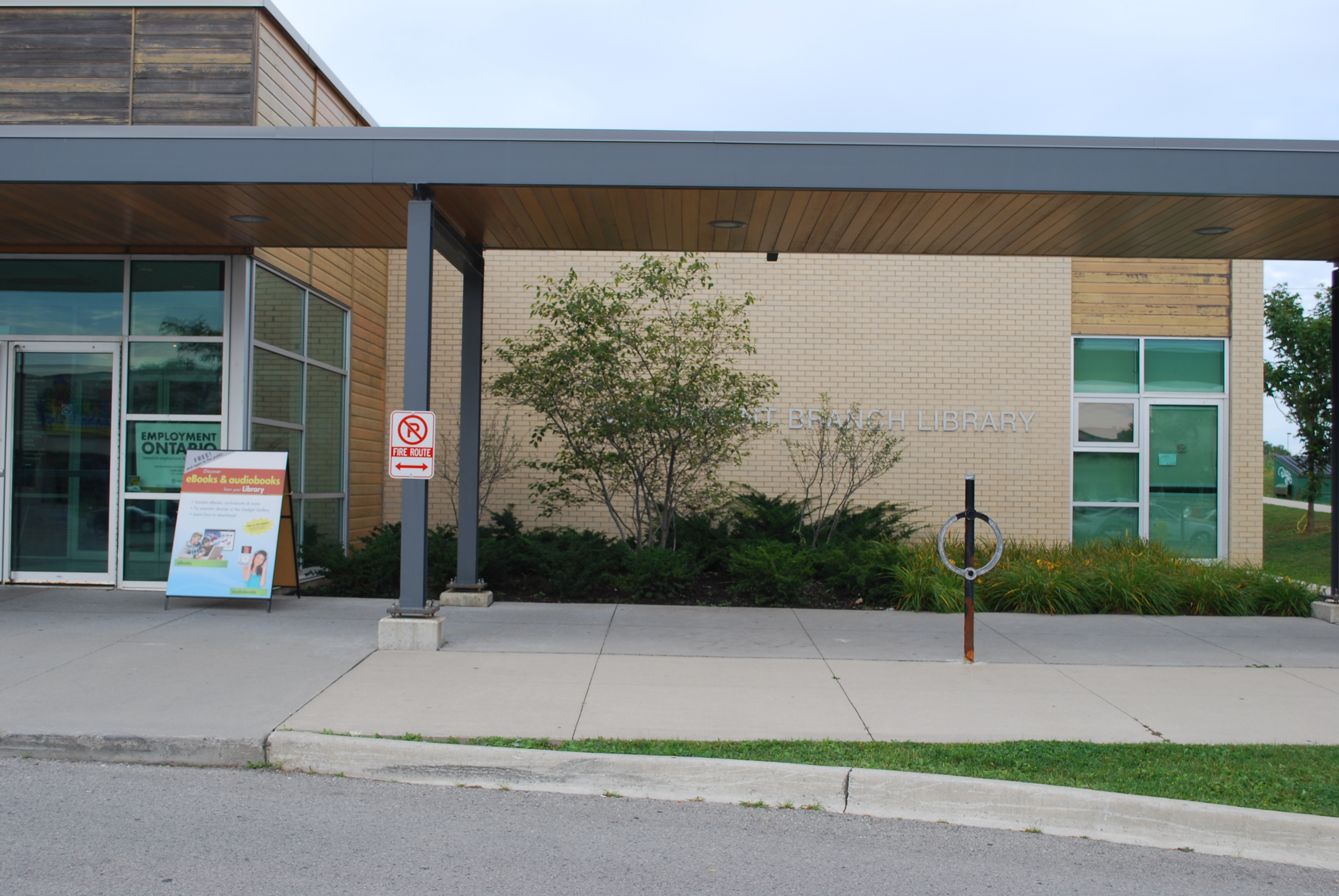
Westmount branch of the London Public Library

The London Public Library has 16 branches. The branches are:

- Beacock - 1280 Huron Street
- Bostwick - 501 Southdale Rd. W.
- Byron - 1295 Commissioners Rd. W.
- Carson - 465 Quebec St.
- Central - 251 Dundas St.
- Cherryhill - 301 Oxford St. W.
- Crouch - 550 Hamilton Rd.
- East London - 2016 Dundas St.
- Glanworth - 2950 Glanworth Dr.
- Jalna - 1119 Jalna Blvd.
- Lambeth - 7112 Beattie St.
- Landon - 167 Wortley Rd.
- Masonville - 30 North Centre Rd.
- Pond Mills - 1166 Commissioners Rd E.
- Sherwood - 1225 Wonderland Rd. N.
- Stoney Creek - 920 Sunningdale Rd. E.

== One Book, One London ==
One Book, One London is a region-wide book club that celebrates reading and brings people together as a community. The London Public Library spearheads this program annually. It was temporarily suspended for 2021, due to the COVID-19 pandemic.

- 2020: The Saturday Night Ghost Club by Craig Davidson
- 2019: The Marrow Thieves by Cherie Dimaline
- 2018: Brother by David Chariandy
- 2017: Etta and Otto and Russell and James by Emma Hooper

== See also ==
- List of public libraries in Ontario
