= CKDK-FM =

Radio station in Woodstock, Ontario

Coordinates: 43°06′08″N 80°46′14″W

- Woodstock, Ontario; Canada
- Broadcast area: Southwestern Ontario
- Frequency: 103.9 MHz
- Branding: Country 104

Programming
- Format: Country

Ownership
- Owner: Corus Entertainment; (Corus Radio Company)
- Sister stations: CFPL, CFPL-FM, CFHK-FM

History
- First air date: December 6, 1947
- Former frequencies: 1340 kHz (AM) (1947–1986); 102.3 MHz (1986–1993)

Technical information
- Licensing authority: CRTC
- Class: C2
- ERP: 51,000 watts
- HAAT: 138.4 metres (454 ft)

Links
- Webcast: Listen Live
- Website: country104.com

CKDK-FM is a Canadian radio station owned by Corus Entertainment, and is licensed to the city of Woodstock, Ontario. It serves the London market, with transmitter power of 51,000 watts on the assigned frequency of 103.9 MHz, covering most of Southwestern Ontario. The station airs a country format branded as Country 104. The studio is located on Dundas Street in Woodstock but it has an office in downtown London and its transmitter is located near Karn Road in Woodstock.

== History ==
CKDK began broadcasting on 1340 AM on December 6, 1947 as CKOX. In 1947, C.O. Tatham and Charles Perry applied for an FM licence at Woodstock as CKOX-FM. They later withdrew their application. The station reapplied a year later to operate at 106.9 MHz, but it is unknown if the station was ever built. The call letters changed to CKDK in 1977, and moved to 102.3 in 1986, becoming K102. It moved to the current frequency in 1993, known at the time as K104 with an adult contemporary format. The station joined the "Energy Radio" network in 1998, simulcast from CING-FM in Hamilton. On January 12, 2000, CKDK and sister station CFHK-FM in St. Thomas, swapped formats, but not call letters. The Hawk format on CFHK was originally an Alternative format, like CFPL-FM, but this was changed to a classic rock format on December 21, 1997.

More 103.9 logo from 2011-2014

On July 22, 2011, the station dropped its classic hits format for an adult hits format under the More 103.9 branding, similar in format to Corus' Edmonton station CKNG-FM.

On September 25, 2012, Shaw received CRTC approval to change the authorized contours of the english-language commercial radio programming undertaking CKDK Woodstock by relocating its transmitter site, by decreasing the average effective radiated power from 52,000 to 51,000 watts and by increasing its effective height of antenna above average terrain from 133 to 138.4 metres.

On February 28, 2014, at 5 PM, the adult hits format was dropped for a country format, branded as Country 104.

== Notes ==
On December 13, 1984, the CRTC approved a number of applications for a number of AM radio stations across Ontario including CKDK Woodstock to increase their nighttime power from 250 watts to 1,000 watts.
