= George Tillson =

Industrialist (1782 - 1864)

George Tilson
- Born: November 25, 1782; Enfield, Massachusetts
- Died: March 15, 1864 (aged 81); Tillsonburg, Canada
- Spouse: Nancy Barker (m. 1808)

George E. Tilson was an industrialist best known for founding the town of Tillsonburg.

Tilson was born on November 25, 1782, in Enfield, Massachusetts. In 1808 he married Nancy Barker. Tilson moved to Upper Canada in 1822, and founded a small iron forge within Norfolk County with Hiram Capron and James and Benjamin Van Norman. In 1825 Tilson bought approximately 600 acres of land in the south-end of Oxford County along the Big Otter Creek using the funds earned from the forge. Tilson constructed a sawmill, lock, blast furnace and another iron forge in the area. Originally called the “Dereham Forge", the town was renamed ‘Tillsonburg’ in 1837 after its founder. It’s also possible Tilson had some involvement with the Rebellions of 1837–1838. Tilson died on March 15, 1864, in the town of Tillsonburg. His son E. D. Tilson constructed the Annandale House which has since been renovated and currently houses the Tillsonburg museum.
