= CIHR-FM =

Radio station in Woodstock, Ontario

Coordinates: 43°06′07″N 80°46′18″W

- Woodstock, Ontario; Canada
- Broadcast area: Oxford County
- Frequency: 104.7 MHz (HD Radio)
- Branding: 104.7 Heart FM

Programming
- Format: Adult contemporary HD2: 70s, 80s, and more

Ownership
- Owner: Byrnes Communications Inc.

History
- First air date: April 10, 2006

Technical information
- Licensing authority: CRTC
- Class: A
- ERP: 8,950 watts
- HAAT: 99.5 metres (326 ft)

Links
- Webcast: Listen Live; Listen Live (HD2)
- Website: heartfm.ca

CIHR-FM is a Canadian radio station broadcasting at 104.7 FM in Woodstock, Ontario. The station plays an adult contemporary format branded as 104.7 Heart FM and is owned by Byrnes Communications Inc. CIHR also broadcasts HD Radio, with the second subchannel playing music from the 1970s, 1980s and 1990s, as well as Christmas music during the holiday season.

== History ==
CIHR-FM signed on the air on April 10, 2006, at 8:00am. On March 17, 2011, the station applied to change the authorized contours by increasing the average effective radiated power from 7,096 watts to 8,950 watts. All other technical parameters would remain unchanged. This application received CRTC approval on November 10, 2011.

The station is simulcast before each movie shown at the Oxford Drive-In in Woodstock, Ontario.
