= CKLO-FM =

Radio station in London, Ontario

Coordinates: 42°56′29″N 81°08′03″W

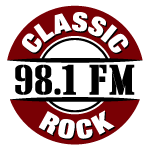
- London, Ontario; Canada
- Broadcast area: Southwestern Ontario
- Frequency: 98.1 MHz
- Branding: Classic Rock 98.1

Programming
- Format: Classic rock

Ownership
- Owner: Blackburn Radio

History
- First air date: July 5, 2011
- Call sign meaning: London

Technical information
- Class: B
- ERP: 40,000 watts
- HAAT: 150 metres (490 ft)

Links
- Webcast: Listen Live
- Website: classicrock981.com

CKLO-FM is a radio station broadcasting a classic rock format on the frequency 98.1 FM in London, Ontario, Canada. The station operates under the branding Classic Rock 98.1. CKLO's studios are located on Richmond Row in downtown London, while its transmitter is located near Highway 401 near Veterans Memorial Parkway southeast of London.

Owned by Blackburn Radio, the station received CRTC approval on February 2, 2009.

On October 15, 2010, Blackburn applied to increase CKLO's effective radiated power from 4,000 to 12,600 watts (directional antenna with a maximum ERP from 7,000 to 40,000 watts), by increasing the effective height of antenna above average terrain from 106.5 to 150 meters and by changing the transmitter site. This application was approved on January 12, 2011. Its signal has a slight null to the east of London, to avoid co-channel interference from CHFI-FM in Toronto.

On September 2, 2026, the station announced an agreement with the London Knights to make the station, along with Brand One Digital, the team's exclusive local radio and streaming media partner.
