= CFPL-FM =

Radio station in London, Ontario, Canada

Coordinates: 42°56′59″N 81°15′52″W

- London, Ontario; Canada
- Broadcast area: Southwestern Ontario
- Frequency: 95.9 MHz
- Branding: FM96

Programming
- Format: Alternative-leaning Active Rock

Ownership
- Owner: Corus Entertainment; (Corus Premium Television Ltd.)
- Sister stations: CFPL, CKDK-FM, CFHK-FM

History
- First air date: May 15, 1948; 78 years ago
- Call sign meaning: Free Press London, after founder The London Free Press

Technical information
- Licensing authority: CRTC
- Class: C1
- ERP: 150,000 watts (300,000 watts maximum)
- HAAT: 273 metres (896 ft)

Links
- Website: fm96.com

CFPL-FM (95.9 MHz branded as FM96) is a commercial radio station in London, Ontario. It is owned by Corus Entertainment and airs an alternative-leaning active rock format. The studios are in downtown London, on Wellington Street at King Street.

CFPL-FM is an unusually high-powered FM station. It has an effective radiated power (ERP) of 150,000 watts with a maximum of 300,000 watts. The transmitter is in Southwest London off Communications Road, atop a tower shared with CFPL-DT and sister station CFHK-FM.

== History ==
CFPL-FM is Canada's third-oldest FM station. It signed on the air on May 15, 1948. It originally broadcast on 93.5 MHz Few people owned FM receivers in that era, and CFPL-FM mostly simulcast the programming on CFPL (AM). It switched its frequency to 95.9 MHz with a power increase to 4,440 watts in 1949. The "FPL" call letters stand for its original owner, The London Free Press daily newspaper.

In 1961, CFPL-FM boosted its signal strength to 179,000 watts. During the 1960s and early 1970s, CFPL-FM broadcast classical music as an affiliate of the CBC FM network. In 1972, the station ended its links to the CBC, and adopted a variety format under the name Stereo 96, which included various musical styles and some talk programming.

In 1979, the station became known as FM96 and the format changed to adult contemporary music under the "Rock 'n' Easy" moniker. CFPL-FM had the slogan "Music Above All" during part of the 1980s. CFPL-FM shifted to album rock in the 1980s. In the 2000s, the playlist turned toward alternative rock and active rock.

In 2006, FM96 was named Station of The Year and won the BDS Cutting Edge Award.
