= CFPL (AM) =

Radio station in London, Ontario

- London, Ontario; Canada
- Broadcast area: Southwestern Ontario
- Frequency: 980 kHz
- Branding: 980 CFPL

Programming
- Format: Talk radio
- Affiliations: Global News; Toronto Blue Jays Radio Network

Ownership
- Owner: Corus Entertainment; (Corus Premium Television Ltd.)
- Sister stations: CFPL-FM, CFHK-FM, CKDK-FM

History
- First air date: September 30, 1922
- Former call signs: CJGC (1922—1933)
- Former frequencies: 430 metres (1922–1925); 910 kHz (1925–1933); 730 kHz (1933–1941); 1570 kHz (1941–1949)
- Call sign meaning: Canada Free Press London (founding owner and local newspaper)

Technical information
- Licensing authority: CRTC
- Class: B
- Power: 10,000 watts day; 5,000 watts night

Links
- Webcast: Listen Live
- Website: globalnews.ca/radio/am980

CFPL (980 kHz) is a commercial radio station licensed to London, Ontario, Canada. It is owned by Corus Entertainment and it broadcasts a talk radio format. The station's studios and offices are located at Wellington Street and King Street in downtown London.

The transmitter is located south of London at Wellington Road and Scotland Drive.

== History ==
=== Early years ===
CFPL is among the oldest stations in Canada. It signed on the air on September 30, 1922. The original call sign was CJGC. Before the AM radio dial was set as it is today, the station broadcast on approximately 698 kilocycles or 430 metres, at a time when wavelength was usually used rather than frequency. It later changed to 910 kHz.

Then, to avoid interference from a Mexican station on 909, it moved to 595 kHz. It stayed on that frequency until it merged with CKOK Windsor to become CKLW in April 1933. During the 1920s and early 1930s, CJGC airtime was used occasionally by CNRL, a phantom station of the Canadian National Railways.

=== CBC affiliation ===
Former logo

In September 1933, the merger with CKLW was dissolved. A new transmitter began broadcasting on 730 kHz with the call sign CFPL. The station was an network affiliate of the Canadian Radio Broadcasting Commission from 1933 to 1936. At that point, it became an affiliate of the new Canadian Broadcasting Corporation (CBC). It carried programmes from the CBC's Dominion Network from 1944 to 1962 before that network was integrated into CBC Radio. The CBC affiliation continued until 1978, when CBC established CBCL-FM on 93.5 MHz, a rebroadcaster of CBL in Toronto.

With the enactment of the North American Regional Broadcasting Agreement (NARBA), the station changed frequency in 1941 to 1570 kHz. Then in February 1949, it switched to 980 kHz. The lower dial position allowed the coverage area to expand.

Former logo

=== MOR, AC and Talk ===
From the 1950s until the 70s, CFPL had a middle of the road (MOR) format of popular adult music, news and sports. In the 1980s and 90s, the format switched to full service adult contemporary (AC). The station even played Top 40 music in some dayparts during the 1960s. CFPL had the distinction of being the first station in North America to list The Beatles at Number One on a radio sales chart when "She Loves You" went to the top spot on December 6, 1963.

Previous logo

By the late 90s, the station eliminated music and had a full time schedule of news, talk and sports. On November 27, 2017, CFPL rebranded as Global News Radio 980 AM. Since 2020, it has been promoted as simply 980 CFPL. The radio station celebrated its 100th anniversary on September 30, 2022.

== Programming ==
On weekdays, CFPL has live and local news, talk and interview shows in morning and afternoon drive time. Devon Peacock has hosted The Morning Show since 2020 while Mike Stubbs hosted London Live in the afternoon until August 2026. The rest of the schedule is largely from nationally syndicated Global News hosts, including The Ben Mulroney Show.

CFPL airs live sports including Toronto Blue Jays baseball games.
