= Fortunian =

First stage of Cambrian Period

- 538.8 ± 0.6 – ~529 Ma
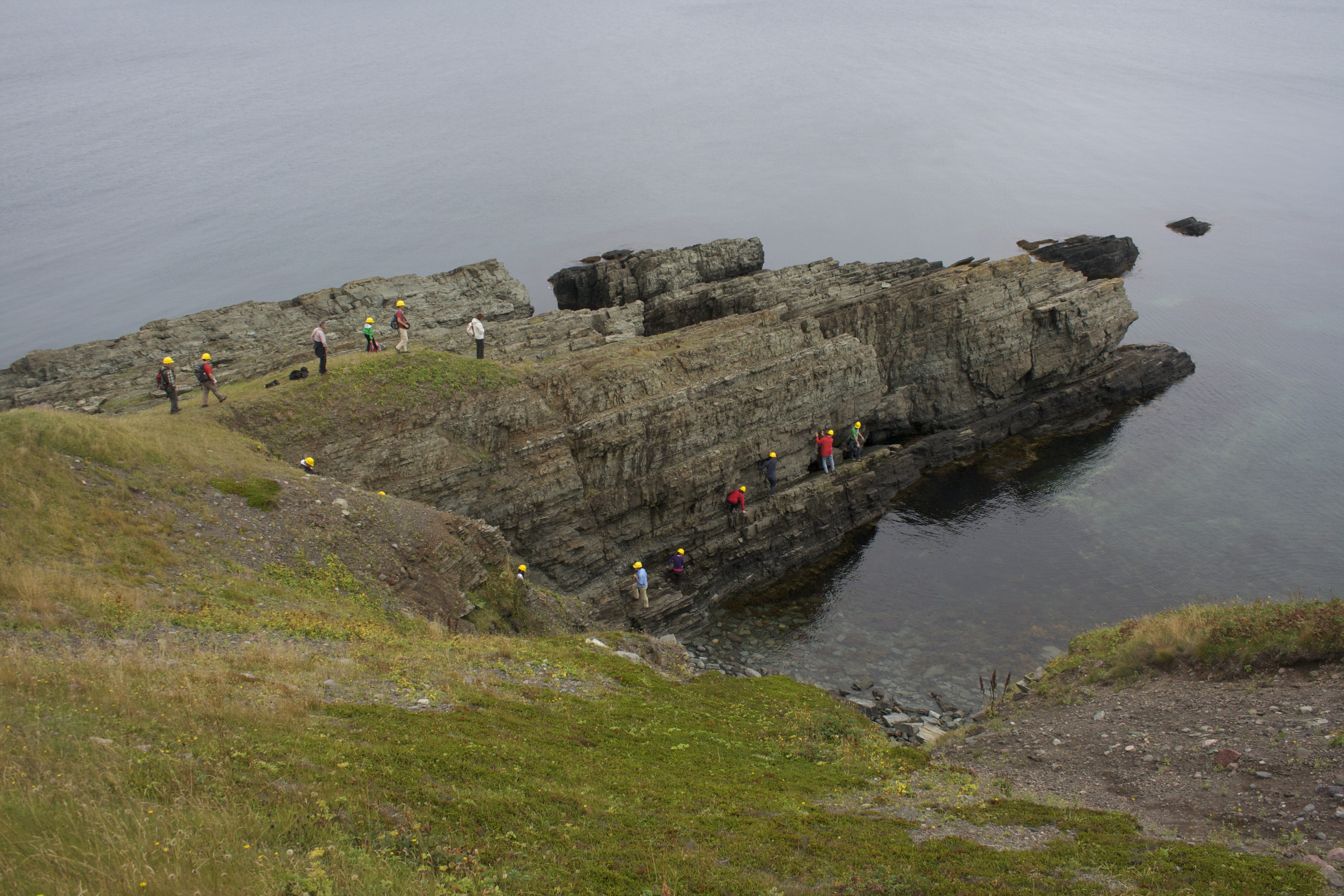
- Delegates from the Ichnia 2012 conference inspect the Global Boundary Stratotype Section and Point (GSSP) for the Ediacaran-Cambrian boundary at Fortune Head Ecological Reserve, Newfoundland, Canada.

Chronology
← / Orsten Fauna; ← / Dresbachian extinction; ← / Burgess Shale; ← / Kaili biota; ← / Archaeocyatha extinction; ← / Emu Bay Shale; ← / Sirius Passet biota; ← / Chengjiang biota; ← / First Trilobites; ← / SSF diversification, first brachiopods & archaeocyatha; ← / First halkieriids, mollusсs, hyoliths SSF; ← / Baykonurian glaciation
Major glacial period
Subdivision of the Cambrian according to the ICS, as of 2024. Vertical axis scale: Millions of years ago

Etymology
- Name formality: Formal
- Name ratified: September 2007
- Former name(s): Cambrian Stage 1

Usage information
- Celestial body: Earth
- Regional usage: Global (ICS)
- Time scale(s) used: ICS Time Scale

Definition
- Chronological unit: Age
- Stratigraphic unit: Stage
- First proposed by: Ed Landing, 2007
- Time span formality: Formal
- Lower boundary definition: Appearance of the Ichnofossil Treptichnus pedum
- Lower boundary GSSP: Fortune Head section, Newfoundland, Canada; 47.0762°N 55.8310°W
- Lower GSSP ratified: September 2007 (as base of Terreneuvian and Fortunian)
- Upper boundary definition: Not formally defined
- Upper boundary definition candidates: First appearance of small shelly fauna or Archaeocyathids
- Upper boundary GSSP candidate section(s): None
- Upper GSSP ratified: Not formally defined

The Fortunian age marks the beginning of the Phanerozoic Eon, the Paleozoic Era, and the Cambrian Period. It is the first of the two stages of the Terreneuvian series. Its base is defined as the first appearance of the trace fossil Treptichnus pedum 538.8 million years ago. The top of the Fortunian which is the base of the Stage 2 of the Cambrian has not been formally defined yet, but will correspond to the appearance of an Archeocyatha species or "Small shelly fossils" approximately 529 million years ago.

The name Fortunian is derived from the town of Fortune on the Burin Peninsula, near the GSSP and Fortune Bay.

== GSSP ==
The type locality (GSSP) of the Fortunian stage is in Fortune Head, at the northern edge of the Burin Peninsula, Newfoundland, Canada (47.0762°N 55.8310°W). This GSSP coincides with the base of the Terreneuvian series, the Precambrian-Cambrian boundary and the beginning of the Phanerozoic. The outcrops show a carbonate-siliciclastic succession which is mapped as the Chapel Island Formation. The formation is divided into the following members that are composed of peritidal sandstones and shales (Member 1), muddy deltaic and shelf sandstones and mudstones (Member 2A), laminated siltstones (Member 2B and 3) and mudstones and limestones of the inner shelf (Member 4). The Precambrian-Cambrian boundary lies 2.4 m above the base of the 2nd member which is the lowest occurrence of Treptichnus pedum. The traces can be seen on the lower surface of the sandstone layers. The first calcareous shelled skeletal fossils (Ladatheca cylindrica) is 400 m above the boundary. The first trilobites appear 1,400 m above the boundary, which corresponds to the beginning of the Branchian Series.
