= Ed Landing =

American paleontologist (born 1949)

Ed Landing (born 10 August 1949 in Milwaukee) is an American geologist and paleontologist.

== Education ==
As an undergraduate, Landing studied at the University of Wisconsin, where he gained his BSc, later attending graduate school at the University of Michigan, earning his MSc and PhD.

== Career ==
He held post doctoral positions at University of Waterloo, Ontario; U. S. Geological Survey, Denver; and the University of Toronto. He then spent his career as a New York State paleontologist and curator of paleontology at the New York State Museum in Albany, where he became an emeritus in 2015.

=== Field work ===
His field work in America and Canada (as well as in Mexico, Argentina, England, Wales, Germany, Morocco, Israel, Jordan, Siberia, south China) led to over 250 publications and 11 books that focus on the origin and precise uranium–lead dating (U-Pb) geochronology of the oldest metazoans, the biostratigraphy of the Early Paleozoic, recognition of ancient climate cycles and the proposal that high sea levels lead to heightened global warming (hyperwarming)(^{1},^{2}) and reconstruction of Avalonia as a separate, unified continent by the terminal Ediacaran. He was a co-proposer of the Ediacaran-Cambrian global stratotype at Fortune Head, eastern Newfoundland, the lowest divisions of the Cambrian Period (the Terreneuvian Epoch and Fortunian Age), and recovered Earth's oldest bryozoan from rock sections in Oaxaca State, southern Mexico.

== Selected publications ==
In June 2010, an article in the magazine Geology for which Landing was the lead author was noted for providing the first definitive proof that "all major animal groups with internal and external skeletons appeared in the Cambrian geological period (543–489 million years ago)."

== Awards ==
- In 1978, Best Paper, Journal of Sedimentary Petrology (1977 vol., by B.H. Wilkinson and E. Landing).
- In 1990, Best Paper, Journal of Paleontology (1989 volume, by E. Landing, P. Myrow, A.P. Benus, and G.M. Narbonne).
- In 1993, he was recognized with a State of New York Legislative Resolution, Assembly No. 479, by Assemblyman Englebright et al. in recognition of establishing Precambrian–Cambrian global stratotype.
- In 2008, he received the R.J.W. Douglas Award for career contributions to geological synthesis of Canada, the first time the award was given to U. S. citizen and to a paleontologist.
- In 2009, he was named a Fellow (Geology and Geography Section) for the American Association for the Advancement of Science.
- In 2013, he became a Fellow of Geological Society of America.
