= Terreneuvian =

First epoch of the Cambrian Period

- 538.8 ± 0.6 – ~521 Ma
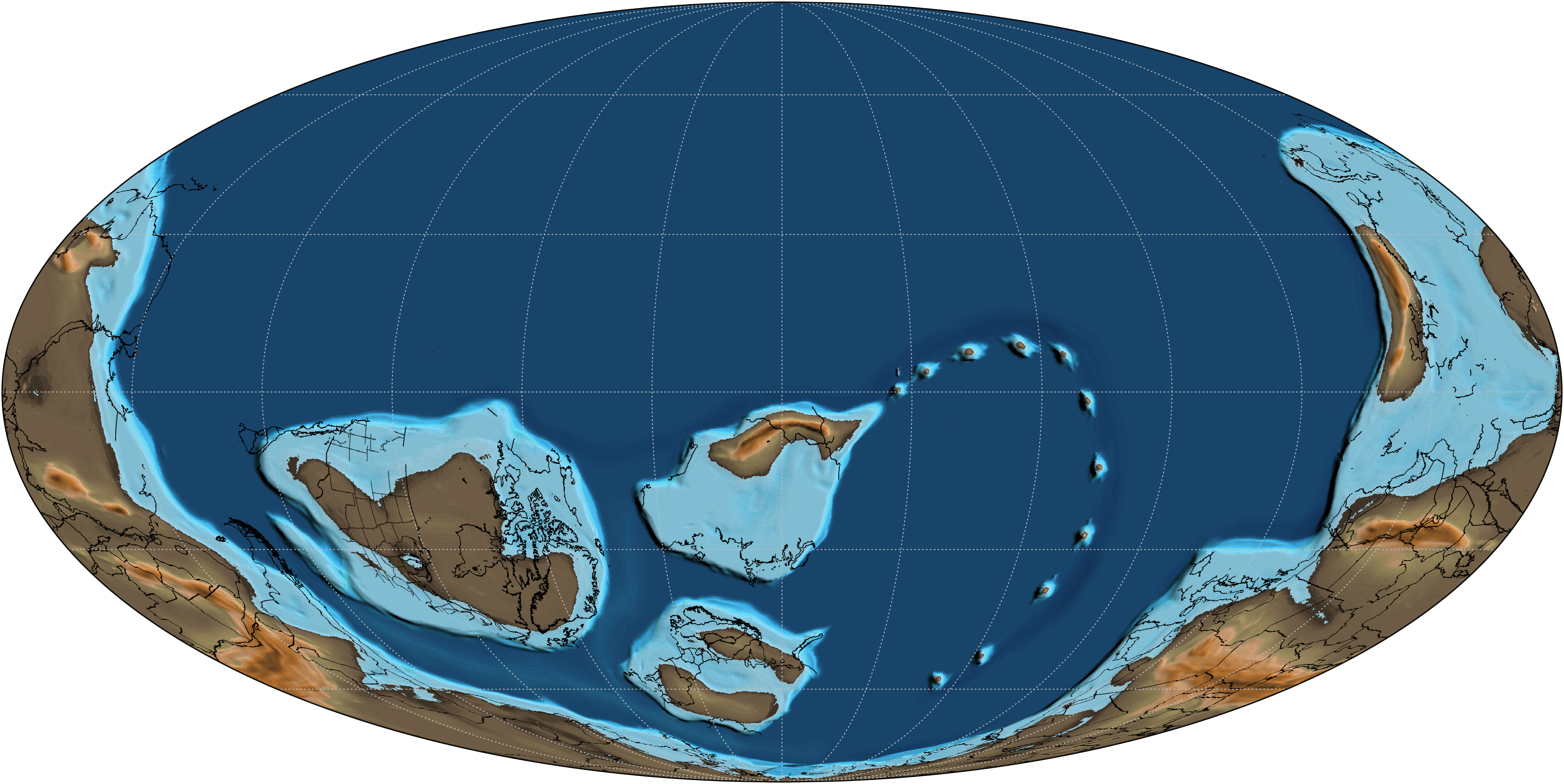
- A map of Earth as it appeared 530 million years ago during the Terreneuvian Series, Fortunian Stage

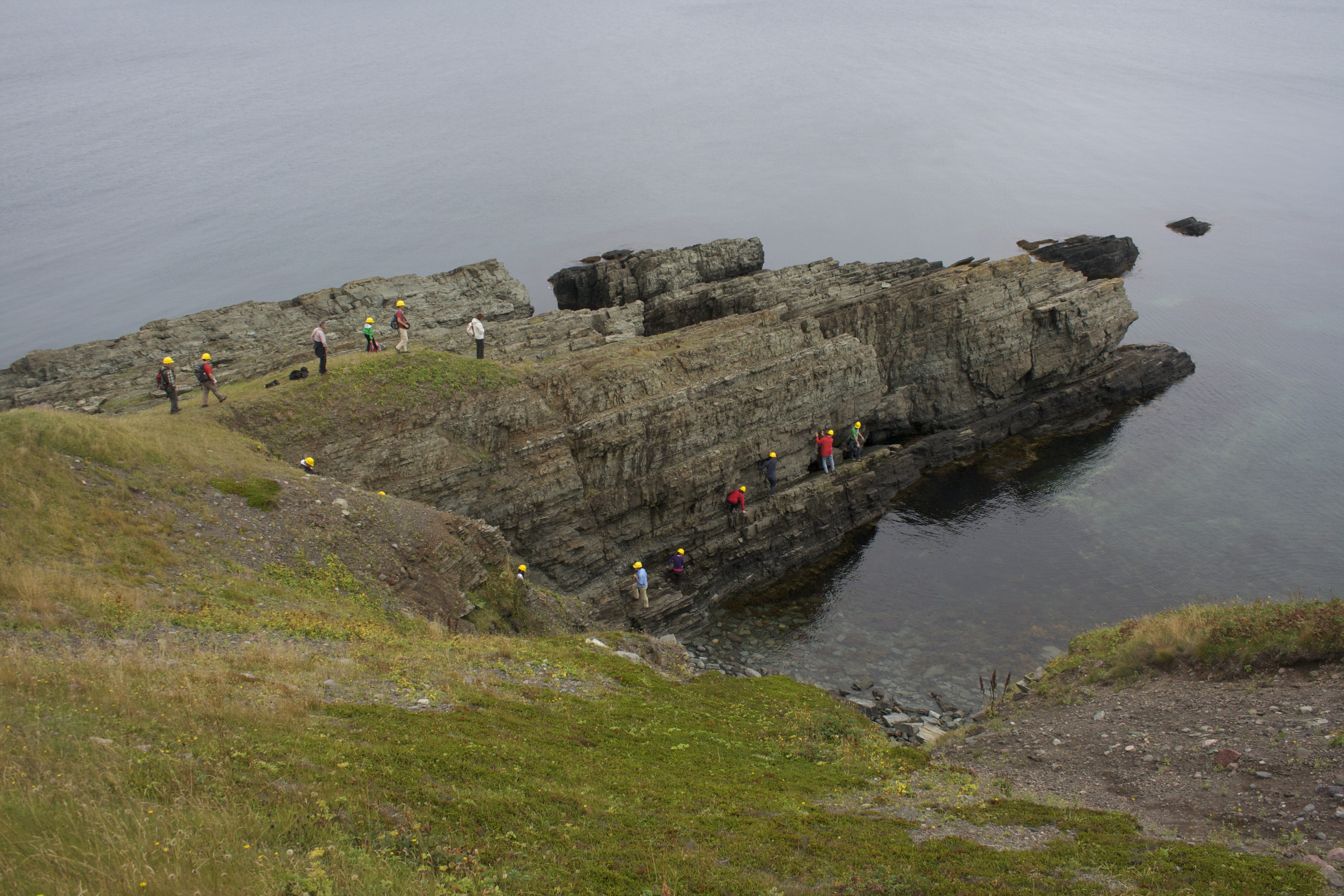
- Delegates from the Ichnia 2012 conference inspect the Global Boundary Stratotype Section and Point (GSSP) for the Ediacaran-Cambrian boundary at Fortune Head Ecological Reserve, Newfoundland, Canada.

Chronology
← / Orsten Fauna; ← / Dresbachian extinction; ← / Burgess Shale; ← / Kaili biota; ← / Archaeocyatha extinction; ← / Emu Bay Shale; ← / Sirius Passet biota; ← / Chengjiang biota; ← / First Trilobites; ← / SSF diversification, first brachiopods & archaeocyatha; ← / First halkieriids, mollusсs, hyoliths SSF; ← / Baykonurian glaciation
Major glacial period
Subdivision of the Cambrian according to the ICS, as of 2024. Vertical axis scale: Millions of years ago

Etymology
- Name formality: Formal
- Name ratified: September 2007
- Former name(s): Cambrian Stage 1

Usage information
- Celestial body: Earth
- Regional usage: Global (ICS)
- Time scale(s) used: ICS Time Scale

Definition
- Chronological unit: Epoch
- Stratigraphic unit: Series
- First proposed by: Ed Landing, 2007
- Time span formality: Formal
- Lower boundary definition: Appearance of the Ichnofossil Treptichnus pedum
- Lower boundary GSSP: Fortune Head section, Newfoundland, Canada; 47.072163°N 55.864398°W
- Lower GSSP ratified: September 2007 (as base of Terreneuvian and Fortunian)
- Upper boundary definition: Not formally defined
- Upper boundary definition candidates: FAD of Trilobites
- Upper boundary GSSP candidate section(s): None
- Upper GSSP ratified: Not formally defined

The Terreneuvian or Early Cambrian is the lowermost and oldest series of the Cambrian geological system. Its base is defined by the first appearance datum of the trace fossil Treptichnus pedum around 538.8 million years ago. Its top is defined as the first appearance of trilobites in the stratigraphic record around 521 million years ago. This series' name was formally accepted by the International Commission on Stratigraphy in 2007.

The Fortunian stage and presently unnamed Cambrian Stage 2 are the stages within this series. The Terreneuvian corresponds to the pre-trilobitic Cambrian.

The name Terreneuvian is derived from Terre Neuve, the French name for the island of Newfoundland, Canada, where many rocks of this age are found, including the type section.

== GSSP ==
The type locality (GSSP) of the Terreneuvian is in Fortune Head, at the northern edge of the Burin Peninsula, Newfoundland, Canada (47.0762°N 55.8310°W). The outcrops show a carbonate-siliciclastic succession which is mapped as the Chapel Island Formation. The formation is divided into the following members that are composed of peritidal sandstones and shales (Member 1), muddy deltaic and shelf sandstones and mudstones (Member 2A), laminated siltstones (Member 2B and 3) and mudstones and limestones of the inner shelf (Member 4). The Precambrian-Cambrian boundary lies 2.4 m above the base of the second member, which is the lowest occurrence of Treptichnus pedum. The traces can be seen on the lower surface of the sandstone layers. The first calcareous shelled skeletal fossils (Ladatheca cylindrica) are 400 m above the boundary. The first trilobites appear 1400 m above the boundary, which corresponds to the beginning of the Branchian Series (Series 2).

== Major events ==
The second phase of the Cambrian explosion occurs during the Terreneuvian. Lots of lophotrochozoan and calcified basal metazoan lineages appeared in this epoch. However, deuterostomes are absent in this interval, with the possible exception of Yanjiahella from the Fortunian.

== See also ==
- Stratigraphy of the Cambrian
