= Phanerozoic =

Fourth and current eon of the geological timescale

- 538.8 ± 0.6 – 0 Ma
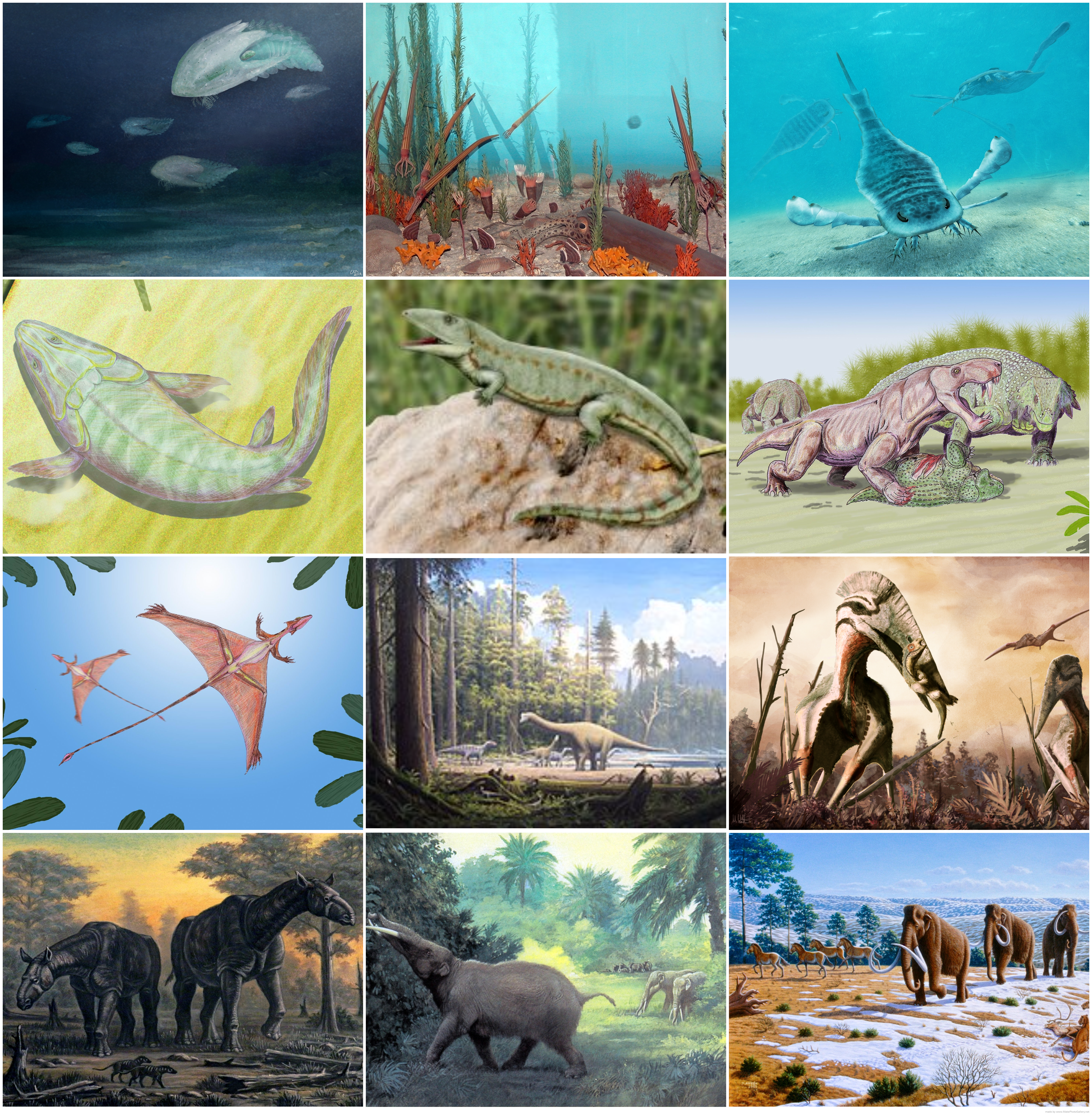
- Fauna and flora from each of the twelve periods of the Phanerozoic. From top left: Cambrian, Ordovician, Silurian, Devonian, Carboniferous, Permian, Triassic, Jurassic, Cretaceous, Paleogene, Neogene, and Quaternary species.

Chronology
Subdivision of the Phanerozoic according to the ICS, as of 2024. Vertical axis scale: Millions of years ago

Etymology
- Name formality: Formal

Usage information
- Celestial body: Earth
- Regional usage: Global (ICS)
- Time scale(s) used: ICS Time Scale

Definition
- Chronological unit: Eon
- Stratigraphic unit: Eonothem
- First proposed by: George Halcott Chadwick, 1930
- Time span formality: Formal
- Lower boundary definition: Appearance of the Ichnofossil Treptichnus pedum
- Lower boundary GSSP: Fortune Head section, Newfoundland, Canada; 47.0762°N 55.8310°W
- Lower GSSP ratified: August 1992 (as base of Cambrian)
- Upper boundary definition: N/A
- Upper boundary GSSP: N/A
- Upper GSSP ratified: N/A

The Phanerozoic (Note: /ˌfænərəˈzoʊ.ɪk, ˌfænrə-, -roʊ-/ FAN-ər-ə-ZOH-ik, FAN-rə-, -roh-.) is the current and the latest of the four geologic eons in the Earth's geologic time scale, covering the time period from 538.8 ± 0.6 million years ago to the present. It is the eon during which abundant animal and plant life has proliferated, diversified and colonised various niches on the Earth's surface, beginning with the Cambrian period when animals first developed hard shells that can be clearly preserved in the fossil record. The time before the Phanerozoic, collectively called the Precambrian, is now divided into the Hadean, Archaean and Proterozoic eons.

The time span of the Phanerozoic starts with the sudden appearance of fossilised evidence of a number of animal phyla; the evolution of those phyla into diverse forms; the evolution of plants; the evolution of fish, arthropods and molluscs; the terrestrial colonisation and evolution of insects, chelicerates, myriapods and tetrapods; and the development of modern flora dominated by vascular plants. During this interval, plate tectonic processes assembled the continents into Pangaea, the most recent supercontinent, before its later fragmentation into the present-day continental landmasses.

== Etymology ==
The term "Phanerozoic" was coined in 1930 by the American geologist George Halcott Chadwick (1876–1953), deriving from the Ancient Greek words φανερός (phanerós), meaning "visible"; and ζωή (zōḗ), meaning "life". This is because it was once believed that life began in the Cambrian, the first period of this eon, due to the lack of Precambrian fossil record back then. However, trace fossils of booming complex life from the Ediacaran period (Avalon explosion) of the preceding Proterozoic eon have since been discovered, and the modern scientific consensus now agrees that complex life (in the form of placozoans and primitive sponges such as Otavia) has existed at least since the Tonian period and the earliest known life forms (in the form of simple prokaryotic microbial mats) started in the ocean floor during the earlier Archean eon.

== Proterozoic–Phanerozoic boundary ==
Life timeline
← / Earth formed; ← / Earliest water; ← / LUCA; ← / Earliest fossils; ← / Great Oxygenation Event; ← / Sexual reproduction; ← / Earliest fungi; ← / Neoproterozoic oxygenation event; ← / Ediacaran biota; ← / Cambrian explosion; ← / Earliest tetrapods; ← / Earliest hominoid
(million years ago)

The Proterozoic–Phanerozoic boundary is at 538.8 million years ago. In the 19th century, the boundary was set at time of appearance of the first abundant animal (metazoan) fossils, but trace fossils of several hundred groups (taxa) of complex soft-bodied metazoa from the preceding Ediacaran period of the Proterozoic eon, known as the Avalon Explosion, have been identified since the systematic study of those forms started in the 1950s. The transition from the largely sessile Precambrian biota to the active mobile Cambrian biota occurred early in the Phanerozoic.

== Eras of the Phanerozoic ==
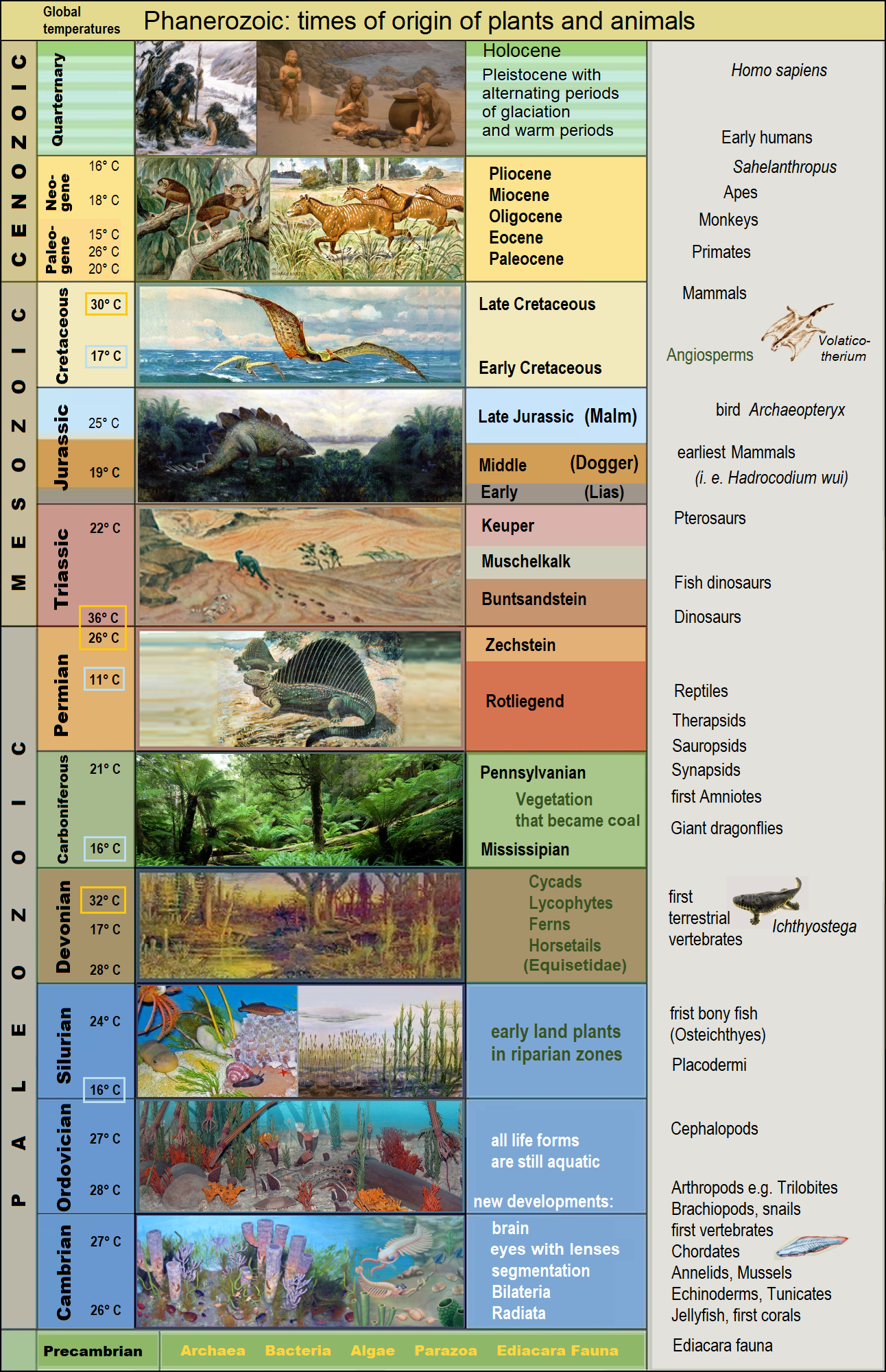
Eras of the Phanerozoic each represented by characteristic developments

The Phanerozoic is divided into three eras: the Paleozoic, Mesozoic and Cenozoic, which are further subdivided into 12 periods. The Paleozoic features the evolution of the three most prominent animal phyla, arthropods, molluscs and chordates, the last of which includes fish, amphibians and the fully terrestrial amniotes (synapsids and sauropsids). The Mesozoic features the evolution of crocodilians, turtles, dinosaurs (including birds), lepidosaurs (lizards and snakes) and mammals. The Cenozoic begins with the extinction of all non-avian dinosaurs, pterosaurs and marine reptiles, and features the great diversification in birds and mammals. Humans appeared and evolved during the most recent part of the Cenozoic.

=== Paleozoic Era ===
The Paleozoic is a time in Earth's history when active complex life forms evolved, took their first foothold on dry land, and when the forerunners of all multicellular life on Earth began to diversify. There are six periods in the Paleozoic era: Cambrian, Ordovician, Silurian, Devonian, Carboniferous and Permian.

==== Cambrian Period ====
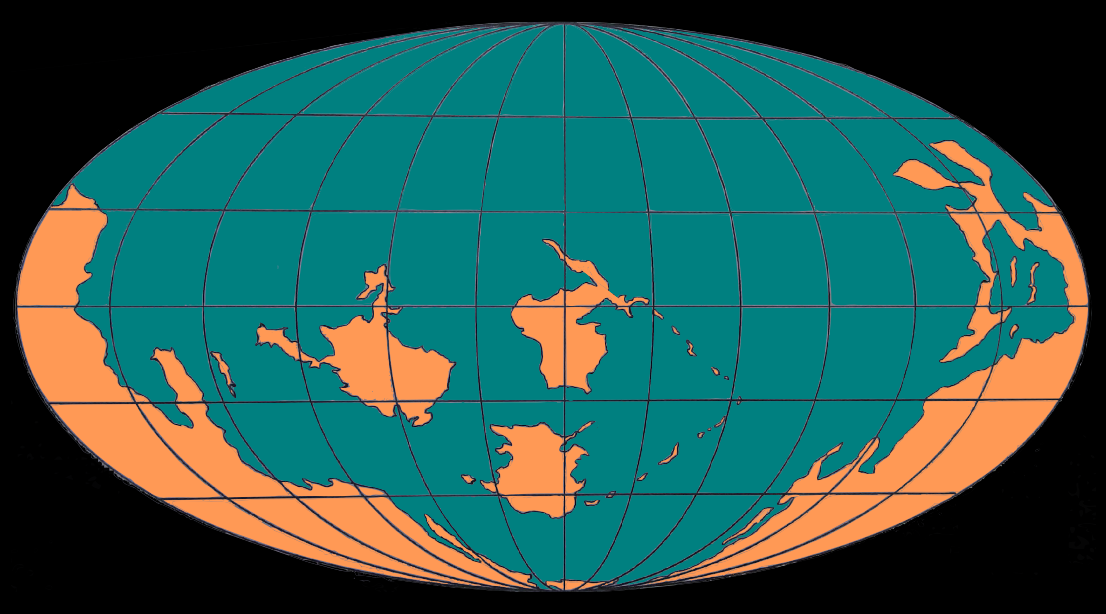
Global map reconstruction showing continents at 500 million years ago

The Cambrian is the first period of the Paleozoic Era and ran from 539 million to 485 million years ago. The Cambrian sparked a rapid expansion in the diversity of animals, in an event known as the Cambrian explosion, during which the greatest number of animal body plans evolved in a single period in the history of Earth. Complex algae evolved, and the fauna was dominated by armoured arthropods (such as trilobites and radiodontids) and to a lesser extent shelled cephalopods (such as orthocones). Almost all phyla of marine animals evolved in this period. During this time, the super-continent Pannotia began to break up, most of which later recombined into the super-continent Gondwana.

==== Ordovician Period ====
The Ordovician spans from 485 million to 444 million years ago. The Ordovician was a time in Earth's history in which many groups still prevalent today evolved or diversified, such as primitive nautiloids, vertebrates (then only jawless fish) and corals. This process is known as the Great Ordovician Biodiversification Event or GOBE. Trilobites began to be replaced by articulate brachiopods, and crinoids also became an increasingly important part of the fauna. The first arthropods crept ashore to colonise Gondwana, a continent empty of animal life. A group of freshwater green algae, the streptophytes, also survived being washed ashore and began to colonise the flood plains and riparian zones, giving rise to primitive land plants.

By the end of the Ordovician, Gondwana had moved from the equator to the South Pole, and Laurentia had collided with Baltica, closing the Iapetus Ocean. The glaciation of Gondwana resulted in a major drop in sea level, killing off all life that had established along its coast. Glaciation caused an icehouse Earth, leading to the Ordovician–Silurian extinction, during which 60% of marine invertebrates and 25% of families became extinct. Though one of the deadliest mass extinctions in earth's history, the O–S extinction did not cause profound ecological changes between the periods.

==== Silurian Period ====
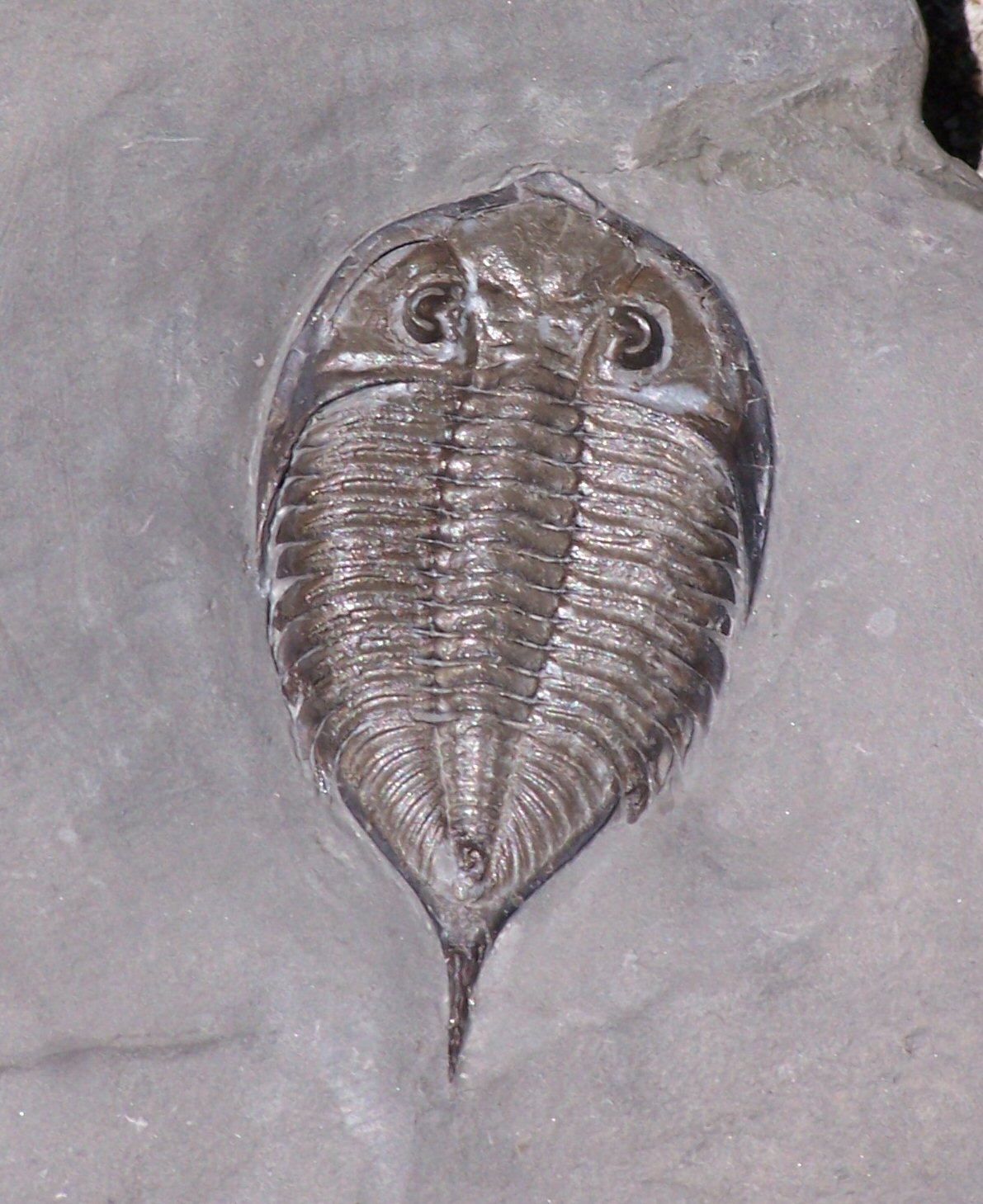
Dalmanites limulurus, a species of Silurian trilobites

The Silurian spans from 444 million to 419 million years ago, which saw a warming from an icehouse Earth. This period saw the mass diversification of fish, as jawless fish became more numerous, and early jawed fish and freshwater species appeared in the fossil record. Arthropods remained abundant, and some groups, such as eurypterids, became apex predators in the ocean. Fully terrestrial life established itself on land, including early fungi, arachnids, hexapods and myriapods. The evolution of vascular plants (mainly spore-producing ferns such as Cooksonia) allowed land plants to gain a foothold further inland as well. During this time, there were four continents: Gondwana (Africa, South America, Australia, Antarctica, India), Laurentia (North America with parts of Europe), Baltica (the rest of Europe), and Siberia (Northern Asia).

==== Devonian Period ====
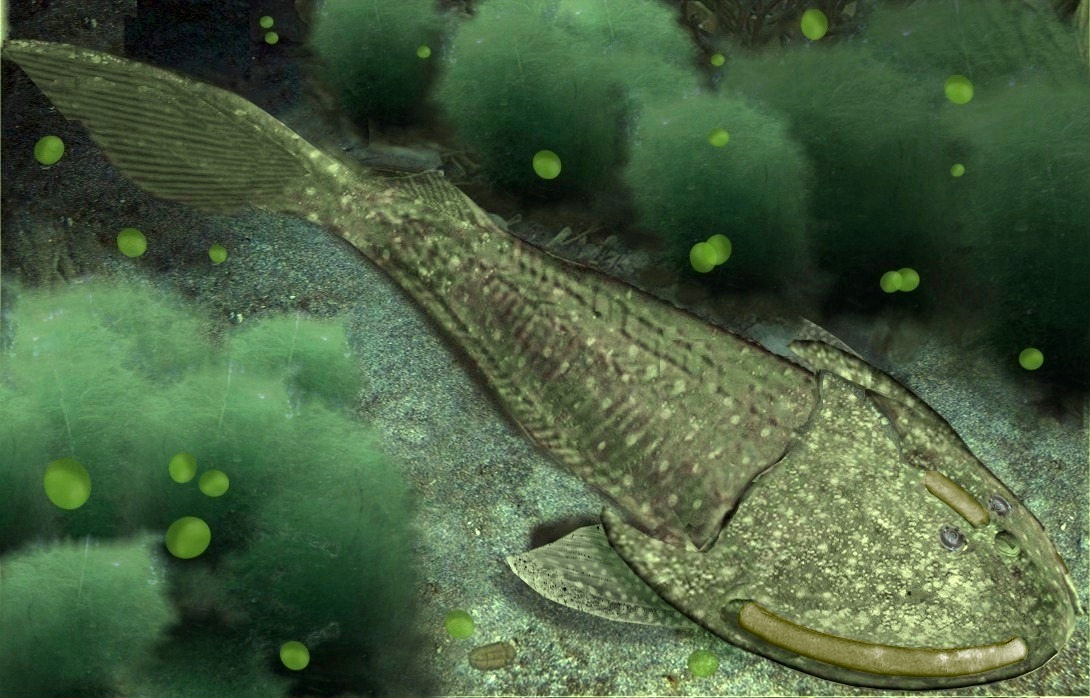
Cephalaspis, a jawless fish

The Devonian spans from 419 million to 359 million years ago. Also informally known as the "Age of the Fish", the Devonian features a huge diversification in fish such as the jawless conodonts and ostracoderms, as well as jawed fish such as the armoured placoderms (e.g. Dunkleosteus), the spiny acanthodians and early bony fish. The Devonian also saw the primitive appearance of modern fish groups such as chondricthyans (cartilaginous fish) and osteichthyans (bony fish), the latter of which include two clades — the actinopterygians (ray-finned fish) and sarcopterygians (lobe-finned fish). One lineage of sarcopterygians, Rhipidistia, evolved the first four-limbed vertebrates, which would eventually become tetrapods. On land, plant groups diversified after the Silurian-Devonian Terrestrial Revolution; the first woody ferns and the earliest seed plants evolved during this period. By the Middle Devonian, shrub-like forests existed: lycophytes, horsetails and progymnosperm. This greening event also allowed the diversification of arthropods as they took advantage of the new habitat. Near the end of the Devonian, 70% of all species became extinct in a sequence of mass extinction events, collectively known as the Late Devonian extinction.

==== Carboniferous Period ====
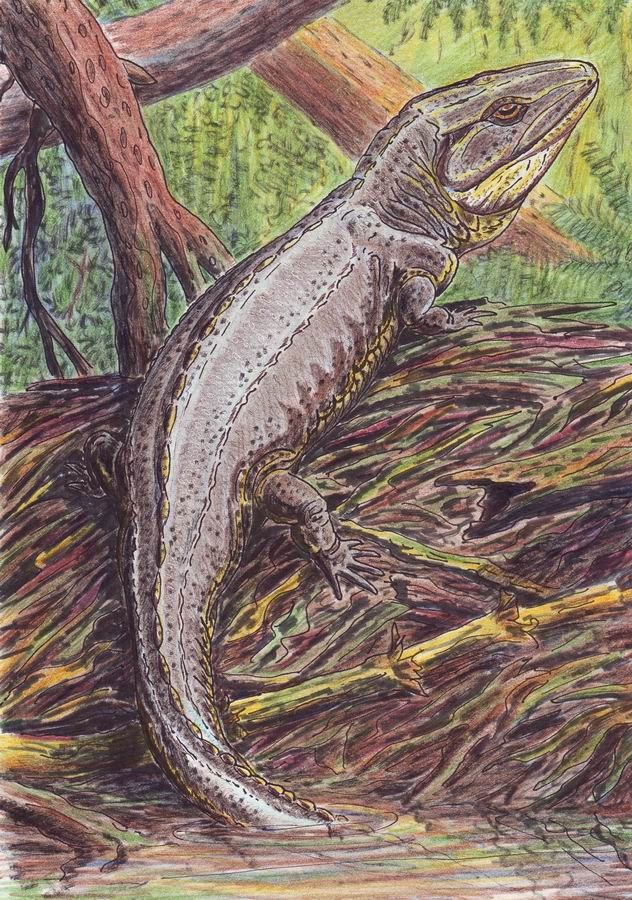
Proterogyrinus, a Carboniferous amphibian (non-amniote tetrapod)

The Carboniferous spans from 359 million to 299 million years ago. Tropical swamps dominated the Earth, and the large amounts of trees sequestered much of the carbon that became coal deposits (hence the name Carboniferous and the term "coal forest"). About 90% of all coal beds were deposited in the Carboniferous and Permian periods, which represent just 2% of the Earth's geologic history. The high oxygen levels caused by these wetland rainforests allowed arthropods, normally limited in size by their respiratory systems, to proliferate and increase in size. Tetrapods also diversified during the Carboniferous as semiaquatic amphibians such as the temnospondyls, and one lineage developed extraembryonic membranes that allowed their eggs to survive outside of the water. These tetrapods, the amniotes, included the first sauropsids (which evolved the reptiles, dinosaurs and birds) and synapsids (the ancestors of mammals). Throughout the Carboniferous, there was a cooling pattern, which eventually led to the glaciation of Gondwana as much of it was situated around the South Pole. This event was known as the Permo-Carboniferous Glaciation and resulted in a major loss of coal forests, known as the Carboniferous rainforest collapse.

==== Permian Period ====
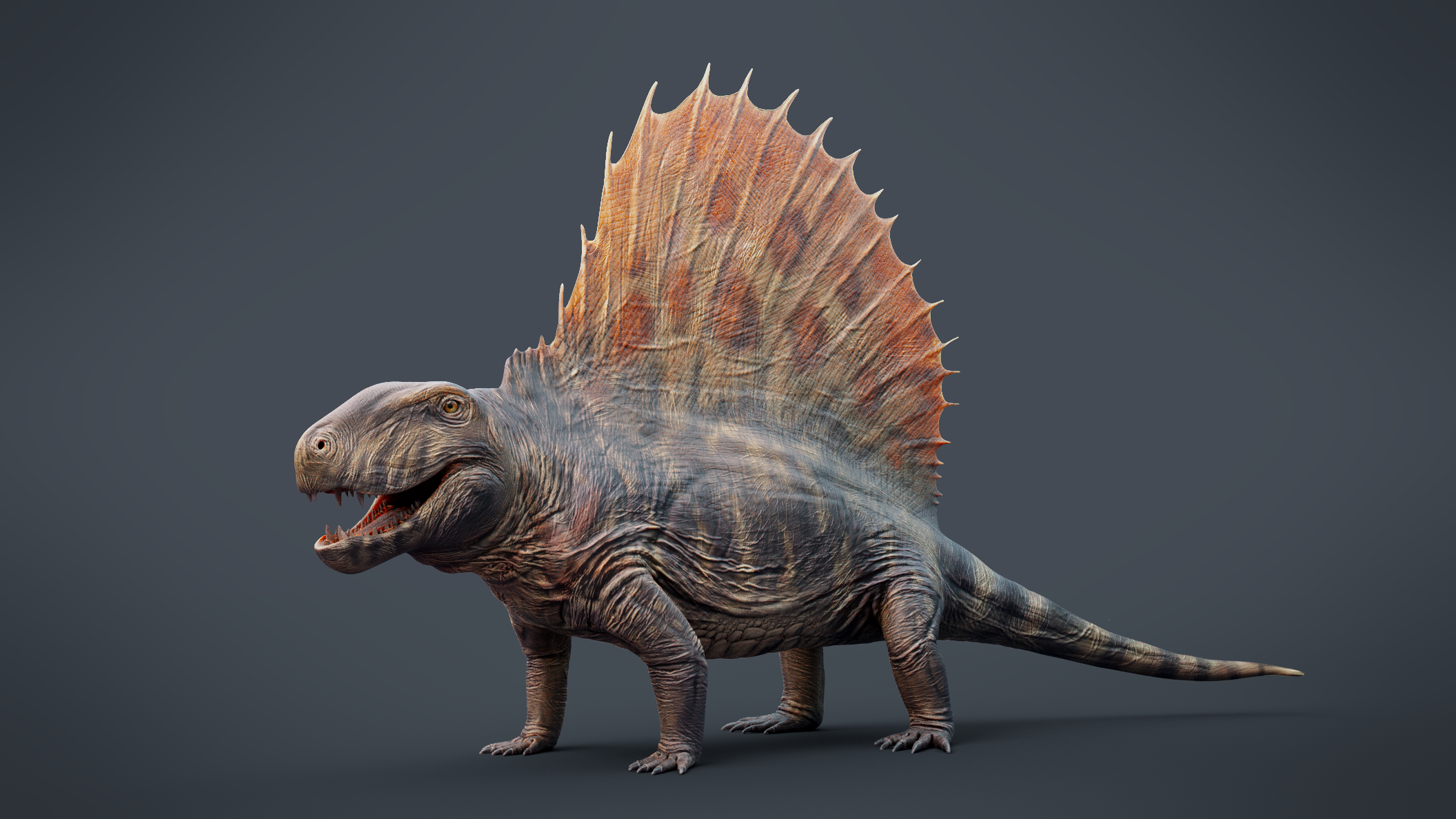
Dimetrodon grandis, a synapsid from the early Permian

The Permian spans from 299 million to 251 million years ago and was the last period of the Paleozoic era. At its beginning, all landmasses came together to form the supercontinent Pangaea, surrounded by one expansive ocean called Panthalassa. The Earth was relatively dry compared to the Carboniferous, with harsh seasons, as the climate of the interior of Pangaea was not moderated by large bodies of water. Amniotes still flourished and diversified in the new dry climate, particularly synapsids such as Dimetrodon, Edaphosaurus and therapsids, which gave rise to the ancestors of modern mammals. The first conifers evolved during this period, then dominated the terrestrial landscape. The Permian ended with at least one mass extinction, an event sometimes known as "the Great Dying", caused by large floods of lava (the Siberian Traps in Russia and the Emeishan Traps in China). This extinction was the largest in Earth's history and led to the loss of 95% of all species of life.

=== Mesozoic Era ===
The Mesozoic ranges from 252 million to 66 million years ago. Also referred to as the Age of Reptiles, Age of Dinosaurs or Age of Conifers, the Mesozoic featured the first time the sauropsids ascended to ecological dominance over the synapsids, as well as the diversification of many modern ray-finned fish, insects, molluscs (particularly the coleoids), tetrapods and plants. The Mesozoic is subdivided into three periods: the Triassic, Jurassic and Cretaceous.

==== Triassic Period ====
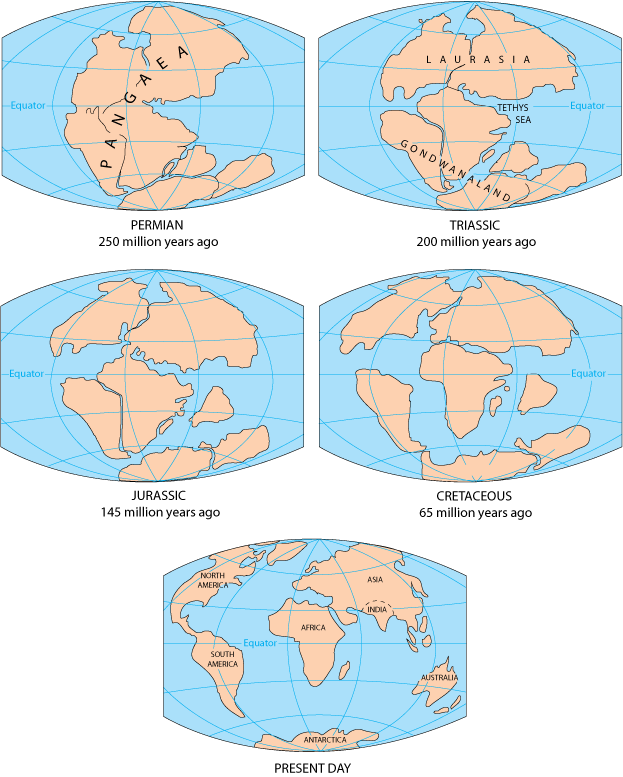
Global maps showing continental movement from 250 million years ago to present day.

The Triassic ranges from 252 million to 201 million years ago. The Triassic is mostly a transitional recovery period between the desolate aftermath of the Permian Extinction and the lush Jurassic Period. It has three major epochs: Early Triassic, Middle Triassic, and Late Triassic.

The Early Triassic lasted between 252 million to 247 million years ago, and was a hot and arid epoch in the aftermath of the Permian Extinction. Many tetrapods during this epoch represented a disaster fauna, a group of survivor animals with low diversity and cosmopolitanism (wide geographic ranges). Temnospondyli recovered first and evolved into large aquatic predators during the Triassic. Other reptiles also diversified rapidly, with aquatic reptiles such as ichthyosaurs and sauropterygians proliferating in the seas. On land, the first true archosaurs appeared, including pseudosuchians (crocodile relatives) and avemetatarsalians (bird/dinosaur relatives).

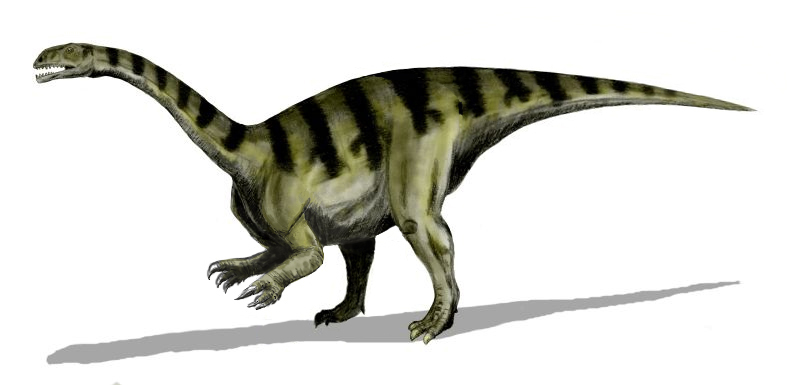
Plateosaurus, an early sauropodomorph dinosaur

The Middle Triassic spans from 247 million to 237 million years ago. The Middle Triassic featured the beginnings of the break-up of Pangaea as rifting commenced in north Pangaea. The northern part of the Tethys Ocean, the Paleotethys Ocean, had become a passive basin, but a spreading centre was active in the southern part of the Tethys Ocean, the Neotethys Ocean. Phytoplankton, coral, crustaceans and many other marine invertebrates recovered from the Permian extinction by the end of the Middle Triassic. Meanwhile, on land, reptiles continued to diversify, conifer forests flourished, as well as the first flies.

The Late Triassic spans from 237 million to 201 million years ago. Following the bloom of the Middle Triassic, the Late Triassic was initially warm and arid with a strong monsoon climate and with most precipitation limited to coastal regions and high latitudes. This changed late in the Carnian period with a 2 million years-long wet season which transformed the arid continental interior into lush alluvial forests. The first true dinosaurs appeared early in the Late Triassic, and pterosaurs evolved a bit later. Other large reptilian competitors to the dinosaurs were wiped out by the Triassic–Jurassic extinction event, in which most archosaurs (excluding crocodylomorphs, pterosaurs and dinosaurs), most therapsids (except cynodonts) and almost all large amphibians became extinct, as well as 34% of marine life in the fourth mass extinction event. The cause of the extinction is debated, but likely resulted from eruptions of the CAMP large igneous province.

==== Jurassic Period ====
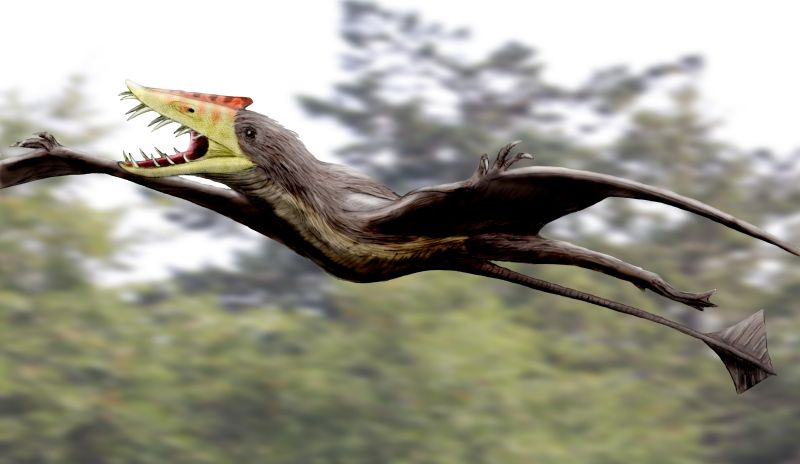
Sericipterus, a pterosaur

The Jurassic ranges from 201 million to 145 million years ago, and features three major epochs: Early Jurassic, Middle Jurassic and Late Jurassic.

The Early Jurassic epoch spans from 201 million to 174 million years ago. The climate was much more humid than during the Triassic, and as a result, the world was warm and partially tropical, though possibly with short colder intervals. Plesiosaurs, ichthyosaurs and ammonites dominated the seas, while dinosaurs, pterysaurs and other reptiles dominated the land, with species such as Dilophosaurus at the apex. Crocodylomorphs evolved into aquatic forms, pushing the remaining large amphibians to near extinction. True mammals were present during the Jurassic but remained small, with average body masses of less than 10 kilograms (22 lb) until the end of the Cretaceous.

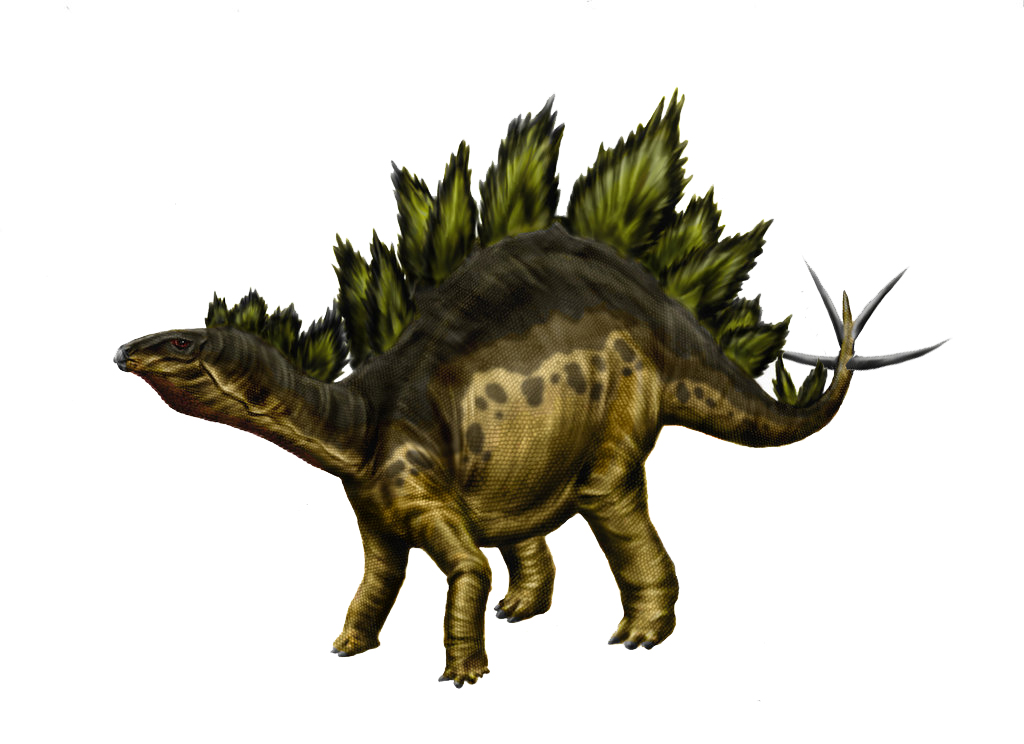
Stegosaurus, a large ornithischian dinosaur from the Late Jurassic

The Middle and Late Jurassic Epochs span from 174 million to 145 million years ago. Conifer savannahs made up a large portion of the world's forests. In the oceans, plesiosaurs were quite common, and ichthyosaurs were flourishing. The Late Jurassic Epoch spans from 163 million to 145 million years ago. The Late Jurassic featured a severe extinction of sauropods in northern continents, alongside many ichthyosaurs. However, the Jurassic-Cretaceous boundary did not strongly impact most forms of life.

==== Cretaceous Period ====
The Cretaceous is the Phanerozoic's longest period and the last period of the Mesozoic. It spans from 145 million to 66 million years ago, and is divided into two epochs: Early Cretaceous, and Late Cretaceous.

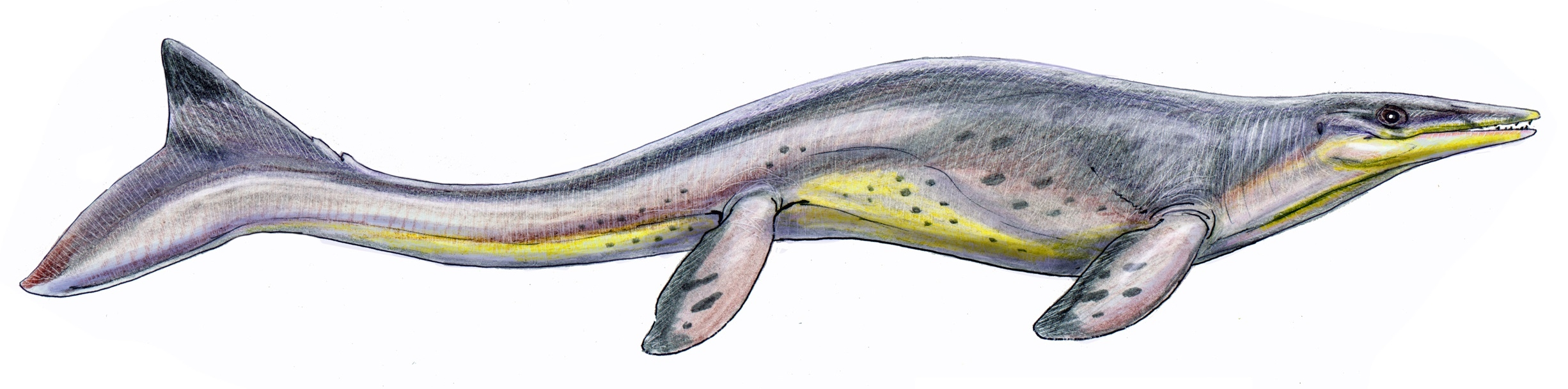
Tylosaurus, a type of large marine lizards known as mosasaurs

The Early Cretaceous Epoch spans from 145 million to 100 million years ago. Dinosaurs continued to be abundant, with groups such as tyrannosauroids, avialans (birds), marginocephalians, and ornithopods seeing early glimpses of later success. Other tetrapods, such as stegosaurs and ichthyosaurs, declined significantly, and sauropods were restricted to southern continents.

The Late Cretaceous Epoch spans from 100 million to 66 million years ago. The Late Cretaceous featured a cooling trend that would continue into the Cenozoic Era. Eventually, the tropical climate was restricted to the equator and areas beyond the tropic lines featured more seasonal climates. Dinosaurs still thrived as new species such as Tyrannosaurus, Ankylosaurus, Triceratops and hadrosaurs dominated the food web. Whether or not pterosaurs went into a decline as birds radiated is debated; however, many families survived until the end of the Cretaceous, alongside new forms such as the gigantic Quetzalcoatlus. Mammals diversified despite their small sizes, with metatherians (marsupials and kin) and eutherians (placentals and kin) coming into their own. In the oceans, mosasaurs diversified to fill the role of the now-extinct ichthyosaurs, alongside huge plesiosaurs such as Elasmosaurus. Also, the first flowering plants evolved. At the end of the Cretaceous, the Deccan Traps and other volcanic eruptions were poisoning the atmosphere. As this was continued, it is thought that a large meteor smashed into Earth, creating the Chicxulub Crater and causing the event known as the K–Pg extinction, the fifth and most recent mass extinction event, during which 75% of life on Earth became extinct, including all non-avian dinosaurs. Every living thing with a body mass over 10 kilograms became extinct, and the Age of Dinosaurs came to an end.

=== Cenozoic Era ===
The Cenozoic featured the rise of mammals and birds as the dominant class of animals, as the end of the Age of Dinosaurs left significant open niches. There are three divisions of the Cenozoic: Paleogene, Neogene and Quaternary.

==== Paleogene Period ====
The Paleogene spans from the extinction of the non-avian dinosaurs, some 66 million years ago, to the dawn of the Neogene 23 million years ago. It features three epochs: Paleocene, Eocene and Oligocene.

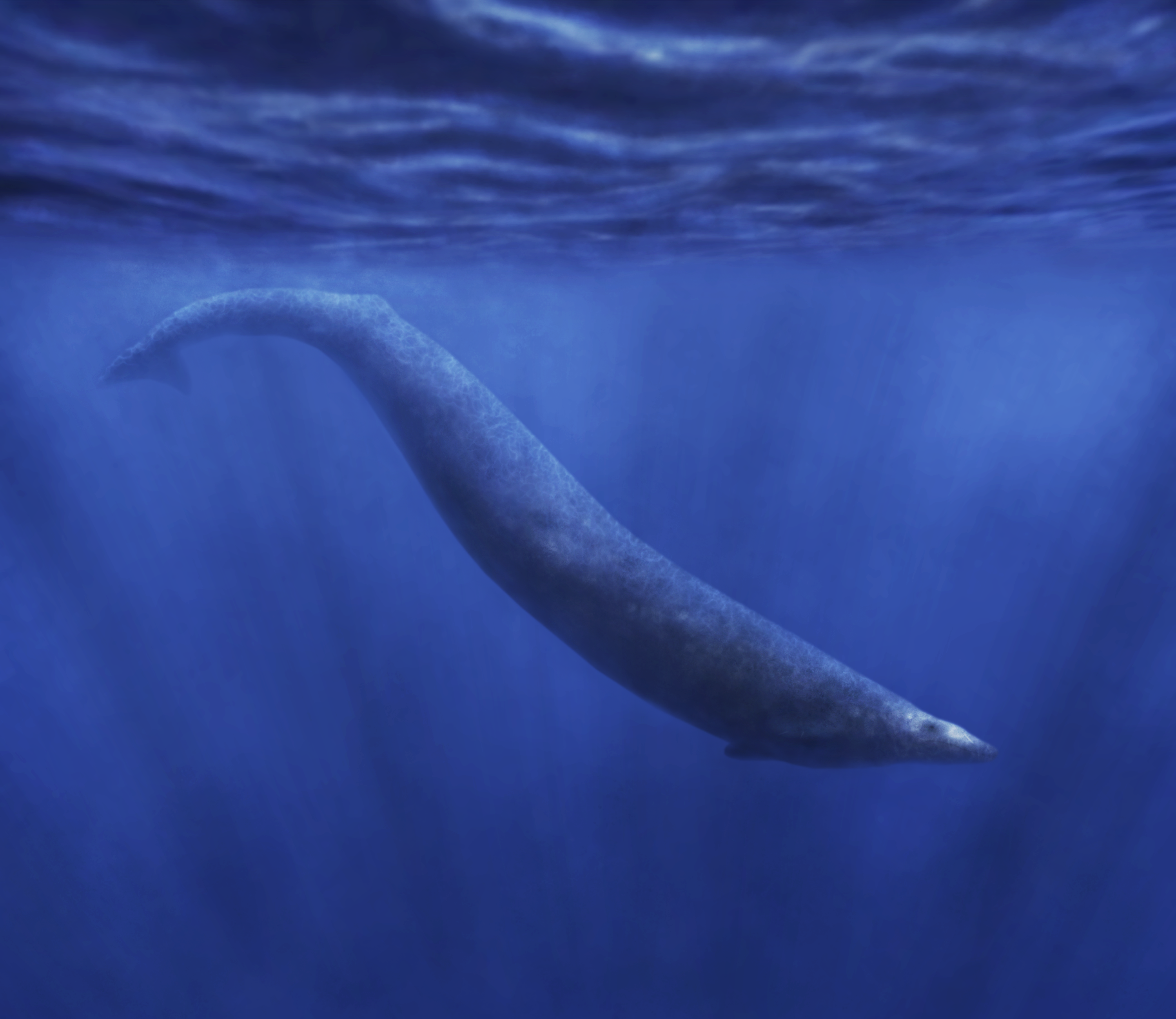
Basilosaurus was an early cetacean, related to modern whales

The Paleocene Epoch began with the K–Pg extinction event, and the early part of the Paleocene saw the recovery of the Earth from that event. The continents began to take their modern shapes, but most continents (and India) remained separated from each other: Africa and Eurasia were separated by the Tethys Sea, and the Americas were separated by the Panamanic Seaway (as the Isthmus of Panama had not yet formed). This epoch featured a general warming trend that peaked at the Paleocene-Eocene Thermal Maximum, and the earliest modern jungles expanded, eventually reaching the poles. The oceans were dominated by sharks, as the large reptiles that had once ruled had become extinct. Mammals diversified rapidly, but most remained small. The largest tetrapod carnivores during the Paleocene were reptiles, including crocodyliforms, choristoderans and snakes. Titanoboa, the largest known snake, lived in South America during the Paleocene.

The Eocene Epoch ranged from 56 million to 34 million years ago. In the early Eocene, most land mammals were small and living in cramped jungles, much like the Paleocene. Among them were early primates, whales and horses along with many other early forms of mammals. The climate was warm and humid, with little temperature gradient from pole to pole. In the Middle Eocene Epoch, the Antarctic Circumpolar Current formed when South America and Australia both separated from Antarctica to open up the Drake Passage and Tasmanian Passage, disrupting ocean currents worldwide, resulting in global cooling and causing the jungles to shrink. More modern forms of mammals continued to diversify with the cooling climate even as more archaic forms died out. By the end of the Eocene, whales such as Basilosaurus had become fully aquatic. The late Eocene Epoch saw the rebirth of seasons, which caused the expansion of savanna-like areas with the earliest substantial grasslands. At the transition between the Eocene and Oligocene epochs there was a significant extinction event, the cause of which is debated.

The Oligocene Epoch spans from 34 million to 23 million years ago. The Oligocene was an important transitional period between the tropical world of the Eocene and more modern ecosystems. This period featured a global expansion of grass which led to many new species taking advantage, including the first elephants, felines, canines, marsupials and many other species still prevalent today. Many other species of plants evolved during this epoch also, such as the evergreen trees. The long term cooling continued and seasonal rain patterns established. Mammals continued to grow larger. Paraceratherium, one of the largest land mammals to ever live, evolved during this epoch, along with many other perissodactyls.

==== Neogene Period ====
The Neogene spans from 23.03 million to 2.58 million years ago. It features two epochs: the Miocene and the Pliocene.

The Miocene spans from 23.03 million to 5.333 million years ago and is a period in which grass spread further across, effectively dominating a large portion of the world, diminishing forests in the process. Kelp forests evolved, leading to the evolution of new species such as sea otters. During this time, perissodactyls thrived, and evolved into many different varieties. Alongside them were the apes, which evolved into 30 species. Overall, arid and mountainous land dominated most of the world, as did grazers. The Tethys Sea finally closed with the creation of the Arabian Peninsula and in its wake left the Black, Red, Mediterranean and Caspian seas. This only increased aridity. Many new plants evolved, and 95% of modern seed plants evolved in the mid-Miocene.

The Pliocene lasted from 5.333 million to 2.58 million years ago. The Pliocene featured dramatic climatic changes, which ultimately led to modern species and plants. The Mediterranean Sea dried up for hundreds of thousands of years in the Messinian salinity crisis. Along with these major geological events, Africa saw the appearance of Australopithecus, the ancestor of Homo. The Isthmus of Panama formed, and animals migrated between North and South America, wreaking havoc on the local ecology. Climatic changes brought savannas that are still continuing to spread across the world, Indian monsoons, deserts in East Asia, and the beginnings of the Sahara Desert. The Earth's continents and seas moved into their present shapes. The world map has not changed much since, save for changes brought about by the Quaternary glaciation such as Lake Agassiz (precursor of the Great Lakes).

==== Quaternary Period ====
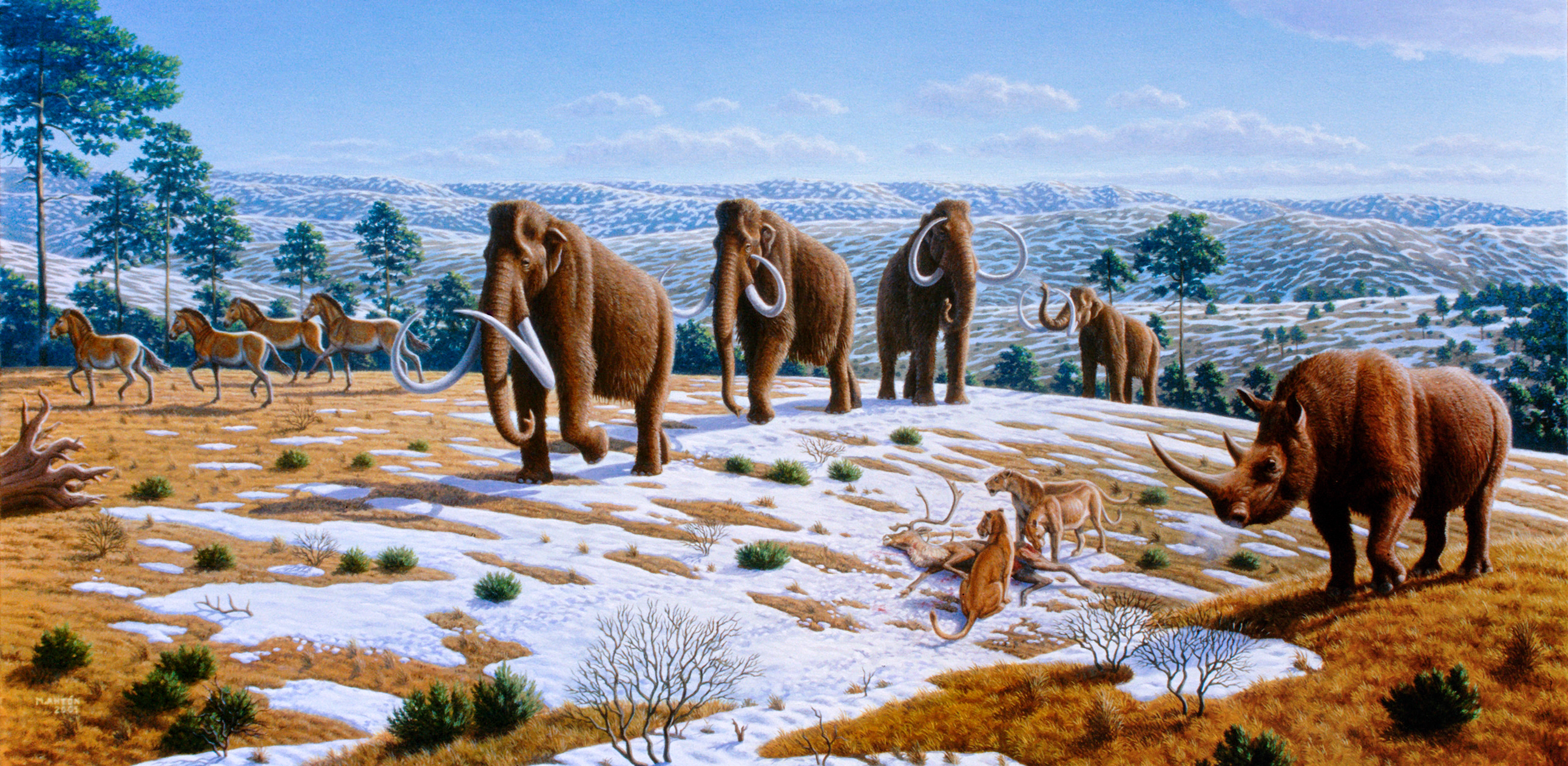
Megafauna of the Pleistocene (mammoths, cave lions, woolly rhinoceros, reindeer, horses)

The Quaternary spans from 2.58 million years ago to present day, and is the shortest geological period in the Phanerozoic Eon. It features modern animals, and dramatic changes in the climate. It is divided into two epochs: the Pleistocene and the Holocene.

The Pleistocene lasted from 2.58 million to 11,700 years ago. This epoch was marked by a series of glacial periods (ice ages) as a result of the cooling trend that started in the mid-Eocene. There were numerous separate glaciation periods marked by the advance of ice caps as far south as 40 degrees N latitude in mountainous areas. Meanwhile, Africa experienced a trend of desiccation which resulted in the creation of the Sahara, Namib and Kalahari deserts. Mammoths, giant ground sloths, dire wolves, sabre-toothed cats and archaic humans such as Homo erectus were common and widespread during the Pleistocene. A more anatomically modern human, Homo sapiens, began migrating out of East Africa in at least two waves, the first being as early as 270,000 years ago. After a supervolcano eruption in Sumatra 74,000 years ago caused a global population bottleneck of humans, a second wave of Homo sapiens migration successfully repopulated every continent except Antarctica. As the Pleistocene drew to a close, a major extinction wiped out much of the world's megafauna, including non-Homo sapiens human species such as Homo neanderthalensis and Homo floresiensis. All the continents were affected, but Africa was impacted to a lesser extent and retained many large animals such as elephants, rhinoceros and hippopotamus. The extent to which Homo sapiens were involved in this megafaunal extinction is debated.

The Holocene began 11,700 years ago at the end of Younger Dryas and lasts until the present day. All recorded history and so-called "human history" lies within the boundaries of the Holocene epoch. Human activity is blamed for an ongoing mass extinction that began roughly 10,000 years ago, though the species becoming extinct have only been recorded since the Industrial Revolution. This is sometimes referred to as the "Sixth Extinction" with hundreds of species gone extinct due to human activities such as overhunting, habitat destruction and introduction of invasive species.

== Biodiversity ==
Evolutionary radiations during the Phanerozoic.

During the Phanerozoic, biodiversity shows an overall but not monotonic increase from near zero to several thousands of genera

It has been demonstrated that changes in biodiversity through the Phanerozoic correlate much better with the hyperbolic model (widely used in demography and macrosociology) than with exponential and logistic models (traditionally used in population biology and extensively applied to fossil biodiversity as well). The latter models imply that changes in diversity are guided by a first-order positive feedback (more ancestors, more descendants) or a negative feedback that arises from resource limitation, or both. The hyperbolic model implies a second-order positive feedback. The hyperbolic pattern of the human population growth arises from quadratic positive feedback, caused by the interaction of the population size and the rate of technological growth. The character of biodiversity growth in the Phanerozoic Eon can be similarly accounted for by a feedback between the diversity and community structure complexity. It has been suggested that the similarity between the curves of biodiversity and human population probably comes from the fact that both are derived from the superposition on the hyperbolic trend of cyclical and random dynamics.

During extinction events in the Phanerozoic, species that could move east to west or vice versa along geographic corridors were much less likely to survive than those living in a palaeogeographic context permitting north to south movement. This was because the latter group could move with their favoured climatic zone much more readily as the global climate changed and climatic zones shifted in latitude.

== Climate ==
Across the Phanerozoic, the dominant driver of long-term climatic change was the concentration of carbon dioxide in the atmosphere, though some studies have suggested a decoupling of carbon dioxide and palaeotemperature, particularly during cold intervals of the Phanerozoic. Phanerozoic carbon dioxide concentrations have been governed partially by a 26 million year oceanic crustal cycle. Since the Devonian, large swings in carbon dioxide of 2,000 ppm or more were uncommon over short timescales. Variations in global temperature were limited by negative feedbacks in the phosphorus cycle, wherein increased phosphorus input into the ocean would increase surficial biological productivity that would in turn enhance iron redox cycling and thus remove phosphorus from seawater; this maintained a relatively stable rate of removal of carbon from the atmosphere and ocean via organic carbon burial. The climate also controlled the availability of phosphate through its regulation of rates of continental and seafloor weathering. Major global temperature variations of >7 °C during the Phanerozoic were strongly associated with mass extinctions.

== See also ==
- Paleoclimatology – Study of changes in ancient climate
