= Paleozoic =

First era of the Phanerozoic Eon

- 538.8 ± 0.6 – 251.902 ± 0.024 Ma

Chronology
An approximate timescale of key Paleozoic events Vertical axis scale: Millions of years ago

Etymology
- Name formality: Formal
- Alternate spelling(s): Palaeozoic

Usage information
- Celestial body: Earth
- Regional usage: Global (ICS)
- Time scale(s) used: ICS Time Scale

Definition
- Chronological unit: Era
- Stratigraphic unit: Erathem
- Lower boundary definition: Appearance of the Ichnofossil Treptichnus pedum
- Lower boundary GSSP: Fortune Head section, Newfoundland, Canada; 47.0762°N 55.8310°W
- Lower GSSP ratified: August 1992 (as base of Cambrian)
- Upper boundary definition: First appearance of the Conodont Hindeodus parvus.
- Upper boundary GSSP: Meishan, Zhejiang, China; 31.0798°N 119.7058°E
- Upper GSSP ratified: March 2001

The Paleozoic (/ˌpæli.əˈzoʊ.ɪk, -i.oʊ-, ˌpeɪ-/ PAL-ee-ə-ZOH-ik, -ee-oh-, PAY-; or Palaeozoic) Era is the first of three geological eras of the Phanerozoic Eon. Beginning 538.8 million years ago (Ma), it succeeds the Neoproterozoic (the last era of the Proterozoic Eon) and ends 251.902 Ma at the start of the Mesozoic Era. The Paleozoic is subdivided into six geologic periods, (from oldest to youngest) Cambrian, Ordovician, Silurian, Devonian, Carboniferous and Permian. Some geological timescales divide the Paleozoic informally into early and late sub-eras: the Early Paleozoic consisting of the Cambrian, Ordovician and Silurian; the Late Paleozoic consisting of the Devonian, Carboniferous and Permian.

The name Paleozoic was first used by Adam Sedgwick (1785–1873) in 1838 to describe the Cambrian and Ordovician periods. It was redefined by John Phillips (1800–1874) in 1840 to cover the Cambrian to Permian periods. It is derived from the Greek palaiós (παλαιός, "old"’”ancient”) and zōḗ (ζωή, "life") meaning "ancient life".

The Paleozoic was a time of dramatic geological, climatic, and evolutionary change. The Cambrian witnessed the most rapid and widespread diversification of life in Earth's history, known as the Cambrian explosion, in which most modern phyla first appeared. Arthropods, molluscs, fish, amphibians, reptiles, and synapsids all evolved during the Paleozoic. Life began in the ocean but eventually transitioned onto land, and by the late Paleozoic, great forests of primitive plants covered the continents, many of which formed the coal beds of Europe and eastern North America. Towards the end of the era, large, sophisticated synapsids and diapsids were dominant and the first modern plants (conifers) appeared.

The Paleozoic Era ended with the largest extinction event of the Phanerozoic Eon, (Note: The list of the "big 5" mass extinctions only counts extinctions in the Phanerozoic Eon, since up to the end of the Proterozoic Eon, life was all soft-bodied. The meagre fossil traces of earlier life make it essentially impossible to identify species or genera, and it is the disappearance of large proportions of existing genera from the fossil record that is the standard for comparing extinction events of the Phanerozoic "big 5". The one known extinction event in the eons before the Phanerozoic was the Oxygen Catastrophe, or the Great Oxygenation Event, when the previously anoxic seas were poisoned with oxygen by newly photosynthesizing bacteria. By some estimates, that event killed almost all life on the Earth, and might qualify as the "greatest ever" mass extinction, if its consequences for soft-bodied genera could be measured. Further, there might have been other extinction events in the Precambrian eons, whose traces in the geologic record (if any) are less obvious than the Great Oxygenation Event.) the Permian–Triassic extinction event. The effects of this catastrophe were so devastating that it took life on land 30 million years into the Mesozoic Era to recover. Recovery of life in the sea may have been much faster.

== Boundaries ==
The base of the Paleozoic is one of the major divisions in geological time representing the divide between the Proterozoic and Phanerozoic eons, the Neoproterozoic and Paleozoic eras, and the Ediacaran and Cambrian periods. When Adam Sedgwick named the Paleozoic in 1835, he defined the base as the first appearance of complex life in the rock record as shown by the presence of trilobite-dominated fauna. Since then evidence of complex life in older rock sequences has increased and by the second half of the 20th century, the first appearance of small shelly fauna (SSF), also known as early skeletal fossils, were considered markers for the base of the Paleozoic. However, whilst SSF are well preserved in carbonate sediments, the majority of Ediacaran to Cambrian rock sequences are composed of siliciclastic rocks where skeletal fossils are rarely preserved. This led the International Commission on Stratigraphy (ICS) to use trace fossils as an indicator of complex life. Unlike later in the fossil record, Cambrian trace fossils are preserved in a wide range of sediments and environments, which aids correlation between different sites around the world. Trace fossils reflect the complexity of the body plan of the organism that made them. Ediacaran trace fossils are simple, sub-horizontal feeding traces. As more complex organisms evolved, their more complex behaviour was reflected in greater diversity and complexity of the trace fossils they left behind. After two decades of deliberation, the ICS chose Fortune Head, Burin Peninsula, Newfoundland as the basal Cambrian Global Stratotype Section and Point (GSSP) at the base of the Treptichnus pedum assemblage of trace fossils and immediately above the last occurrence of the Ediacaran problematica fossils Harlaniella podolica and Palaeopsacichnus. The base of the Phanerozoic, Paleozoic and Cambrian is dated at 538.8 ± 0.6 Ma and now lies below both the first appearance of trilobites and SSF.

The boundary between the Paleozoic and Mesozoic eras and the Permian and Triassic periods is marked by the first occurrence of the conodont Hindeodus parvus. This is the first biostratigraphic event found worldwide that is associated with the beginning of the recovery following the end-Permian mass extinctions and environmental changes. In non-marine strata, the equivalent level is marked by the disappearance of the Permian Dicynodon tetrapods. This means events previously considered to mark the Permian-Triassic boundary, such as the eruption of the Siberian Traps flood basalts, the onset of greenhouse climate, ocean anoxia and acidification and the resulting mass extinction are now regarded as being of latest Permian in age. The GSSP is near Meishan, Zhejiang Province, southern China. Radiometric dating of volcanic clay layers just above and below the boundary confine its age to a narrow range of 251.902 ± 0.024 Ma.

== Geology ==
The beginning of the Paleozoic Era witnessed the breakup of the supercontinent of Pannotia and ended while the supercontinent Pangaea was assembling. The breakup of Pannotia began with the opening of the Iapetus Ocean and other Cambrian seas and coincided with a dramatic rise in sea level. Paleoclimatic studies and evidence of glaciers indicate that Central Africa was most likely in the polar regions during the early Paleozoic. The breakup of Pannotia was followed by the assembly of the huge continent Gondwana (510 million years ago). By the mid-Paleozoic, the collision of North America and Europe produced the Acadian-Caledonian uplifts, and a subducting plate uplifted eastern Australia. By the late Paleozoic, continental collisions formed the supercontinent of Pangaea and created great mountain chains, including the Appalachians, Caledonides, Ural Mountains, and mountains of Tasmania.

=== Cambrian Period ===
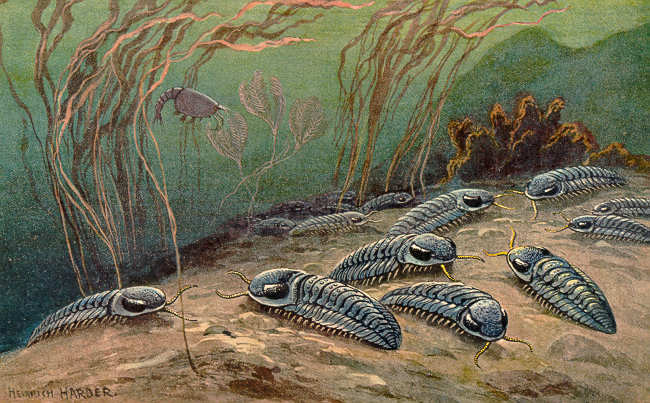
Trilobites

The Cambrian spanned from 539 to 487 million years ago. It saw a dramatic speeding up of evolution, in an event known as the Cambrian explosion, when almost all modern phyla (basic body plans) first appeared in the fossil record. They included brachiopods, molluscs and arthropods such as trilobites. Life was confined to the sea, with no plants or land animals. The climate was warm with no glaciation and high sea levels. The supercontinent Rodinia had broken up, and landmasses were scattered, with some coalescing in the future Gondwana supercontinent.

=== Ordovician Period ===
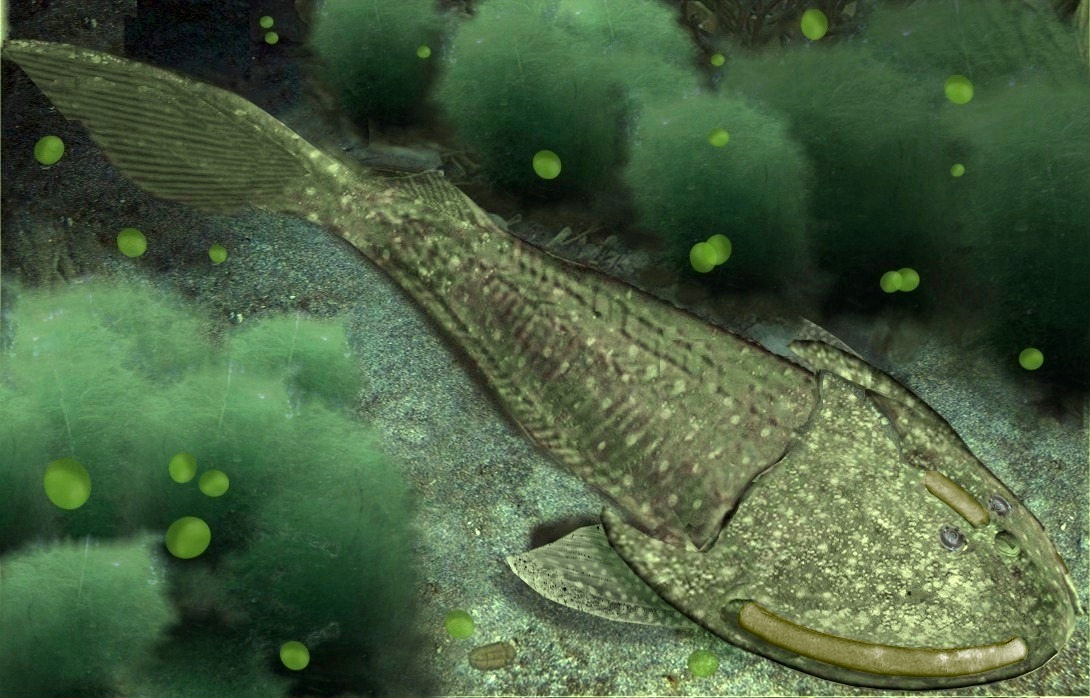
Cephalaspis (a jawless fish)

The Ordovician spanned from 485 to 444 million years ago. The Ordovician was a time in Earth's history in which many of the biological classes still prevalent today evolved, such as primitive fish, cephalopods, and coral. The most common forms of life, however, were trilobites, snails and shellfish. The first arthropods went ashore to colonize the empty continent of Gondwana. By the end of the Ordovician, Gondwana was at the south pole, early North America had collided with Europe, closing the intervening ocean. Glaciation of Africa resulted in a major drop in sea level, killing off all life that had established along coastal Gondwana. Glaciation may have caused the Ordovician–Silurian extinction events, in which 60% of marine invertebrates and 25% of families became extinct, and is considered the first Phanerozoic mass extinction event, and the second deadliest.

=== Silurian Period ===
The Silurian spanned from 444 to 419 million years ago. The Silurian saw the rejuvenation of life as the Earth recovered from the previous glaciation. This period saw the mass evolution of fish, as jawless fish became more numerous, jawed fish evolved, and the first freshwater fish evolved, though arthropods, such as sea scorpions, were still apex predators. Fully terrestrial life evolved, including early arachnids, fungi, and centipedes. The evolution of vascular plants (Cooksonia) allowed plants to gain a foothold on land. These early plants were the forerunners of all plant life on land. During this time, there were four continents: Gondwana (Africa, South America, Australia, Antarctica, Siberia), Laurentia (North America), Baltica (Northern Europe), and Avalonia (Western Europe). The recent rise in sea levels allowed many new species to thrive in water.

=== Devonian Period ===
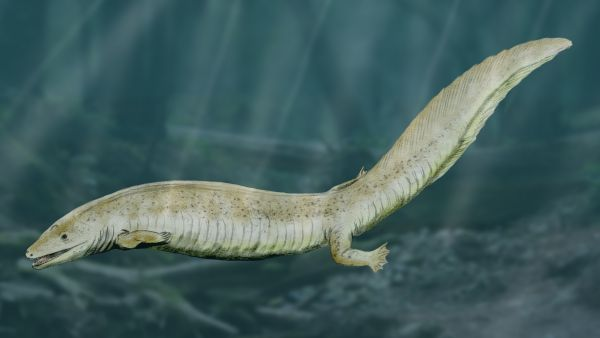
Eogyrinus (an amphibian) of the Carboniferous

The Devonian spanned from 419 to 359 million years ago. Also known as "The Age of the Fish", the Devonian featured a huge diversification of fish, including armored fish like Dunkleosteus and lobe-finned fish which eventually evolved into the first tetrapods. On land, plant groups diversified rapidly in an event known as the Devonian explosion when plants made lignin, leading to taller growth and vascular tissue; the first trees and seeds evolved. These new habitats led to greater arthropod diversification. The first amphibians appeared and fish occupied the top of the food chain. Earth's second Phanerozoic mass extinction event (a group of several smaller extinction events), the Late Devonian extinction, ended 70% of existing species.

=== Carboniferous Period ===
The Carboniferous is named after the large coal deposits laid down during the period. It spanned from 359 to 299 million years ago. During this time, average global temperatures were exceedingly high; the early Carboniferous averaged at about 20 degrees Celsius (but cooled to 10 °C during the Middle Carboniferous). An important evolutionary development of the time was the evolution of amniotic eggs, which allowed amphibians to move farther inland and remain the dominant vertebrates for the duration of this period. Also, the first reptiles and synapsids evolved in the swamps. Throughout the Carboniferous, there was a cooling trend, which led to the Permo-Carboniferous glaciation or the Carboniferous Rainforest Collapse. Gondwana was glaciated as much of it was situated around the south pole.

=== Permian Period ===
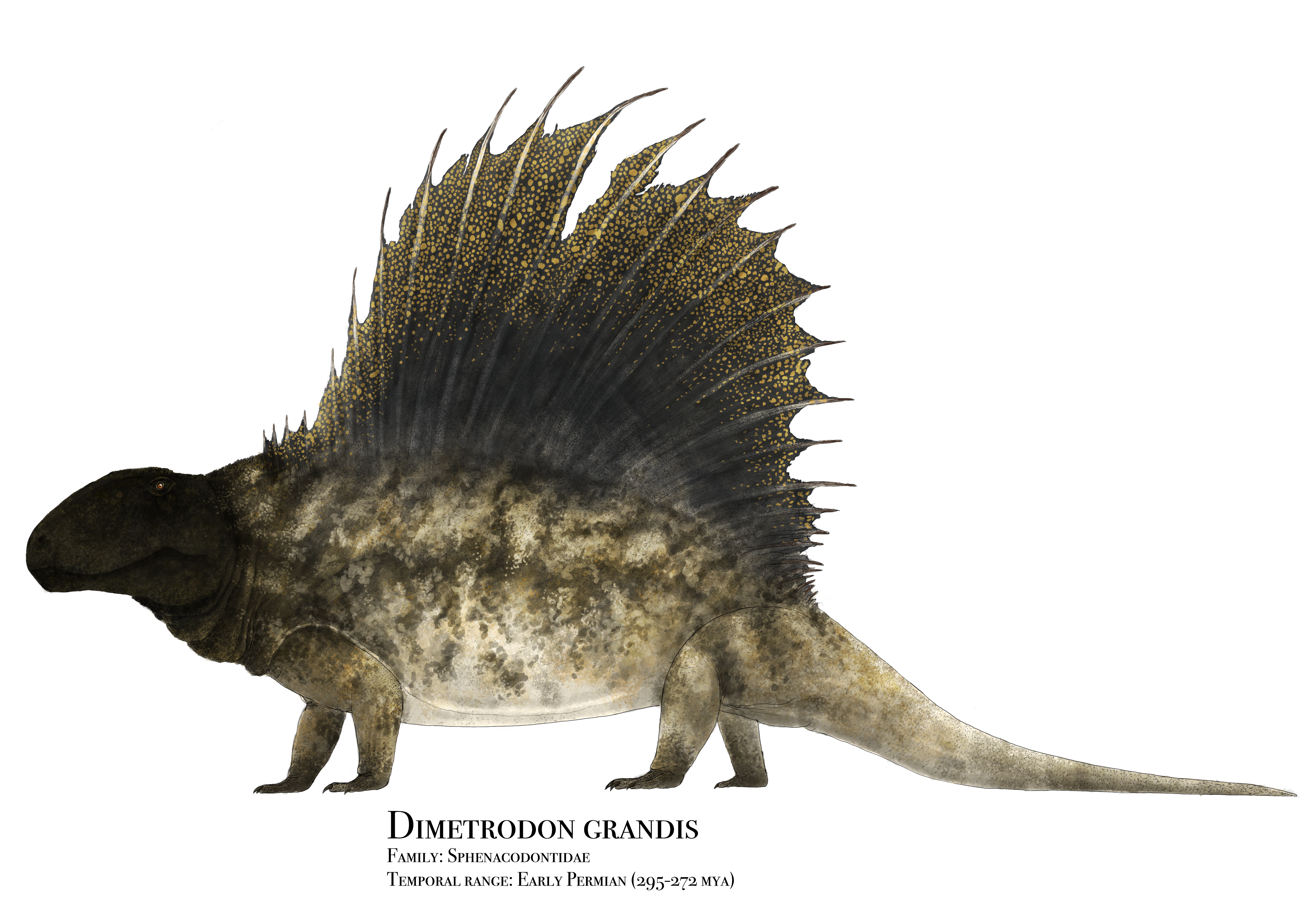
Synapsid: Dimetrodon grandis

The Permian spanned from 299 to 252 million years ago and was the last period of the Paleozoic Era. At the beginning of this period, all continents joined to form the supercontinent Pangaea, which was encircled by one ocean called Panthalassa. The land mass was very dry during this time, with harsh seasons, as the climate of the interior of Pangaea was not regulated by large bodies of water. Diapsids and synapsids flourished in the new dry climate. Creatures such as Dimetrodon and Edaphosaurus ruled the new continent. The first conifers evolved, and dominated the terrestrial landscape. Near the end of the Permian, Pangaea grew drier. The interior was desert, and new taxa such as Scutosaurus and Gorgonopsids filled it. Eventually they disappeared, along with 95% of all life on Earth, in a cataclysm known as "The Great Dying", the third and most severe Phanerozoic mass extinction.

== Climate ==
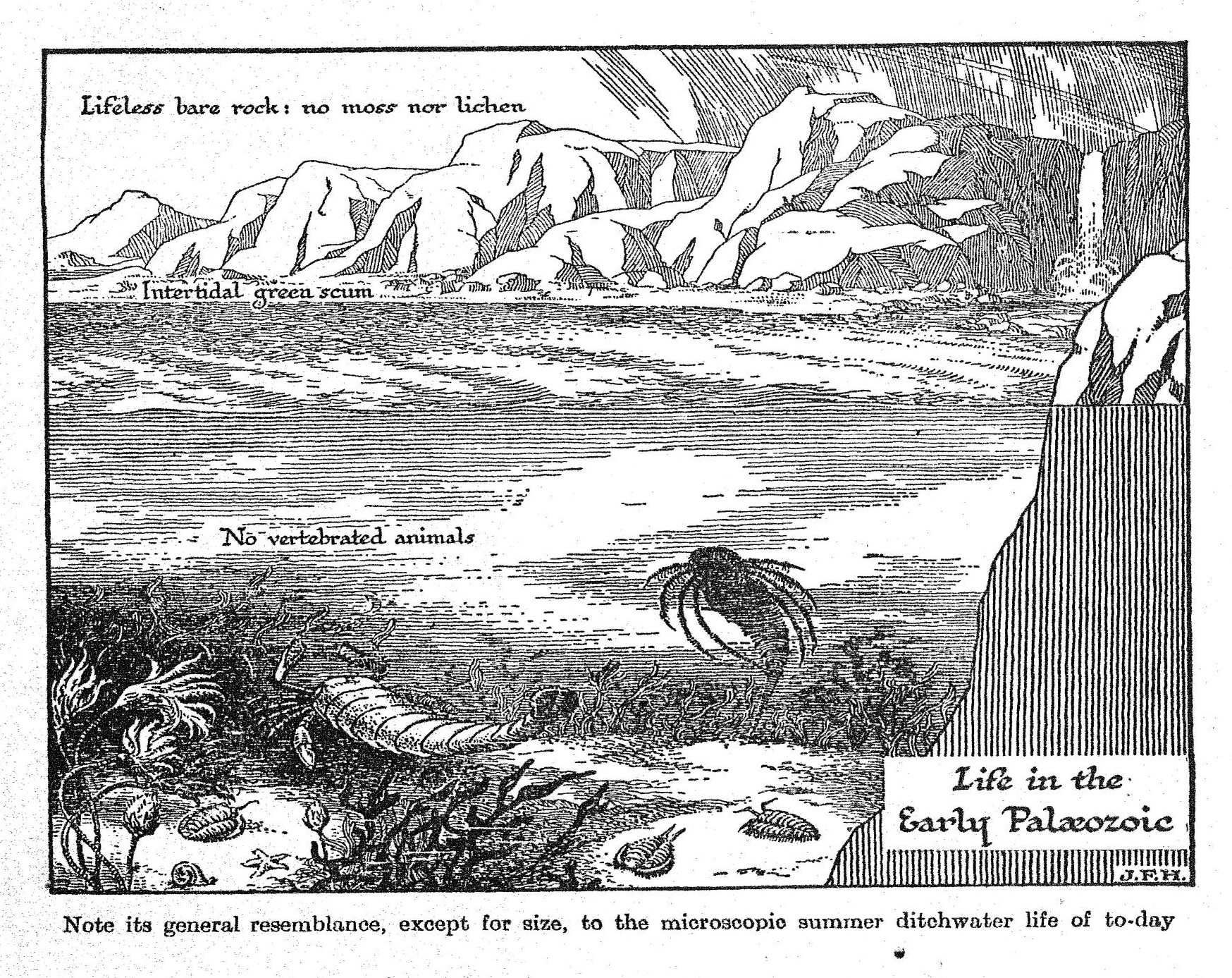
Life in the early Paleozoic

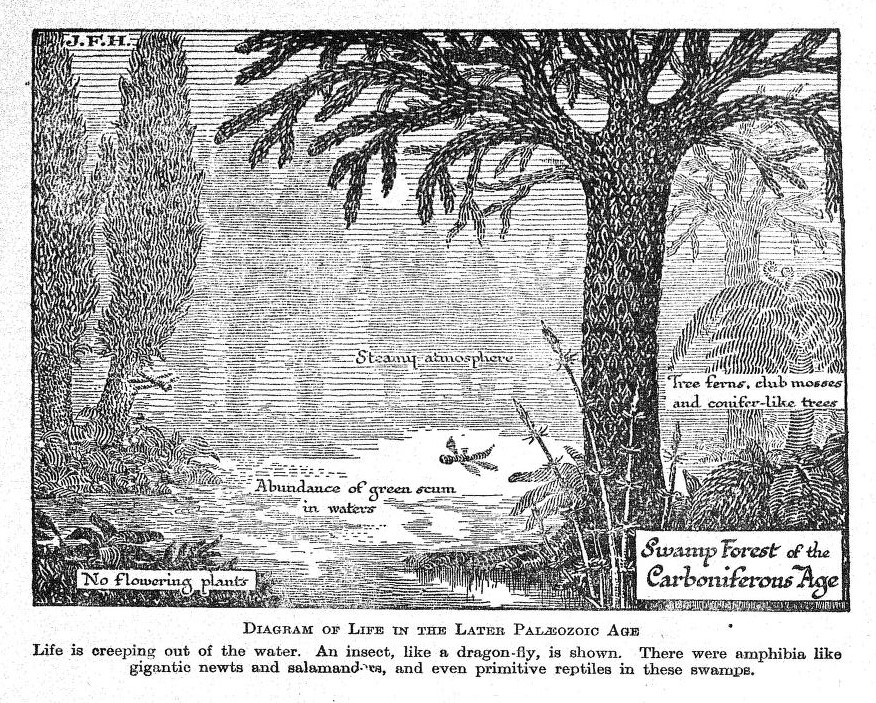
Swamp forest in the Carboniferous

The early Cambrian climate was probably moderate at first, becoming warmer over the course of the Cambrian, as the second-greatest sustained sea level rise in the Phanerozoic got underway. However, as if to offset this trend, Gondwana moved south, so that, in Ordovician time, most of West Gondwana (Africa and South America) lay directly over the South Pole.

The early Paleozoic climate was strongly zonal, with the result that the "climate", in an abstract sense, became warmer, but the living space of most organisms of the time – the continental shelf marine environment – became steadily colder. However, Baltica (Northern Europe and Russia) and Laurentia (eastern North America and Greenland) remained in the tropical zone, while China and Australia lay in waters which were at least temperate. The early Paleozoic ended, rather abruptly, with the short, but apparently severe, late Ordovician ice age. This cold spell caused the second-greatest mass extinction of the Phanerozoic Eon. Over time, the warmer weather moved into the Paleozoic Era.

The Ordovician and Silurian were warm greenhouse periods, with the highest sea levels of the Paleozoic (200 m above today's); the warm climate was interrupted only by a 30 million year cool period, the Early Paleozoic Icehouse, culminating in the Hirnantian glaciation, 445 million years ago at the end of the Ordovician.

The middle Paleozoic was a time of considerable stability. Sea levels had dropped coincident with the ice age, but slowly recovered over the course of the Silurian and Devonian. The slow merger of Baltica and Laurentia, and the northward movement of bits and pieces of Gondwana created numerous new regions of relatively warm, shallow sea floor. As plants took hold on the continental margins, oxygen levels increased and carbon dioxide dropped, although much less dramatically. The north–south temperature gradient also seems to have moderated, or metazoan life simply became hardier, or both. At any event, the far southern continental margins of Antarctica and West Gondwana became increasingly less barren. The Devonian ended with a series of turnover pulses which killed off much of middle Paleozoic vertebrate life, without noticeably reducing species diversity overall.

There are many unanswered questions about the late Paleozoic. The Mississippian (early Carboniferous Period) began with a spike in atmospheric oxygen, while carbon dioxide plummeted to new lows. This destabilized the climate and led to one, and perhaps two, ice ages during the Carboniferous. These were far more severe than the brief Late Ordovician ice age; but, this time, the effects on world biota were inconsequential. By the Cisuralian Epoch, both oxygen and carbon dioxide had recovered to more normal levels. On the other hand, the assembly of Pangaea created huge arid inland areas subject to temperature extremes. The Lopingian Epoch is associated with falling sea levels, increased carbon dioxide and general climatic deterioration, culminating in the devastation of the Permian extinction.

=== Paleozoic Oxidation Event ===
The increase in atmospheric oxygen between 470 Ma to 400 Ma is known as the Paleozoic Oxidation Event and is explained by the colonisation of land by the first plants (from about 470 Ma to 445 Ma) which trapped organic carbon within sedimentary rocks, reducing the oxygen sink. Fall of CO_{2} levels (with O_{2} being freed up into the atmosphere and carbon being trapped in rocks) also caused climate cooling.

Oxygen levels during the last 1 billion years

This also marks the first time fire could be supported by Earth's atmosphere (as evidenced by charcoal deposits from the Silurian Period) with O_{2} levels crossing the 15% mark.

Deep sea oxygenation was initially sporadic and changed intensely, only stabilising and resembling modern levels after 380 Ma, unlike the surface oceans which had been oxygenated since 2.3 Ga.

== Flora ==
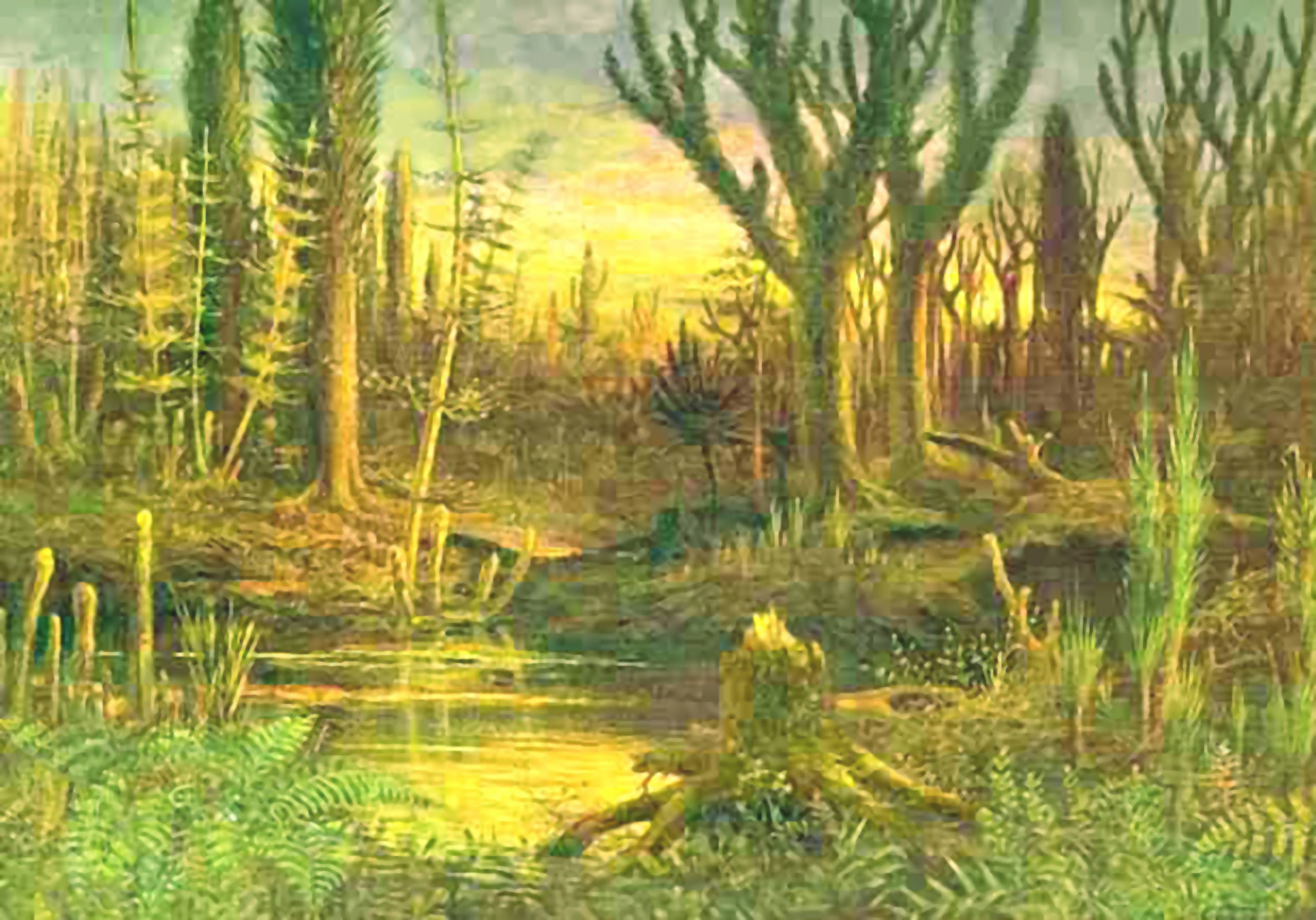
An artist's impression of early land plants

While macroscopic plant life appeared early in the Paleozoic Era and possibly late in the Neoproterozoic Era of the earlier eon, plants mostly remained aquatic until the Silurian Period, about 420 million years ago, when they began to transition onto dry land. Terrestrial flora reached its climax in the Carboniferous, when towering lycopsid rainforests dominated the tropical belt of Euramerica. Climate change caused the Carboniferous Rainforest Collapse which fragmented this habitat, diminishing the diversity of plant life in the late Carboniferous and Permian periods.

== Fauna ==
Paleozoic Fauna

A noteworthy feature of Paleozoic life is the sudden appearance of nearly all of the invertebrate animal phyla in great abundance at the beginning of the Cambrian. The first vertebrates appeared in the form of primitive fish, which greatly diversified in the Silurian and Devonian Periods. The first animals to venture onto dry land were the arthropods. Some fish had lungs, and powerful bony fins that in the late Devonian, 367.5 million years ago, allowed them to crawl onto land. The bones in their fins eventually evolved into legs and they became the first tetrapods, 390 million years ago, and began to develop lungs. Amphibians were the dominant tetrapods until the mid-Carboniferous, when climate change greatly reduced their diversity, allowing amniotes to take over. Amniotes would split into two clades shortly after their origin in the Carboniferous; the synapsids, which was the dominant group, and the sauropsids. The synapsids continued to prosper and increase in number and variety till the end of the Permian period. In late middle Permian the pareiasaurs originated, successful herbivores and the only sauropsids that could reach sizes comparable to some of the largest synapsids.

The Paleozoic marine fauna was notably lacking in predators relative to the present day. Predators made up about 4% of the fauna in Paleozoic assemblages while making up 17% of temperate Cenozoic assemblages and 31% of tropical ones. Infaunal animals made up 4% of soft substrate Paleozoic communities but about 47% of Cenozoic communities. Additionally, the Paleozoic had very few facultatively motile animals that could easily adjust to disturbance, with such creatures composing 1% of its assemblages in contrast to 50% in Cenozoic faunal assemblages. Non-motile animals untethered to the substrate, extremely rare in the Cenozoic, were abundant in the Paleozoic.

== Microbiota ==
Paleozoic phytoplankton overall were both nutrient-poor themselves and adapted to nutrient-poor environmental conditions. This phytoplankton nutrient poverty has been cited as an explanation for the Paleozoic's relatively low biodiversity.

== See also ==
- Geologic time scale – System that relates geologic strata to time
- Precambrian – History of Earth 4600–539 million years ago
