= Proterozoic =

Geologic eon, 2500–539 million years ago

- 2500 – 538.8 ± 0.6 Ma
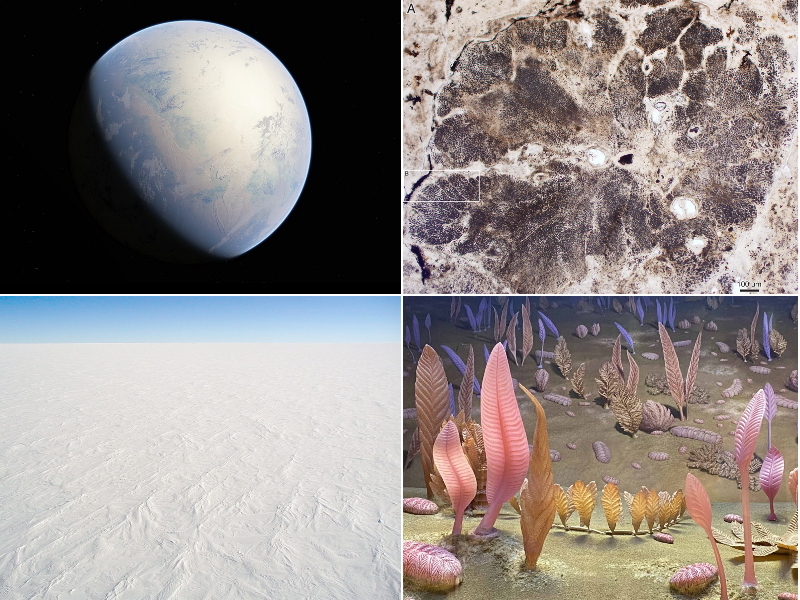
- From left to right: Four main Proterozoic events: Great Oxidation Event and subsequent Huronian glaciation; First eukaryotes, like red algae; Snowball Earth in Cryogenian period; Ediacaran biota

Chronology
Vertical axis scale: Millions of years ago

Etymology
- Name formality: Formal

Usage information
- Celestial body: Earth
- Regional usage: Global (ICS)
- Time scale(s) used: ICS Time Scale

Definition
- Chronological unit: Eon
- Stratigraphic unit: Eonothem
- Time span formality: Formal
- Lower boundary definition: Defined Chronometrically
- Lower GSSA ratified: 1990
- Upper boundary definition: Appearance of the Ichnofossil Treptichnus pedum
- Upper boundary GSSP: Fortune Head section, Newfoundland, Canada; 47.0762°N 55.8310°W
- Upper GSSP ratified: August 1992 (as base of Cambrian)

The Proterozoic (IPA: /ˌproʊtərəˈzoʊɪk, ˌprɒt-, -əroʊ-, -trə-, -troʊ-/ PROH-tər-ə-ZOH-ik, PROT-, -ər-oh-, -trə-, -troh-) is the third of the four geologic eons of Earth's history, spanning the time interval from 2500 to 538.8 Ma, and is the longest eon of Earth's geologic time scale. It is preceded by the Archean and followed by the Phanerozoic, and is the most recent part of the Precambrian "supereon".

The Proterozoic is subdivided into three geologic eras (from oldest to youngest): the Paleoproterozoic, Mesoproterozoic and Neoproterozoic. It covers the time from the appearance of free oxygen in Earth's atmosphere to just before the proliferation of complex life on the Earth during the Cambrian Explosion. The name Proterozoic combines two words of Greek origin: protero- meaning "former, earlier", and -zoic, meaning "of life".

Well-identified events of this eon were the transition to an oxygenated atmosphere during the Paleoproterozoic; the evolution of eukaryotes via symbiogenesis; several global glaciations, which produced the 300 million years-long Huronian glaciation (during the Siderian and Rhyacian periods of the Paleoproterozoic) and the hypothesized Snowball Earth (during the Cryogenian period in the late Neoproterozoic); and the Ediacaran period (635–538.8 Ma), which was characterized by the evolution of abundant soft-bodied multicellular organisms such as sponges, algae, cnidarians, bilaterians and the sessile Ediacaran biota (some of which had evolved sexual reproduction) and provides the first obvious fossil evidence of life on Earth.

== The Proterozoic record ==
The geologic record of the Proterozoic Eon is more complete than that for the preceding Archean Eon. In contrast to the deep-water deposits of the Archean, the Proterozoic features many strata that were laid down in extensive shallow epicontinental seas; furthermore, many of those rocks are less metamorphosed than Archean rocks, and many are unaltered. Studies of these rocks have shown that the eon continued the massive continental accretion that had begun late in the Archean Eon. The Proterozoic Eon also featured the first definitive supercontinent cycles and wholly modern mountain building activity (orogeny).

There is evidence that the first known glaciations occurred during the Proterozoic. The first began shortly after the beginning of the Proterozoic Eon, and evidence of at least four during the Neoproterozoic Era at the end of the Proterozoic Eon, possibly climaxing with the hypothesized Snowball Earth of the Sturtian and Marinoan glaciations.

== The accumulation of oxygen ==
One of the most important events of the Proterozoic was the accumulation of oxygen in the Earth's atmosphere. Though oxygen is believed to have been released by photosynthesis as far back as the Archean Eon, it could not build up to any significant degree until mineral sinks of unoxidized sulfur and iron had been exhausted. Until roughly 2.3 Ga, oxygen was probably only 1% to 2% of its current level. The banded iron formations, which provide most of the world's iron ore, are one mark of that mineral sink process. Their accumulation ceased after 1.9 Ga, after the iron in the oceans had all been oxidized.

Red beds, which are colored by hematite, indicate an increase in atmospheric oxygen 2 Ga. Such massive iron oxide formations are not found in older rocks. The oxygen buildup was probably due to two factors: Exhaustion of the chemical sinks, and an increase in carbon sequestration, which sequestered organic compounds that would have otherwise been oxidized by the atmosphere.

The first surge in atmospheric oxygen at the beginning of the Proterozoic is called the Great Oxygenation Event, or alternately the Oxygen Catastrophe – to reflect the mass extinction of almost all life on Earth, which at the time was virtually all obligate anaerobic. A second, later surge in oxygen concentrations is called the Neoproterozoic Oxygenation Event, occurred during the Middle and Late Neoproterozoic and drove the rapid evolution of multicellular life towards the end of the era.

== Subduction processes ==
The Proterozoic Eon was a very tectonically active period in the Earth's history. Oxygen changed the chemistry allowing for extensive geological changes. Volcanism was also extensive resulting in more geologic changes.

The late Archean Eon to Early Proterozoic Eon corresponds to a period of increasing crustal recycling, suggesting subduction. Evidence for this increased subduction activity comes from the abundance of old granites originating mostly after 2.6 Ga.

The occurrence of eclogite (a type of metamorphic rock created by high pressure, > 1 GPa), is explained using a model that incorporates subduction. The lack of eclogites that date to the Archean Eon suggests that conditions at that time did not favor the formation of high grade metamorphism and therefore did not achieve the same levels of subduction as was occurring in the Proterozoic Eon.

As a result of remelting of basaltic oceanic crust due to subduction, the cores of the first continents grew large enough to withstand the crustal recycling processes.

The long-term tectonic stability of those cratons is why we find continental crust ranging up to a few billion years in age. It is believed that 43% of modern continental crust was formed in the Proterozoic, 39% formed in the Archean, and only 18% in the Phanerozoic. Studies by Condie (2000) and Rino et al. (2004) suggest that crust production happened episodically. By isotopically calculating the ages of Proterozoic granitoids it was determined that there were several episodes of rapid increase in continental crust production. The reason for these pulses is unknown, but they seemed to have decreased in magnitude after every period.

== Supercontinent tectonic history ==
Columbia, about 1,590 Ma

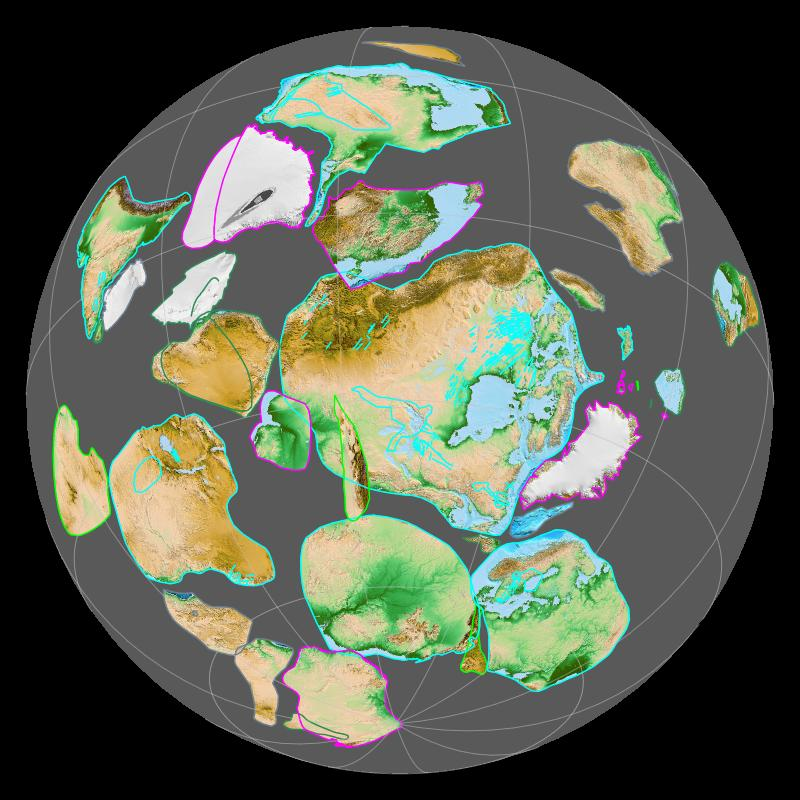
Rodinia, about 900 Ma

Pannotia, 545 Ma (disputed), centered on South Pole

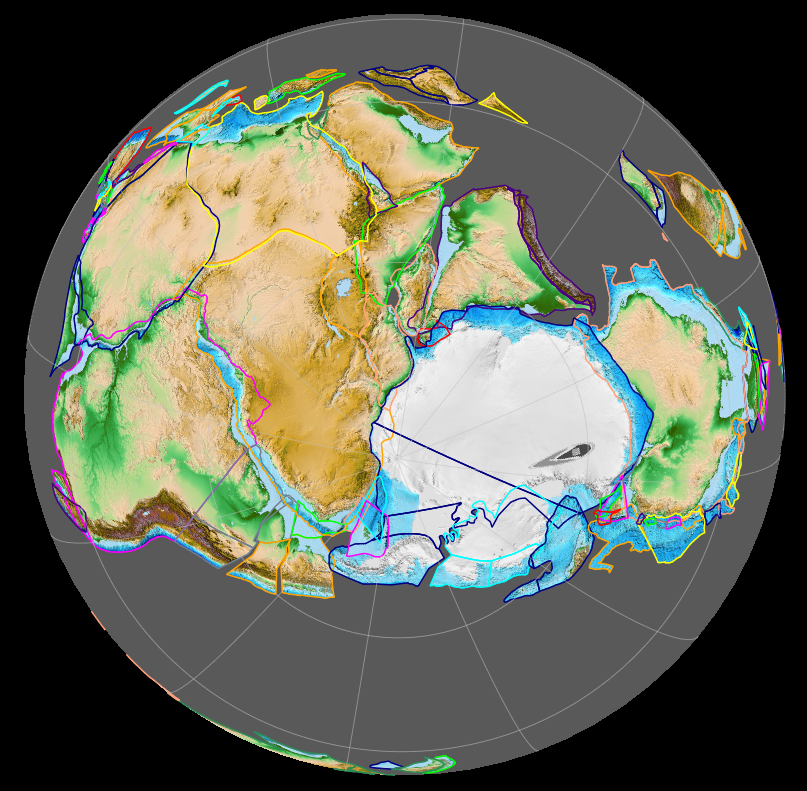
Gondwana 420 Ma, centered on South Pole

Evidence of collision and rifting between continents raises the question as to what exactly were the movements of the Archean cratons composing Proterozoic continents. Paleomagnetic and geochronological dating mechanisms have allowed the deciphering of Precambrian Supereon tectonics. It is known that tectonic processes of the Proterozoic Eon resemble greatly the evidence of tectonic activity, such as orogenic belts or ophiolite complexes, we see today. Hence, most geologists would conclude that the Earth was active at that time. It is also commonly accepted that during the Precambrian, the Earth went through several supercontinent breakup and rebuilding cycles (Wilson cycle).

In the late Proterozoic (most recent), the dominant supercontinent was Rodinia (~1000–750 Ma). It consisted of a series of continents attached to a central craton that forms the core of the North American Continent called Laurentia. An example of an orogeny (mountain building processes) associated with the construction of Rodinia is the Grenville orogeny located in Eastern North America. Rodinia formed after the breakup of the supercontinent Columbia and prior to the assemblage of the supercontinent Gondwana (~500 Ma). The defining orogenic event associated with the formation of Gondwana was the collision of Africa, South America, Antarctica and Australia forming the Pan-African orogeny.

Columbia was dominant in the early-mid Proterozoic and not much is known about continental assemblages before then. There are a few plausible models that explain tectonics of the early Earth prior to the formation of Columbia, but the current most plausible hypothesis is that prior to Columbia, there were only a few independent cratons scattered around the Earth (not necessarily a supercontinent, like Rodinia or Columbia).

== Life ==
Life timeline
← / Earth formed; ← / Earliest water; ← / LUCA; ← / Earliest fossils; ← / Atmospheric oxygen; ← / Sexual reproduction; ← / Earliest fungi; ← / Neoproterozoic oxygenation event; ← / Ediacaran biota; ← / Cambrian explosion; ← / Earliest tetrapods; ← / Earliest hominoid
(million years ago)

The Proterozoic can be roughly divided into seven biostratigraphic zones which correspond to informal time periods. The first was the Labradorian, lasting from 2.0 to 1.65 Ga. It was followed by the Anabarian, which lasted from 1.65 to 1.2 Ga and was itself followed by the Turukhanian from 1.2 to 1.03 Ga. The Turukhanian was succeeded by the Uchuromayan, lasting from 1.03 to 0.85 Ga, which was in turn succeeded by the Yuzhnouralian, lasting from 0.85 to 0.63 Ga. The final two zones were the Amadeusian, spanning the first half of the Ediacaran from 0.63 to 0.55 Ga, and the Belomorian, spanning from 0.55 to 0.542 Ga.

The emergence of advanced single-celled eukaryotes began after the Oxygen Catastrophe. This may have been due to an increase in the oxidized nitrates that eukaryotes use, as opposed to cyanobacteria. It was also during the Proterozoic that the first symbiotic relationships between mitochondria (found in nearly all eukaryotes) and chloroplasts (found in plants and some protists only) and their hosts evolved.

By the late Palaeoproterozoic, eukaryotic organisms had become moderately biodiverse. The blossoming of eukaryotes such as acritarchs did not preclude the expansion of cyanobacteria – in fact, stromatolites reached their greatest abundance and diversity during the Proterozoic, peaking roughly 1.2 Ga.

The earliest fossils possessing features typical of fungi date to the Paleoproterozoic Era, some 2.4 Ga; these multicellular benthic organisms had filamentous structures capable of anastomosis.

The Viridiplantae evolved sometime in the Palaeoproterozoic or Mesoproterozoic, according to molecular data.

Eukaryote fossils from before the Cryogenian are sparse, and there seems to be low and relatively constant rates of species appearance, change, and extinction. This contrasts with the Ediacaran and early Cambrian periods, in which the quantity and variety of speciations, changes, and extinctions exploded.

Classically, the boundary between the Proterozoic and the Phanerozoic eons was set at the base of the Cambrian Period when the first fossils of animals, including trilobites and archeocyathids, as well as the animal-like Caveasphaera, appeared. In the second half of the 20th century, a number of fossil forms have been found in Proterozoic rocks, particularly in ones from the Ediacaran, proving that multicellular life had already become widespread tens of millions of years before the Cambrian Explosion in what is known as the Avalon Explosion. Nonetheless, the upper boundary of the Proterozoic has remained fixed at the base of the Cambrian, which is currently placed at 538.8 Ma.

== See also ==
- Boring Billion
- Timeline of natural history
- Volyn biota
