= Fortune Head =

Headland on the Burin Peninsula, Newfoundland, Canada

Coordinates: 47°04′27″N 55°51′26″W

Location of Fortune Head in Newfoundland

Fortune Head is a headland located about 1.6 km (0.99 mi) from the town of Fortune on the Burin Peninsula, southeastern Newfoundland.

A 140 m (460 ft) thick section of rock along its cliffs is designated the Global Boundary Stratotype Section and Point (or GSSP) representing the boundary between the Precambrian era and the Cambrian period, 538.8 million years ago. Fortune Head was selected in 1992 over similar rock sections in Siberia, Russia, and Meischucum, China. because of its accessibility and abundance of fossils.

== Fortune Head Ecological Reserve ==
Fortune Head was established as a provisional reserve in 1990, and then given full ecological reserve status in 1992 following Fortune Head's selection as the global stratotype. The reserve is 2.21 km^{2} (0.85 sq mi) in size. The Fortune Head lighthouse, which is operated by the Canadian Coast Guard, is also on the reserve and functions as a visitor center.

== Geology ==
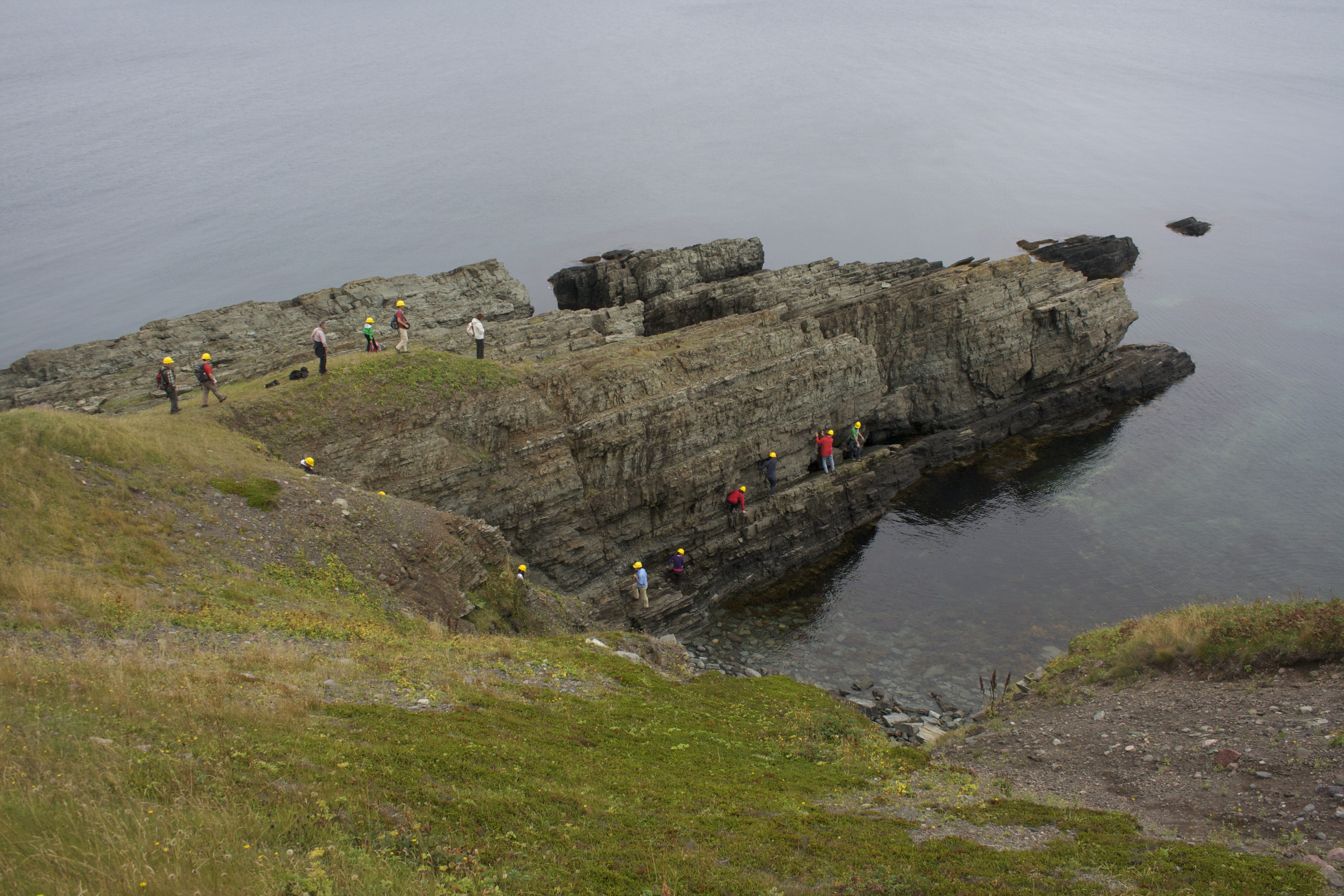
Delegates from the Ichnia 2012 conference inspect the Global Boundary Stratotype Section and Point (GSSP) for the Ediacaran-Cambrian boundary at Fortune Head Ecological Reserve, Newfoundland, Canada. The boundary is defined on the appearance of the complex, vertical trace fossil Treptichnus (formerly Phycodes) pedum.

The Burin Peninsula is part of the Avalon Zone of the Appalachian Orogen, the geology of which chronicles the late Precambrian Alleghenian Orogeny. The stratigraphy is not uniform throughout the region, however. The southern end of the peninsula includes a series of mafic pillow lavas, volcanogenic sediments, shales and limestones, collectively known as the Burin Group, as well as a 1500 m thick sill of gabbro about 760 million years old. The northern end of the peninsula is defined by the Marystown Group, primarily carbon-lacking Silica-based sediments which span the Precambrian-Cambrian boundary. The sediments were probably deposited in shoreline environments along the former Iapetus Ocean.

The global stratotype at Fortune Head is composed of the uppermost part of member 1 and all of member 2 of the Chapel Island Formation of the Marystown Group. The Chapel Island Formation consists primarily of sandstones, siltstones, and limestones. Some of these rocks exhibit mud cracks and stromatolites, suggesting that deposition occurred in tidal or, at deepest, continental shelf environments.

== Fossils ==
The boundary between the Precambrian and Cambrian is demarcated by the presence of trace fossils of Treptichnus pedum, one of the earliest animals. Without any hard anatomical features, Treptichnus is known only by its distinctive burrow pattern, which can be seen at Fortune Head.

Fortune Head records the beginning of a period of increasing biological diversity known as the "Cambrian explosion", and it exhibits a number of other Cambrian and Precambrian fossils, including early shell fossils, vendotaenid algae, soft-bodied megafossils, and microfossils. Below Treptichnus, the stratotype at Fortune Head includes traces of the arthropod Monomorphichnus, vertical dwelling burrows from Skolithos and Arenicolites, cnidarian resting burrows from Conichnus and Bergauria, and more intricate feeding burrows from Gyrolithes. More complex fossils appear later.
