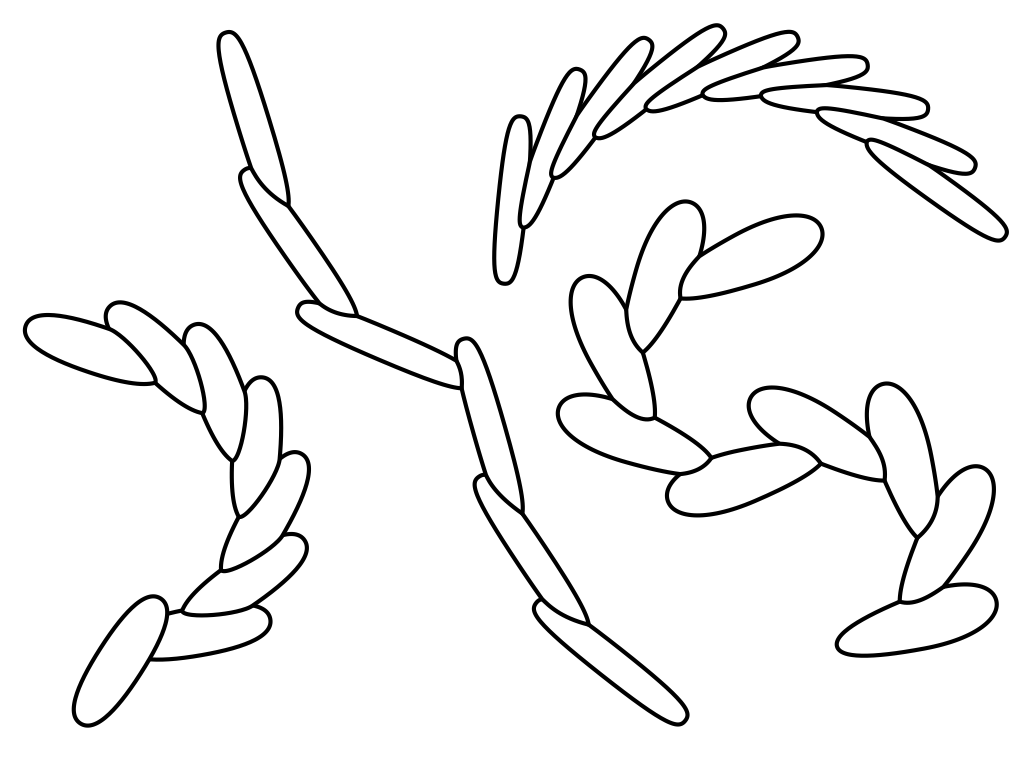
- Burrows viewed from the side
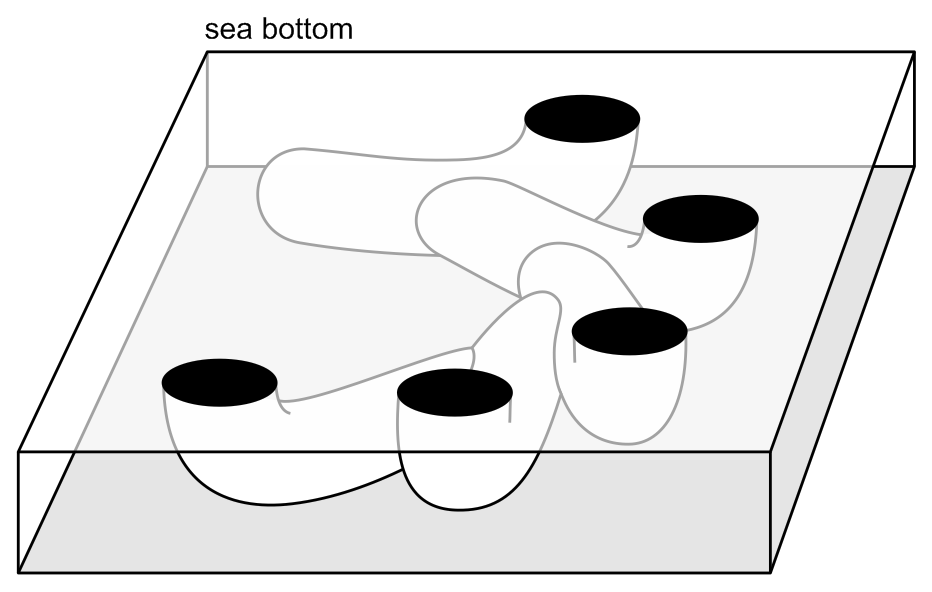
- Burrows viewed obliquely

Trace fossil classification
- Ichnogenus: Treptichnus; Miller, 1889

Type ichnospecies
- Treptichnus bifurcus Miller, 1889

Ichnospecies
- †T. apsorum Rindsberg & Kopasa-Merkel, 2005; †T. aequalternus Schlirf, 2000; †T. apsorum Rindsberg et Kopaska-Merkel, 2005; †T. arcus Wang et Wang, 2006; T. bifurcus Miller, 1889; †T. coronatum (Crimes et Anderson, 1985); †T. lublinensis Paczesna, 1986; †T. meandrinus Uchman, Bromley et Leszczyński, 1993; †T. pedum (Seilacher, 1955); †T. pollardi Buatois et Mángano, 1993; †T. rectangularis Orłowski et Żylińska, 1996; †T. streptosus Chen et Liu, 2025; †T. taijiangensis Wang et Wang, 2006; †T. triplex Palij, 1976; †T. vagans (Książkiewicz, 1977)

Synonyms
- Plangtichnus Miller, 1889; Manykodes Dzik, 2005; Affinovendia Sokolov, 1984

= Treptichnus =

Treptichnus Temporal range: 550–24 Ma

Preserved burrow of an animal

Treptichnus is a genus of trace fossils (with modern analogues) representing a three-dimensional burrow. These fossil traces are known from marine, brackish, and freshwater deposits from the Ediacaran (550 million years ago) to the Upper Oligocene (24 mya).

Treptichnus represents the oldest known example of a complex, three-dimensional burrow. One of its ichnospecies, Treptichnus pedum, is of major paleontological importance as it defines the global boundary between the Ediacaran and Cambrian periods (539 mya).

== Etymology ==
The name Treptichnus is derived from the Greek words trépō (τρέπω), meaning "to turn", and íchnos (ἴχνος), meaning "trace", forming the literal translation "turned trace", which describes the fossil's distinctive zigzag burrow pattern.

== Description ==
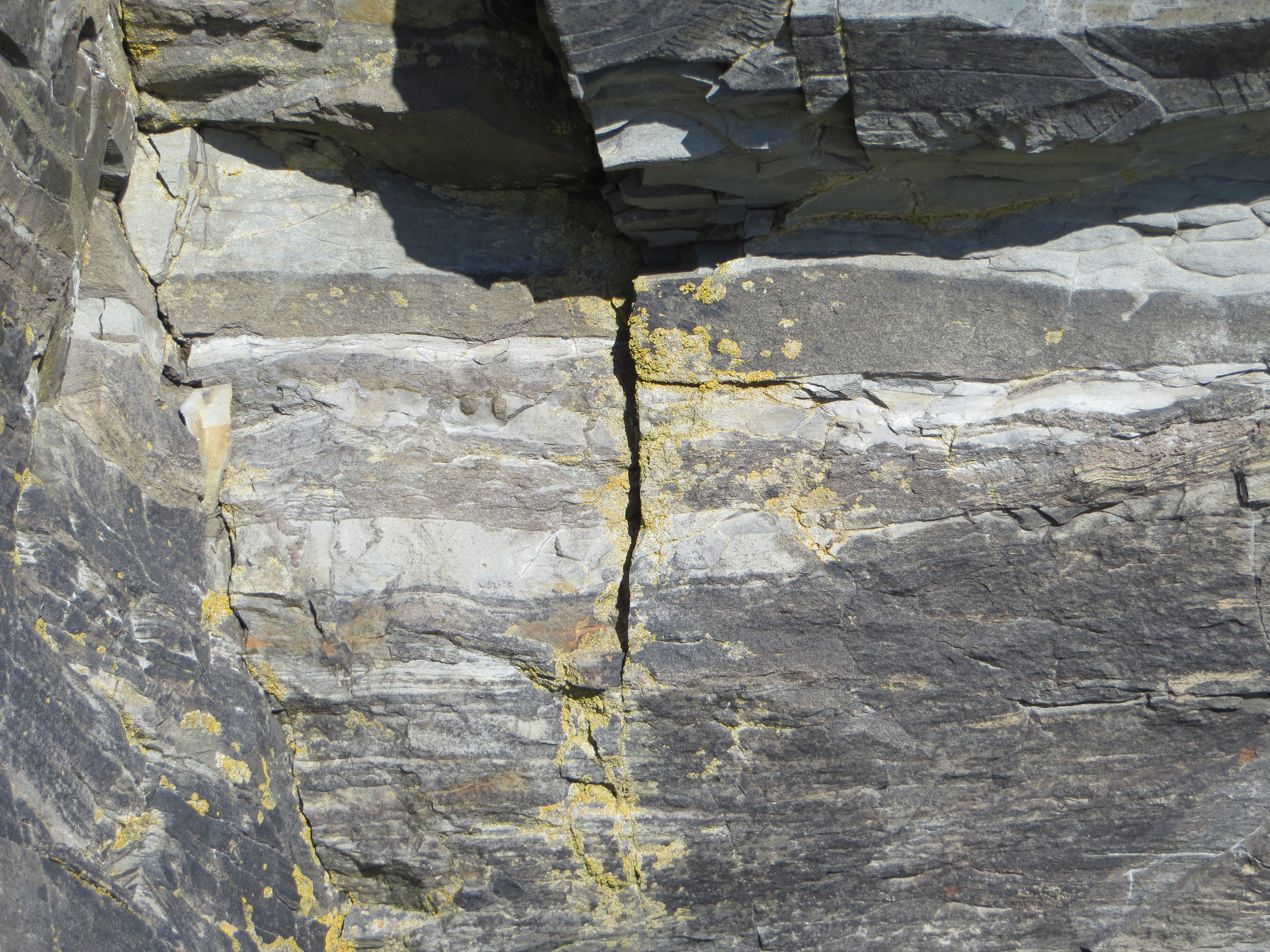
Treptichnus pedum fossil marking the Cambrian-Ediacaran GSSP

The as a shallow mole-tunnel-like burrow produced just below the sediment surface and consists of a series of horizontal tubular segments where one end connects to the previous segment, and the other is oriented upwards, providing an opening to the surface. The segments can be straight or curved, and arranged in a linear or zigzagging pattern.

It is hypothesised that the trace-makers systematically probed the sediment in search of nutrients, while the openings at the ends of the burrow segments could have served to collect food from the surrounding sediment surface or to ventilate the burrow.

No body fossils of the Treptichnus trace-makers have been found preserved within the burrows. It is believed that various organisms such as worms, crustaceans, and insect larvae could have produced these traces. Some late Ediacaran and Cambrian Treptichnus burrows are similar to traces made by modern priapulids, suggesting that this animal group may have originated as early as the Ediacaran Period.

Fossil traces from continental freshwater deposits, known from the Carboniferous to the Oligocene, most likely belonged to insect larvae, analogous to modern burrows produced by chironomids larvae.
