= List of English-language Canadian television series =

This is a list of English-language Canadian television series. For Canadian French-language shows, please see List of French-language Canadian television series.

To collate by year, see List of years in Canadian television.

== 0–9 ==
Title	Premiere	Ending	Genre	Network
1 Girl 5 Gays	2009	2014	Talk show	MTV Canada
1 Queen 5 Queers	2021		Talk show	Crave
1-800-Missing	2003	2005	Drama/action	A, W
10% QTV	1995	2001	News/information	Citytv
100 Huntley Street	1977		Talk/religious	Global, YES, Syndicated
15/Love	2004	2006	Teen drama	YTV
16x9	2008	2016	Investigative	Global
18 to Life	2010	2011	Comedy	CBC
19–2	2014	2017	Drama	Bravo, CTV
2001: A Space Road Odyssey	2001		Documentary/paranormal	Space
20/20	1962	1967	Documentary	CBC
24 Hour Rental	2014	2014	Comedy	Super Channel
49th & Main	2006	2006	Soap opera	CBC
6Teen	2004	2010	Teen/animated	Teletoon
72 Hours: True Crime	2004	2007	Drama/action	CBC
90 Minutes Live	1976	1978	Talk/variety	CBC
9B	1989	1989	Teen drama	CBC

== A ==
Title	Premiere	Ending	Genre	Network
Absolutely Canadian	2005		Documentary	CBC, CBC News Network
Across the River to Motor City	2007	2007	Dramatic miniseries	Citytv
Acting Good	2022		Sitcom	CTV Comedy Channel
Adderly	1986	1988	Drama/action	Global
Adrienne at Large	1974	1975	News/information	CBC
Adrienne Clarkson Presents	1988	1999	Music/variety	CBC
Adventure Inc.	2002	2003	Drama/action	Global
Adventures in Rainbow Country	1970	1971	Adventure drama	CBC
The Adventures of Napkin Man	2013	2017	Children's/animated	CBC
The Adventures of Paddington Bear	1997	2002	Children's/animated	Teletoon
The Adventures of Shirley Holmes	1997	2000	Children’s mystery	YTV
The Adventures of Sinbad	1996	1998	Children's/animated	Global
The Adventures of Timothy Pilgrim	1975	1975	Children's	TVOntario
The Adventures of Tintin	1991	1992	Children's/animated	Global
The Adventures of Tugboat Annie	1957	1958	Comedy/sitcom	Syndication
African Skies	1992	1994	Drama/action	The Family Channel
The Agenda	2006		Current affairs	TVOntario
Airwaves	1986	1987	Drama	CBC
Alan Hamel's Comedy Bag	1972	1973	Sketch comedy	CBC
Alias Grace	2017	2017	Dramatic miniseries	CBC
Alienated	2003	2004	Science fiction	Space
All Around the Circle	1964	1975	Music/variety	CBC
All for Nothing?	2010	2012	Reality	W
All-Round Champion	2020		Youth sports competition	TVOntario
Alphabet Soup	1971	1973	Children's	CBC
The Amazing Race Canada	2013		Reality	CTV
An American in Canada	2003	2004	Comedy/sitcom	CBC
Anaana's Tent	2018		Children's	APTN
Anash and the Legacy of the Sun-Rock	2007	2007	Children's	APTN
Andromeda	2000	2005	Science fiction	Global
Angela Anaconda	1999	2002	Children's/animated	Teletoon
Animal Crackers	1997	1999	Children's/animated	Teletoon
Animal Mechanicals	2007	2011	Children's/animated	CBC
Anne of Green Gables	1985	1985	Dramatic miniseries	CBC
Anne with an E	2017	2019	Drama	CBC
Any Woman Can	1974	1975	Lifestyle	CTV
Anyone's Game	2021	2021	Sports documentary	CBC
Anything You Can Do	1971	1974	game show	CTV
APTN Mainstage	1996		Music/variety	APTN
APTN National News			News	APTN
Arctic Air	2012	2014	Drama	CBC
Are You Afraid of the Dark?	1990	1996	Children's/thriller/horror	Family Channel, YTV
Are You Afraid of the Dark?	1999	2000	Children's/thriller/horror	Family Channel, YTV
Are You Afraid of the Dark?	2019	2022	Children's/thriller/horror	Family Channel, YTV
Are You Smarter Than a Canadian 5th Grader?	2007	2007	Game show	CBC
Arthur	1996	2022	Children's, animated	
Arts '73/'74/'75	1973	1975	Informational/arts and literature	CBC
The Associates	2001	2002	Drama/action	CTV
Atlantic Summer	1978	1979	Informational	CBC
Atomic Betty	2004	2008	Science fiction/children's/animated	Teletoon
The Atwood Stories	2003	2003	Dramatic anthology	W

== B ==
- Babar – children's/animated (1989–2002)
- Backyard Beats – children's/music (2020–present)
- Backyard Builds – home renovation (2017–present)
- Bad Blood – crime drama (2017-2019)
- Bad Dog – children's/animated (1998–2000)
- The Bachelor Canada – reality/drama (2012–present)
- Balance: Television for Living Well – talk/informational (2004–2008)
- Bandwagon with Bob Francis – music/variety (1972–1975)
- Barbara Frum – talk/informational (1974–1975)
- The Baroness Von Sketch Show – sketch comedy (2016–present)
- The Baxters – comedy (1979–1981)
- The Beachcombers – comedy/drama (1972–1990)
- Beast Machines: Transformers – children's/animated (1999–2000)
- Beast Wars: Transformers – children's/animated (1996–1999)
- Because I Said So – talk/comedy and variety
- Beetlejuice – children's/animated (1989–1991)
- Being Erica – comedy/drama (2009–2011)
- Being Human – supernatural/horror (2011–2014)
- Bellevue – crime drama (2017)
- Benmergui Live – news–oriented talk show
- Best Ed – children's/animated (2008–2009)
- The Best Laid Plans – comedy/drama (2014)
- Best Recipes Ever – cooking (2010–2014)
- The Best Years – teen/drama (2007–2009)
- Between – science fiction (2015–2016)
- Beyond Black Beauty – teen drama (2024-present)
- Beyond Reality – science fiction (1991–1993)
- Beyond Reason – game show (1977–1980)
- The Big Breakfast – news/morning
- Big Brother Canada – reality (2013–present)
- The Big Comfy Couch – children's (1992–2006)
- Big Wolf on Campus – horror/teen/drama (1999–2002)
- Billable Hours – comedy/sitcom (2006–2008)
- Birdz – animated (1998–1999)
- Birth Stories – documentary (2000–2004)
- Bits and Bytes – news/education (1983–1991)
- Bitten – drama/fantasy/horror (2014–2016)
- Bizarre – comedy/sketch (1980–1986)
- Black Community Mixtapes – documentary (2023)
- Black Life: Untold Stories – documentary (2023)
- Black Harbour – drama/action (1996–1999)
- Blackfly – comedy/sitcom (2001–2002)
- Blackstone – political/crime drama (2011–2015)
- Bliss – drama/action (2002–2004)
- BLK, An Origin Story – documentary (2022)
- Blood Ties – drama (2007)
- Bloodletting & Miraculous Cures – medical drama (2010)
- Blue Murder – crime drama/action (2001–2004)
- Bob & Doug – comedy/animated (2009–2011)
- Bob and Margaret – comedy/animated (1998–2001)
- The Bobroom – sketch comedy (2004)
- Bomb Girls – period drama (2012–2013)
- The Book of Negroes (2015)
- The Border – drama/action (2008–2010)
- The Borderline – crime drama (2026)
- Braceface – children's/animated (2001–2004)
- Brave New Girls – reality (2014–present)
- Breaker High – teen comedy/drama (1997–1998)
- Breakfast Television – news/morning
- The Bridge – police drama (2010)
- British Columbia: An Untold History – documentary
- Builder Brothers Dream Factory – animated/children's (2023)
- Bumper Stumpers – game show (1987–1990)
- Burden of Truth – legal drama (2018–2021)
- Busytown Mysteries – children's/animated (2007–2010)
- Butch Patterson: Private Dick – comedy (1999–2001)
- Buy Herself – reality/real estate (2012–2013)
- Buzz – comedy (2000–2005)

== C ==
- Caillou – children's/animated
- Call Me Mother – reality/competition
- Cam Boy – drama
- Camp Cariboo – children's
- Campaign Politics – news/talk
- The Campbells – drama
- Canada 98 – documentary
- Canada After Dark – talk/comedy/variety
- Canada AM – news/morning
- Canada in View – documentary
- Canada: A People's History – documentary
- Canada: The Story of Us – documentary
- Canada's Drag Race – reality
- Canada's Got Talent – reality
- Canada's Next Top Model – reality
- Canada's Worst Driver – reality
- Canadian Antiques Roadshow – lifestyle
- The Canadian Establishment – documentary
- The Canadian Experience – documentary
- Canadian Express – music/variety
- Canadian Idol – reality
- Cannonball – adventure/drama
- The Care Bears Family – children's/animated (1986–1988)
- Cardinal – crime drama (2017-2020)
- Carnival Eats – food
- Carter – crime drama (2018-2020)
- A Case for the Court – reality
- Cash Cab – game show
- Cashing In – comedy-drama
- Catch Up – children's
- Catwalk – drama
- Caught – crime drama
- Caution: May Contain Nuts – sketch comedy
- Cavendish – comedy
- CBC News – news
- CBC News Magazine – newsmagazine
- CBC News: Morning – news
- CBC News: Sunday – news
- CBC News: Today – news
- CBC Selects – anthology
- Celebrity Cooks – lifestyle/cooking
- CFL on CBC – sports
- CFL on TSN – sports
- Charlie Had One But He Didn't Like It, So He Gave It To Us – sketch comedy (1966)
- Charlie Jade – drama/mystery/science fiction (2005)
- Chasing Rainbows – drama
- Check It Out! – comedy/sitcom
- Chef at Home – lifestyle/cooking
- Chef in Your Ear – cooking/reality
- Chez Hélène – children's (bilingual, aired on CBC's English network)
- Children Ruin Everything – comedy (2022)
- Chilly Beach – comedy/animated (2003–2008)
- Chopped Canada – cooking/competition (2014–2017)
- Chris & John's Road Trip! – comedy/reality
- Christine Cushing Live – lifestyle/cooking
- Circle Square – religious/children's
- Circus – circus/variety
- Cities – documentary
- The City – drama/action (1999)
- Class of the Titans – action/children's/animated
- Clone High – comedy/animated
- Close-Up – interview
- Closer – music
- Cocaine, Prison & Likes: Isabelle's True Story – documentary (2022)
- CODCO – comedy/sketch
- Cold Squad – police procedural/drama
- The Collaborators – drama/action
- Combat Hospital – medical/drama/military/war
- Comedy at Club 54 – comedy/stand-up
- Comedy Inc. – comedy/sketch
- Comedy Invasion – comedy/stand-up
- Comedy Network Presents – comedy/stand-up
- Comedy Now! – comedy/stand-up
- Comics! – comedy/stand-up
- Coming Up Rosie – comedy/sitcom
- Committed – comedy/animated
- Commonwealth Jazz Club – music, with ABC and BBC
- Commonwealth Televiews – news
- Connect with Mark Kelley – news
- Connor Undercover – teen action-comedy
- Continuum – science fiction (2012–2015)
- Conviction Kitchen – reality/documentary
- Cooking with the Wolfman – lifestyle/cooking
- Corner Gas – comedy/sitcom (2004-2009)
- Corner Gas Animated – animated/comedy (2018–2021)
- Country Canada – documentary
- Countrytime – music/variety
- Cracked – drama (2013)
- Cra$h & Burn – drama (2009)
- Crash Gallery – reality
- Crawford – comedy
- Cross Canada Barndance – music/variety
- The Crow: Stairway to Heaven – action/crime/drama/thriller (1998–1999)
- Cucumber – children's
- A Cut Above – reality/competition
- Cyberchase – children's/animated
- Cybersix – sci-fi/drama/cartoon

== D ==
- The D Cut – comedy/drama
- Da Kink in My Hair – comedy/drama
- Da Vinci's City Hall – drama
- Da Vinci's Inquest – drama/action
- Daily Planet, previously known as @discovery.ca – science/technology
- Dan for Mayor – comedy
- Danger Bay – drama/action
- Dark Matter – science fiction
- The David Steinberg Show – comedy
- Deal or No Deal Canada – game show
- Dear Aunt Agnes – children's
- Death Comes to Town – comedy
- Debbie Travis' Facelift – lifestyle
- Decked Out – home renovation
- The Decorating Adventures of Ambrose Price – lifestyle
- Defi mini-putt – sports
- Definition – game show
- Degrassi High – children's (1989–1991)
- Degrassi Junior High – children's (1987–1989)
- Degrassi: Next Class – children's (2016–2017)
- Degrassi: The Next Generation (later shortened to Degrassi for seasons 10–14) – children's (2001–2015)
- Delilah – sitcom
- Delta State – science fiction/animated
- Denny's Sho – music/variety
- Design Interns – reality competition (2006)
- Design Rivals – lifestyle
- Designer Guys – lifestyle
- The Dessert - sketch comedy
- Destiny Ridge – drama
- The Detail – crime drama
- The Detectives – true crime docudrama
- Dex Hamilton: Alien Entomologist – animated
- Di-Gata Defenders – science fiction/children's/animated
- Diamonds – action/comedy
- Diggstown – legal drama
- The Dini Petty Show – talk/variety
- Disclosure – news/information
- Disrepair - miniseries
- The Dish Show – comedy
- D'Myna Leagues – children's/animated
- Dr. Zonk and the Zunkins – children's
- Dog House – children's
- Dollars and Sense – informational/business
- Don Messer's Jubilee – music/variety
- Donkey Kong Country - children's/animated
- Don't Even – sitcom
- Dooley Gardens – sitcom
- Dr. Savannah: Wild Rose Vet - documentary
- Dragon Tales
- Dragons' Den – reality/business
- The Drop – comedy (2023)
- Dress Rehearsal – children's
- Drop the Beat – drama/action
- Drop-In – children's
- The Drunk and On Drugs Happy Fun Time Hour – comedy
- Due South – drama/action (1994–1999)
- Durham County – crime drama (2007-2010)

== E ==
- E.N.G. – drama/action
- Ear to the Ground – music/documentary
- Earth: Final Conflict – science fiction (1997–2002)
- Ed, Edd n Eddy – children's/animated (1999-2009)
- Ed's Night Party – comedy/talk
- Edgemont – drama/action
- The Edison Twins – drama/action
- Ekhaya: A Family Chronicle – dramatic miniseries
- Electric Circus – music/dance
- The Eleventh Hour – drama/action
- Elwood Glover's Luncheon Date – talk/interview
- Emily of New Moon – drama/family
- Empire, Inc. – drama miniseries
- Employable Me – documentary
- Encounter – news/information
- Endgame – drama/mystery/crime
- Enslaved – documentary
- Eric's World – children's
- eTalk Daily – news/entertainment
- Everyone's Famous – comedy
- Excuse My French – sitcom

== F ==
- The Fabulous Show with Fay and Fluffy – children's
- The Fabulous Sixties – documentary
- The Face of Furry Creek – comedy
- Fairy Tale – reality/dating
- Fakes – comedy
- Falcon Beach – drama (2004-2006)
- La Famille Plouffe – drama
- Family Law – drama (2021–present)
- The Family Restaurant – documentary/reality
- Famous Jury Trials – drama
- FANatical – reality (2006–2007)
- #FAQMP – interview
- The Fifth Estate – news/information
- Finding Stuff Out – children's/science
- First Contact – documentary
- First Person Singular: Pearson – The Memoirs of a Prime Minister – documentary
- First Wave – science fiction
- Flash Forward – teen sitcom
- Flashpoint – police drama (2008-2013)
- Fool Canada – comedy
- Foolish Heart – dramatic anthology
- For Better or For Worse – comedy/animated
- For Heaven's Sake – documentary
- For the Record – dramatic anthology
- Forbidden Places – science documentary
- Foreign Objects – dramatic anthology
- The Forest Rangers – drama/action
- Forever Knight – drama/action
- Forgive Me – drama
- Fortunate Son – drama
- The Foundation – comedy
- Four Directions – drama anthology
- Four in the Morning – comedy-drama
- Four on the Floor – comedy/sketch
- Fraggle Rock – children's (1983–1987)
- Franklin – children's/animated
- Franklin and Friends – children's/CGI animated
- Fred Penner's Place – children's
- Friday the 13th: The Series – horror/supernatural
- Friday Night Football – sports
- Friday Night with Ralph Benmergui – talk/comedy and variety
- Fridge Wars – cooking competition (2020–present)
- The Friendly Giant – children's
- Fries with That? – teens/sitcom
- From the Ground Up with Debbie Travis – reality
- From Spain with Love with Annie Sibonney – reality
- From the Vaults – music performance
- Front Page Challenge – game show
- Funny as Hell – stand-up comedy
- Funny Farm – comedy/music
- Future History – documentary
- F/X: The Series – action/crime/drama (1996–1998)

== G ==
- G-Spot – comedy
- Gallery – documentary
- The Galloping Gourmet – lifestyle/cooking
- Game On – teen sitcom
- Gaming Show (In My Parents' Garage) – children's
- The Gavin Crawford Show – comedy/sketch
- Gay News and Views – LGBT community newsmagazine
- George – family
- George Shrinks – children's/animated/family
- Gespe'gewa'gi: The Last Land – documentary
- A Gift to Last – drama/action (1976–1979)
- Gisèle's Big Backyard – children's (2005–2016)
- Giver – children's/reality
- Global Currents – news/documentary
- Global National – news
- Global Playhouse – drama anthology (1984–1986)
- Global Sunday – news/information (2001–2005)
- God's Greatest Hits – music/documentary
- Godiva's – comedy/drama (2005–2006)
- Going Great – children's
- Gold Trails and Ghost Towns – historical documentary/talk show
- Good Dog – comedy/drama
- Good God – comedy/drama
- Good Morning Canada – news/morning
- Good People – documentary
- Good Rockin' Tonite – music/variety
- The Goods – talk show
- Goosebumps – children's horror anthology
- The Great Canadian Baking Show – cooking/competition (2017–present)
- The Great Canadian Holiday Baking Show cooking/competition (2019)
- The Great Debate – talk show/debate
- The Great Detective – drama/action
- Group Sext – reality/dating (2020–present)
- The Guard – drama
- Guilt Free Zone – variety/sketch comedy
- Gut Job – reality/home renovation
- Gutterball Alley – game show/comedy

== H ==
- Hammy Hamster – children's
- Hangin' In – comedy/sitcom
- Happy House of Frightenstein – children's cartoon
- Happy Tree Friends – black comedy
- Hard Rock Medical – medical drama
- Harriet's Magic Hats – children's
- Harrigan – children's
- Hatching, Matching and Dispatching – comedy
- Haven – supernatural/drama
- He Shoots, He Scores – drama/action
- Headline Hunters – game show
- Heartland – drama
- Heated Rivalry – sports/romance
- Here Come the Seventies – documentary
- Heritage Minutes – 60-second PSAs aired on all networks
- Hey Halifax, Hello! Today! – sketch comedy
- Hiccups – comedy
- Highlander: The Raven – science fiction
- Highlander: The Series – science fiction
- The Hilarious House of Frightenstein – children's sketch comedy
- Hinterland Who's Who – 30-second PSAs aired on all networks
- Hip-Hop Evolution – music/documentary
- History Bites – comedy/satire/information
- History Erased – documentary
- Hi-Tech: Adrenalyze (TV series) – action/science fiction
- Hockey Night in Canada – sports
- Holly Hobbie – teen drama
- Holmes Family Effect – renovation
- Holmes Inspection – home improvement
- Holmes on Homes – home improvement
- The Holmes Show – comedy/sketch
- Home Fires – drama/action
- Home to Win – home improvement/competition
- Homemade TV – comedy/sketch
- Hot Type – talk/informational
- House of Venus Show – comedy/sketch
- How I Got Here – documentary
- How It's Made – documentary
- How to Be Indie – children's comedy
- How to Fail as a Popstar – comedy (2023)
- Howie Mandel's Sunny Skies – sketch comedy
- Howie Meeker's Hockey School – sports
- Huckleberry Finn and His Friends – adventure
- Human Edge – news/information
- Humour Resources – comedy
- Hymn Sing – music/religious

== I ==
- I Do, Redo – reality
- I Hate Hollywood – comedy
- I Hate People, People Hate Me – comedy (2023)
- The Illegal Eater – food/reality
- Images of Canada – documentary
- Imprint – news/information
- Improv Heaven and Hell – comedy/improvisation
- In a Heartbeat – teen drama
- In the Kitchen with Stefano Faita – cooking (2011–2014)
- In the Making – documentary
- In the Mood – music/variety
- In Opposition – sitcom
- The Indian Detective – comedy-drama
- Indigenous Art Adventures – children's/educational
- InSecurity – comedy/sitcom
- Inside Entertainment – news/entertainment
- Instant Star – drama/teen
- Intelligence – drama
- Interrupt This Program – documentary
- The Irish Rovers – music/variety
- It's Happening – music (1960s)
- It's a Living – documentary
- It's Only Rock & Roll – comedy

== J ==
- Jacob Two-Two – children's/animated
- Jake and the Kid (1961) – drama
- Jake and the Kid (1995) – drama
- Jann – comedy
- The John Allan Cameron Show (CBC) – music/variety
- Johnny Test – children's/animated
- Jojo's Circus – children's/animated
- Jonovision – youth/talk show (1996–2001)
- The Journal – news/information
- Jozi-H – drama
- jPod – drama/comedy
- JR Digs – comedy
- Junior Chef Showdown – cooking competition
- Junior Television Club – children's/news
- Junk Brothers – reality
- Junk Raiders – reality
- Just for Laughs – comedy/stand-up
- Just for Laughs Gags – comedy/pranks
- Just Like Mom – children's game show

== K ==
- Kate & Mim-Mim – children's animated (2014–18)
- Katts and Dog – action (police K-9)
- Keeping Canada Alive – documentary
- Kenny vs. Spenny – comedy
- Kevin Spencer – comedy/animated
- Kids' CBC – children's
- The Kids in the Hall – comedy/sketch (1998–95)
- Kids of Degrassi Street – children's/drama (1979–1986)
- Kidstreet – game show
- Kidstuff – children's
- Killjoys – science fiction series (2014–2019)
- Kim's Convenience – sitcom
- King – police procedural
- King of Kensington – comedy/sitcom
- Kitchen Equipped – lifestyle
- Klahanie – lifestyle/travel
- Knock Knock Ghost – paranormal reality/comedy
- Kung Fu: The Legend Continues – action/crime/drama/fantasy (1993–1997)

== L ==
- Lance et Compte – drama
- Land and Sea – documentary
- Landscape Artist of the Year Canada – reality competition
- The Lang and O'Leary Exchange – business news
- The Latest Buzz – teen sitcom
- The Launch – music competition
- Law & Order Toronto: Criminal Intent - police drama
- Learning the Ropes – teen comedy/drama
- Leave It to Bryan – reality/home renovation
- Less Than Kind – comedy/drama
- Less Than Kosher – comedy (2023)
- Let's Go – music (CBC, 1964–1968)
- Let's Go – children's (CTV, 1976–1984)
- Letterkenny (a/k/a Letterkenny Problems) – comedy
- Lexx – science fiction
- Liberty Street – drama
- Life and Times – documentary
- Life with Derek – youth/sitcom
- The Life-Sized City – documentary
- The Line – police drama
- The Listener – supernatural drama
- Little Bear – children's/animated
- Little Big Community – documentary (2023-present)
- Little Bird – drama
- Little Dog – comedy-drama
- Little Men – drama
- Little Mosque on the Prairie – sitcom
- The Little Vampire – children's/adventure (1986–1987)
- The Littlest Hobo – drama/action
- Live It Up! – information/consumer affairs
- Living – lifestyle/variety
- Living Clean – interactive talk show
- Living in Your Car – comedy/drama
- Loft Story – reality
- Lord Have Mercy! – comedy/sitcom
- Lorne Greene's New Wilderness – nature
- Lost Car Rescue – documentary
- Lost Girl – supernatural/drama
- Love Handles – game show
- Love It or List It – lifestyle
- Love It or List It Vancouver – lifestyle
- Loving Friends and Perfect Couples – soap opera (1983)

== M ==
- The Mad Dash – game show
- Made in Canada – comedy/sitcom
- Madison – youth/drama
- The Magic Lie – children's
- Magic Shadows – educational
- Make the Politician Work – documentary (2009–2011)
- Making the Cut: Last Man Standing – sports/reality
- Man Alive – religion/spiritual
- Maniac Mansion – science fiction/comedy (1990–93)
- Mansbridge: One on One – news/information
- Mantracker – reality/sport
- The Marilyn Denis Show – talk show
- Marketplace – informational/consumer affairs
- Married Life – comedy-drama
- Martin Mystery - children's/sci-fi
- Mary Makes It Easy – cooking
- Mary Walsh: Open Book – informational/arts and literature
- Mary's Kitchen Crush – cooking
- Masters of Flip – reality/home renovation
- Material World – comedy/sitcom
- Math Patrol – children's/educational
- Matt and Jenny – children's/drama
- Max, the 2000-Year-Old Mouse – children's/educational
- Max Glick – comedy/sitcom
- Me & Max – comedy/sitcom
- Media Stamped – children's/educational
- The Medicine Show – documentary
- Medicine Woman – documentary
- Men with Brooms – sitcom
- Mentors – children's
- Metropia – soap opera
- Michael Coren Live – talk/current events show
- Michael, Tuesdays and Thursdays – sitcom
- Midday – news/information
- The Mike Bullard Show – talk/comedy and variety
- Minnow on the Say – children's/drama
- Miss Persona – children's (2018–present)
- Mr. Chips – lifestyle
- Mr. Dressup – children's (1967–1996)
- Mr. Wizard – children's
- Mittens & Pants – children's
- Mixed Blessings – comedy/drama
- Moccasin Flats – drama/action (2003–2006)
- Mona the Vampire – children's/animated (1999–2003)
- Moneymakers – informational/business
- Monster by Mistake – children's/animated (1996–2003)
- Moonshine – drama
- Moose TV – sitcom
- More Tears – dramatic anthology
- Mosquito Lake – comedy/sitcom
- Motel Makeover – reality
- Motive – police procedural/crime drama (2013-2016)
- MovieTelevision – entertainment news
- Moving On – documentary
- MTV Select – music
- MumbleBumble – children's/animated (1998–2000)
- Murdoch Mysteries – historical crime drama (2008–present)
- Music to See – music (1957)
- Music to See – music (1970–1979)
- Music Works – music
- Mutant X – science fiction/drama (2001–2004)
- My Dad the Rock Star – children's/animated (2003–2004)
- My Fabulous Gay Wedding – reality (2005)
- My Goldfish Is Evil! – children's/animated
- My Little Pony: Friendship is Magic – children's/animated (2010-2019)
- My Rona Home – reality/competition
- My Secret Identity – drama/youth (1988–1991)
- MythQuest - children's/action

== N ==
- Naked Josh – comedy (2004–2006)
- Nanalan – children's (2000–2006)
- The National – news/information
- The National Dream – documentary
- The Nation's Business – political
- Naturally, Sadie – youth/sitcom (2005–2007)
- The Nature of Things – informational/science
- Ned's Newt – children's/animated (1997–1999)
- Network – variety (1962–1963)
- The New Reality – newsmagazine (2020s–present)
- The NewMusic – music (1979–2008)
- The Newsroom – comedy/drama (1996–2005)
- The Next Step – teen drama (2013–2025)
- Night Heat – drama/action (1985–1989)
- Night Hood – children's/animated (1996–1997)
- Night Walk – music/slow television (1986–1993)
- Nikita – drama/action (1997–2001)
- Nilus the Sandman – children's/animated (1996–1998)
- Nirvanna the Band the Show – comedy (2017–2018)
- North of 60 – drama/action (1992–1997)
- North/South – soap opera (2006)
- Northwood – drama/action (1991–1994)
- Not My Department – sitcom (1987)
- Nothing Too Good for a Cowboy – comedy/drama (1998–2000)
- Nurses – medical drama (2020-2021)

== O ==
- O Canada – comedy/animated/anthology
- Odd Job Jack – comedy/animated
- Odd Squad – children's/comedy (2014–2022)
- The Odyssey – teen drama / fantasy (1992–1994)
- Odyssey 5 – science fiction
- Off the Record with Michael Landsberg – talk/sports
- The Office Movers (2024-present) – sitcom
- Ombudsman – news/information
- On the Evidence – drama/action
- On the Road Again – documentary
- Once a Thief – crime
- Once Upon a Hamster – children's
- One More Time (1969-70) – music
- One More Time (2024) – sitcom
- One Night Stand with Annie Sibonney – reality
- Open Mike with Mike Bullard – talk/comedy and variety
- Opening Night – drama/action
- An Optimist's Guide to the Planet – documentary
- Orphan Black – science fiction
- Our Hero
- The Outer Limits – science fiction
- Over the Rainbow – reality/talent competition

== P ==
- Paid in Full: The Battle for Black Music – documentary
- Pamela Wallin Live – news/talk show
- Paradise Falls – soap opera
- Parlez-moi – children's
- Party Game – game show
- The Passionate Eye – news/information
- Paw Patrol – children's/animated
- Peacemakers – western/crime/drama (2003)
- Pecola – children's/animated
- The Phoenix Team – drama
- Picnicface – sketch comedy
- The Pig and Whistle – music/variety
- Pillow Talk – comedy
- Pilot One – music/variety
- Pink Is In – comedy (2021–present)
- Pit Pony – drama
- Play – music
- Played – police procedural (2013)
- Political Blind Date – public affairs
- Polka Dot Door – children's
- Polka Dot Shorts – children's
- Popstars – reality
- Popular Mechanics For Kids – children's (1997–2001)
- Popularity Papers — children's/comedy
- The Porter – drama (2021–present)
- Porthole TV – travel
- Power & Politics – news
- Power Play – drama/action (1998–2000)
- Power Play – political affairs (2009–present)
- Prank Patrol – comedy/reality (2005–2010)
- Pretty Hard Cases – police drama (2021–present)
- Pride – documentary
- Primeval: New World – science fiction
- Producing Parker – comedy/animated
- Project Runway Canada – reality/competition
- Property Virgins – lifestyle
- Psi Factor: Chronicles of the Paranormal – science fiction
- Puppets Who Kill – comedy/sitcom
- Pure – drama (2017-2018)
- Pure Pwnage – comedy/mockumentary
- Puttnam's Prairie Emporium – children's

== Q ==
- QT: QueerTelevision – news/information (1998–2000)
- Queer as Folk – drama (2000–2005)
- Quentin Durgens, M.P. – drama (1965–1969)
- Question Period – news/politics (1967–present)

== R ==
- Rabbit Fall – drama
- The Raccoons – animated/family/comedy-drama
- Race Against the Tide – reality/competition
- Radio Active – teen/sitcom
- Radio Free Roscoe – children's
- Radisson – adventure
- Raising Expectations – family comedy
- The Rare Breed – news/information
- The Ray Bradbury Theater (1985–1992)
- Razzle Dazzle – children's
- Reach for the Top – game show
- Read All About It! – education/fantasy
- Ready or Not – youth/drama
- ReBoot – children's/animated (1994–2001)
- Recipe to Riches – reality/competition
- Recreating Eden – lifestyle/gardening
- The Red Fisher Show – outdoors
- The Red Green Show – comedy (1991–2006)
- Red Serge – Western comedy-drama
- Redwall – children's/animated
- ReGenesis – drama
- Remedy – medical drama
- Rent-a-Goalie – sitcom
- Republic of Doyle – comedy/drama
- Restaurant Makeover – reality/makeover/home decor
- The Rez – Aboriginal drama
- Rez Bluez – music
- Rick Mercer Report – news/comedy/satire
- Rideau Hall – comedy/sitcom
- Rise – documentary
- Riverdale – soap opera
- Road to Avonlea – drama/action (1990–96)
- Road Movies – documentary (1992-1993)
- RoboCop: Prime Directives – science fiction/drama
- RoboCop: The Series – science fiction/action (1994)
- Robson Arms – dramatic anthology
- Rock Camp – documentary
- Rock Solid Builds – design/renovation (2021–present)
- Rock Wars – music competition
- Rocket Monkeys – children's/animated (2013-2016)
- Rocket Robin Hood – animated
- Rockpoint P.D. – comedy
- Rogue – drama (2013–present)
- Rolie Polie Olie – children's/animated
- Roll Play – children's/exercise (2006–2013)
- The Ron James Show – comedy
- Rookie Blue – police drama
- Rough Cuts – documentary
- Royal Canadian Air Farce – comedy/sketch
- Ruby Gloom – children's/animated (2006–2008)
- Rumours – drama/comedy
- Rupert – children's/animated
- Ruzicka – music/variety

== S ==
- The Saddle Club – children's
- Sanctuary – science fiction/drama/paranormal
- Sarah's House – reality/home renovation
- Saturday Night at the Movies – documentary
- Sausage Factory – comedy/sitcom
- Save Me – medical comedy-drama
- The Save-Ums! – children's/animated
- Save Us from Our House – reality/home renovation
- Saving Hope – supernatural/medical drama
- Saying Goodbye – drama anthology
- Scales of Justice – legal docudrama anthology
- Schitt's Creek – comedy
- Science International – informational/science
- Science Magazine – informational/science
- SCTV – comedy/sketch
- Scully: The World Show – talk/informational
- Seaway – adventure/drama
- Second Jen – sitcom
- Secret History – documentary
- Seed – comedy
- Seeing Things – mystery comedy-drama
- The Sentinel – science fiction/drama
- Sesame Park – children's
- Settle Down - comedy
- Sew Fierce – reality competition
- Sex & Violence – drama
- Shadow Raiders – children's/animated
- Sharon, Lois and Bram's Elephant Show – children's
- Shattered – crime drama
- The Shields Stories – dramatic anthology
- Shoot the Messenger – crime drama
- The Shopping Bags – information/reality
- Shoresy – comedy
- Showdown – game show
- Side Effects – Drama
- Sidekick – Children's/animated
- Sidestreet – drama/action
- Silverwing – Children's/animated
- SketchCom – comedy/sketch
- Skinnamarink TV – children's/comedy
- Slim Pig – children's/animated
- Slings and Arrows – comedy/drama
- SmartAsk – game show
- Smith & Smith – comedy/sketch
- Snakes and Ladders – comedy/sitcom
- Snow Job – comedy/sitcom
- So Gay TV – talk/information
- So You Think You Can Dance Canada – reality
- The Social – talk show
- Some Assembly Required – teen comedy
- Songs of Freedom – documentary/music
- Sophie – comedy/sitcom
- Soul – miniseries
- South Asian Veggie Table – South Asian and Indian vegetarian cooking show
- Space Cases – children's/science fiction/comedy
- Speakers' Corner – talk/public access
- Spirit Bay – drama/action
- Splatalot – reality/comedy
- Spliced – children/animated
- Sports on Fire – sports documentary
- Spun Out – comedy
- Spynet – children's
- Stargate Atlantis – science fiction
- Stargate SG-1 – science fiction
- Stargate Universe – science fiction
- Starhunter – science fiction
- The Starlost – science fiction
- The Stationary Ark – documentary
- Steven and Chris – talk (2008–2015)
- Still Standing – comedy/reality
- Stoked – Animated
- Strange Days at Blake Holsey High – children
- Strange Empire – Western drama
- Strange Paradise – suspense
- Streams Flow from a River – drama (2023)
- Street Cents – informational/consumer affairs
- Street Legal – drama/action
- Striking Balance – documentary
- The Struggle for Democracy – documentary
- Student Bodies – comedy/sitcom
- Studio 2 – news/information
- Stuff the British Stole – documentary (2023)
- Sue Thomas: F.B. Eye – crime drama
- Sugar – cooking
- Sullivan's Crossing - drama
- Summer Memories - children's/animated
- Sunday Edition – news/politics
- Sunday Report – news/information
- Sunnyside – sketch comedy
- Sunshine City - comedy/mystery
- Sunshine Sketches – comedy/drama
- Super Dave Osborne – comedy
- Super Why! – children's/animated
- Supermodels – reality
- Supertown Challenge – game show/comedy/satire
- SurrealEstate – science fiction
- Survivorman – documentary/adventure
- Swiss Family Robinson – family
- The Switch – comedy
- Switchback – children's

== T ==
- Tabloid – public affairs
- Take 30 – news show
- Take a Chance – quiz show
- Tales of the Riverbank – children's
- TallBoyz – sketch comedy
- Target: The Impossible – documentary
- Telepoll – talk
- Telling Our Story – documentary (2023)
- Terminal City – drama
- Test Pattern – game show
- Testees – comedy/sitcom
- That's So Weird! – comedy/variety
- Theodore Tugboat – children's
- These Arms of Mine – drama
- Thicke of the Night – talk show
- This Hour Has 22 Minutes – news/comedy/satire (1993–)
- This Hour Has Seven Days – news/information
- This is Daniel Cook – children's
- This is Emily Yeung – children's
- This Is the Law – news/information
- This Is Pop – music documentary (2021)
- This Is Wonderland – drama/action
- This Land – news/information
- This Sitcom Is...Not to Be Repeated – comedy/improvisation
- This Week in Parliament – news/politics
- Three Chords from the Truth – comedy
- Thrill of a Lifetime – reality
- TimeChase – quiz show
- Timothy Goes to School – children's/animated
- Tiny Plastic Men – comedy
- Tiny Talent Time – children's/talent show
- Titans – talk/informational
- To See Ourselves – drama/action
- To Serve and Protect – documentary
- To the Wild Country – documentary
- Today's Special – children's
- Todd and the Book of Pure Evil – Comedy/Action
- The Tom Green Show – comedy (later American) (1994–2000)
- Tom Stone – crime/drama
- The Tommy Banks Show – music/variety
- Top Million Dollar Agent – lifestyle (2015–present)
- Total Drama – animated
- Total Recall 2070 – science fiction (1999)
- Totally Spies - children's/action
- The Tournament – comedy (2005–2006)
- Traders – drama/action
- Trailer Park Boys – comedy/sitcom
- Train 48 – soap opera
- Transplant – medical drama
- Travelers – science fiction
- Treaty Road – documentary (2024)
- Tribal – crime drama (2020–present)
- Trickster – drama
- Tropical Heat – action/comedy
- The Trouble with Tracy – comedy/sitcom
- True and the Rainbow Kingdom – children's
- Turning Points of History – documentary
- Twenty Questions – game show
- Twice in a Lifetime – drama
- Twitch City – comedy/sitcom
- Two – drama

== U ==
- U8TV: The Lofters – reality (2001–2002)
- Uncle Bobby – children's (1964–1979)
- The Undaunted – docudrama (1983)
- Under New Management – reality
- Under the Umbrella Tree – children's (1986–1993)
- Undercover High – prank comedy (2014–2016)
- Undercurrents – news/information (1995–2001)
- Undergrads – comedy/animated (2001)
- Undisrupted – music (2021)
- Unsettled – drama
- Untamed World – nature
- Unusually Thicke – reality/mockumentary
- Up at Ours – comedy/sitcom (1979–1982)
- Urban Angel – crime/drama (1991–1993)
- The Urban Peasant – cooking
- Urban Suburban – reality (2011–present)
- Uh Oh! (game show) – game show

== V ==
- V.I.P. – talk/informational (1973–1983)
- Venture – informational/business (1985–2007)
- Video Hits – music/variety (1984–1993)
- The View from Here – documentary
- Vikings – historical drama (2013–present)
- Vollies – comedy (2021–present)

== W ==
- W5 – news/information (1966–present)
- Wall of Chefs – cooking competition (2020–present)
- War Story – documentary (2012–present)
- Warrior Up! – documentary/youth (2024-present)
- The Water Brothers – documentary (2012–present)
- Watership Down – children's/animated (1999–2001)
- Waterville Gang – children's (1972–1974)
- The Watson Report – news/information (1975–1981)
- The Way It Is – news/information (1967–1969)
- A Way Out – lifestyle/travel (1970–1977)
- The Wayne and Shuster Show – comedy/sketch (1954—1990)
- The Wedding Planners – drama
- The Weekly with Wendy Mesley – news/information
- We're All Gonna Die (Even Jay Baruchel) – documentary (2022)
- We're Funny That Way! – comedy/documentary (2007)
- The West Block – news/information
- West Coast – music/variety (1961)
- What About Mimi? – children's/animated (2000–2002)
- What It's Like Being Alone – animated (2006)
- What on Earth – news/information (1971–1975)
- What Were They Thinking? – comedy/documentary
- What Will They Think of Next – educational (1976–1979)
- What Would Sal Do? – comedy
- What's for Dinner? – lifestyle/cooking
- What's New – news/information
- What's with Andy? – children's/animated (2001–2007)
- Where to I Do? – reality/wedding
- The Whiteoaks of Jalna – drama/action (1972)
- WGB – music/comedy/sketch (1980–1983)
- Wicks – talk/informational (1979–1981)
- Wide World of Sports – sports (1964-1991)
- Wild Canada – science documentary
- Wild Kratts – children's/animated (2011–present)
- Wild Roses – drama (2009)
- Wind at My Back – drama/action (1996–2001)
- Wipeout Canada – game show (2011)
- Witness – documentary (1992–2004)
- Witness to Yesterday – docudrama (1974—1976)
- Wojeck – drama (1966–1968)
- Wok with Yan – lifestyle/cooking (1980–1982)
- Wonder Why? – educational (1990–1994)
- Workin' Moms – sitcom (2017)
- Working the Engels – sitcom (2014)
- The World Challenge – documentary (1986)
- Write On – children's/educational (1976)
- Wynonna Earp – supernatural/drama (2016–2021)

== X ==
- The X – children's/comedy/talk (2004–2005)
- XPM – comedy/sitcom (2004)
- X Company -

== Y ==
- Yakkity Yak – children's/animated (2002–2003)
- Yam Roll – children's/animated (2006–2007)
- Yes You Can – children's (1980–1983)
- Yin Yang Yo! – children's/animated (2006–2009)
- You Can't Do That on Television – children's/comedy/sketch (1979–1990)
- You Gotta Eat Here! – reality/food (2012–2017)
- Young Drunk Punk – sitcom (2015–2016)
- Yukon Harvest – documentary
- Yukon Gold – documentary
- Yvon of the Yukon – children's/animated (1999–2005)

== Z ==
- ZeD – variety (2002–2006)
- Zoe Busiek: Wild Card – drama/mystery (2003–2005)
- Zoo Diaries – documentary (2000–2007)
- ZOS: Zone of Separation – drama (2009)
- Zut! – comedy/sketch (1970–1971)

== See also ==
- List of Canadian game shows
- List of Quebec television series
- List of Australian television series
- List of British television programmes
- List of Indian television series
- List of South African television series
