= Sidney M. Cohen =

Canadian television director

Sidney M. Cohen is a Canadian television director specializing in live multi-camera productions requiring minimal editing and is also a TV program creator.

Cohen was born in Montreal, Quebec and began his career with CFCF-TV and later CBC Television. In 1967, he served on the administrative staff of Expo '67 (the World's Fair) in Montreal, associated with the TV division and worked with notable TV series, including The Ed Sullivan Show.

He relocated to Toronto at the conclusion of Expo '67 to join Screen Gems Productions with TV game show pioneers Dan Enright and Jack Barry. This association began his quiz and game show career.

Cohen spent 3 seasons in Ottawa producing and directing numerous series with the CTV affiliate (CJOH-TV, before returning to Montreal for 8 years, where he produced and directed for CFCF.

In 1972, his first game show for CTV was Puppet People, a series for children featuring live action and puppets interacting. He later produced and directed The Art of Cooking in 1974, the first of 9 cooking series he's directed.

In 1976, Cohen started his independent production company Super People Productions, which created many successful TV series, including the hit game show The Mad Dash, which was revived for Polish TV in 2001. In 1979–80, he directed Say Powww, a local adaptation of the TV POWWW franchise in Los Angeles, hosted by Jack Clark.

Cohen returned to Toronto in 1981 to begin production of Thrill of a Lifetime, one of TV's original reality series, telecast internationally and revived in 2002.

Through the 1980s and 90s, he produced and directed 21 different series including Midday for CBC Television, Test Pattern for MuchMusic, TimeChase a history quiz series, and Just Like Mom.

He directed the daytime Canadian coverage of the 1992 Summer Olympics from Barcelona. He was also executive producer and director of Canada AM, CTV's TV morning news program.

Another pet project included Porthole TV, a show dedicated to cruise ships, for international syndication; Sidney himself hosted many of the episodes, and a new series is in development.

In 2007, Cohen directed his second season of the quiz series for the TVtropolis Network, Inside the Box. In 2008, he directed his fifth season of Cooking with the Wolfman for APTN TV and directed @issue, a current affairs series.

In 2009, he produced and directed his 8th and final season of Reach for the Top (Ontario), for TVOntario as well as the Canadian national final of the academic competition. In 2010, he produced and directed the debut season of Who'd You Rather? for Canada's mensTV channel and in 2012 completed season six of Cooking with the Wolfman for APTN TV.

In 2014 Sidney completed 3 seasons of Accessibility in Action, a lifestyle/magazine series featuring inspiring stories for Accessible Media's AMI-TV.

He currently directs lifestyle programming and some episodes of The Agenda with Steve Paikin for TVO.

Sidney is married to Susan M. Cohen, a Toronto-based artist. They have 2 children, Jay Cohen and Tracy Cohen, and two grandchildren.
