= Music to See =

Music to See may refer to:

- Music to See (1957 TV program), a 1957 Canadian music educational television program
- Music to See (1970 TV program), a 1970–1979 Canadian music television program
