= Maxine Miller =

Canadian actress (born 1928)

- Born: June 18, 1928 (age 98)
- Occupation: Actress
- Years active: 1952–present
- Spouse: John Gerrard (m. 1955; died 1963)
- Children: 2

Maxine Miller (born June 18, 1928) is a Canadian actress who appeared in the first three seasons of Mister Rogers' Neighborhood. In the 1980s, she voiced True Heart Bear in The Care Bears Movie II: A New Generation, and appeared on the animated series My Pet Monster.

Miller also guest starred in Showtime's The Chris Isaak Show and Dead Like Me, and had a role in CinéGroupe's Lion of Oz in 2000.

In 2010, she played the Wallace's neighbor Lesley McKane in the Christmas film Battle of the Bulbs.

== Filmography ==
=== Film ===
Year	Title	Role	Notes
1971	Rip-Off	Mrs. Duncan	
1977	Outrageous!	Peggy O'Brien	
1985	Head Office	Stedman's Secretary	
1986	Care Bears Movie II: A New Generation	True Heart Bear (voice)	
1987	Mr. Nice Guy	Lise's Mom	
1988	Night Friend	Housekeeper	
1989	The Dream Team	Newald's Secretary	
1991	Second Début	(voice)	Short film
1998	Snowden: Raggedy Ann and Andy's Adventure	Grandma (voice)	
2000	Lion of Oz	Seamstress (voice)	
2007	Code Name: The Cleaner	Old Lady	
2008	The Ambassador	Gypsy Rose	Short film
2009	The Shortcut	Grandma	
2009	Dr. Dolittle Million Dollar Mutts	Little Old Lady	Video
2009	Love Happens	Barbara	
2010	Diary of a Wimpy Kid	Elderly Woman	
2013	Percy Jackson: Sea of Monsters	Parcel Store Customer	
2013	Barbie & Her Sisters in A Pony Tale	Madame Cheynet (voice)	Direct-to-video
2014	The Timekeeper	Mavis	
2014	Hattie's Heist		

=== Television ===
Year	Title	Role	Notes
1952, 1957	Encounter	Juliet / Ethel Clark	2 episodes
1954	Howdy Doody	Princess Pan of the Forest	TV series
1962	Playdate	Gloria	Episode: "The Gimmick"
1962–1963	Scarlett Hill	Donna	2 episodes
1968–1971	Mister Rogers' Neighborhood	Nurse Miller	TV series
1972	Norman Corwin Presents		Episode: "Letters from an Only Child"
1975	The Canary	Rita Keller	Television film
1977	Write On	Matilda Voyeur	Television film
1982	The Littlest Hobo	Mrs. Johnson	Episode: "Happy Birthday Mom"
1984	He's Fired, She's Hired	Bergdorf's Saleslady	Television film
1985	Hangin' In		Episode: "The Dusty Queens"
1985	Night Heat	Helen	Episode: "Deadlock"
1987	My Pet Monster	Additional Voices	TV series
1987	Seeing Things	Woman in Greenhouse	Episode: "The Naked Eye"
1987	Anne of Avonlea	Mrs. Albert Pringle	Television film
1987	Friday the 13th: The Series	Birdie	Episode: "A Cup of Time"
1988	Diamonds		Episode: "Family Plot"
1988	Night Heat	Ellen	2 episodes
1988	Double Standard		Television film
1988	Starting from Scratch	Miriam	Episode: "Helen's Parents"
1988	War of the Worlds	Matron #2	Episode: "The Good Samaritan"
1988–1995	Join In!	Emmelina	
1989	Babycakes	Lingerie saleslady	Television film
1989	Bridge to Silence	Saleswoman	Television film
1989	Small Sacrifices	Verla Mae Wells	Television film
1989	Babar	Additional Voices	TV series
1990	Mom P.I.		Episode: "Blue Christmas"
1990	Sanity Clause	Woman Shopper	Television film
1990	Street Legal	Mrs. Kafka	Recurring role (4 episodes)
1991	Funky Fables	Old Hag, Aladdin's Mother (voice)	Episode: "Aladdin" (English Dub)
1991–1992	Scene of the Crime	Various Characters	TV series
1993	Street Justice	Mrs. Tyler	Episode: "Bitter Fruit"
1993	The Commish	Mrs. Sussman	Episode: "All That Glitters"
1994	My Name Is Kate	Doreen	Television film
1994	This Can't Be Love	Wilma	Television film
1994	Party of Five	Mrs. Kelleher	Episode: "Pilot"
1994	The Baby Huey Show	Mama (voice)	Recurring role (13 episodes)
1994	Hurricanes	Additional Voices	TV series
1995	Broken Trust	Hillary Nash	Television film
1995	Stories from My Childhood	(voice)	Episode: "The Snow Queen"
1995	The Surrogate	Mrs. Harris	Television film
1996	The Outer Limits	Helen	Episode: "Paradise"
1997	The Littlest Angel	Understanding Angel (voice)	Video short
1997	Tales from the Far Side 2	(voice)	Television film
1997–1999	Millennium	Justine Miller	Recurring role (5 episodes)
1998	Fat Dog Mendoza	Lady Liberty (voice)	
1999	The Net	Minnie Moscovich	Episode: "In Dreams"
1999	Sherlock Holmes in the 22nd Century	Additional Voices	TV series
1999	Road Rage	Mrs. Tate	Television film
1999	Miracle on the 17th Green	Velda Gibson	Television film
2000	Caitlin's Way	Frieda	Episode: "Stray: Part 2"
2000	Seven Days	Mrs. Claypool	Episode: "Stairway to Heaven"
2000	First Wave	Old Lady	Episode: "Eyes of the Gua"
2000	What About Mimi?	Additional Voices	TV series
2000	The New Adventures of Madeline	Additional Voices	TV series
2001	Alienators: Evolution Continues	Additional Voices	TV series
2001	So Weird	Margaret	Episode: "Grave Mistake"
2001	Ladies and the Champ	Iris	Television film
2001	The Outer Limits	Mrs. Fitzgerald	Episode: "Alien Shop"
2002	Glory Days	Woman	Episode: "Grim Ferrytale"
2002	Mary-Kate and Ashley in Action!	(voice)	2 episodes
2003	Dead Like Me	Quinn Todd	Episode: "A Cook"
2005	Behind the Camera: The Unauthorized Story of Mork & Mindy	Elizabeth Kerr	Television film
2005	Robson Arms	Beatrice Dubois	Recurring role (5 episodes)
2005	Masters of Horror	Dog Lady	Episode: "Deer Woman"
2006	Class of the Titans	Stheno, Pleione, Demeter (voice)	3 episodes
2006	Tom and Jerry Tales	Green Witch (voice)	Episode: "Which Witch"
2006	Smallville	Mrs. McKnight	Episode: "Fragile"
2006	Kyle XY	Secretary	Episode: "Memory Serves"
2007	Supernatural	Attacked woman	Episode: "Bedtime Stories"
2008	Reaper	Mrs. Carmona	Episode: "Hungry for Fame"
2009	Corner Gas	Mrs. Carmichael	Episode: "Reader Pride"
2009	Harper's Island	Julia	3 episodes
2010	Battle of the Bulbs	Lesley McKane	Television film
2011	InSecurity	Granny	Episode: "View to a Nursing Home"
2011	And Baby Will Fall	Mrs. Bindel	Television film
2012	Supernatural	Sheila Tate	Episode: "Hunteri Heroici"
2013	Psych	Mrs. Lauderbach	1 episode
2013	King & Maxwell	Betty Camden	1 episode
2013, 2018	Superbook	Grandma, Rebekah (voice)	2 episodes
2014	Primary	Mrs. Sweitzer (voice)	1 episode
2015	Murder, She Baked: A Chocolate Chip Cookie Mystery	Mrs. Pinter	1 episode
2015	UnREAL	Gran	Episode: "Truth"
2017	Beyond	Gladys	Episode: "Last Action Herio"
2020	Molly of Denali	Betsy Higginbottom (voice)	Episode: "Puzzled"
