= Tracy Cohen =

Canadian television producer

Tracy Cohen is a Canadian television producer. She has worked on numerous series including Kenny vs. Spenny, Mayday, Style Her Famous, Superstar Hair Challenge, Instant Beauty Pageant, Three Takes, Pop Cultured, Sexy Girl, Thrill of a Lifetime, From The Ground Up with Debbie Travis, and Are You Smarter Than a Canadian 5th Grader?

While a student, Tracy was Canada's ambassador to the Hugh O'Brian Youth Leadership Foundation conference at Tufts University in Boston.

As an on-camera performer, in 2000, Tracy hosted one of the first webcasts, Tracy Talk, a teen talk show. Tracy co-hosted episodes of Porthole TV and Tracy also appeared on an episode of Mayday. She was featured doing comedy sketches on occasional episodes of 3 Takes on the Slice Network in Canada.

Tracy currently lives in Ottawa.
