= Just Like Mom and Dad =

Canadian television game show

- Based on: Just Like Mom
- Written by: Sandy Jobin-Bevans, Shoshana Sperling, Lisa Brooke
- Starring: Sandy Jobin-Bevans; Kylee Evans
- Country of origin: Canada
- No. of seasons: 2
- No. of episodes: 43 x 30 minutes + 1 60-minute special

Production
- Executive producers: Mark J.W. Bishop, Matt Hornburg
- Producers: Steve Sloan, Stephen J. Turnbull, Jacquie Rushlow, Gord McLennan, Carolyn Sandler, Ajeeth Parkal, Jessica Capbianco, Caitlin Dosa
- Running time: 30 minute episodes
- Production company: Marblemedia

Original release
- Network: Canada: Yes TV; United States: BYU TV
- Release: January 7, 2018 – April 17, 2019

Just Like Mom and Dad is a Canadian television show created by global media and production company marblemedia. Based on the original 1980s hit game show Just Like Mom, Just Like Mom and Dad is produced in association with Yes TV in Canada and BYU TV in the United States. Just Like Mom and Dad, hosted by husband and wife duo Sandy Jobin-Bevans and Kylee Evans, is a 20-episode primetime family game show that premiered in January 2018.

Each episode of Just Like Mom and Dad features three parent-child pairs competing in three rounds of interactive challenges, all designed to determine how well parents and kids really know each other, running just like the original 1980s version. Correct answers for the first round of questions were worth 5 and 10 points, and 15 and 20 points in the second round. In the taste test, the parents tasted all three treats prepared by the children in the Bake-Off round, then tried to guess which one their child made by holding up numbered paddles, with the team with the lowest score going first. A correct match earned 50 points.

The winning team then faced a 12-section wheel spun by the child, winning whatever prize it landed on. The top prize was an all-inclusive family vacation to Mexico sponsored by Sunwing Airlines, much like the coveted trip to Walt Disney World offered in the original version.

The original Canadian series Just Like Mom ran more than 600 episodes over five seasons from 1980 to 1985 on CTV. marblemedia secured all remake and development rights in 2009 in an agreement with CTV's parent company, Bell Media; as part of the agreement, Bell Media is credited as a production company in the revival of the series.

Producers for Just Like Mom and Dad include Mark Bishop, Matt Hornburg, Steve Sloan, Stephen Turnbull, alongside Rob Sheppard for Yes TV, Jim Bell for BYU TV and Adam Ivers for Omnicom's Highway Entertainment.

At the 8th Canadian Screen Awards in 2020, the series won the Canadian Screen Award for Best Children's or Youth Non-Fiction Program.

== Awards ==
Year	Award	Category
2020	Canadian Screen Awards	Best Children's or Youth Program or Series
