= Michel Lacroix (sportscaster) =

Canadian sports broadcaster

Michel Lacroix (born 1953/54) is a Canadian sportscaster. He is the primary announcer for golf coverage on RDS. Over the years, he has covered the PGA Tour, PGA Tour Champions (formerly the Senior PGA Tour) and the LPGA Tour. He is also the public address announcer for Montreal Canadiens games at the Bell Centre.

A native of Laval, Lacroix first did PA work while in cegep. During this time, he met Pierre Lacroix (no relation), later the general manager of the Quebec Nordiques/Colorado Avalanche, who got him hired as the PA announcer for the Laval National of the Quebec Major Junior Hockey League. His work there got him hired as a reporter for CKAC.

His big break came in 1976, when he announced track and field events at the Olympic Games. As he put it years later, "they told me, 'Well, you probably have an audience of 1.2 billion people,' and you just go, 'OK!'" Longtime Canadiens PA announcer Claude Mouton was impressed by Lacroix' Olympic work, and asked him if he was willing to fill in as PA announcer at the Montreal Forum when needed. When Mouton was promoted to media coordinator in 1977, he asked Lacroix to replace him as PA announcer. Lacroix held the job until 1983, and was on hand for three consecutive Stanley Cup victories. He then returned to full-time reporting for CKAC, but stood in for Mouton from time to time during the second half of the 1980s. When Mouton died of cancer in March 1993, Lacroix was named his replacement, announcing the Canadiens' last Stanley Cup run to date, in 1993.

Lacroix is best known for announcing the Canadiens' arrival on the ice by bellowing, "Mesdames et messieurs, ladies and gentlemen-accueillons nos Canadiens! (Let's welcome our Canadiens!)" It is one of the few times that he doesn't give an announcement in French, then repeats it in English.

In 2024, Lacroix was the public address voice of the Presidents Cup at Royal Montreal Golf Club.
