= Sheldon Turcott =

Canadian television journalist and news anchor

- Born: 1936
- Died: February 18, 2000 (aged 63–64)
- Occupation: broadcaster

Sheldon Turcott (1936 – February 18, 2000) was a Canadian television journalist and news anchor, best known as a reporter and host on CBC Television for four decades. He was a frequent contributor to The National, working at times as a newsreader, foreign correspondent, and executive producer of the program.

From 1985 until his retirement in 1995 he was the regular newsreader on CBC's Midday program. For a brief period prior to that, Turcott commuted to Regina each week to anchor CBKT's 6pm newscast, an effort to boost the station's nearly non-existent ratings.

He was also host of the quiz series TimeChase, and appeared in the feature film Murder at 1600.
