= Fergie Olver =

Canadian sportscaster and game show host (born 1947)

- Born: July 5, 1947 (age 79); Weyburn, Saskatchewan, Canada
- Occupations: Game show host, sportscaster
- Years active: 1965–1996
- Spouse: Catherine Swing (divorced)

Fergus Gerald "Fergie" Olver (born July 5, 1947) is a Canadian former sportscaster and game show host who was a reporter and play-by-play announcer for the Toronto Blue Jays and co-host of the 1980s children's game show Just Like Mom.

== Baseball ==
Olver was born in Weyburn, Saskatchewan and spent most of his youth in Moose Jaw, where he was an all-star high school baseball player and a member of the Moose Jaw Canucks of the Saskatchewan Junior Hockey League.

When Olver was 18, his family moved to Anaheim, California, where he was a standout for the Western High School baseball team. In August 1961, he signed a professional contract with the Chicago White Sox. In 1962, he played 45 games for the White Sox's Class D affiliate, the Harlan Smokies, and batted .283 with 2 home runs, 21 RBI, and 11 stolen bases. The following season he played 13 games for the Class A Sarasota Sun Sox, getting 8 hits in 45 at-bats (.178). He was released by the team in May and joined the Saskatoon franchise of the Western Canadian Baseball League.

== Broadcasting ==
Olver began his television career as a cameraman at CFCN-TV in Calgary. After a four-month stint in Lloydminster, he moved to CHAB radio and CHAB-TV in Moose Jaw. After five years, he moved to Regina, Saskatchewan. He joined CFCF-TV in Montreal in 1969, but left after four months for CFTO-TV in Toronto, where he remained until 1984. He also served as a national broadcaster for CTV Television Network, calling the Wrigley National Midget Tournament, hosting the Kentucky Derby and Queen's Plate horse races, and serving as a dugout reporter during Toronto Blue Jays games. He also co-hosted the children's television game show Just Like Mom (1980–1985), with his wife Catherine Swing, who was also the show's creator. From 1984 to 1989, he was the play-by-play announcer for Blue Jays games on TSN. He was known for his homerism and the catchphrase "how about those Blue Jays". He continued as a reporter for Jays games on CTV and later Baton Broadcasting System until Baton lost its broadcasting rights after the 1996 season. In 2004, he was nominated for the Ford C. Frick Award.

== Horse racing ==
Olver owned a harness racing stable of about 20 horses in the early 1970s. He later formed a large stable with two business partners and by 1984 owned 60 to 70 horses. Olver sold his stable by 1986.
