= Réseau des sports =

Canadian specialty sports channel

- Country: Canada
- Broadcast area: National
- Headquarters: Montreal, Quebec

Programming
- Picture format: 1080i HDTV (downscaled to letterboxed 480i for the SDTV feed)

Ownership
- Owner: CTV Specialty Television
- Parent: The Sports Network Inc.
- Sister channels: Noovo; RDS2; RDS Info; TSN regional feeds

History
- Launched: September 1, 1989 on TSN’s 5th anniversary
- Replaced: TVSQ (1980-1989)

Links
- Website: rds.ca

Réseau des sports (RDS) is a Canadian French language discretionary specialty channel oriented towards sports and sport-related shows. It is available in 2.5 million homes, and is owned by CTV Specialty Television Inc. (Bell Media 80% and ESPN 20%). Its full name (usually prefaced in speech by the French article "le") translates as "The Sports Network", the name of its Anglophone counterpart, TSN.

== History ==
=== September 1, 1989–1990s ===
RDS was launched on September 1, 1989, as a sister network to Labatt's highly successful English-language sports network TSN, but the new network initially was run on a low budget and struggled to obtain rights to major professional sporting events. Despite this, RDS became infamous in its early years for its program Défi Mini-Putt, a weekly miniature golf program best known for its energetic commentator Serge Vleminckx, and his enthusiastic cries of "Birdie!" when a hole in one was scored.

By the early 1990s, the network became more established, obtaining the rights to Montreal Expos, the Quebec Major Junior Hockey League and some Montreal Canadiens games. Rodger Brulotte became the network's second broadcasting star with his enthusiastic colour commentary of Expos games. RDS also covered some of Montreal's other professional sports teams, such as the Montreal Machine WLAF football team, the Montreal Impact soccer team, the Montreal Roadrunners roller hockey team, the Montreal Express lacrosse team, and the Montreal Alouettes Canadian football team. While the Machine, Roadrunners, and Express folded, the partnership between RDS and the Impact and Alouettes helped both the network and the teams to become popular. Much of the rise of popularity of Canadian football in Quebec can be attributed to RDS coverage of Canadian Football League and university games. Its small market (mainly limited to Quebec), however, has meant that its revenues are modest. It has had to offer proportionately modest fees for broadcast rights.

Due to CRTC regulations on the foreign ownership of broadcasters, Labatt was forced to sell both RDS and TSN upon its acquisition by Interbrew in 1995. Labatt's broadcasting assets were sold to a privately held consortium named NetStar Communications, the investors of which included a number of Canadian firms as well as ESPN Inc., which held an interest of about 30 percent. The same CRTC regulations had prevented ESPN from establishing its own separate Canadian sports networks outright, so acquiring a minority stake in RDS and TSN became ESPN's alternative plan to get into the Canadian market.

=== 2000s ===
In 2000, majority ownership of RDS and TSN's parent company NetStar was acquired by Bell Globemedia. ESPN still kept minority ownership, and one year later both RDS and TSN adopted ESPN-style logos.

Also in 2000, the Montreal Expos severed their relationship with the network, complaining that they were not offering enough to broadcast games. The network resumed coverage from 2001 until the team moved to Washington, D.C. after the 2004 season, showing about 50 games a season.

RDS logo (1989–2001)

In 2002, the Montreal Canadiens announced a deal to license its French-language broadcast rights for all of its preseason, season, and playoff games to RDS. This was controversial as it threatened the longest-running television show in Quebec, Radio-Canada's La Soirée du hockey. Days later, an agreement was reached whereby RDS and Radio-Canada would simultaneously broadcast Canadiens games on Saturday nights, saving the show. Within the province of Quebec, this arrangement stopped after the 2003–04 NHL season, and French-language Canadiens broadcasts now air exclusively on RDS. Simulcasted coverage continued in regions that do not receive RDS on analog TV (all of Canada south/west of the Ottawa region) on Radio-Canada until the 2006–07 NHL season. In June 2008, RDS's parent, CTV Inc., acquired the rights to The Hockey Theme after the CBC failed to renew its rights to the theme song. A re-orchestrated version of the tune, which has been the theme song of La Soirée du hockey and Hockey Night in Canada since 1968, has been used for hockey broadcasts on RDS and TSN beginning in the fall of 2008.

=== 2010s ===
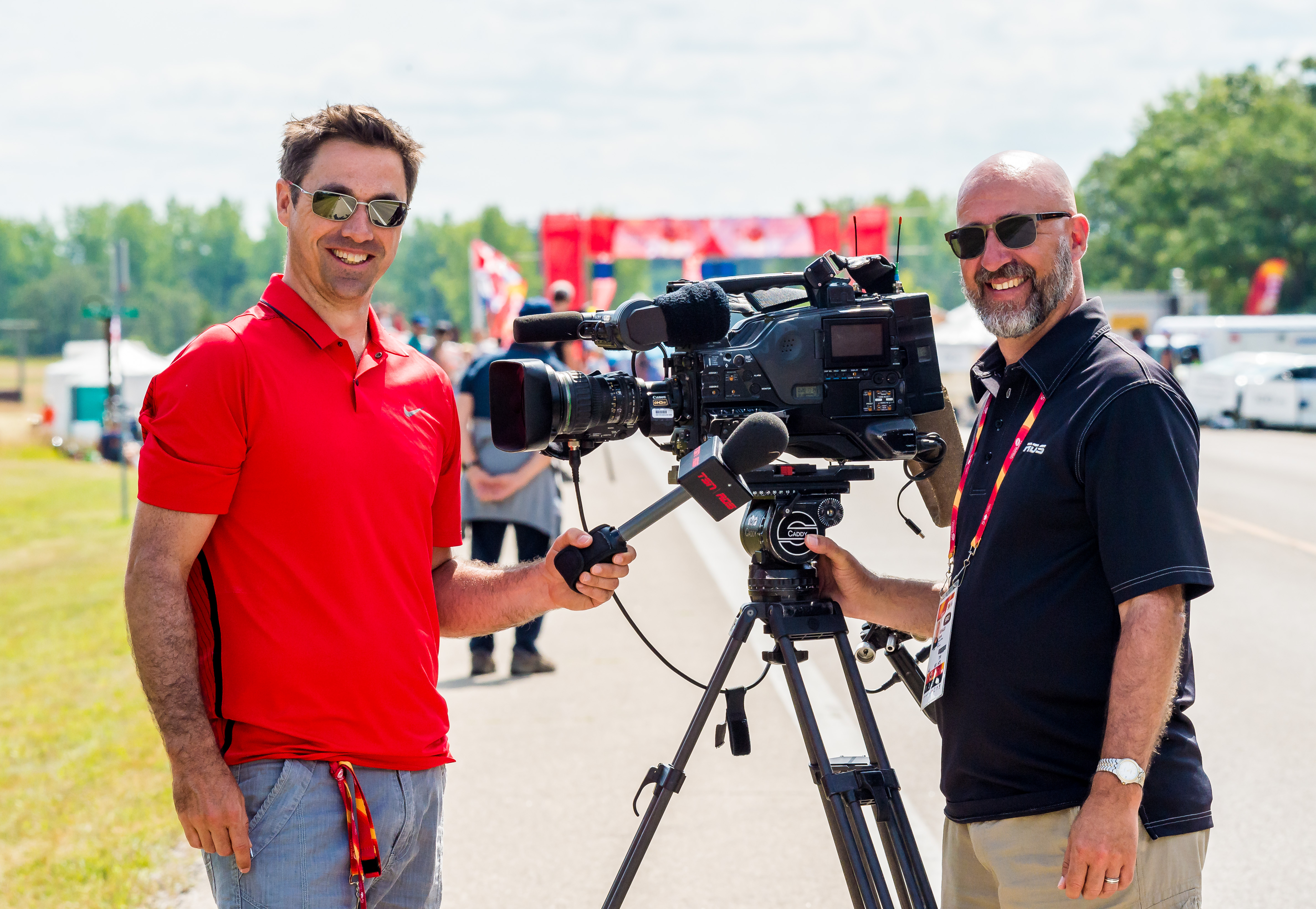
RDS camera team covering a cycling event at the 2017 Canada Summer Games

On September 10, 2010, Bell Canada announced plans to re-acquire 100% of CTVglobemedia's broadcasting arm, including its majority control of TSN. Under the deal, Woodbridge Company Limited, Torstar, and Ontario Teachers' Pension Plan would together receive $1.3 billion in either cash or equity in BCE, while BCE will also assume $1.7 billion in debt (BCE's existing equity interest is $200 million, for a total transaction value of $3.2 billion). Woodbridge has since simultaneously regained majority control of The Globe and Mail, with Bell retaining a 15% interest in December 2010. The deal closed on April 1, 2011, after the CRTC approved the sale on March 7, 2011—the new company became known as Bell Media.

In July 2012, Bell submitted a proposal to the CRTC, requesting permission to convert Montreal's TSN Radio station CKGM to a French-language station with an RDS-branded sports talk format, known as RDS Radio. The planned language and format change was intended to take advantage of CKAC's recent switch from French sports talk to traffic information, and to satisfy the CRTC's ownership caps for Bell's planned acquisition of Astral Media—since Astral already owned the maximum number of English-language stations that one company can own in the market. Bell's original proposal to acquire Astral, and in turn the CKGM proposal, were rejected by the CRTC; under a revised structure (which saw the company divest itself of certain Astral Media properties), Bell would be granted a waiver to maintain ownership of CKGM as an English-language station.

On November 26, 2013, Rogers announced that it had reached a 12-year, $5.2 billion deal to become the exclusive national rightsholder for the National Hockey League, beginning in the 2014–15 season, and would sub-license exclusive French-language rights to TVA Sports (which Rogers has previously partnered with to hold French-language rights to Sportsnet properties), replacing RDS. Previously, due to RDS's position as national French rightsholder, the Canadiens forwent a separate regional rights deal and allowed its games to be part of the national French package. Under the new contract, RDS maintained its broadcast rights to 60 Canadiens games per season under a 12-year deal, but Canadiens games are now subject to blackout outside of the Canadiens' home market region. In January 2014, as part of a wider media rights deal with Bell Media (which included English-language regional television and radio rights for TSN and CFGO), RDS obtained regional broadcast rights to the Ottawa Senators, with 50 regional games in French per season.

In December 2014, as part of deals with Bell, RDS acquired French-language rights to the UEFA Champions League and UFC mixed martial arts, both beginning in 2015.

=== 2020s ===
On May 1, 2022, minor television provider Hay Communications is expected to remove the channel from its channel line-up, due to a sharp increase in cost to deliver the channel.

== Noted RDS programming ==
Sports 30 – Sports news show that provides news and updates regarding major sports in North America and elsewhere.

Canadien Express – Condensed version of the previous Montreal Canadiens hockey game in a 60-minute format.

F1 Express – Similar concept derived from the Canadien Express broadcast.

The Montreal Canadiens hockey game broadcasts formerly varied in name according to the day of the week. Saturday games were known as Le Hockey du Samedi Soir Coors Light. Tuesday games were known as Les Méchants Mardis Molson-Ex while all of the other day or night games were known as Le Hockey Subway des Canadiens. NHL telecasts not involving the Canadiens were simply titled LNH à RDS. Since 2014, games have been known as "Le hockey des Canadiens (Bell/Coca-Cola/McDonald's)." The sponsor affiliations change from time to time.

In January 2013, RDS and TSN announced a documentary series, 24CH, following the team.

=== Dubbed programming ===
Because very few sporting events broadcast by RDS are carried by any other French-language broadcaster, exact simulcasts of other broadcasters on RDS are extremely rare. Even when another French-language broadcaster is carrying the event (e.g., the French Open or soccer matches involving teams from France), RDS will usually use its own commentators. However, for most events that do not either take place in Quebec or involve Quebec-based teams, RDS will rely on the applicable English-language broadcaster (Canadian or American), or some other international broadcast, for the video feed, including any graphics or game updates in the original feed.

The visuals are then dubbed live-to-air with commentators in the RDS studios, who (in most cases) call the game off monitors instead of being on-site. The commentary is not a translation of the English language audio, although the background audio typically remains intact, and relevant information from the English commentary (e.g. injury reports, or explanations of onscreen graphics) may or may not be relayed by the RDS announcers. Interviews aired during the broadcast are undubbed, though RDS announcers will translate and summarize it after completion.

Excepting clean "international" feeds supplied by certain event organizers, the video is usually delayed by several seconds from the originating feed, in order to ensure that irrelevant items (such as U.S. network promos, apart from those for other events which will also air on RDS) are removed from the RDS broadcast. These are usually replaced by other images of the venue, additional game statistics, or RDS promos.

== Sister channels ==
=== RDS2 ===
RDS2 is a Canadian French language discretionary sports specialty channel, acting as the secondary feed of French language television network Réseau des sports, owned by CTV Specialty Television Inc. The channel was launched on October 7, 2011, to coincide with the start of the 2011 MLB post-season; its launch night programming included coverage of the Division Series and a documentary on the Montreal Expos.

As with its English-language equivalent TSN2, it is a secondary outlet for programming that cannot be aired on the main network, and operates under the same Canadian Radio-television and Telecommunications Commission (CRTC) licence as RDS itself.

=== RDS Info ===
RDS Info is a Canadian French language discretionary digital cable 24-hour sports information specialty channel. It is owned by CTV Specialty Television Inc., a division of Bell Media (80%) and ESPN (20%).

The channel was launched on October 21, 2004, under the name Réseau Info-Sports (or RIS).

On January 23, 2012, RIS launched a high definition feed and rebranded as "RDS Info".

== High-definition feed ==
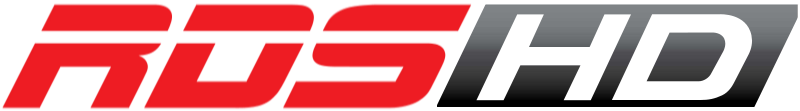

RDS launched an HD edition of the channel on October 3, 2007, in time for the 2007–08 NHL season, making it the only channel to broadcast all games of the NHL's Montreal Canadiens in HD. Since then, most major sporting events have been broadcast in HD; including Formula One, NASCAR, Montreal Alouettes CFL Football, NFL, MLB, PGA Golf and the Euro 2008 soccer tournament amongst others. RDS currently broadcasts its HD signal in 1080i format.

== Notable personalities ==
=== Current ===
- David Arsenault – CFL and NFL play-by-play / Ottawa Senators studio host
- Andrée-Anne Barbeau – Montreal Canadiens studio host (starting this fall)
- Patrice Bernier – Soccer analyst
- Yanick Bouchard – Host of Le 5à7 / Hockey studio host
- Guy Boucher – Hockey analyst
- Olivier Brett – Soccer play-by-play
- Benoit Brunet – Montreal Canadiens analyst
- Guy Carbonneau – Montreal Canadiens analyst
- Patrick Carpentier – NASCAR and Formula 1 analyst
- François-Etienne Corbin – studio host
- Patrick Coté – UFC analyst
- Alain Crête – Montreal Canadiens studio host (will retire at the end of May 2026)
- Vincent Damphousse – Hockey analyst
- Mathieu Darche – Hockey analyst
- Danny Desriveaux – CFL/NFL analyst
- Gilbert Delorme – Hockey analyst
- Marc Denis – Montreal Canadiens colour commentator
- Claudine Douville – Soccer/rugby/women's hockey play-by-play
- Norman Flynn – Ottawa Senators colour commentator / Hockey analyst
- François Gagnon – Hockey columnist and analyst
- Denis Gauthier – Hockey analyst
- Bruno Gervais – Hockey analyst
- Jean Gounelle – Soccer analyst
- Guy Hemmings – Curling colour commentator
- Bruno Heppell – CFL/NFL analyst
- Bertrand Houle – Formula 1 analyst
- Pierre Houde – Montreal Canadiens play-by-play / Formula 1 lap-by-lap
- Wandrille Lefèvre – Soccer analyst
- Michel Lacroix - Golf
- Jocelyn Lemieux – Hockey analyst
- Jasmin Leroux – Ottawa Senators play-by-play (starting this fall)
- Yvon Michel – Boxing analyst
- Yvan Ponton – Tennis play-by-play and 30 Images / Seconde host
- Matthieu Proulx – CFL/NFL host and analyst
- Maxime Talbot – Hockey analyst
- Gaston Therrien – Hockey analyst
- Alexandre Tourigny – NBA analyst
- Mario Tremblay – Montreal Canadiens analyst
- PJ Stock – Hockey analyst
- Alain Usereau – MLB Baseball play-by-play / Curling play-by-play
- Pierre Vercheval – CFL/NFL colour commentator and analyst

=== Former ===
- Michel Bergeron – Montreal Canadiens analyst
- Joel Bouchard – Montreal Canadiens analyst
- Rodger Brulotte – Baseball analyst
- Jacques Demers – Hockey analyst
- Robert Dawson – First President of RDS
- Michel Y. Lacroix – Ottawa Senators play-by-play / Curling play-by-play
- Guillaume Latendresse – Montreal Canadiens analyst
- Patrick Leduc – Soccer analyst
- Dominique Perras – Cycling analyst
- Chantal Machabé – Hockey commentator

== Broadcasting contracts ==
At the end of July 2007, RDS and the Montreal Canadiens extended their exclusive broadcasting rights contract through 2013. The deal includes all of the Canadiens' 82 regular season games and all of their playoff games, if need be (none of this precludes CBC Sports from televising games in English as part of Hockey Night in Canada). Also, RDS has exclusive French broadcasting rights for the NHL All-Star Game and Skills Contest, as well as one NHL game per week that does not involve the Canadiens and a minimum of 40 playoff games for either RDS or RIS. The Canadiens also granted RDS exclusive rights to 'new media' coverage for the team (i.e., cell-phone TV, podcast and others).

Most other broadcast contracts are acquired through TSN and ESPN.

In 2013, RDS lost exclusive broadcasting rights over Montreal Canadiens Saturday night games, the playoffs, the NHL All-Star Game and Skills Contest as the NHL dealt those to Rogers Communications with TVA Sports providing French coverage. However, RDS managed secure the broadcasting rights for 60 regional games as those are still dealt by the Montreal Canadiens.

== International distribution ==
- Saint Pierre and Miquelon (France) – distributed on SPM Telecom (Orange S.A.) systems.

== See also ==
- RDS Cup – Quebec Major Junior Hockey League "Rookie of the Year" award
