= TimeChase =

Television quiz show

TimeChase was a history-based quiz show series created by Sidney M. Cohen and Jay R. Cohen originally telecast on Canada's History Television channel.

Hosted by Sheldon Turcott, it featured questions based on decades in history. It was produced and directed by Sidney M. Cohen. The show ran from 1997 to 1999, and emcee Turcott died shortly after its cancellation. TimeChase was later rerun on GameTV from 2007 to 2011. Catherine Swing served as announcer during the show's first season.

== Round 1 ==
Three contestants compete in this game. One of them was a returning champion. Sheldon announces six decades which act as categories. One decade is a timechase mystery category which remains a secret until it is chosen. The champion picks a decade and then Sheldon reads a question with three choices. The first player to ring in gets to answer. If he/she is right, they get 10 points. If they are wrong, the remaining players will have a choice from the remaining answers (although if the 2nd player is also wrong the 3rd player does not get to answer). 4 questions are in each category. After the category is gone, the player with the last correct answer picks from the remaining categories. The round ends when time runs out. There was no mystery decade during season 2.

== Round 2: Double or Nothing ==
This round was almost the same as the first round. There were 6 more decades (5 in Season 2), but now those decades were all about a certain topic. In Season 1, there was another mystery decade and was only revealed if chosen. Correct answers were worth 20 points and the player had to decide whether or not to answer a follow-up question for another 20 points. A wrong answer takes those points away. The round ends when time runs out or all decades have been covered. The player who with the most points wins a prize and moved on to the Bonus Round.

== Bonus Round ==
Sheldon reveals a topic and the winning contestant has to answer 5 questions. The first question is worth $25, the second, $50, the third, $75, the fourth, $100, and the fifth and final question is worth $250 for a total of $500. If the player answers them all right, he/she wins another prize. The player can stop anytime, but an incorrect answer along the way loses everything, but if there were any questions left, they would be worth $25 each. In any case, the champion comes back next time. Champions can stay for as many as 5 shows. If they make it that far, they win a cruise on the Saint Lawrence River.
