= Klahanie (TV series) =

Canadian nature television series

- Genre: Outdoors
- Presented by: Bob Fortune (1967-1972); Don White (1972-1978)
- Country of origin: Canada
- Original language: English
- No. of seasons: 11

Production
- Producer: Andy Snider
- Production location: Vancouver
- Running time: 30 minutes

Original release
- Network: CBC Television
- Release: 2 March 1967 – 25 August 1978

Klahanie is a Canadian nature television series that aired on CBC Television from 1967 to 1978.

== Premise ==
The series concerned the wilderness, with topics including conservation. "Klahanie" is Chinook Jargon for "the great outdoors".

One episode featured documentary footage and discussion of the Supermarine Stranraer as flown on the Pacific coast.

== Scheduling ==
This half-hour series was broadcast at various times from 2 March 1967 until 25 August 1978, most often on Saturday afternoons.
