= The Mad Dash =

Canadian game show

- Genre: Game show
- Created by: Sidney M. Cohen
- Directed by: Sidney M. Cohen
- Presented by: Pierre Lalonde; Sidney M. Cohen (pilot)
- Narrated by: Nick Holenreich
- Country of origin: Canada
- Original language: English
- No. of seasons: 3
- No. of episodes: 390

Production
- Executive producer: Don Forsyth
- Producer: Sidney M. Cohen
- Camera setup: Multi-camera
- Running time: 30 minutes
- Production companies: Champlain Productions, Inc.; Super People Productions, Ltd.

Original release
- Network: CTV
- Release: 1978 – 1981

The Mad Dash is a Canadian television game show created by Sidney M. Cohen (who hosted the pilot episode) which first appeared in 1978 on Canada's CTV network and ran until 1981. The series proved to be a family favourite based on Canada's BBM ratings, and was also popular in parts of the northern United States, where CTV affiliates were available to Americans living near the Canada–United States border, both over the air and via cable. Pierre Lalonde was the MC, and Nick Holenreich was the announcer for the show, which was taped at the studios of CFCF-TV in Montreal. This classic series is included in the collection of Canadian icons in the 2006 feature film Souvenir of Canada based on the book by Douglas Coupland. The series was later rerun on GameTV in Canada, from 2007 to 2010.

Only a handful of episodes still exist, due to the then common practice known as wiping. Several of these episodes, including the pilot (hosted by series creator Sidney Cohen) and the premiere episode, have been posted to YouTube.

== Gameplay ==
Two pairs of contestants (always composed of a man and a woman), one pair being returning champions, competed in a giant board game, laid out as a winding path across the studio floor. Each team chose one member to be the "Dasher," moving on the board, and one as the "Roller," answering questions at the host's podium. Both Dashers began on the Start space at one end of the board, with the matchups always being man against woman.

The host asked a series of multiple-choice toss-up questions to the Rollers, and the first to buzz-in with the correct answer rolled an oversized six-sided die. A miss gave the opponent a chance to answer and steal the roll. Five of the die's faces were marked with pips to indicate numbers from 1 to 5, while the sixth face showed a dollar sign. If a number came up, the team's Dasher moved ahead that many spaces. The dollar sign added $10 to the team's bank and gave a free roll; if three consecutive dollar signs came up, the third one added $50 to the bank.

In order to win, a Dasher had to reach the Win space at the end of the path by exact count. If the Roller rolled a number higher than the number of spaces needed to reach Win, the Dasher had to use the excess spaces to back up from Win. (E.g. if the Dasher was one space away from Win, a roll of 3 would leave him/her two spaces away.) When a Dasher reached Win, that team kept all cash and prizes they had banked during the game. If they had banked nothing, the Roller rolled the die once and received either $100 for a dollar sign, or $10 times the number rolled.

Teams remained on the show until they lost twice. For every seven games a team won, they were rewarded with the Lucky 7 jackpot, which consisted of $250 cash and an array of merchandise.

== Spaces ==
Spaces on the board awarded cash or prizes, or affected the movement or gameplay in various ways. Some spaces remained constant, while others changed from one game to the next. Spaces took immediate effect, regardless of whether a Dasher landed on them while moving forward or backward.

=== Colour designations ===
The effects of landing on various spaces were differentiated by their colour as follows.

- Blue − Added the prize displayed on the space to the team's bank. If a team landed on a space for a prize they had already banked, they were given a free roll. Both teams could bank the same prize.
- Green − Banked the displayed amount of money, from $50 to $250. One green space marked "Double Money" would double the team's entire cash total.
- Red − A negative effect, such as moving backward or losing cash/prizes.
- Yellow − Other effects, such as moving forward or granting a free roll.

In some episodes, orange spaces were used either in place of red and yellow ones, or in addition to them. These spaces affected the gameplay in special ways, such as by requiring the Dashers to trade places.

=== Common spaces ===
- Roll Forward / Roll Back – Roller rolls again and Dasher moves forward or backward, respectively.
- Roll Over – Roller rolls again and opposing Dasher moves forward.
- Free Roll / Miss Turn – An extra roll for the team or their opponents, respectively; originally, the Miss Turn space meant that the Roller for the opposing team received the next question unopposed.
- Change Places – The Dashers switch places, and the one who had originally landed on "Change Places" receives the effect of the space on which he/she lands.
- Back to Start – Dasher returns to Start.
- Dash – The Dasher is asked a true/false question, and the Roller rolls the die. A correct answer moves the Dasher forward, but a miss moves him/her back.
- Breakaway – Added in season 2; the Roller rolls the die, and the Dasher is given that many seconds (from 1 to 5) to run ahead on the board. A bell is rung to start and end the Breakaway, and the Dasher must stop on the space he/she is touching when the second bell rings. If the Dasher makes it to the Win space before time expires, that team wins the game.
- Dice Game – The Roller rolls two dice. If both show dollar signs, the team wins $100 and another roll. Otherwise, the Dasher moves ahead according to the total.
- Card Game – The Roller draws one playing card from an oversized deck. If a number card is drawn, the Dasher moves ahead that many spaces; an ace counts for one space. However, if a face card (king, queen, jack) is drawn, the Roller rolls the die and the Dasher moves back that many spaces.
- Happy Birthday – The Dasher spins two concentric wheels. The outer wheel has six sections, showing five different cash amounts and an insurance policy; the inner wheel has 12 sections, one for each month of the year. If the outer wheel lands on a cash amount, the team banks the cash, or double the value if the inner wheel lands on the Dasher's birth month. However, if the outer wheel stops on the insurance policy, the team receives one to protect against losing their bank.
- Go Broke / Return Prizes – The team forfeits their entire cash total, or only their banked prizes, respectively. An insurance policy can be used once to negate either penalty. Cash and prizes won in previous games are not affected. A variation called "Broke or Back" acted as a "Roll Back" space if the team had no cash at the time they landed on it.
- Pot of Gold – A collection of prizes that the team keeps regardless of the outcome of the game.
- Shooting Star – The Dasher throws a maximum of three Velcro-covered balls at a game board with several star-shaped prize and cash spaces. The team wins the first prize or cash amount hit by any of the Dasher's throws. One space is marked "Lose Loss," and will erase a team's first loss (if any) from their record if claimed.
- Thin Ice – The Dasher is asked a true/false question. A correct answer allows the team to steal one prize from the opponents' bank, while a miss allows the opponents to steal one instead; if there are no prizes to steal, the team is allowed to steal up to $50 cash from the opponents' bank if they have any. Otherwise, the team may advance up to five squares at a cost of $10 each.
- Mini-game – The space is marked with the name of a mini-game which the Dasher must play. Position and/or prizes may be affected by the outcome.
- Brains or Brawn – The Dasher must choose to answer a question or attempt a physical stunt, and the Roller rolls the die. Success allows the Dasher to move forward, but failure requires him/her to move back.

== Mini Dash ==
If a game ended without leaving enough time at the end of the episode to start a new one, one or more audience members were called to the stage, one at a time, to play a Mini Dash. Each member played for a different prize. Originally, they would simply have to answer two out of three questions to win the prize. Later in the run, they chose one of five envelopes, three of which had three questions (still requiring two correct answers to win), while the other two hid an "instant win" and "instant loss", respectively.

== International versions ==
The Mad Dash has also been produced internationally. The most successful foreign version of the format was Duety do mety (literally translating to Duos to the finish line) created for Polish public broadcaster, TVP2, and aired from 1998 to 2000. It was hosted by actor Mirosław Siedler.

== See also ==
- List of Quebec television series imports and exports
