= Wicks (TV program) =

Canadian talk show television series

- Genre: Talk show
- Presented by: Ben Wicks
- Country of origin: Canada
- Original language: English
- No. of seasons: 2

Production
- Production company: J.T. Ross Associates

Original release
- Network: CBC Television
- Release: 10 September 1979 – 30 January 1981

Wicks is a Canadian talk show that aired on CBC Television from 1979 to 1981.

== Premise ==
Cartoonist Ben Wicks hosted this talk show series. Some interviews were recorded on location.

== Scheduling ==
This half-hour series was broadcast weekdays at 12:30 p.m. from 10 September to 16 November 1979, then from 7 January to 23 May 1980. Its second season was broadcast weekdays at 1:30 p.m. from 8 September 1980 to 30 January 1981. Repeats were broadcast from June to September 1981.
