= On the Evidence =

1975 Canadian legal drama television series

- Genre: Legal drama
- Written by: Barry Morgan
- Directed by: Bryn Matthews
- Narrated by: Ken Haslam
- Country of origin: Canada
- Original language: English
- No. of seasons: 3

Production
- Producer: David Pears
- Running time: 60 minutes

Original release
- Network: CBC Television
- Release: 21 June 1975 – 15 September 1977

On the Evidence is a Canadian legal drama television series that aired on CBC Television from 1975 to 1977.

== Premise ==
This series presented dramatisations of court trials, some of which were based on real cases. Judges, lawyers and court clerks were portrayed by Canadian Bar Association members while actors played the accused and the witnesses. Some studio audience members were chosen to form the jury. The proceedings were recorded over two hours then condensed for the hour-long broadcast.

== Scheduling ==
This hour-long series was broadcast as follows (times in North American Eastern):

Day	Time	Season run		Notes
Saturday	10:00 p.m.	21 June 1975	30 August 1975	
Tuesday	8:00 p.m.	25 May 1976	17 August 1976	
Thursday	10:00 p.m.	28 July 1977	15 September 1977	
Monday to Friday	1:00 p.m.	2 July 1979	6 August 1979	rebroadcast
Friday	11:45 p.m.	28 April 1980	12 September 1980	rebroadcast
