= Denny's Sho =

- Genre: Music
- Starring: Denny Doherty
- Country of origin: Canada
- Original language: English
- No. of seasons: 1
- No. of episodes: 13

Production
- Production location: Halifax
- Running time: 30 minutes

Original release
- Network: CBC Television
- Release: 1 June – 7 September 1978

Denny's Sho is a Canadian music variety television series that aired on CBC Television in 1978.

== Premise ==
Denny Doherty, of The Mamas & the Papas, was host of this Halifax-produced variety series. The Lovin' Spoonful's John Sebastian and Zalman Yanovsky were guests on one episode. Other visiting artists were Salome Bey, Tom Gallant, Gloria Kaye, Moe Koffman, Marie-Paule Martin, Murray McLauchlan, Original Caste, Ryan's Fancy and Ken Tobias. At one point, Doherty sang "When I'm Sixty-Four" accompanied by his father playing a tuba.

Denny's Sho included the first public performance of the remaining members of The Mamas & the Papas since Cass Elliot's death four years earlier.

== Scheduling ==
This half-hour series was broadcast on Thursdays at 9:00 p.m. (Eastern) from 1 June to 7 September 1978.
