= APTN Mainstage =

- Genre: variety television
- Country of origin: Canada

Production
- Running time: 30 minutes

Original release
- Network: APTN
- Release: January 1996

APTN Mainstage is a half-hour Canadian musical television series showcasing First Nations music from across Canada and North America. It aired on APTN.
