= Just Like Mom =

Canadian television game show

- Created by: Catherine Swing
- Directed by: Sidney M. Cohen; Michael Hooey; Ian Murray; Rick Watts
- Presented by: Stephen Young (1980-1981); Fergie Olver (1981-1985); Catherine Swing (1981-1985)
- Narrated by: Fergie Olver (1980-1981)
- Country of origin: Canada
- Original language: English
- No. of seasons: 5

Production
- Producer: Paul Burford
- Production locations: CFTO-TV Studios; Scarborough, Toronto, Ontario
- Production companies: Just Like Mom Productions; Fergie Olver Productions

Original release
- Network: CTV
- Release: 1980 – 1985

Related
- ‘’Just Like Mom and Dad’’

Just Like Mom is a Canadian television game show that ran from 1980 to 1985 on CTV. A total of 595 episodes were taped at CFTO-TV Studios in the Toronto suburb of Scarborough, Ontario. It was hosted by Stephen Young during the show's first season, but from the second season on, it was hosted by the husband-and-wife duo of Fergie Olver and the show's creator Catherine Swing. Olver announced the series during its first season. The format was to determine which child and mother knew each other the best through answer-matching as well as the memorable Bake-off Challenge. Three teams, consisting of a young child and his or her mother (or occasionally father), competed on each episode. Repeats aired on the launch schedule for YTV in 1988, and on GameTV from 2008 to 2010.

Fergie Olver shared on the Toronto Mike'd Podcast that a young Jim Carrey was once considered as a potential host for the program, although he was never invited to audition.

On September 22, 2009, marblemedia announced they acquired the rights to Just Like Mom and plan to create a new and updated version called Just Like Mom and Dad. In 2017, the new show was picked up by Yes TV in Canada and BYU TV in the United States for broadcast in 2018.

== Gameplay ==
=== Question rounds ===
The parents were secluded offstage while the children answered several questions. Early in the show's run, they would choose from one of five categories for the questions, while later in the run, a specific question was pre-assigned to each team. Each host would alternate between asking each child, making two cycles of the three children. Afterwards, the parents would come back and they would be posed the same questions to see if they could match the answers their children gave, using a format similar to The Newlywed Game. A correct match on the first questions earned 10, and the second was worth 15.

For the second question round, the process repeated with the parents answering first and the children trying to match. Correct matches in this round were worth 20 points for the first question, and 25 for the second.

=== The bake-off/taste test ===
Between the two question rounds, the children had a bake-off to complete a given recipe, which came from the Robin Hood Just Like Mom Cookbook, in 60 seconds. (There were some episodes where the time limit was 90 seconds but it was later changed back.) They were given all the basic ingredients (as well as some unorthodox ones) and were allowed to use whatever they wanted in their creations.

After the second question round, the parents tasted each of the three creations while the children were taken to another part of the stage. They had 30 seconds to taste each of the numbered dishes and then decide which one they thought their child made by holding up a numbered sign (later a ping pong paddle) at the same time as their child at the other part of the stage with the team with the lowest score going first. A correct match was worth 50 points.

Producer Paul Burford revealed on the Toronto Mike'd Podcast that during this round, Catherine Swing would survey each contestant to ensure they were preparing the recipe with some accuracy, in efforts to prevent families from scamming the bake-off by pre-set strategies, such as using excessive amounts of ketchup and other approaches.

=== Bonus round ===
The team with the highest score spun a wheel divided into 16 sections marked with different prizes; they won whatever prize the wheel landed on. If two teams tied in the main game, both would spin the wheel for a prize. The grand prize was a trip for two to Walt Disney World; it was featured on four slots on the wheel. In the case of twins playing, each child would spin once; if the first spin landed on the Disney World trip, the second spin would be voided. In later seasons, all contestants received a prize of a trip to Camp Onondaga, one of the oldest private summer camps in Canada. While there were a collection of prizes available on the prize wheel, including prizes from sponsors such as Chuck E. Cheese's, Robin Hood Flour, Playmobil and John Deere, the grand prize to Walt Disney World was the most memorable and coveted prize available.

== 2010s viralty ==
YouTube videos of the show went viral in the 2010s. Much of the viral attention focused on criticism of the behaviour of the host Olver with children, including kissing them on the mouth, sometimes against their wishes.
