= Défi mini-putt =

Canadian television series

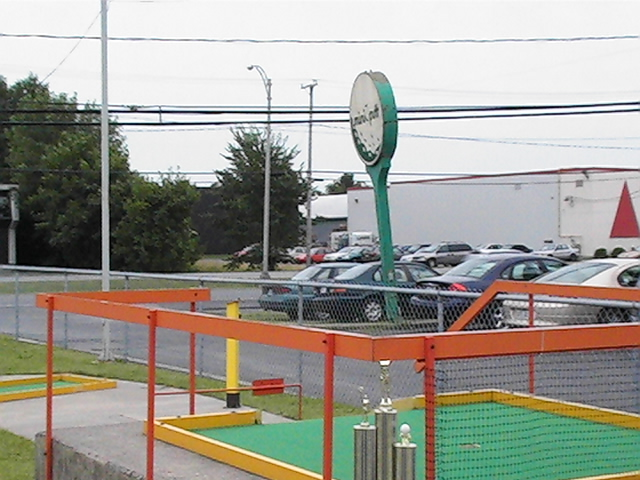
Mini-putt course in Saint-Hyacinthe, Quebec

Défi mini-putt (Mini-putt Challenge) was a weekly show in the early 1990s on the Quebec cable sports network, Réseau des sports. It was the first professional miniature golf tournament to be regularly broadcast in Quebec.

Each course had exactly the same design, with some natural tweak, and every hole was a par 2. The Mini-Putt franchise used a minimalist design, featuring only hills, bunkers, and a few obstacles.

== History ==
=== Golden age (1970–1988) ===
The show appeared on TVSQ and was called L'Heure du Mini-Putt (Mini-Putt Hour). In 1989, Réseau des sports was born with Défi mini-putt as a regular program. Réseau des sports was having trouble getting the broadcast rights to major sporting events, so chose niche local events such as mini-golf to fill the slots The show was renewed up until 1998. Featuring players in the show included Jocelyn Noël, Carl Carmoni (seigneur des birdies et champion mondial du Québec), Sylvain Cazes, Gilles Buissières & wife Lucie, Ron Poliseno ("Le Grand Requin Blanc"), and Suzanne and André Buist. The show was hosted by Serge Vleminckx, whose exuberant shouts of "Birdie!" for a hole in one, "la normale!" for two strokes, and "le bogey!" for three strokes, helped attract a cult following for the show.

In 1990-1991, the audience of the show reached 1.2 million viewers.

By the end of the 1990s, the Mini-Putt chain began to falter, and the owners refused to continue to finance the show. In a meeting of the franchisers, when they decided to stop the TV show, Marcel Rocheleau, the owner of Mini-Putt Louiseville, said, "This will be the end and we will pick-up the bones." Ron Poliseno, owner of Mini-Putt St-Eustache and Fabreville, along with 10 other owners, took a gamble and went back on TV for another two years. At that time there was still 51 franchises, but as of 2001, they found out that the TV was the reason of success. Then they started to fold up one by one. Today, three original Mini-Putt are still operating, but they all have to rely on a second product - ice cream, fast food, or a driving range.

Jocelyn Noel went on to participate in American miniature golf tournaments (PPA of Putt-Putt Golf), as well as Martin Ayotte, 4 times appearances. Serge Vleminckx went on to announce games for the short-lived Montreal Roadrunners roller hockey team. A lot of ancient players started to organize Mini-putt tournament during the summer where courses still exist.

=== Revival (since 2005) ===
Since 2005, a lot of new talents have emerged from the underground scene, which led to new tournaments organised by past champion Carl Carmoni and fellow enthusiasts, and the creation of the Mini-putt league of Sorel-Tracy. These efforts culminated in 2012 with the presentation of the Coupe Mini-Putt 2012, a webserie of 4 episodes that followed the former Défi Mini-Putt's format. Serge Vleminckx reprised his role and was assisted by Carl Carmoni and Jocelyn Noël as analysts. In May 2020, RDS broadcast this webserie resulting in great ratings.

The competition and tournaments are still alive, managed by Carl Carmoni and his group. Ron Poliseno owner of the Trade Marks Mini-Putt L'Authentique and Mini-Putt, has been approached by TV networks, to bring back the TV show and promote the series but the financing is still and always the problem.

During the Covid pandemic, the game has found a new niche of casual players in Eastern Canada, and saw the birth of new mini-putt stars such as Dany Labarre. A 10-episode TV series recorded in 2012 was broadcast on RDS after the 2021 Olympics.

== Appellation ==
Linguistically, the show prompted "mini-putt" to become the favoured Québécois term for miniature golf, while in the rest of Canada and the United States, the terms "miniature golf", "mini-golf", "crazy golf", and occasionally "putt-putt" are used interchangeably.

== Holes description ==
The 18 holes of the "Mini" course usually played by the contestants were:

1. Le totem, with three twelve-inch-tall wooden totem poles
2. La croix, a course in the shape of a cross
3. La courbe, a slightly inclined curve
4. La discothèque, a sideways T-shaped course
5. Le billard, a long rectangular course played by banking as in billiards
6. Le hockey, an elongated L-shaped course
7. La rivière, a ramp to jump over a river
8. Le putter, a U-shaped course
9. Le chameau, with two steep hills
10. Les trappes, a ramp bordered by two traps
11. Le carrefour, a Y-shaped course
12. Le slalom, with two off-centered gentle hills
13. Les laurentides, with three steep hills
14. Le zig-zag, a stretched Z-shape course
15. Le monstre, an irregular incline
16. La culotte, similar to Le putter
17. L'équerre, a curved metal bracket leading to the hole
18. Le plateau, a steep 2 feet high incline

In the 1990s, the Maxi course was also played occasionally on the show. Its 18 holes were:

1. Les cailloux, with two traps avoided by hitting a metal bar
2. L'escalier, a concrete staircase leading to the hole
3. La tablette, a square flat-topped step
4. Le recoin, a course similar to La courbe on the Mini course but including a trap
5. Les montagnes russes, a long course made of gentle hills
6. La cachette, a course where the hole is hidden in front of the player
7. La coulée, a U-shaped concrete ramp leading to the hole
8. Le triangle, a course where a metal triangle is hit to reach the hole
9. Le nez, resembling a nose seen sideways
10. L'Achaland, two gentle curves bordering traps
11. Les sentinelles, where the hole is guarded by two upright metal pipes
12. La soucoupe, with a circular depression leading to the hole
13. Le facile, with gentle hills leading to the hole
14. La fourche, a Y-shaped course with a concrete step
15. Le super monstre, an irregular incline with a trap
16. Les collines, where the hole is guarded by three small hills
17. La porte, where the hole is reached by hitting an angular bracket
18. La pente douce, a shallow 2 feet high incline with a metal obstacle

A third course, the Midi, was designed but never constructed.

== See also ==
- Miniature golf
