= Commonwealth Televiews =

- Genre: Documentary
- Country of origin: Canada
- Original language: English
- No. of seasons: 2

Production
- Running time: 15 minutes

Original release
- Network: CBC Television
- Release: 13 January 1957 – 6 April 1958

Commonwealth Televiews is a Canadian documentary television series that aired on CBC Television from 1957 to 1958.

== Premise ==
This series featured reports from various nations of the British Commonwealth for Canadian audiences, produced in co-operation with Britain's Information Service. Topics included the Arts Council of Great Britain, life in contemporary Harlow, an interview with Kwame Nkrumah, who was Prime Minister of the Gold Coast (now Ghana), nuclear power featuring Robert McKenzie's interview with John Cockcroft and an interview of Robert Scott, Commissioner-General for Southeast Asia, by Matthew Halton.

== Scheduling ==
This 15-minute series was broadcast Sundadays at 12:15 p.m. (Eastern) in two seasons, six episodes from 13 January to 17 February 1957, then several episodes from 2 February to 6 April 1958.
