= Puttnam's Prairie Emporium =

Canadian children's television series

Puttnam's Prairie Emporium is a half-hour Canadian children's television series which aired for two seasons, from 1988 to 1990, on CTV before being syndicated on YTV. The series was created and produced by Bruce Edwards, and a total of fifty-one episodes were taped at CKCK-TV in Regina, Saskatchewan, Canada, beginning in 1988.

The series was centered on the titular emporium, a long-standing general store run by eccentric owner Mr. Puttnam (George Alexander), whose daughter Ellen (Coral Crum) and grandchildren Katy (Brandie Mickleborough) and Mark (Jeremy Drummond) have moved in with him. Although the emporium retained the look of an old-fashioned five-and-dime (and the set for the store itself was virtually the only location seen throughout the show's run), there were "things there...you would not believe" and "new adventures all the time" (as mentioned in the show's theme song) which were often of a fantastical nature.

The aspects of the series were also reflected in the remainder of the regular cast, which included Ivan (Billy Morton), a scientist who developed a Time Closet in the confines of the store; Caldicott C. Catt (voiced by John Wilson), a saxophone-playing cat who lived in a basket on the store's counter; and Benjamin (voiced by Rosco Bell), a talking beefalo head hanging on the wall behind the counter. The characters would also frequently travel to alternate dimensions to battle dinosaurs, zombies, and robots.

The aforementioned Time Closet was the catalyst for several episodes involving time travel, to and from both the past and the future. In these episodes, regular cast member George Alexander played Mr. Puttnam's grandfather in sepia-toned scenes set in the early 20th century as well as an older Mark in the future, who would eventually have a daughter named Leonard (who, in turn, travelled back in time to meet her father as a young man) and take over control of the emporium. (One such episode also revealed that at some point in the future, the Province of California had broken off from the mainland of North America and been renamed Trudeau Island.)

Another aspect of the show — almost an "inside joke" — was the use of two "utility players" who appeared in each episode as different guest characters. Ian Paul, an actor with a flair for foreign accents, was one of the players through the series; Drew Snider, another character actor, who left the series midway through the first season. They would play gangsters in one show, then battling comic book characters in another (Snider was Captain Marvellous and Paul the evil Doctor Venom). Snider also played Gene, a hippie genie whose bottle was lost at Woodstock and turned up at the Emporium, Insp. Hector Vector, Apollo and Albert Einstein. Paul's roles included a customer who bought cough drops that made him cough, and another (unnamed) superhero.

A rare contribution to a Canadian national television network from a prairie affiliate, Puttnam’s developed a small but highly enthusiastic following (which persists to this day) for its writing and characters. Despite its ingenuity and following, there are no known plans to broadcast the series again. A DVD release was rumoured for the second quarter of 2008, but according to a posting on the X-Entertainment blog in June 2004 by "Puttnam's Lyrics Writer", the master tapes were likely destroyed years earlier. Some episodes have appeared on YouTube.
