= South Asian Veggie Table =

- Starring: Karen Johnson, Ronica Sajnani
- Country of origin: Canada
- No. of seasons: 4
- No. of episodes: 52

Production
- Running time: approx. 30 minutes

Original release
- Network: Omni Television
- Release: 1998 – present

South Asian Veggie Table is a cooking show first produced in 1998 for the Omni Television, an Ontario television network in Canada. It is a half-hour TV show of Indian and South-Asian vegetarian cooking hosted by Karen Johnson and Ronica Sajnani. The show has been syndicated internationally.

Johnson and Sajnani started a new cooking show called South Asian Tasting Table which is not a vegetarian show.

== List of episodes ==
Each episode teaches two recipes.

No.	Title	Original release date
1	"Samosas, Vegetarian Stir Fry"	TBA
2	"Vegetarian Muffuletta, Potato & Leek Soup"	TBA
3	"Vermicelli Indian Style, Patak's Stuffed Pita Pockets"	TBA
4	"Red Dragon Pie, Asparagus Fajitas"	TBA
5	"Green Peppers & Potato Subzi (Curry), Vegetable Lemon Pillau"	TBA
6	"Okra (Bhindi Ki Sabzi), Masala Chanas"	TBA
7	"Palak Paneer, Sambhar"	TBA
8	"Spinach Ravioli, Green On Green Gumbo"	TBA
9	"Zucchini Curry, Dal Palak"	TBA
10	"Jambalaya, Mushroom Risotto"	TBA
11	"Vegetable Quiche, Butternut Squash and Ginger Soup"	TBA
12	"Maida Dosai, Aloo Parathas"	TBA
13	"Rajma, Hot and Sour Squash (Pumpkin)"	TBA
14	"Veggie & Bean Hotpot, Thai Pasta Primavera"	TBA
15	"Scarborough Fair Stew, Mixed Bean Balti"	TBA
16	"Spinach & Rice Stuffed Cabbage Leaves, Tamale Pie"	TBA
17	"Sabzi Kofta, Spicy BBQ Kebabs"	TBA
18	"Four Mushroom Thai Curry, Sweet Corn Cakes"	TBA
19	"Seven Veggie Couscous, Harvest Mushroom Casserole"	TBA
20	"Veggie Pizza (Indian twist!), Pasta in White Wine Sauce"	TBA
21	"Stuffed Pepper Loaf, Goat Cheese Salad"	TBA
22	"Tofu, Cashews and Vegetable Stir Fry, Kongnamul Kimchi (Soybean Sprout Kimchi)"	TBA
23	"Spinach and Orzo Pie, Stuffed Tomatoes"	TBA
24	"Tempeh Scaloppine with Sorrel Cream, Tofu Burgers"	TBA
25	"Carrot & Cashew Nut Roast, Baked Stuffed Potatoes"	TBA
26	"Tabouleh, Moong Daal"	TBA
27	"Green Mango Chutney, Plaintain Curry"	TBA
28	"Cilantro Rice, Curd (yogurt) Rice"	TBA
29	"Kadhi & Dumplings, Koki"	TBA
30	"Lentil, Red Currant & Fava Bean Salad, Tuscan Bean Soup"	TBA
31	"Ekuri (Parsi Scrambled Eggs), Upama"	TBA
32	"Pumpkin Halva, Vermicelli Payasam"	TBA
33	"Spanakopita, Artichoke Moussaka"	TBA
34	"Hot and Sour Squash (Pumpkin), Rajma"	TBA
35	"Aloo Palya, Dam Aloo"	TBA
36	"Bagaira Baingan, Stuffed Green Chilies"	TBA
37	"Masaledar Karelas (Bitter Gourd), Bamboo Shoot Curry with Rice & Pickles"	TBA
38	"Rutabaga & Kale Pie, Kohlrabi Appetizer"	TBA
39	"Vegetarian Chili, Gazpacho"	TBA
40	"Veggie Pakoras, Fiery Yam Fritters"	TBA
41	"Cauliflower Soup with Red Pepper & Ginger Sauce, Stuffed Vegetable Marro"	TBA
42	"Mezban: Vegetable Biryani, Mezban: Tomato Chutney & Couscous"	TBA
43	"Subzi Achar, Spicy Carrots and Asparagus"	TBA
44	"Artichoke Cassarole, Stuffed Artichokes"	TBA
45	"Falafel with Tahini, Zucchini Quesdillas"	TBA
46	"Sindhi Besan Curry, Paneer Matar"	TBA
47	"Eggplant / Feta Wrap, Roma Tomato Walnut Pesto Wrap"	TBA
48	"Kali Daal, Cabbage with Green Peas"	TBA
49	"Veggie Ragout, Sauteed Greens with Currants"	TBA
50	"Rasam, Mulligatawny Soup"	TBA
51	"Berry & Rhubarb Compote, Berry & Peach Crumble"	TBA
52	"Rice & Zucchini Frittata, Goat Cheese & Leek Galette"	TBA

== See also ==
- Lists of Canadian television series
