= Canada in View =

Canadian documentary television series

Canada in View is a Canadian documentary series aired on several stations affiliated with the CTV Television Network from the late 1980s to early 1990s. The program was co-operatively produced by participating stations, each contributing long-form documentaries about local issues on a rotating basis. Although it apparently aired solely on CTV affiliates, it is not clear whether the program was ever officially part of CTV's network schedule.

The series used a loophole in CRTC regulations of the era, which allowed each station involved in the production of such a series to count it as a "local" program for the purposes of fulfilling its conditions of licence, even if the program did not contain local content on a weekly basis. Since production responsibilities were rotated among all stations, participation in Canada in View could thus dramatically reduce a given station's local production requirements.

The CRTC announced in 1989 it would close the loophole for information and sports programming, which included Canada in View, though it provided a temporary reprieve for existing productions, but only until the end of participating stations' licence terms. In most cases this was August 1994, by which point the series had disappeared. Whether this decision directly led to the demise of the series is unclear; one columnist would later place the blame on Baton Broadcasting (at that time the largest CTV-affiliate ownership group) for pulling out of the series.
