= Cooking with the Wolfman =

Cooking With the Wolfman is a cooking series first produced for the Aboriginal Peoples Television Network, an aboriginal television network in Canada.

The series is created, executive produced, and hosted by chef David Wolfman, whose home community is the Xaxli'p First Nation in British Columbia, western Canada, and who serves as professor of culinary arts at George Brown College in Toronto. Also executive produced by Larry Pasemko, this series combines traditional North American Native cuisine with modern dishes.

The series is now in its eighth season, produced by David Wolfman and directed for the last 5 seasons by Sidney M. Cohen.
