= Living Clean =

Living Clean is a Canadian television program, and Canada's only live interactive weekly talk show designed to assist individuals suffering with addiction and/or mental illnesses. According to the show's website, it "reaches out and offers up choices and encouragement to the addict and their families through sharing our experience, strength and hope."

== Host Glenn Allan ==
Living Clean host and executive producer Glenn Allan is a recovering alcoholic and cocaine addict. With assistance from medical experts, counselors, law enforcement personnel and other professionals, he interacts with viewers to identify problems, locate additional information resources, and refer those in need to agencies that can provide additional services and care.

Since 2001, Glenn has been making a powerful and positive impact with a presentation titled, Giving Kids A Chance. He appears at schools, community centers, and other venues where young people congregate, and uses his own story of personal trauma and transformation to offer hope. His direct and honest approach puts kids and teens at ease and allows them the opportunity to open up and seek assistance.

== Show Format ==
Living Clean is aired live. Glenn is frequently joined by a special co-host who is also a trauma survivor or recovering alcoholic or addict. Viewers can call in, share their stories, and receive support and feedback from Glenn and that week's co-host.

== Show Times ==
Living Clean airs Sunday evenings from 11:30 p.m. until 12:30 a.m., on CTS TV (Ontario). It is also available on Bell ExpressVu Channel 651 and Star Choice- Channel 355

In 2015, it was announced that after a 5-year run Living Clean has gone off the air.
