= CBC Selects =

2014 Canadian television anthology series

- Genre: Anthology
- Country of origin: Canada
- No. of seasons: 1

Original release
- Network: CBC Television
- Release: October 5, 2014

CBC Selects is a Canadian television anthology series, which premiered on CBC Television on October 5, 2014. The series will present a variety of programs from other public broadcasters around the world, including the BBC and the Australian Broadcasting Corporation.

The first program airing as part of CBC Selects is the Australian drama series Janet King.

The second program will be the BBC's nature documentary Life Story.
