= Atlantic Summer =

- Country of origin: Canada
- Original language: English
- No. of seasons: 1

Production
- Producers: Jack O'Neil (Halifax); Wayne Guzwell (St. John's, 1978); Leo Williams (St. John's, 1979)
- Running time: 30 minutes

Original release
- Network: CBC Television
- Release: 9 August 1978 – 27 July 1979

Atlantic Summer is a Canadian informational television series that aired on CBC Television from 1978 to 1979.

== Premise ==
The series originated from Atlantic Canada. In the first season, two weeks were produced from Halifax, Nova Scotia while another two weeks were produced from St. John's, Newfoundland and Labrador. Halifax hosts were Denny Doherty and Sharon Dunn while Shirley Newhook of St. John's daytime series Coffee Break was the host from that city. The second season originated from St. John's.
