= Catherine Swing =

Canadian television personality

- Occupations: actress, television personality
- Title: Miss Canada 1978
- Spouse: Fergie Olver (divorced)

Catherine Swing is a Canadian television personality, actor, producer, director and former Miss Canada.

Swing won the Miss Canada pageant in 1978, after having won the Miss Toronto crown while she was a student at York University. Over the next year she made public appearances in different parts of the country. She talked with the challenges of being Miss Canada with the press, most notably the lack of control over her own schedule. Swing was not able to compete in the 1978 Miss Universe pageant as she had what the papers called "marriage plans".

In 1980, she created Just Like Mom, a television game show which ran on CTV until 1985; from the second season onwards she co-hosted the show with her then-husband Fergie Olver. In 2009 a new version of the show was announced and Swing served as a consultant. After Just Like Mom concluded, Swing continued to work in television as an actor and director.

== Filmography ==
Year	Title	Role
1988	Diamonds	Unknown
1986–1988	Night Heat	Roz / Toni Shire
1990	Katts and Dog	Unknown
1989	Food of the Gods II	Colour Commentator
1989	Street Legal	Interviewer #1
1992	Forever Knight	Janice Hedges
1992	Teamster Boss: The Jackie Presser Story	Secretary
1994	RoboCop	Martina Marx
1995	Darkman II: The Return of Durant	Bonnie Cisco
1997	Bad Day on the Block	Crack House Reporter
1997	Due South	Shelley Byron
1996–1998	The Outer Limits	Reporter #2 / Nurse
1999	Total Recall 2070	Rekall Salesperson

Preceded by Yvonne Foster	Miss Canada; 1978	Succeeded by Heidi Quiring
