= A Way Out (TV series) =

Canadian DIY television show

A Way Out is a Canadian do-it-yourself television show on CBC Television which originally began as a gardening show, but, evolved to include crafts, outdoor activities and do-it-yourself home repairs and improvements. The show was hosted by George Finstad (1970-1974) then Mary Chapman and Laurie Jennings and produced by Doug Lower (1970-1971), Neil Andrews (1971-1974) and Robert Hutt (1974-1976).

The program actually began on April 9, 1967 as "Gardening" and was also known as "Gardening with Stan." Earl Cox was one the original hosts, assisted by Harry Mannis. The program was 15 minutes and bumped around the Sunday afternoon schedule between 12:45 and 4:15 pm. The title was changed to "A Way Out" in 1970.

== Television schedule history ==
- Sunday 1:15-1:30 p.m., 7 June 1970 – 19 September 1971
- Sunday 12:45-1:00 p.m., 26 September 1971-
- Monday 4:30-5:00 p.m., 1 April-2 September 1974
- Sunday 12:45-1:00 p.m., 8 September 1974 – 28 September 1975
- Sunday 12:45-1:00 p.m., 5 October 1975 – 31 March 1976
- Sunday 12:15-12:30 p.m., 4 April-
- Sunday 12:15-12:30 p.m., 19 September 1976 – 25 September 1977
