= Music to See (1970 TV program) =

- Genre: Music performance
- Presented by: Barbara Smith (1978–1979)
- Country of origin: Canada
- Original language: English
- No. of seasons: 9

Production
- Executive producer: John Barnes
- Producers: Stuart Cuppage; John Coulson
- Running time: 30 minutes

Original release
- Network: CBC Television
- Release: 5 July 1970 – 25 March 1979

Music to See is a Canadian music television program that aired on CBC Television from 1970 to 1979.

== Premise ==
This classically-oriented music program featured recitals recorded in various cities across Canada. The series featured both new and established musicians, with a broad range of styles presented.

== Scheduling ==
This half-hour series was broadcast on Sunday afternoons throughout the 1970s as follows:

| Time | Season run | Note |
|---|---|---|
| 5:00 p.m. | 5 July to 26 December 1970 | |
| 2:30 p.m. | 28 February to 11 April 1971 | rebroadcasts |
| 5:00 p.m. | 11 July to 26 December 1971 | |
| 5:00 p.m. | 16 July 1972 to 25 March 1973 | |
| 5:00 p.m. | 8 September 1974 to 14 September 1975 | |
| 4:00 p.m. | 28 January to 21 March 1976 | |
| 4:00 p.m. | 12 December 1976 to 2 January 1977 | |
| 1:00 p.m. | 18 September 1977 to 23 July 1978 | |
| 1:00 p.m. | 1 October 1978 to 25 March 1979 | |
| 3:00 p.m. | 29 April to 12 August 1979 | rebroadcasts |
