= Write On (TV series) =

Canadian educational television series

Write On was an educational television show which was produced and broadcast by TVOntario.

The series starred Jack Creley as Mr. R.H. Morton, Diane Dewey as Miss Newton, and Paul Brown as Henry Kent.

The premise of the series is of the misadventures of the staff of a small newspaper under the editorship of the tyrannical Morton with his subordinates, Miss Newton the secretary and Henry Kent, a young reporter. Considering Kent has poor writing and grammatical skills for a professional journalist, the staff have numerous events that illustrate various lessons about writing. Furthermore, Kent often have equally educational daydreams (much like Walter Mitty) where he is a dashing hero illustrating various writing concepts.

Every episode of Write On was five minutes in length. They were written by Ken MacKay and Jed MacKay.

Philip Nixon was Producer/Director. Ilona Herzberg, Production Assistant and Brian Elston, Editor.
