= Thrill of a Lifetime (TV series) =

- Created by: Sidney M. Cohen
- Starring: Doug Paulson, Teri Austin
- Country of origin: Canada

Production
- Producers: Barrie Diehl, Tracy Cohen
- Running time: 22 minutes

Original release
- Network: CTV
- Release: November 2, 1981 – April 10, 1987

Thrill of a Lifetime is a television reality series (before that term was coined) created by Sidney M. Cohen (who also directed many of the episodes) and Willie Stein. It was telecast from 1981 to 1988 in Canada on the CTV network. Thrill of a Lifetime gave viewers the chance to live their dreams, with thrills ranging from daredevil adventures to the romantic. The program was hosted by Doug Paulson, with Teri Austin joining as co-host later in its run. One of the program's more notable episodes was in its first season, when it arranged for an aspiring model named Shannon Tweed to pose for Playboy, which led to her becoming 1982's Playmate of the Year and launching an acting career.

Thrill of a Lifetime was revived in 2002 with new episodes produced and telecast in Canada and other countries.

== Episodes ==
The original run of Thrill of a Lifetime ran for six seasons.

=== Season 1 ===
Episode	Original air date	Summary
1-01	November 2, 1981	An actress rides a killer whale as it performs before a crowd of 2,000; a Victoria man recreates a flight on a B-25 bomber; a Montreal man meets Miss Canada 1981, Dominique Dufour.
1-02	November 9, 1981	A nine-year-old Little Leaguer pitches to Montreal Expos catcher Gary Carter; a model (Shannon Tweed) auditions for Playboy; an insurance agent confronts wrestling's "Masked Destroyer".
1-03	November 16, 1981	A man washes windows on the CN Tower, then climbs to the top; a railroad worker becomes rich for a day; a woman takes over as host of The Alan Thicke Show; a man puts his pet, Queenie, through her paces.
1-04	November 23, 1981	An eleven-year-old boy appears in a guest role on The Littlest Hobo; newlyweds ride a biplane; a car owner "takes revenge" on her automobile; a songwriter has one of her songs performed on national television.
1-05	November 30, 1981	A man plays the first black James Bond (including driving one of the original Bond cars); a 65-year-old couple travel to the Arctic; a fourteen-year-old girl takes a beachcombing trip in B.C.; after ten years as pen pals, a Canadian and British correspondent meet for the first time.
1-06	December 21, 1981	A limo chauffeur drives a racing car; a woman gets a "make-over" and is featured in Homemakers magazine; a man sings with one of his favourite stars; a girl in a wheelchair rides in a hot air balloon with country music star Carroll Baker.
1-07	January 4, 1982	A construction worker crowns "Mr. Thrill of a Lifetime" in an all-male beauty pageant; a professor and best-selling author takes on 13-year-old tennis star Carling Bassett at a tennis academy in Sarasota, Florida; a teenager is reunited with her father.
1-08	January 18, 1982	An ordinary person makes an emergency landing in a jet liner; two brothers are reunited; a participant makes a country singing debut.
1-09	January 25, 1982	A 15-year-old amateur boxer spars with Commonwealth and Canadian heavyweight champion Trevor Berbick; a computer operator rescues a damsel in distress; a boy learns magic from two magicians.
1-10	February 15, 1982	A woman skates with Toller Cranston on the set of Stars on Ice; a man goes over the rapids of Hell's Gate; a couple are married in a traditional Oriental setting.
1-11	March 15, 1982	An 80-year-old pianist-composer, Cliff Carter records his first album, Mr. Nostalgia; a grocery clerk tries bull-riding; an eighth-grader teaches a classroom of teachers.
1-12	March 22, 1982	A twelve-year-old skates pairs with Canadian Figure Skating champion Tracy Wainman; a 17-year-old Scarborough high school student performs in concert with rock group Triumph; a Montreal librarian becomes a comic strip star.
1-13	April 5, 1982	A seven-year-old skates with Montreal Canadiens star Guy Lafleur; a woman becomes a plus-size model; a pastor tries motorcycle ice racing.
1-14	April 12, 1982	A woman makes her comedy debut with comedian Marty Allen; a man goes helicopter skiing; a man joins forces with Chuck Norris.
1-15	April 19, 1982	A seven-year-old Manitoba youngster battling a serious illness becomes "The Baby Trucker"; a Toronto firefighter shoots pool with Minnesota Fats; a Nova Scotian woman is reunited with her mother, whom she has not seen for twenty years.
1-16	May 3, 1982	A marketing executive swims with dolphins in a marine aquarium; an Edmonton baker plays oil baron; an aspiring ballerina gets her chance to dance.
1-17	May 10, 1982	A taxi dispatcher plays disc jockey on an FM radio station; a prison inmate plays saxophone before a studio audience; a waitress is permitted to wear $1 million in diamonds.
1-18	Unknown	An Ottawa woman receives a pass from Wayne Gretzky and scores her first goal; an advertising executive participates in a western cattle round-up; 12-year-old girl sings the national anthem at an Ottawa hockey game.

=== Season 2 ===
Episode	Original air date	Summary
2-01	September 2, 1982	A 10-year-old girl dances "The Nutcracker" with ballerina Veronica Tennant; a teenager plays tuba with the Canadian Brass; a baker runs an oil company for a day; an executive swims with dolphins.
2-02	September 20, 1982	A Thunder Bay firefighter fires the cannons on HMCS Haida for the Toronto Symphony Orchestra's performance of the 1812 Overture; a follow-up with Playmate of the Year, Shannon Tweed; a school teacher gives host Doug Paulson an anniversary surprise.
2-03	September 16, 1982	A Calgary sales representative plays with the Montreal Expos; two teenage girls are serenaded by their favorite singing group, The Nylons; a married couple goes on a wild rollercoaster ride through a mountain of shaving cream; pen pals who have been writing to each other for more than 60 years meet.
2-04	October 4, 1982	A pizza baker joins the RCMP Musical Ride; a high school student plays Shakespeare opposite Len Cariou at Stratford, Ontario; an Ottawa civil servant demolishes a 14-storey apartment building; a 9-year-old boy imitates his idol, Elvis Presley.
2-05	October 11, 1982	A student plays stuntman and falls from a three-storey building; a waitress pilots a blimp; a girl rides a circus elephant.
2-06	October 18, 1982	A Quebec postal worker attempts to qualify for his professional drag-racing license; a couple honeymoon in Niagara Falls; an 11-year-old hockey goalie receives a complete set of official equipment; an aspiring singer from the Prairies makes her debut performing Slow Hand.
2-07	October 25, 1982	A 12-year-old Alberta boy takes command of HMCS Athabaskan; an explosive technician learns falconry and gives an outdoor performance; a woman overcomes her fear of heights by jumping 2,000 feet with skydiving champion Kathy Cox; a Nova Scotian woman plays bagpipes with the Toronto Police Pipe Band.
2-08	November 8, 1982	A father of two goes one-on-one against New York Islanders' Mike Bossy; a 12-year-old girl from Calgary plays a duet with Liona Boyd; a B.C. woman proclaims her love for her husband on national television.
2-09	November 15, 1982	An 11-year-old boy captains his classmates in a football game against the Saskatchewan Roughriders; a husband and wife stay at an exclusive hotel and cruise on a private yacht on their "millionaire's holiday"; an accountant goes fishing with angler Red Fisher.
2-10	November 22, 1982	An 87-year-old woman helicopters to a remote ice field in B.C. that she and her husband first discovered 50 years earlier; a woman substitutes for John Byner on Bizarre; a 12-year-old boy plays soccer with the Montreal Manic; four sisters are reunited after twenty-four years apart.
2-11	November 29, 1982	An airline employee is home-plate umpire at a Pearson Cup game between the Expos and the Blue Jays; a teen-ager rides The Black Stallion; two sisters mud wrestle; an English man travels to Canada to surprise his twin sister, whom he has not seen in over 25 years.
2-12	January 10, 1983	A Manitoba couple goes deep-sea fishing off the Mexican coast; a Vancouver university student dances a pas de deux with national ballet dancer Frank Augustyn; a deaf girl receives a hearing dog; a Saskatchewan grandmother rides a 1942 Harley Davidson motorcycle.
2-13	January 17, 1983	A baton twirler (Tanya Swinimer) from Dartmouth, Nova Scotia, marches in the Grey Cup Parade; an 18-year-old body builder from Golden, B.C. works out with Mr. Universe, Roy Callender; a Moose Jaw homemaker sings at Gilley's country and western night in Pasadena, Texas; best friends are reunited after a lengthy separation.
2-14	January 24, 1983	A homemaker rides a Great Lakes freighter as it is launched; an Alberta illusionist performs at Hollywood's Magic Castle; two high school students ride to school in a helicopter.
2-15	January 31, 1983	A young businesswoman selects the second annual "Mr. Thrill of a Lifetime"; a university student flies with the Ray-Ban Reds; after a 22-year separation, a woman is reunited with the aunt who raised her.
2-16	February 7, 1983	A 12-year-old boy flies in a Lockheed CP-140 Aurora, a Canadian Forces maritime patrol and anti-submarine warfare aircraft; a Nova Scotia school girl performs with her favourite singers; a woman joins the Toronto Argonauts' cheerleading squad.
2-17	February 14, 1983	A girl spends her birthday on The Dukes of Hazzard set; a forest ranger pilots the Canada 1, Canada's entry in the America's Cup yacht race; a B.C. couple get married.
2-18	February 21, 1983	A high school student plays basketball with Julius Erving; an Ontario family attends a gala film festival opening for a film starring their late grandfather; an executive secretary travels in Canadian Forces submarine HMCS Ojibwa; Saskatchewan grandparents jitterbug.
2-19	February 28, 1983	A Thunder Bay student visits the Playboy Mansion; a 16-year-old girl pilots the Bluenose II in a parade of tall ships; a Victoria man sings on stage to his mother.
2-20	March 7, 1983	A Calgary homemaker sings in concert with Toronto; a 12-year-old boy "pilots" a NASA Space Shuttle simulator; a teenage girl rides with Olympic equestrian, Mark Laskin; a Montreal housewife is reunited with Quincy star Robert Ito, who was once her dance partner.
2-21	March 21, 1983	A delivery driver participates in a demolition derby, a 19-year-old Dave Foley performs comedy at The Improv in Los Angeles; a secretary learns to scuba dive in Mexico; a B.C. grandmother meets her African foster-child after 20 years.
2-22	March 28, 1983	An Ontario secretary coaches her hometown hockey team, the Peterborough Petes; a logger plays rodeo clown; a Winnipeg woman works with penguins; a pair of nine-year-olds are reunited.

=== Season 3 ===
Episode	Original air date	Summary
3-01	September 19, 1983	A boy participates in military exercises at Canadian Forces Base Wainwright; a 15-year-old girl works as an investigative reporter for Canada AM; twin sisters have a food fight.
3-02	September 26, 1983	A woman plays wide receiver with the Hamilton Tiger-Cats; a 15-year-old girl dresses up as Barney Rubble at Canada's Wonderland; an amateur painter visits Robert Bateman's studio.
3-03	October 3, 1983	A man brews his own beer at a major brewery; a woman rides a dirt bike before a crowd at Exhibition Stadium in Toronto.
3-04	October 10, 1983	A man learns how to crash a car like a stunt driver; a teenager acts out her favorite television commercial; a woman operates a streetcar 40 years after having been a streetcar driver 40 years earlier.
3-05	October 17, 1983	A man takes rides a buffalo; a woman models for the Sears catalog; an amateur violin maker hears his creation played by Stéphane Grappelli.
3-06	October 24, 1983	A musical impersonator appears onstage with Johnny Cash; a girl goes on a date with a robot; a table tennis player plays against the Chinese National Table Tennis team; a Winnipeg teenager hears his own composition played by Andre Gagnon and they play a duet.
3-07	October 31, 1983	A writer plays one of her characters; a woman plays in a horror scene; a girl plays a duet with Frank Mills; a woman is made into a vampire by a professional makeup artist.
3-08	November 14, 1983	A high school soccer team plays with the Toronto Blizzard; a calypso music fan plays with The Merrymen; a grandmother goes to the Annapolis Valley Apple Blossom Festival.
3-09	December 19, 1983	A man flies in a jet fighter; a housewife meets fitness star Ed Allen; a 10-year-old Mark Edwardson Jr. makes a movie mentored by an Oscar-winning filmmaker Eugene Fedorenko.
3-10	December 26, 1983	A 9-year-old girl trains with gymnast Elfi Schlegel; two mothers dance in a casino revue chorus line; a couple drives a team of Carlsberg draft horses.
3-11	January 9, 1984	A telephone lineman climbs a 100-foot pole in an exhibition against lumberjacks; a man celebrates his 100th birthday riding in a Rolls-Royce; a woman is serenaded by Chris de Burgh; a woman is reunited with five generations of her family for a family portrait.
3-12	January 16, 1984	A woman rides a bronc bareback at the Calgary Stampede; a bus mechanic works in the pits at Mosport during a championship race; a man from the Prairies goes fishing on the Atlantic; a woman has tea with comedian Anna Russell.
3-13	January 30, 1984	A history buff recreates 19th-century military life at Old Fort Henry in Kingston, Ontario; a man climbs a sheer rockface; a woman performs with the National Tap Dance Company; two 11-year-old girls visit Government House, the official residence of British Columbia's Lieutenant Governor.
3-14	February 20, 1984	A participant travels aboard the Concorde; a fan meets David Cronenberg; a boy goes to the bottom of the Atlantic in a submersible.
3-15	February 27, 1984	A steelworker takes the helm of a restored steamboat in the Muskoka region of Ontario; a woman visits Tom Jones backstage in Atlantic City; a pack of Cub Scouts performs a Grand Howl.
3-16	March 12, 1984	A 12-year-old girl sings the national anthem before a crowd of 40,000 at a Montreal Expos game; a student models in the Creeds Winter Fashion Show; a backhoe operator operates the world's largest earth-mover; a homemaker meets a lifelong friend whom she has not seen in 40 years.
3-17	March 19, 1984	A 13-year-old girl skates with Canadian champion and Olympic silver-medalist Brian Orser; twin brothers participate in air-sea rescue maneuvers aboard a Canadian Forces helicopter; Qu'Appelle, Saskatchewan becomes the provincial capital for a day.
3-18	March 26, 1984	An amateur chef prepares dinner for celebrities; a high school flautist plays with Paul Horn; a photographer shoots press photos of celebrities; a father and daughter are reunited after a 35-year separation.
3-19	April 2, 1984	Two senior citizens are in Dino Bravo's corner for a wrestling match; a man proposes to his girlfriend in an unusual way; a man plays harmonica with the Downchild Blues Band; a woman participates on the floor of the Toronto Stock Exchange.
3-20	April 9, 1984	A 12-year-old boy spends a day training at the RCMP Academy, Depot Division; a woman shows her designs to Oscar de la Renta; a young couple eat breakfast in Halifax, lunch in Toronto, and supper in Vancouver.
3-21	April 16, 1984	A team of boys takes on the Vancouver Canucks in a game of street hockey; a blackjack player serves as croupier in an Atlantic City casino; a woman goes hang gliding over Lake Ontario.

=== Season 4 ===
Episode	Original air date	Summary
4-01	October 13, 1984	A teenage girl joins the Winnipeg Jets in a softball game against the Calgary Flames; a working mother appears in Flare magazine with the help of Vidal Sassoon; three grandmothers join the circus.
4-02	October 27, 1984	A boys' basketball team competes against the Harlem Globetrotters; a businessman prepares sushi; a couple visit the Northwest Territories where they build and sleep in an igloo.
4-03	November 17, 1984	An executive helps complete the construction of a new skyscraper; a teenager meets World Figure Skating Champions Martini and Underhill; a young cartoonist meets Mad Magazine cartoonist Sergio Aragones.
4-04	November 24, 1984	A 14-year-old swimmer races Alex Baumann; a woman competes in her first horse race; an art teacher meets Ella Fitzgerald; an English grandmother meets her Canadian granddaughter for the first time.
4-05	December 8, 1984	A 12-year-old speed skater races Olympic champion Gaetan Boucher; a harness racing fan calls a feature race; a waiter performs with the Temptations at Toronto's Ontario Place.
4-06	December 15, 1984	A 15-year-old boy rides in a speedboat with Robert Theoret; a music teacher accompanies photographer Freeman Patterson on a field expedition; a man participates in a Brazilian festival in Montreal and is rewarded with a trip to the carnival in Rio de Janeiro.
4-07	December 29, 1984	A skier causes an avalanche in the cause of safety; a son sings a song he wrote for his father while he was recovering from an accident; a French chef cooks for an oil rig crew; and a bowling fan is reunited with someone at a provincial tournament.
4-08	January 14, 1985	A group travels to Nashville to meet a number of country music acts, including The Oakridge Boys, Minnie Pearl, Roy Acuff, Loretta Lynn, and Gary Morris.
4-09	January 28, 1985	A skier joins champion Todd Brooker on a downhill course; a girl plays a part in a Platinum Blonde video; an animal lover mothers a baby monkey.
4-10	February 18, 1985	A man rides in a giant four-wheel drive truck as it crushes a row of cars at Toronto's Exhibition Stadium; a highschool teacher competes in a trapshooting match against Susan Nattrass; a man joins the crew of a water bomber on a practice flight.
4-11	February 25, 1985	An architect helms a tall ship; a 13-year-old boy teams up with fiddler Lee Cremo; a young man gets tips from Rummy Bishop on the way to an appearance onSnow Job.
4-12	March 4, 1985	A 102-year-old man visits St. Catharines, Ontario, where worked on the construction of the Welland Canal; a teacher races Olympic silver-medalist Curt Harnett at Montreal's Olympic Velodrome.
4-13	March 18, 1985	A 15-year-old boy participates in a Toronto Blue Jays pre-game warm-up; a family of amateur ventriloquists performs with Shari Lewis and Lambchop; a firefighter learns the latest techniques.
4-14	March 25, 1985	A student and his friends challenge the Canadian rowing team (Olympic gold medal winners at the Los Angeles games); two men settle a bet involving a Porsche.
4-15	Unknown	A curling fan skips Ed Werenich's rink for a day; an 18-year-old girl dances in a Toronto night club.
4-16	Unknown	A water-skier is towed by a ferry; an Air Force veteran conducts the Air Command Band in concert; a 12-year-old presents the news.
4-17	Unknown	A septuagenarian minister flies over his parish in a World War II Tiger Moth biplane; a rockhound travels to an Arctic mine; and a man, after 40 years of marriage, has some songs he wrote for his wife published.

=== Season 5 ===
Episode	Original air date	Summary
5-01	October 3, 1985	A grade 9 student spends a day at the Toronto Argonauts' training facility; a man helps assembly-line workers build his own car; a middle-aged mother swings from the Hotel Vancouver's chandelier.
5-02	October 10, 1985	A 12-year-old boy travels by helicopter to surprise his father on an east coast oil rig; a university student learns the trapeze; a darts buff plays one of the best in the world.
5-03	October 17, 1985	A businessman tours Walt Disney World with Mickey Mouse; a housekeeper spends a day with Charley Pride; Mark Edwardson, whose previous thrill was animating a cartoon drawing, returns to animate a television commercial.
5-04	October 24, 1985	A teacher plays Santa Claus at Toronto's Eaton Centre; a trumpet player performs with the Canadian Brass; a retired teacher meets one of her former sixth-graders, Karen Tilley, Miss Canada 1985.
5-05	October 31, 1985	Thrill seekers participate in aerial siding, speedboat racing, and canoe racing on the St. Lawrence River in Quebec City in February.
5-06	November 7, 1985	A receptionist observes sharks in their habitat in The Bahamas; a civil servant explores the Blue Holes; a mechanic helps build an undersea structure.
5-07	November 14, 1985	A highschool student meets her idol, soap opera star Michael Damian from The Young and the Restless.
5-08	November 21, 1985	A 13-year-old girl dives with Olympic gold-medalist Sylvie Bernier; a mother becomes a police constable for a day; a farmer meets accordion player Frank Yankovic at a Ukrainian New Year's party.
5-09	November 28, 1985	A peewee hockey team plays the Quebec Nordiques; a businessman plays squash with Sharif Khan; a teenager raps with The Fat Boys.
5-10	December 5, 1985	A man windsurfs in The Bahamas with an Olympic champion; a young mother dances the can-can with a professional troupe; a young man bobsleds with the Canadian national team near Lake Placid, N.Y.
5-11	February 20, 1986	A fan tap dances with Maurice Hines; a man bounces on top of BC Place's inflatable roof; a school teacher water skis at Cypress Gardens, Florida.
5-12	February 27, 1986	An engineer performs 25,000 feet in the air; a waiter has his cartoon published; a girl becomes a princess at a beauty pageant.
5-13	March 6, 1986	A man captains his own ship; a high school student dangles from a helicopter over the Rocky Mountains; a fan joins Honeymoon Suite in concert.
5-14	March 13, 1986	A fan plays with Canada's water polo team; a bank teller becomes a cowgirl for a day; a businessman rides in the sky.
5-15	March 20, 1986	A telephone repairman goes whitewater rafting; a fan joins the Famous People Players on stage; a mother steps into the fashion world.
5-16	March 27, 1986	A crown prosecutor becomes a model for a day; a student plays tennis with Jimmy Arias.
5-17	April 3, 1986	An amateur jams with Elvin Jones; a music fan becomes a disc jockey; a horse enthusiast joins the Canadian equestrian team.
5-18	April 10, 1986	A dentist plays a million-dollar organ; a farm girl goes to Marineland of Canada in Niagara Falls, Ontario; a teenage bodybuilder meets Mr. Universe.
5-19	April 17, 1986	A juggler steps into the spotlight at Circus World.
5-20	April 9, 1986	A 12-year-old boy spends a day training at the RCMP Academy, Depot Division; a woman shows her designs to Oscar de la Renta; a young couple eat breakfast in Halifax, lunch in Toronto, and supper in Vancouver.
5-21	Unknown	A truck driver switches to funny cars; a fan jams with a blues legend; a gardener rides in a horse race.

=== Season 6 ===
Episode	Original air date	Summary
6-01	October 10, 1986	A designer of the first Greyhound bus meets some old friends; a husband and wife sail on Canada's entry in the America's Cup; a woman makes and eats Turtles chocolates; army friends are reunited after 40 years.
6-02	November 21, 1986	A thrill-seeker plays with Canada's World Cup Team; a fan meets Loretta Lynn; a bus operator drives a chuckwagon; friends are reunited after 28 years.
6-03	December 5, 1986	A man cleans the ice for the Montreal Canadiens; a teenage girl skis with Laurie Graham; a 78-year-old fiddler plays with a champion; a brother and sister are reunited after 40 years.
6-04	December 12, 1986	A 5-year-old boy goes on a date with Keshia Knight Pulliam of The Cosby Show; a man learns some tablecloth magic; a woman receives a dressage lesson from Canadian champion Cindy Ishoy.
6-05	January 9, 1987	A woman cooks with Ruth Fremes of What's Cooking; a man competes in a tractor-pull competition; a grandmother works with elephants; a brother and sister are reunited after 80 years.
6-06	January 16, 1987	A student becomes a hotel manager; a girl presents an award at the CASBYs; a man receives the guitar of his dreams.
6-07	January 23, 1987	A music lover plays guitar with Domenic Troiano; a girl dances with prima ballerina Evelyn Hart; a man is reunited with his foster parents.
6-08	January 30, 1987	A student appears on The Campbells; a data processor works at Toronto's Molson Indy; a grandmother releases balloons at a circus.
6-09	February 13, 1987	A dentist learns photography from Yousef Karsh; a girl kayaks with 1984 Olympic gold-medalist Alwyn Morris; a teenager plays with wild animals.
6-10	February 20, 1987	A 12-year-old navy cadet runs an army obstacle course; a student races a Nova Scotian dory; a grandmother travels by helicopter to a tea party.
6-11	February 27, 1987	A theatre lover performs with William Hurt; a highschool teacher rides a tank; a grandmother roller skates with a Canadian champion; sisters-in-law are reunited after 40 years.
6-12	March 6, 1987	A Canadian Forces mechanic drives a Lamborghini; a woman appears in a bridal magazine; a girl plays hockey with the Winnipeg Jets.
6-13	March 13, 1987	A man records his favorite song; two women throw things off a six-storey building; an 8-year-old boy becomes an executive for a day; pen pals are united after 30 years.
6-14	March 27, 1987	Two young boys meet Toronto Maple Leaf hockey star Wendel Clark; a woman plays in a military marching band; a man flies in a restored W.W.II B-25 Mitchell bomber.
6-15	April 3, 1987	A woman works on CTV's Live It Up!; a woman rides a railway handcar; a teenage boy becomes a chef in the military; two friends are reunited after 25 years.
6-16	April 10, 1987	A fan meets Ben Johnson; a retiree dances with a Canadian champion ballroom dancer; a homemaker wears jewelry worth millions; sisters are reunited after 21 years.
6-17	Unknown	A woman commands an army parade: a man junks a car; a 100-year-old woman is reunited with her niece after 60 years.
6-18	Unknown	A woman sings with Ronnie Hawkins; a married couple coach a CFL team; two sisters are reunited after 20 years.
6-19	Unknown	A student goes over the edge of the CN Tower; a man steers a lifeboat; a teacher goes to a Montreal gala; a boy is reunited with his pet.
6-20	Unknown	A B.C. man joins the Canadian Coast Guard for a search-and-rescue mission; an executive secretary produces, directs and stars in her own music video; a New Brunswick man is reunited with his two sons, whom he has not seen in 30 years.
6-21	Unknown	A man wears knight's armor; Cats Can Fly play at the prom of a small graduation class; a brother and sister are reunited after 64 years' separation.
