= Music to See (1957 TV program) =

- Genre: Music education
- Presented by: Helmut Blume
- Country of origin: Canada
- Original language: English
- No. of seasons: 1
- No. of episodes: 8

Production
- Producer: Ted Pope
- Running time: 30 minutes

Original release
- Network: CBC Television
- Release: 3 September – 29 October 1957

Music to See is a Canadian music educational television program that aired on CBC Television in 1957.

== Premise ==
Helmut Blume presented this televised course on aspects of music such as electronic music, how opera is associated with drama and the conductor's role.

== Awards and recognition ==
Ohio University presented Music to See with an award for educational broadcasting.

== Scheduling ==
This half-hour series was broadcast Tuesdays at 10:30 p.m. (Eastern) from 3 September to 29 October 1957.
