= Porthole Cruise Magazine =

Porthole Cruise and Travel Magazine
- Editor: Bill Panoff
- Categories: Travel
- Frequency: Bimonthly
- Publisher: Bill Panoff
- Founded: 1993
- Company: PPI Group
- Country: United States
- Based in: Florida
- Language: English
- Website: porthole.com
- ISSN: 1070-9479
- OCLC: 28520907

Porthole Cruise and Travel Magazine is a bi-monthly, internationally distributed periodical dedicated to cruise ship travel, holiday cruise destinations, and cruise ship experiences.

== History and profile ==
It was founded in 1993 by publisher and editor-in-chief Bill Panoff, CEO of Ft. Lauderdale-based PPI Group as a trade magazine, but changed format to a consumer magazine in 1996.

Since 1998, the magazine has issued Reader's Choice Awards, surveying its readers to recognize outstanding cruise lines, ships, destination, itineraries, ports of call, onboard amenities, and shoreside hotels, shopping and excursions.

In 2013, Porthole's parent company, PPI Group, became the media partner of the annual Cruise Shipping Miami industry conference.
