= List of English-language Canadian game shows =

The following is a list of English-language game shows that air or have aired in Canada.

== 0–9 ==
- 5-4-3-2-Run (1988–1990)

== A ==
- Acting Crazy (1991-1994)
- All About Faces (1971–1972)
- Anything You Can Do (1971–1974)
- Are You Smarter than a Canadian 5th Grader? (2007)

== B ==
- Beat the Clock (1970–1974)
- Because News (2015–present)
- Beyond Reason (1977–1980)
- Bluff (1976–1977)
- Bowling for Dollars (1960–2008)
- Brain Battle (2007–2008)
- Bumper Stumpers (1987–1990)

== C ==
- Cache Craze (2013–2014)
- Canada's Handyman Challenge (2012–2014)
- Cash Cab (2008–2015)
- Chain Reaction (1986–1991)
- Clips (1993–1996)
- Cooking for Love (2000)
- Communicate (1966–1967)
- Crossword Quiz (1952–1953)

== D ==
- Deal or No Deal Canada (2007)
- Definition (1974–1989)
- Designer Superstar Challenge (2003–2006)
- Detective Quiz (1952)
- Double Up (1974)

== E ==
- Eye Bet (1971)

== F ==
- Fighting Words (1952–1962, 1970, 1982)
- Flashback (1962–1968)
- Food For Thought (1989-1993)
- Fort Boyard (1993–2001)
- Front Page Challenge (1957–1995)
- Family Feud Canada (2019–present)

== G ==
- Game Gurus (2007–2008)
- Game On (1998–2000)
- Generation Gap (1989)
- Go (2002–2010)
- Guess What (1983–1987)
- Gutterball Alley (2001-2002)

== H ==
- Handyman Superstar Challenge (2006–2010)
- Headline Hunters (1972–1983)

== I ==
- Ice Cold Cash (2012)
- If You Crave Chocolate Too (1987–?)
- Inside the Box (2006–2008)
- Instant Cash (2011–present)
- It's Your Move (1964–1967, 1974–1979)

== J ==
- Jackpot (1985–1988)
- Japanizi: Going, Going, Gong! (2013–2014)
- The Joke's on Us (1983–1984)
- Just for Fun (1975–1976)
- Just Like Mom (1980–1985)
- Just Like Mom and Dad (2018-2019)

== K ==
- Kidstreet (1988–1992)
- A Kin to Win (1961–1964)

== L ==
- The Last Word (1989–1990)
- Let's Make a Deal (1980–1981)
- Lingo (1987–1988)
- Live a Borrowed Life (1959–1962)
- Love Handles (1996–1998)
- Love Me, Love Me Not (1986–1987)

== M ==
- The Mad Dash (1978–1981)
- Make a Match (1954–1955)
- Massive Monster Mayhem (2017–2018)
- Match Game (2012–present)
- The Moneymakers (1969)
- Mr. and Mrs. (1963–1966)

== N ==
- The New Liar's Club (1988–1989)
- The New Quiz Kids (1978–1979)
- The Next Line (1991)

== P ==
- Party Game (1970–1981)
- Pay Cards! (1973–1975)
- Pitfall (1981–1982)
- Puppet People (1973–1975)
- Pop Whiz (2022-present)

== Q ==
- Qubit (2009–2010)

== R ==
- Reach for the Top (1961–1985)

== S ==
- Second Honeymoon (1987–1988)
- Showdown (1961–1962)
- SmartAsk (2001–2004)
- Spin Off (2013)
- Split Second (1986–1987)
- Strategy (1969)
- Super Pay Cards! (1981–1982)
- The Superior Sex (1961)
- Supermarket Sweep (1992–1995)
- Superstar Hair Challenge (2007–present)
- Supertown Challenge (1998–2000)
- Surprise! It's Edible Incredible! (2004–2009, 2011)

== T ==
- Take a Chance (1961–1965)
- Take Your Choice (1960–1971)
- Talk About (1988–1990)
- Test Pattern (1989–1991)
- This Is the Law (1971–1976)
- TimeChase (1997–1999)
- TimeShift Trivia (2008)
- To Tell the Truth (1962–1964)
- Twenty Questions (1961–1962)

== U ==
- Uh Oh! (1997–2003)
- University Challenge (1970–1971)

== V ==
- Video & Arcade Top 10 (1991–2006)

== W ==
- What on Earth? (1971–1975)
- What's the Good Word? (1972–1976)
- Who Knows? (1959)
- Who Wants to Be a Millionaire: Canadian Edition (2000)
- Wild Guess (1988-1990)
- Words and Music (1966–1967)

== Y ==
- You Bet Your Ass (2005–2007)

== Z ==
- Zoink'd (2012–2013)

== See also ==
- List of French-language Canadian game shows
- List of American game shows
- List of British game shows
- List of Australian game shows
- Game show
- List of international game shows
- List of television programs
- UKGameshows.com (a British website devoted to reviews and descriptions of game shows)
- Game Show Network (an American television channel devoted to game shows)
- GameTV (a Canadian television channel devoted to game shows)
- Challenge (a British television channel devoted to game shows)
- Nickelodeon GAS (a defunct television channel devoted to airing Nickelodeon game shows)
