= Lists of game shows =

This is a lists of game shows.

== By nationality ==
- List of American game shows
- List of Australian game shows
- List of British game shows
- List of English-language Canadian game shows
- List of French-language Canadian game shows
- List of international game shows

== See also ==
- List of television game show franchises
