= Pip Wedge =

British-Canadian television executive and producer (1928–2026)

- Born: Philip Lomas Wedge; 2 December 1928; Forest Hill, London, England
- Died: 15 April 2026 (aged 97); Toronto, Ontario, Canada
- Occupations: Television executive, producer
- Years active: 1950–2023
- Spouse: Lis Kingdom (m. 1965)
- Children: 1
- Awards: Canadian Broadcast Hall of Fame (2006)

Philip Lomas Wedge (2 December 1928 – 15 April 2026) was a British-Canadian television executive and producer who served as Vice-President, Programming, of Canada's CTV Television Network from 1973 to 1993. He was inducted into the Canadian Association of Broadcasters Broadcast Hall of Fame in 2006.

== Early life ==
Wedge was born in Forest Hill, London on 2 December 1928, the son of a clerical family who named him Philip so that he could be called "Pip" in homage to the protagonist of Charles Dickens's Great Expectations. After completing his secondary education during the Second World War, he took a job as a clerk and switchboard operator at a London advertising agency in May 1946, then served in the Royal Navy as a telegraphist, a posting that included monitoring radio traffic from a vessel near Glasgow harbour during which he became a regular listener to the American Forces Network.

== Career ==
=== United Kingdom: music journalism and Associated-Rediffusion ===
Wedge entered journalism through the British musician and broadcaster Steve Race, who recruited him to the music weekly New Musical Express (then Musical Express). He began contributing concert reviews in June 1950 and rose to reporter and assistant editor by June 1952. He also worked as business manager for Race and as publicity manager for Philips Records.

In 1955, six months before Associated-Rediffusion launched as the first Independent Television contractor in the United Kingdom, Wedge joined the company to set up its music department. He ran the department for two years before moving into light entertainment production, where he produced game shows including Double Your Money and Take Your Pick! and held positions as Assistant Head and then Acting Head of Light Entertainment, as well as Manager of Children's Programmes. He left Associated-Rediffusion in 1962 to work as a freelance producer and writer.

=== Canada: CTV Television Network ===
Wedge first travelled to Canada in 1964 to produce a Canadian adaptation of Double Your Money for the CTV Television Network, with editions of the show recorded at seven CTV affiliate stations across the country during the 1964–65 season. The assignment led CTV to offer him a permanent position, and he emigrated to Montreal in August 1965 to take up the role of Executive Producer there. Among the series, he oversaw in Montreal were the variety programmes B.A. Musical Showcase and Words and Music and the panel game It's Your Move; he also wrote and produced the network special Expo's Almost Here, a curtain-raiser for Expo 67, and was associate producer on ten editions of the public-affairs programme W5 that were recorded at the world's fair.

He was transferred to Toronto in August 1967, was appointed Promotion Manager in September 1968, and added the title of Director of Development in 1970, working closely with CTV president Murray Chercover on Canadian–American co-productions and establishing the network's first international programme-sales operation. In May 1973, when Chercover restructured CTV's senior programming team, Wedge was appointed Vice-President, Programming, with responsibility for the acquisition of all U.S. series carried by the network and for the integration of the national schedule with affiliates' locally acquired programmes. Wedge was also responsible for buying U.S. studio series for CTV at the annual Los Angeles Screenings, including Rowan & Martin's Laugh-In, Soap, and The Love Boat.

Wedge retired from CTV in December 1993, leaving the network in June 1994 after thirty months of transition; he was succeeded as senior programming executive by Paul Robertson. After his retirement he undertook consultancy work for CTV, the Canadian Association of Broadcasters (CAB), and the Canadian Cable Television Association.

== Personal life and death ==
Wedge married Elisabeth "Lis" Kingdom in 1965, with whom he had a son.

Wedge died in Toronto on 15 April 2026, at the age of 97.

== Honours ==
Wedge was inducted into the Canadian Association of Broadcasters Broadcast Hall of Fame in November 2006, alongside fellow inductees including Vicki Gabereau and H. Frank Lewis.
