= Just 4 Fun =

Just 4 Fun may refer to:

- Just 4 Fun (band), a Norwegian band, active in the early 1990s
- Just 4 Fun (TV program), an Australian children's show, on air from 1976 to 1978
- "Just 4 Fun", a 2025 song by Lizzo from the mixtape My Face Hurts from Smiling

== See also ==
- Just for Fun (disambiguation)
- 4Fun, a Lithuanian band, active since 2001
- 4 Fun, a Dutch boy band, active from 1997 to 1998
