= Just for Fun =

Just for Fun may refer to:

- Just for Fun (Timeflies album), a 2015 album by American pop duo Timeflies
- Just for Fun (Hank Jones album), a 1977 jazz album
- Just for Fun (book), the 2001 autobiography of Linux kernel creator Linus Torvalds.
- Just for Fun (film), a 1963 British musical
- Just for Fun (EP), a 1963 split EP by Bobby Vee and The Crickets
- Just for Fun (Canadian TV series), a Canadian children's game show, on air from 1975 to 1976
- "Just for Fun", a Beyoncé and Willie Jones song from her 2024 album Cowboy Carter
- a series of craft and activity books based on historical American Girl characters

== See also ==
- Just 4 Fun (disambiguation)
