= House Party (Canadian talk show) =

Canadian talk show television series

- Genre: Talk show
- Presented by: Michele Tisseyre
- Country of origin: Canada
- Original language: English
- No. of seasons: 1

Production
- Running time: 30 minutes

Original release
- Network: CBC Television
- Release: 26 October 1954 – 5 February 1955

House Party is a Canadian talk show that aired on CBC Television from 1954 to 1955.

== Premise ==
Michele Tisseyre interviewed guests who were mostly entertainers or sportspeople. Each guest was introduced with a narrated film or photograph montage.

== Scheduling ==
This half-hour series aired on alternate Tuesdays at 10:30 p.m. (Eastern) from 26 October 1954 to 5 February 1955. What's My Line was broadcast on the other Tuesdays until December, after which House Party alternated with Make a Match.
