= Canada's Worst Driver Ever =

- No. of episodes: 8

Release
- Original network: Discovery Channel
- Original release: October 28 – December 16, 2013

Season chronology
- ← Previous; Canada's Worst Driver 8 Next → Canada's Worst Driver 10

Canada's Worst Driver Ever is the ninth season of the Canadian reality TV show Canada's Worst Driver, which aired on the Discovery Channel. As with previous years, eight people, nominated by their family or friends, enter the Driver Rehabilitation Centre to improve their driving skills. This season brought back nine former contestants, who were either named Canada's Worst Driver or failed to graduate in the final episode of their respective seasons, giving them one more chance to improve their driving and avoid being named Canada's Worst Driver Ever. This year, the Driver Rehabilitation Centre is located at the now-defunct Dunnville Airport in Dunnville, Ontario for the fourth straight season. The initial drive started in Thorold, Ontario and the final road test occurred in Hamilton, Ontario.

== Experts ==
- Cam Woolley is the show's longest-serving expert, having been present in every season except the first and has seen the habits of Canadian drivers change drastically since 2000, with the most common offense having changed from DUI to distracted driving over the previous decade. He is the traffic expert on CP24 in Toronto and had a 25-year career as a traffic sergeant with the Ontario Provincial Police. As the longest-serving expert on the panel, Cam is already familiar with every returning driver - except Chris.
- Philippe Letourneau is a veteran high-speed driving instructor who counts BMW and Ferrari among his clients. Since joining the show in the third season, the average car has gained considerably in speed and acceleration, with the high-speed emphasis of this season making his job a particularly important one. As the second-longest-serving expert on the panel behind Cam, Philippe is already familiar with every returning driver - except Chris, Henrietta and Michael.
- Shyamala Kiru is the show's resident psychotherapist and relationship expert, a position which has become more demanding each year since joining the show in the seventh season, as the stresses in driving and everyday life seem to always be on the increase. As the second-shortest-serving expert on the panel behind Tim, the only returning drivers Shyamala is already familiar with are Kevin, Shirley and Sly. With Shyamala returning for her third season, that ties her with Dr. Louisa Gembora, the psychologist from seasons three-five of Canada's Worst Driver, as the longest-serving psychologist so far.
- Tim Danter is in his second season as the show's head driving instructor. In this position, he not only gives the drivers help and instructions for challenges, but gives them further lessons off-screen. As the shortest-serving expert on the panel, the only returning driver Tim is already familiar with is Kevin. With Tim returning for his second season, that officially makes Dan Bagyan, the head instructor from the fourth season, the shortest-serving head instructor in Canada's Worst Driver history.

== Contestants ==
This season saw nine former contestants returning from previous seasons. However, it also has the fewest graduates so far with only four. Six of them returned with their original nominators and two (Dale and, initially, Michael) joined with new nominators, while Chris returned without a nominator with him. The only season to see no contestants returning is Canada's Worst Driver 4.

- Shelby D'Souza, 37 and licensed for 11 years, from Calgary, Alberta, was nominally the runner-up in the third season, though, in a way, was the "worst driver" from that season since the actual worst, Jason Zhang, immediately gave up driving for good following his terrible road test performance in Barrie that included stopping while merging onto Ontario Highway 400. Shelby and his brother, Elerick, feel that regardless of the outcome, he is now a much better driver. He drives a black Chevrolet Avalanche and drove a black Mitsubishi Outlander to the rehab centre.
- Christopher "Chris" Ferguson, 40 years old and licensed for 21 years from Malton, Ontario, was the first-ever person to be given the title of the worst in the first season due to a terrible road test performance in Montreal despite a strong start. In the eight years since, he believes that he has hugely improved as a driver, having much better luck this time around. His wife, Michelle, was his nominator, but she did not accompany him during his second appearance on the show. He drives a black Mazda 5 and drove a white Pontiac G6 to the rehab centre.
- Henrietta Gallant, 68 years old and licensed for 42 years from Summerside, Prince Edward Island, was judged the worst in the second season due to a terrible, incomplete road test performance in Toronto and refusing to admit fault for her mistakes. While her husband, Andy, acknowledges that she has at least learned to take responsibility for her errors in the seven years since, both of them believe that it may be too late for her to learn what she needs to understand (at 68, Henrietta is also the show's oldest-ever contestant). She drives a gray Chevrolet Impala.
- Sly Grosjean, 42 and licensed for 19 years, from Red Deer, Alberta (moved to Edmonton, Alberta), was the runner-up in the seventh season thanks to a decent road test performance, despite a terrible overall track record in the competition. His brother-in-law, Fred Hillyer, disagrees with the experts, believing that Sly avoided being named the worst through luck (an opinion Andrew himself shared during that season's finale), explaining Sly's continued use of handheld electronic gadgets while driving as proof that he learned nothing from his original appearance. He drives a silver Jeep Patriot and drove a purple Pontiac Montana SV6 to the rehab centre.
- Angelina Marcantognini, 30, from Sudbury, Ontario, was judged the worst in the fifth season after a horrific overall performance, which saw her fail all but one challenge during that season (the Reverse Flick was the only challenge she passed with Andrew's help) and, like Henrietta Gallant in the second season, fail to complete the road test. (This results in Andrew informally judgeing her to be the show's worst-ever driver in the Canada's Worst Driver: U Asked! special prior to the start of the previous season.) Angelina is determined to prove Andrew wrong; however, her best friend, Christine Latondress Andrews, has seen little to no improvement whatsoever in the years since, worried she'll just prove him right. She drives a black Chevrolet Malibu.
- Dale Pitton, 65, from St. Catharines, Ontario, was the runner-up in the sixth season, thanks to finishing the road test in Niagara Falls. Her refusal to listen to the experts' recommendation that she quit driving caused tension between Dale and her original nominator/nephew, John, subsequently forcing her to call on another nephew, Danny, to accompany her to rehab this time around. She drives a blue Chevrolet Cavalier.
- Shirley Sampson, 62 and licensed for 47 years, from Donkin, Nova Scotia, performed reasonably well for most of the seventh season, only to be named the worst after a disastrous road test performance in Hamilton that included stopping while merging onto and merging off the Chedoke Expressway. In the two years since, she has continued to improve her driving; she and her daughter, Janis Wall, are both determined to prove that she had a bad day when she was named the worst. She drives a blue Toyota Matrix and drove an orange Chevrolet Cobalt to the rehab centre.
- Kevin Simmons, 26, from Burnaby, British Columbia (near Vancouver), after being named the joint-worst (with Flora Wang) in the previous season, has been brought straight back to rehab by his boyfriend, Lenny Stone. Since the previous season, Kevin has already been involved in another serious accident, and Lenny is starting to believe that Kevin should follow Jason Zhang's lead from the third season by giving up driving for good (something Kevin said was "stupid" during his original appearance). He drives a white Ford Crown Victoria and drove a blue Chevrolet Malibu to the rehab centre.
- Michael Telford, 47 and licensed for 31 years, from Vancouver Island, was the runner-up in the second season, performing reasonably well for most of the season, except during the road test, in which (despite committing the fewest moving violations, six in total) he took just over three hours to complete. His longtime friend, Yolanda Goodwin (the wife of his original nominator, Eric, originally unable to return for health reasons), believes that Michael's driving has degraded significantly compared to than his first appearance; she believes he will get involved in a fatal accident unless he returns to rehab. (However, after learning that Yolanda was constantly giving negative feedback, the producers decided to send her home and bring back Eric, who had since recovered.) Michael drives a green Lincoln Continental and drove a black Chevrolet HHR to the rehab centre.

== Synopsis ==
Contestant	1	2	3	4	5	6	7	8
Kevin Simmons	IN	IN	IN	IN	IN	IN	IN	CWDE
Dale Pitton	IN	IN	IN	IN	IN	IN	LEFT	RUNNER-UP
Sly Grosjean	IN	IN	IN	IN	IN	IN	IN	2ND RUNNER-UP
Michael Telford	IN	IN	IN	NOM	IN	IN	IN	OUT
Shelby D'Souza	IN	IN	IN	IN	IN	OUT		
Angelina Marcantognini	IN	IN	IN	PSYCH				
Shirley Sampson	IN	OUT						
Chris Ferguson	OUT							
Henrietta Gallant	DISQ							

The contestant became Canada's Worst Driver Ever.
The contestant was runner-up for Canada's Worst Driver Ever.
The contestant was on the panel's shortlist.
The contestant left the show without permission, sustained an injury, and were unable to continue in the competition.
The contestant graduated.
The contestant was sent from the Driver Rehabilitation Centre to a psychological clinic and is out of the running for Canada's Worst Driver Ever.
The contestant was deemed ineligible to take part in the show and sent home.
The contestant's nominator was changed during the show.
The contestant was not the worst driver or even the runner-up, but failed to graduate from rehab.
^1 Non-Elimination Week, due to all contestants wanting to remain at the Driver Rehabilitation Centre.
^2 Non-Elimination Week, due to all contestants failing The Longest Reversing Challenge Ever.
^3 Although Dale was expelled from the Driver Rehabilitation Centre, she was brought back for the trophy presentation because the experts believed she could have been named Canada's Worst Driver Ever, even though she didn't participate in the final challenges.

== Episodes ==
No.	Title	Original release date
0	"Remember..."	October 21, 2013
Andrew introduces each of the returning drivers through a review of their performances during the final road test in their original appearances. At the end of the episode, he briefly outlines the challenges that they will face and restates his personal belief that Angelina is Canada's Worst Driver Ever, though says that he is willing to be proven wrong.
1	"They're Back!"	October 28, 2013
The Drive to Rehab: This season, the journey to the Driver Rehabilitation Centre starts from Thorold Auto Parts and Recycling in Thorold, Ontario, with the nine returning drivers heading back to rehab using a provided set of instructions, a journey that Andrew notes is an hour-long drive. The contestants depart in the following order: Michael, Dale, Shelby, Henrietta, Sly, Kevin, Shirley and Chris (who volunteers to drive Angelina to rehab, as she was too hung over from spending the previous night drinking heavily).; Except for Chris and Henrietta, everyone makes a large number of moving violations on the way to rehab; the contestants arrive in the following order: Shelby, who, in stark contrast to his slow driving from Canada's Worst Driver 3, actually broke the speed limit more than once), Michael, who ran a stop sign only minutes into his drive and continued to demonstrate his habit of holding his breath in tunnels; Dale who kept stopping at green lights, then hit the barrier when parking up; Henrietta, who drove 100 km (62 mi), the longest drive in years; Sly, who failed to understand what a stop sign was, consequently resulting in him failing to stop at two stop signs; Shirley, who nearly drove into the occupied intersection of Thorold Road and South Pelham Road, having to be stopped from doing so by Janis; Kevin, who failed to compensate for his limited vision and nearly collided with a truck, and; Chris, who had to stop so Angelina could get out and vomit.; Results: First to Arrive: Shelby was the third to leave, but the first to arrive.; Last to Arrive: Chris was the last.; Camaro Challenge - Basic Assessment: After revealing that this year's recurring challenge car will be a Camaro SS (painted in a flag-inspired livery, similar to the 2009 Dodge Challenger RT used in the seventh season and had to be buried at the end of that season), Andrew walks through the basic assessment that each driver will undertake. The challenge itself is basically the same as the previous season, albeit with the first two sections flipped around; firstly reversing through a course of wheel rims, followed by a U-turn in a section of concrete barriers and finally a slalom between foam people at 50 km/h.; Angelina is first up, knocking over a set of wheel rims before Andrew can even finish his introductory speech. (Despite Christine's best efforts to guide her, Angelina knocks over nearly every set of wheel rims, damages the Camaro in the U-turn, and then gets her wedge shoes get stuck on the accelerator in the slalom, causing her to drive at an inconsistent speed and strike the foam figures.); Dale's run is near-identical to Angelina's, as she never uses her mirrors in the reverse segment, causes even more damage to the car's bodywork in the U-turn, and goes under-speed in the slalom.; Kevin neglects to use his mirrors in the reverse section (which takes him over 20 minutes to complete), nearly tears off the Camaro's front bumper in the U-turn and then goes completely off the course during the slalom.; Henrietta has improved performance in the first two segments (albeit with extensive coaching from both Andrew and Andy), but goes under-speed in the slalom, hitting several of the foam figures.; Chris, who has Andrew in the passenger seat, has by far the best run of the day, not knocking down a single wheel rim and only experiencing a very low-speed collision in the U-turn; he ends up executing the slalom flawlessly.; Sly is over-cautious in the reverse section - he completes it while only knocking a few rims down, but takes more than half an hour to do. However, in the U-turn section, he rips off the Camaro's rear bumper, then drives with only one hand on the wheel in the slalom, going far too wide and completely missing the required turns.; Michael shows improved performance in the reverse section (only hitting three rims), but then damages the car in the U-turn, before trying to take the slalom at 80 km/h and violently spinning off-course.; Shelby is the slowest performer of the day, taking over 40 minutes to complete the reversing course (though he hits fewer rims than many of the other drivers). He is unable to complete the U-turn, so he allowed to bypass to the slalom, where his repeated under-steering causes him to fail.; Shirley initially struggles in the reversing course due to trouble aligning herself correctly. She is then able to execute the U-turn flawlessly; however, she under-steers on the slalom and fails. (She is still the only driver besides Chris to successfully complete any of the segments.); Results: Best Performer: Chris and Shirley were the only two people who passed at least one segment of this challenge, but Chris showed better performance.; Worst Performer: Kevin went off course during the slalom and not using his mirrors.; The drivers then have their initial meeting with the experts.; Michael asks Philippe to go over the footage of his slalom spin-out with him; Philippe tells Michael that his mistake was driving too fast and not looking where he wanted to go, instead directly staring at the foam people.; Sly is also reprimanded for making the same mistake in his run.; Henrietta admits that, since Andy retired shortly after Canada's Worst Driver 2 aired, he usually drives the couple everywhere, and that she doesn't usually drive more than a dozen times per year.; Shelby thinks he might be "Canada's Worst Driver Ever." Andrew tells him that he probably isn't that bad, but that he could still benefit from more rehab. (Shelby also expresses shock that Angelina really is as bad as her reputation suggests.); The remaining drivers all deny that they may be Canada's Worst Driver Ever.; Due to the disappointing performances by most of the drivers, the experts agree to graduate one person immediately so as to give the remainder their full attention and very quickly decide on Chris. However, Cam raises the issue that Henrietta would not realistically benefit from rehab, since she drives so rarely and that they would be better served sending her home, graduating Chris, and then focusing on the remaining seven. Ultimately, Andrew gives Henrietta her license back, after which Andy drives her away. Andrew then further surprises the drivers by announcing that Chris, clearly the most skilled of the group, goes from being the first-ever worst driver to the first graduate. Note: This episode did not display an opening title screen or broadcast the opening animation.
2	"Where's Your Blind Spot?"	November 4, 2013
Running the Rails: This challenge, previously run in Canada's Worst Driver 6, places the drivers at the wheel of a RAV4 and requires them to approach a short track made up of two rails, drive onto it and follow the rails to the end and then reverse off it. The drivers have only one chance and falling off and being unable to continue will result in an immediate fail.; Michael is the first to take the challenge, though Yolanda is unable to accompany him (as she has a congenital hip defect, which has been exacerbated by her being involved in car crashes). Michael completes the forward part without much difficulty, but he then goes too close to the end of the track, then drives off after accidentally putting the RAV4 in first gear instead of reverse.; Dale (who failed this challenge three years earlier when she didn't get aligned), doesn't manage to get fully on the track before failing off. Kevin, despite Lenny's coaching, only gets halfway up the track and falls off after accidentally steering into the side of the track he was about to fall off of.; Angelina refuses Christine's advice to adjust her mirrors; she is, therefore, unaware of where her wheels are, taking six attempts to get onto the rails and then falling off immediately. She is then able to back out and retry; however, she falls off halfway.; Despite Janis' constant worry, Shirley executes the challenge flawlessly.; Shelby does well on the forward section, but his failure to adjust his mirrors (Elerick deliberately neglecting to tell him to do so) causes him to fall off halfway through reversing.; Sly constantly attempts to solicit Fred's advice in the challenge, but Fred refuses. Sly eventually gets to the end, but is inches from falling off. (When Fred gets out of the car, Sly falls off.); Results: Best Performer: Shirley, as she had the only pass in the challenge.; Worst Performer: Dale, who fell off the rails and got stuck almost immediately. (Angelina also failed to get the car on the rails, but was able to make additional attempts before becoming stuck, unlike Dale.); Road Signs: Tim tests the seven drivers on their road sign knowledge, a test which it's noted all the drivers have previously been through. Of the ten signs tested, Shirley got 8/10, which was both the highest score overall and the biggest improvement over the original appearance of any driver, considering she only got 1/10 two years earlier due to outdated knowledge. Sly, Shelby, Kevin and Michael all get at least half right, though their exact scores are not revealed. Dale and Angelina post the joint-lowest scores, with only 2/10.; Crazy Eights: This test, previously run in Canada's Worst Driver 6, pits two drivers at a time against each other in a pair of Suzuki Sidekicks driving in a figure-eight course of wheel rims, with a combination of S-turns and accurate reversing required to get through the course.; Shelby and Shirley make up the first heat - although Shirley needs Andrew to refresh her memory on how to perform an S-turn, both get through the course flawlessly.; Dale (who drove over a rim and punctured the Honda CR-X del Sol's gas line three years earlier when she competed against then-head instructor Peter Mellor after Scott Schurink was expelled) and Michael are the second heat - while Michael makes it through with minimal issue, Dale hits 19 objects and fails. The Suzuki Sidekicks are then swapped out for two Pontiac Fieros.; Kevin and Angelina make up the third heat - Kevin continues to demonstrate his problem of only ever looking forward and rarely turning his head, which causes him to run over several wheel rims and fail. Similarly, Angelina has a poor run, backing completely off the course and into a field.; Sly takes the last run alone due to the lack of another driver; he is extremely slow, taking 97 minutes to get through the course.; Results: Best Performer: Michael and Shelby, who both completed the challenge flawlessly without needing any advice. (Shirley also passed, though needed a little help from Andrew at first.); Worst Performer: Even though Sly took 97 minutes to get through the course, Angelina was deemed the worst for leaving the track altogether during her run.; Camaro Challenge - The Shoulder Check Challenge: In one of the show's most frequent challenges, the drivers each have to approach a split lane at 70 km/h, and then check left and right over their shoulder to see which lane (designated by a green marker) they must turn into. Each driver has two runs.; Angelina is first-up; she drives at 100 km/h, crashing straight through the central barrier, splitting the Camaro's front bumper in half and damaging its radiator on the first run. After the Camaro is repaired, Angelina takes another attempt, but understeers and clips the barrier.; Kevin understeers on his first turn, also clipping the barrier; on his second run, he steers too early and hits the lane markers; however, as he and Andrew note, the result is an improvement on the previous year, when he tried to cheat.; Shelby gets the challenge exactly right on the first go, as does Shirley.; On his first run, Sly drives through the lane markers, due to him turning his whole body rather than just his head. He then hits the lane marker again on his second run by steering too soon.; On his first run, Michael drives too slowly (at just 60 km/h) and slows down further toward the end of the straight. On his second go, Michael passes with ease.; Dale gets technique right on her first go, but inexplicably turns into the lane she's told not to turn into. On her second go, she only checks over one shoulder and clips the central barrier.; Results: Best Performer: Shelby and Shirley, as they both passed on their first attempt.; Worst Performer: Angelina, who failed both her runs and damaged the Camaro severely, resulting in the challenge being paused.; Angelina has a lengthy discussion with the judges and admits that she is no longer on anti-depressants due to her original psychiatrist having retired and being unable to find another in Sudbury. Shyamala tells Angelina that while she can't prescribe drugs, she can help her deal with her issues, and Angelina agrees to as many therapy sessions as it'll take. Along with Angelina, Sly, Dale and Kevin all admit that there's no way they'll be graduating this episode, as they didn't pass any challenge. This leaves Michael, Shelby and Shirley (who each had some degree of success in each challenge this episode) as the pool of potential graduates. Despite all three wanting to graduate, the judges decide that there is no need whatsoever for a discussion. Shirley, who was regarded as the most capable driver of the group (apart from Chris) before rehab (and the only driver who fully passed all challenges this episode), becomes the next graduate, with Andrew describing her as "inspirational." Note: This episode did not display an opening title screen or broadcast the opening animation.
3	"Splish-Splash!"	November 11, 2013
Limo Figure-Eight Challenge: For the second time in as many episodes, the drivers are required to reverse around a figure-eight course. This time, however, they are given the much harder task of reversing an 8 m (26 ft) long Lincoln Town Car limousine around the course. The driver and their nominator will sit in the driver's compartment and the other five drivers will sit in the passenger section, while the other nominators will watch from outside.; Angelina volunteers to go first, while also declining to make a serious effort, which resulted in a total of 36 object impacts on the course. Confusing the exercise to be the Distracted Driving Challenge, she answers a phone call from her boyfriend, Andy. (Angelina's action draws criticism from Michael, an assessment agreed with by Sly.); Michael only uses his passenger-side mirror, knocking over five objects in the opening turn; after being reminded to use all the mirrors on the car, he quickly corrects himself and doesn't hit any other objects.; Kevin has to be coached extensively by Lenny during his run, but he quickly starts to use his mirrors extensively; he posts the best run on this challenge, hitting only two objects.; Dale gets extensively advised by Andrew, Danny, and Michael during her run; however, she is still unable to apply their advice, making 22 object impacts.; Despite his success in the previous episode, Shelby neglects to adequately use his mirrors and doesn't consider the limo's front-end swing; despite finishing with the fastest time, he impacts 16 objects, causing Andrew to tell him that reversing is a point of concern.; Sly continues to demonstrate a severe lack of spatial awareness on top of his slow reversing speed, resulting in everybody leaving the challenge area and leaving Sly to complete the course alone. (Sly ultimately impacts 24 objects and takes over ten minutes longer than anyone else to complete the challenge, a performance Andrew brands arguably even worse than Angelina's.); Results: Fastest Performer: Shelby performed the fastest at 16:46.; Slowest Performer: Angelina performed the slowest at 33:15.; Best Performer: Kevin, who had impact on two objects during his run. (This was the result Lenny extensively coaching him.); Worst Performer: Even though Angelina made impact on 36 objects and took a phone call from her boyfriend, Sly was so slow that everyone except for Andrew and the camera crew walked out.; Camaro Challenge - Swerve and Avoid: In what Andrew points out is one of the most critical skills taught on the show, the drivers must avoid a foam car which will appear in one of two lanes, by swerving into the free lane. Each driver has two turns and must carry out the manoeuvre at 70 km/h. This year, the timing to successfully execute the challenge is so tight that Andrew almost fails his demonstration, entering the correct lane with just inches to spare.; Kevin hits the brake, partly going through the central barrier and then into the adjoining field. He makes the same mistake again on his second run.; Shelby makes the same mistake on his initial run (and also drives too fast, at 100 km/h); he correctly executes the manoeuvre and passes on his section attempt.; Dale, who has to be reminded by Danny to take the course at 70 km/h instead of 70 mph, chooses a lane before the car even appears during her first run, resulting in her turning into its lane and front ending it. On her second run, she appears to pass the challenge. (Upon further inspection, it turns out that she turned before the car was visible, meaning that she failed.); Since Sly's run two years ago, he's told to carry out his first run at just 40 km/h, but not told that no car will appear. Much to the disbelief of Andrew, Fred, and the experts, Sly doesn't brake or turn into a lane, smashing through the central barrier. On his second, full-speed run, Sly drives at 90 km/h, turning before the car even appears, crashing into it, a result that leaves Andrew and Fred convinced that Sly is incompetent to drive.; As a result of his spin-out on the Basic Assessment Challenge, Yolanda refuses to accompany Michael in the high-speed challenges; Andrew takes her place. Yolanda's concerns are proven true as Michael continues to demonstrate the target fixation that caused that spin-out, crashing directly into the car on his first run. On his second run, he clips the central barrier again, much to Michael's frustration.; Angelina shows up to the challenge hungover. On her first run, she drifts to one side and fails to react when the car appears, crashing through the central barrier. She drifts to one side on her second run, hitting lane markers, then successfully gets into the right lane, albeit while striking lane markers and then driving into the field. (Angelina and Christine try to claim that Angelina herself passed the challenge; Andrew subsequently criticizes Christine for not making a serious effort to get Angelina to improve.); Results: Best Performer: Shelby, who was the only driver to pass.; Worst Performer: Sly, for showing a total lack of common sense by driving straight through the central barrier on his "fake run." (Of the drivers who had two actual runs, Angelina and Kevin both did the worst, by spinning off-track on at least one attempt.); The Water-Tank Challenge: For this, one of the show's most notoriously tricky challenges, the drivers each have to drive at 40 km/h through an obstacle course with a 100 litres (26 US gal) tank of water mounted on the car's roof. The car used is a Ford Taurus wagon, painted in a water-inspired livery. Any sharp acceleration or braking will result in the water draining from the tank onto the driver and their nominator.; As usual, even Andrew doesn't avoid a soaking, losing only 16 litres (4.2 US gal) of water in all (he deliberately accelerates and stops sharply at the end as well).; Sly's acceleration and braking are erratic throughout the challenge, resulting in him losing 65 litres (17 US gal).; Dale loses 55 litres (15 US gal) by not properly using her mirrors.; Michael keeps driving too at excessive speeds, but still has the best run in this challenge, losing 50 litres (13 US gal) (making him the only driver other than Andrew to keep at least half the water in the tank).; Kevin doesn't take the challenge seriously and keeps braking sharply, resulting in him losing 80 litres (21 US gal).; Shelby knocks over a foam person in his run, then backs over it; the impact of hitting the ground on the other side of the person fractures the tank, resulting in all 100 litres (26 US gal) draining into the driver's compartment.; Angelina doesn't participate in the challenge, instead getting a private therapy session from Shyamala. (Despite the concerns of the experts that she shouldn't be in rehab, Angelina is able to talk Shyamala out of expelling her, and it's agreed that she may continue on the show for now.); Result: Best Performer: Michael kept half the water in the tank, more than anyone else.; Worst Performer: Shelby lost all of his water after a freak accident; of the other drivers, Kevin did the worst, losing the most water and not making a real effort.; The experts tell Dale that she actually failed her second run on the Swerve and Avoid; Dale admits she truly believed she saw the foam car, which Shyamala feels could be a sign of a more serious overall problem. None of the drivers want to graduate, but the experts decide to draw up a shortlist anyway. Despite it being noted that Michael and Kevin did well in the Limo Figure-Eight Challenge (and Michael also had the best run in the Water-Tank Challenge), Cam persuades the others that the Swerve and Avoid is an important skill, claiming that those who failed the challenge should automatically be barred from graduating this episode, which makes Shelby the only nominee by default as he was the only one to pass the challenge. In the end, Andrew tells Shelby that he has been the best performer until now and that the experts could have seen a case for him graduating this episode. However, Shelby declines, leading to none of the contestants graduating. Note: This episode did not display an opening title screen or broadcast the opening animation.
4	"Easy as 1-2-3"	November 18, 2013
Three-Point Turn: This challenge, being run in its Canada's Worst Driver 6 incarnation, requires the drivers to drive a Suzuki Sidekick along a thin road onto a small island, which is surrounded by a moat, turn the car around in no more than three steps and drive back out. Any driver who gets stuck in the moat will immediately fail.; Sly is the first to take the challenge, albeit unable to apply Andrew's advice to think of his route as a triangle and quickly backing into the moat. This, combined with him not thinking to put the car in four-wheel drive, causes him to fail.; A similar incident happens on Angelina's run, as she backs into the moat, resulting in her becoming frustrated at both the car and Christine (causing the experts to question her ability to continue on the show).; Michael takes his run without anyone else in the car Despite this, he nearly gets it right on his first run, which ends up being a five-point turn; on his second run, he successfully carries out the turn.; Dale (who got the Jeep TJ stuck in the moat three years earlier) fails to get onto the island, driving into the moat within starting the challenge (getting stuck even when Michael left the car in four-wheel drive, which Dale confuses with front-end swing when Andrew tries to tell her what it does).; Shelby fails his run for the same reason.; Kevin has the best performance on the challenge, getting a three-point turn on his first go, followed by the congratulations of both Lenny and Andrew.; Results: Best Performer: Kevin was the only driver who passed on his first attempt. Michael also passed, but needed two attempts after his first resulted in a five-point turn.; Worst Performer: Dale and Shelby, who both got stuck almost immediately.; The Trailer Challenge: For this year's incarnation of the test, the drivers each have to drive a Ford F-250 pickup towing a caravan through a course of cars and wheel rims, before reversing the caravan into a parking space.; Sly is the first to take the challenge, knocking over several rims during the first part of the course. His run subsequently ends up being halted after he attempts to exit the truck to check his position while the truck and caravan are still moving.; Dale is constantly reminded by Andrew to do wide turns to compensate for the narrower turns the caravan will take, but fails to apply his advice and causes severe damage during the forward section. (The instance where she parked up the caravan is not shown, but the damage results in a fail.); Shelby tears a hole in the caravan's body during the forward section, resulting in his run being halted immediately.; Michael, accompanied by Andrew in his run, gets through the forward section without hitting a single thing. However, he overthinks the reversing section (seen especially the second season, in which he was the worst), eventually giving up after being unable to get the caravan in the parking spot.; Kevin continues his run of good challenges, with no hits in either direction and becoming the only driver to pass this challenge.; The final driver is Angelina, causing numerous dents and scrapes to the caravan in the forward section before becoming frustrated again in the reversing section; she ultimately gives up after nearly striking Andrew.; Results: Best Performer: Kevin, who had the only pass in the challenge.; Worst Performer: Shelby, who committed a dangerous mistake that immediately halted his run; Camaro Challenge - The Eye of the Needle: In this, one of the few challenges that has been done since the beginning of the series, the drivers are given two chances to navigate a series of five arches at 80 km/h. During his demonstration, Andrew notes that the most common failing in this challenge is the result of drivers placing themselves in the middle of the arches, subjecting their passengers to impact.; During his first run, Shelby drives at 100 km/h, striking all but one arch; on his second run, he's allowed to drop his speed to 50 km/h, but immediately strikes the first arch, causing both Shelby and Andrew to wonder whether Shelby himself would receive the title be Canada's Worst Driver Ever.; Angelina, hungover for the second time, insists on wearing heels for the challenge; after striking the first arch, she drives off-course, stopping halfway down the track.; Despite Andrew's dire predictions, Dale passes her first challenge of the season; she skidded on the second arch, but was ultimately able to regain control of the car, maintain her speed, and get through the rest of the course safely.; In his first run, Sly strikes the first arch, subsequently locking up the brakes and crashing through the second arch before coming to a stop, then totaling the Camaro's passenger-side wing mirror on the third arch. (Andrew brands this as the worst Eye of the Needle run in the entire history of the show.) Sly is forced to wait for the show's mechanics to fit a replacement mirror for his second run, but immediately demolishes it again on the first arch, causing him to fail.; Kevin is unable to continue his run of strong challenges, striking three of the five arches on his first run; despite taking his second run at a reduced speed of 60 km/h, he strikes every arch and then wrecks the third passenger side mirror of the day.; Michael, accompanied by Andrew, drops his speed to 60 km/h for the second and third arches, going back full speed for the fourth and fifth arches, which Andrew decides is proficient enough to be deemed a pass. (However, Yolanda criticizes Andrew with the belief that Michael should have failed by failing to maintain 80 km/h throughout the run.); With a set of flat shoes provided by the show, Angelina takes her second run; however, she closes her eyes, then ends up wrecking every arch. As Andrew drives her and Christine, an emotional Angelina discusses her personal struggles and lack of medical support, leading Andrew to conclude that the Driver Rehabilitation Centre is not equipped to address her underlying issues.; Results: Best Performer: Michael, who passed the challenge with minimal issue. Dale also passed, but locked up the Camaro's wheels and skidded uncontrollably for a good portion of the challenge.; Worst Performer: Angelina, who destroyed the entire course.; After the challenge ends, Shyamala takes Angelina aside, with the message that her time on the show is over. Angelina is then told that she has been booked a 60-day stay at a specialist psychiatric clinic - ultimately accepting the offer after an initial rejection - due to the strong implication that she will be expelled from rehab if she refuses the treatment, which would have made her the third contestant to be expelled from rehab (after Colin Sheppard in the second season and Scott Schurink in the sixth season) and the second by the experts. However, Angelina's departure is not the only issue facing the judges - Yolanda's excessive negativity expectations are proving detrimental to Michael's learning. Andrew tells Michael that Eric's health has sufficiently improved for him to take over from Yolanda as nominator, while Yolanda's has been failing due to pulled muscles sustained in the first episode; Michael tells the judges that while he'd be grateful to have Eric around again, he also thinks that allowing him to graduate this episode would resolve two issues at once. Kevin is the only other driver who shows any desire to graduate, though he quickly retracts his request, saying that he'd benefit more from staying in rehab (a decision Kevin would later regret, as he would eventually end up in the finale); the remaining drivers all admit they don't deserve to graduate. Ultimately, the experts decide to deny Michael's request to graduate and all five remain in rehab. Andrew closes out the episode by saying that Angelina isn't really Canada's Worst Driver Ever and that her problems go far beyond a simple lack of skill at the wheel. (Before the credits, the show listed details of support available for those suffering depression and other mental health issues.) Note: This episode did not display an opening title screen or broadcast the opening animation.
5	"They Shoot! They Score!"	November 25, 2013
The Trough: As in nearly every incarnation of this classic challenge, the objective is to drive a RAV4 through a course made up of overturned concrete Jersey barriers, with wide turns again being paramount to success. If a driver gets stuck, they will have to restart the course, though in an attempt to discourage the drivers from being overly hasty, they each have a set number of four attempts rather than a half-hour period in which to get through the challenge. Prior to the challenge, Kevin sends a letter to Andrew and the experts, apologizing for his conduct in the previous season (especially referring to the notion of giving up his license as being "stupid") and vowing to start taking responsibility for his driving.; On his first attempt, Kevin fails to adjust his mirrors prior to his first run and consequently falls off quickly; on his second run, he improperly adjusts the mirrors; on his third run, he adjusts his mirrors properly, but neglects to use them; and on his fourth & final run, he manages to travel halfway down the track, but falls off, failing.; During a discussion with Shyamala prior to his run, Sly reveals that the likely cause for his appalling spatial awareness is a head injury he sustained as a teenager. Despite both Andrew and Fred's concerns during the run (in no small part due to Sly severely damaging the RAV4 he used for the challenge in the seventh season) and him failing the first two runs by neglecting to adjust the mirrors, Sly passes the challenge on his third attempt, attributing success to luck.; Michael (with Eric, after Yolanda was sent home) is the third driver in a row to fail his first run for neglecting adjusting the mirrors, eventually passing on his third attempt.; Dale has the worst performance on this challenge by failing at 1/3rds of the course.; Shelby has the best run, as he remembers to adjust his mirrors, immediately realizes his mistake when he falls off during his first attempt and passes with ease on the second go.; Results: Best Performer: Shelby, who completed the challenge faster than anyone else.; Worst Performer: Dale, who never got very far up the trough and needed Danny to tell her whenever she'd gotten stuck.; Car Hockey: In a variation of a challenge previously run in the fifth season, the drivers each have to push an oversized hockey puck (as opposed to the shopping cart used previously) from a red line down a short track using a Honda Prelude and shoot the "puck" at a goal while remembering to stop the car before a blue line.; None of the drivers score a single goal on any of their attempts: Kevin only gets one puck all the way down the track and sends it wide; Dale goes so slow that her pucks never reach the goal; Shelby fails to get any of his pucks down the track; Michael only gets one puck to the scoring area, going too slow to get it to the goal, and; Sly only gets two pucks into the scoring area, which prove to be off-target.; Andrew then announces a "sudden death" round and gives the drivers additional instructions on how to score, until Kevin finally scores, winning the challenge.: Results: Best Performer: Kevin, as the winner of the "sudden death" round.; Worst Performer: Dale and Shelby, since they never once got a puck into the scoring area, which Michael and Sly at least managed despite not scoring.; The Longest Reversing Challenge Ever: Despite its name, this challenge is actually somewhat shorter than its Canada's Worst Driver 8 forerunner, at 800 m (2,600 ft) instead of 1,000 m (3,300 ft). (However, the objective of having to reverse down a long course (this time in a Trans Am) while hitting as few obstacles as possible still remains.); Dale is unable to keep the Trans Am in a straight line, striking hitting 36 objects, mostly on the passenger side.; Kevin spends most of the challenge looking forward, striking a substantial number of items. He is then offered the chance to drive forwards in the Trans Am; however, Kevin drives at 60 km/h, causing him to puncture his front passenger tire after causing significant damage. (Despite this, Kevin claims that his performance was sufficient to pass, which results in criticism from Andrew and concern from Lenny.); Michael uses the Honda Prelude for his run and has trouble due to his insistence on only using his mirrors. He still posts the best run, striking only 15 objects.; Without Fred, Sly only looks out the back window once in his entire run, swerving wildly around the course. (The experts unanimously agree his performance to be the worst in any reversing-related challenge they've ever seen.); Shelby's run ends with the most hits, at a total 43 objects beings struck.; Results: Fastest Performer: Michael performed the fastest at 13:49.; Slowest Performer: Dale performed the slowest at 21:07.; Best Performer: Even though the experts considered Michael's performance poor, he struck less objects than anyone else.; Worst Performer: Even though Kevin wrecked much of the course going forward and Shelby struck 43 objects by using the accelerator, Sly was the worst due to his poor reversing and lack of observational skills.; After the challenge, Kevin sends another letter to the experts, again apologizing for his actions and vowing to improve. However, the experts demand to know Kevin's motives in sending the two letters. Despite his performance in the episode, Kevin feels that he has learned enough to graduate. In contrast, the experts tell him that, based simply on his performance in the previous challenge, his chances for graduation have decreased. Dale, Shelby and Sly once again admit that they shouldn't graduate; while Michael states his desire to graduate, he then believes that he is better off not graduating. As the drivers assemble for what would have been the graduation ceremony, Andrew says that the overall standard of driving in this episode was the worst in the entire history of the show. For the second episode in a row, Michael is the only nominee; however, Andrew says that the experts refused to even consider graduating him, given that he only did especially well in The Trough. For the first time in the show's history, three consecutive episodes pass without a single graduation.
6	"Slip and Slide"	December 2, 2013
Camaro Challenge - Reverse Flick: The drivers are each given five attempts to reverse the Camaro into a turning area surrounded by wooden boxes and foam blocks, at which point they will be required to quickly spin the car 180° while remaining within the area.; Kevin takes the challenge first - on his first four attempts, he fails to enter the turning area, crashing through the entry lane markers on every turn. On his fifth attempt, he almost goes through the lane markers again, but is able to stop and correct himself; subsequently, he successfully executes the manoeuvre and passes.; Similar to Kevin, Michael repeatedly drives through the lane markers and fails to get into the turning area. On his fifth attempt, he nearly gets the technique right, but accidentally hits the accelerator instead of the brake, reversing far off-course into the adjoining field.; Despite having to be reminded by Andrew to adjust his seat, Shelby carries out the Reverse Flick flawlessly on his first attempt and passes with ease.; On her first run, Dale drives extremely slowly and backs into a lane marker. The subsequent stress causes her to completely forget the lesson she was taught; Andrew decides to accompany her on her second run. However, she reverses into the lane marker and then gives up.; On his first two attempts, Sly veers to one side and speeds, crashing through the outer wall of the turning area. On his third attempt, he manages to successfully spin the car around and pass, albeit admitting to not really knowing how he did it.; Results: Best Performer: Shelby, who passed on his first attempt with no difficulty.; Worst Performer: Dale, who gave up after only two runs. Of the drivers who did take all five runs, Michael did the worst by hitting the gas instead of the brake and losing control during his final run.; School Bus Parallel Park: In this particular incarnation of the parallel parking challenge featured every year on the show, the drivers have ten attempts of no more than 30 seconds each, for a total of 5:00, to reverse an 11 m (36 ft) school bus (technically a skoolie) into a 15 m (49 ft) tight space between two cars, while not hitting anything and being no more than 30 cm (12 in) away from the curb.; Michael, Dale, Sly and Kevin combine to fail 40 consecutive attempts due to constantly hitting the curb and the other vehicles and none of them ever come close to parking the bus in the right position.; Shelby, who had his course modified in the third season from having moved only 10-foot (3.0 m) after 30 minutes of driving the bus and causing over $12,000 in damages, fares the best, eventually getting the bus parked up correctly on his final attempt and backing into the car behind the bus at a relatively low speed. (Shelby points out to Andrew that this type of parallel parking would be legal in Europe, earning him a "European Pass."); Results: Best Performer: Shelby, who had the only pass in the challenge, albeit on a technicality.; Worst Performer: Sly and Kevin, who repeatedly hit the cars in front of them or behind the space hard enough to noticeably damage them, as none of their 10 attempts came remotely well.; Camaro Challenge - Icy Corner: The objective of this challenge is to approach a simulated icy corner at 50 km/h, brake sharply to slow the car down and gradually release the brake to negotiate the corner without skidding. Each driver has five runs.; Before his first run, Kevin reveals to Andrew that he uses a walkie-talkie in his car to get directions from Lenny, defending it as necessary. Kevin subsequently has to be guided throughout the challenge, as Lenny warns him about his speed, telling him when to brake on every run. Kevin fails each time due to speeding, not looking where he wants to go, or braking too late.; Dale remembers that she passed the challenge in the sixth season, but forgets that Philippe taught her a lesson on how to complete the challenge minutes beforehand. She fails her first two runs by delaying braking; on her third, she successfully completes the challenge (but the experts deny her the pass since Danny guided her during every step of the run).; Michael passes n his first run, correctly remembering to look where he wants to go.; In each of his runs, Shelby locks up the brakes and neglects to look where he wants to go, in addition to excessively slow speed.; Sly drives at 70 km/h on his first three runs, failing each run. Prior to his fourth run, Andrew and Fred decide to tell him about this, but he still drives fast on his remaining two runs, failing them both.; Result: Best Performer: Michael, who had the only pass after Dale's pass was disallowed due to Danny coaching her.; Worst Performer: Kevin and Sly, both of whom sped and hit the brakes at the wrong time in each of their runs and consequently failed. (Shelby also failed all his runs, but took them at the correct speed.); Kevin thinks he deserves to graduate, but the experts and Lenny quickly disagree, telling him that one comparatively good challenge result isn't an indicator of graduating. Shelby and Michael both say they'd like to graduate, but are uncertain whether or not they should actually do so. Dale and Sly are told that the experts don't believe they will ever improve, with both being suggested to give up driving but they are both adamant they will continue to drive even if named Canada's Worst Driver Ever. Once again, Shelby and Michael are the nominees. While Cam favours Michael for doing well in the Icy Corner challenge (the one he feels is most likely to save a life in the real world), the other experts all agree that Michael's mistake on his final Reverse Flick run (hitting the accelerator instead of the brake) was such a severe error that he should be barred from graduating. Shelby, who would have graduated in the fifth episode of Canada's Worst Driver 3 (if Dr. Louisa Gembora, the show's psychologist that season, hadn't convinced Phillipe, Cam, Andrew, and then-head instructor Scott Marshall to graduate Billie-Jean Leslie, believing that Shelby would benefit more from staying in rehab longer - a decision that led to Shelby ultimately being named the runner-up to begin with), becomes only the third graduate of the season and the first of the runners-up to successfully do so. As Shelby and Elerick drive away, Michael, who officially joins Canada's Worst Driver 4 "winner" Ashley van Ham as the only two contestants in Canada's Worst Driver history with at least three nominations without graduating (Ashley was shortlisted four times without graduating before ultimately being named Canada's Worst Driver of Season 4), is left unhappy and wondering whether he'll ever graduate. Note: This episode did not display an opening title screen or broadcast the opening animation.
7	"What Happened?"	December 9, 2013
Camaro Challenge - Handbrake J-Turn: For this challenge, which has been run in every season except Canada's Worst Driver 7, the drivers are required to make a handbrake turn in a confined space, avoid hitting a foam figurine which features the face of their nominator and drive out of the space. Each driver will have three runs. The Camaro has also been outfitted with a "cutter handbrake," due to the car's original handbrake having broken during a test run the previous day and the cutter brake being the only replacement immediately available. During the challenge, Cam pointed out that using the handbrake J-turn on public roads would be illegal as it would be considered a stunt manoeuver.; Sly passes the challenge at his first attempt, much to the surprise of both Fred and Andrew.; Michael also passes on his first go, coming close to striking the boxes on the outside of the turning area.; Kevin, while seeming to broadly understand the technique, fails all three runs due to staying on the gas excessively and failing to brake on time, a reversal from one of only two challenges Kevin passed in the previous season (the other being the Reverse Flick), during his poor track record season.; Dale, who takes the challenge in a Honda Civic rather than the Camaro, fails her first two runs due to hitting the footbrake instead of pulling the handbrake.; Results: Best Performer: Michael and Sly, who both passed on their first attempts.; Worst Performer: Dale, who tried to give up and never came close to passing.; The Cross: This challenge, previously run in the sixth season, places the drivers at the wheel of a Crown Victoria and requires them to turn the car all the way around a cross-shaped area bordered by concrete blocks.; Kevin is first, taking nearly 28 minutes to get through the cross, while also causing numerous bumps and scrapes to the car.; Dale (openly admitting she doesn't want to continue on the show for much longer) fails to make a serious effort in the challenge, causing even more damage to the car than Kevin and taking 38 minutes to complete the challenge.; Sly proves even worse than Dale by taking the longest time yet (51 minutes), while hitting the car more than twice as many times as Kevin.; Michael, the only contestant who never did The Cross in the second season (as this challenge was first done in the third season), is the fastest in this challenge, completing it in just under 18 minutes, albeit with damage to the car.; Results: Fastest Performer: Michael performed the fastest at 17:42.; Slowest Performer: Sly performed the slowest at 51:11.; Best Performer: Even though Michael completed the fastest, Kevin had the fewest strikes with 29, including four scrapes.; Worst Performer: Even though Dale failed to make a serious effort, Sly not only had more hits than anyone else with 73, but also changed direction on 142 instances.; Limousine Slalom: In a new variation on the show's many slalom challenges, the drivers are required to negotiate a slalom of foam people in the Lincoln Town Car limousine used for the Figure-Eight Challenge earlier in the season. Each driver will have three attempts and must drive at 70 km/h in their runs.; Michael (despite discussing the basic physics behind the challenge at length with Andrew) fails all three runs due to releasing the accelerator while turning, making the limo's front-end too heavy to properly negotiate the slalom, and culminating in him driving into the adjoining field in his final run (something every other driver would do at least once in this challenge).; Dale is the weakest performer on this challenge by going far off the track in her first run after using the gas rather than the brake when leaving the track, spinning out on her second attempt. (Andrew asks Dale to remember the techniques Shyamala taught her earlier in the season to stay calm, but Dale admits that she didn't pay attention in their therapy session.) On her final attempt, Dale goes violently off the track, the limo careening sideways for several dozen feet into the adjoining field.; Like Michael, Kevin fails all three of his attempts due to gripping the steering wheel incorrectly and understeering on each of his turns.; Finally, Sly causes a 100% failure rate in this challenge by going off the track on his first and third attempts; he also strikes most of the dummies on all three efforts.; Results: Best Performer: None of the drivers came close to passing.; Worst Performer: All four drivers saw significantly poor performance, while Dale was reprimanded for her lackadaisical attitude.; In the customary meeting with the experts, Sly immediately admits that, despite a rare challenge pass, he's destined for the final. Kevin initially wants to graduate, quickly withdrawing his request upon Andrew pointing out that he failed every single challenge this episode. Michael admits he didn't do especially well this episode, though he doesn't think he's Canada's Worst Driver Ever. Dale fails to show up for her scheduled meeting with the experts. Upon investigation, the production team discovers that she had checked out of the hotel. She later returns with a bandaged left hand, revealing that she severed a tendon in her finger. After initially claiming that she could not remember how the injury occurred, Dale reveals that, upon finding her home empty, she broke the front window in an attempt to enter her house, thus severing the tendon. When Dale attempts to dismiss the incident as insignificant, Andrew notes that she had effectively tried to quit the show. Dale responds with a statement regarding "personal realities" and how she occasionally existed in a different world from everyone else. Observing that her hand injury has a recovery period of several months - and concluding that she was not mentally competent to drive - the experts unanimously recommended that she stops driving. Dale dismisses the recommendation by stating that she would continue to drive until being physically unable to drive. Because of her attempting to quit and refusing to take responsibility for her actions, the experts decide not to even afford Dale a medical-based departure (they afforded one for Angelina three episodes earlier, with the alternative being that Angelina would be expelled otherwise—and instead simply expel her from rehab (joining Canada's Worst Driver 2 contestant Colin Sheppard as the only person to be expelled by the experts, although Colin was expelled for an unwillingness to change), with Cam even implying an intention to contact the Ontario Ministry of Transport to ask that Dale's driver's license be put up for review. At what would have been the penultimate graduation ceremony, Andrew appears to destroy Dale's driver's license, but reveals that what he actually destroyed was just a copy, then hands the real license over to Danny, who agrees to drive Dale back home, setting the stage for an all-male finale (the first-ever instance of such in the show's history and the second to have three people of the same gender after the all-female finale in the fourth season); Andrew announces that either Kevin, Michael or Sly will be Canada's Worst Driver Ever. During the preview at the end of the show, however, it was revealed that Dale had returned for the final graduation ceremony (leaving viewers to question whether Cam carried out his threat of contacting the Ontario Ministry of Transport to ask them for a review of Dale's license or if Dale is named Canada's Worst Driver Ever).
8	"The Envelope, Please!"	December 16, 2013
The Reverse Gauntlet: In a challenge which combines elements of the Longest Reversing Challenge Ever and the Slalom, the drivers are tasked with reversing a 1960 Lincoln Premiere down a narrow straight bordered by cars and concrete blocks, then perform a reverse slalom around a set of foam figurines, before driving the car back to the start forward. Each driver has ten attempts and must complete the course in under a minute.; Sly takes six attempts to leave the initial straight, with an equally poor performance in the slalom section, driving off the track twice. During the course of his runs, the car's battery dies and then fails entirely by the ninth attempt. (With the engine deemed unfixable in the time available, a Ford F-250 truck is brought in for the remainder of the challenge.); Much to the dismay of Andrew and the nominators, Michael has a worse performance than Sly, exiting the initial straight section on two occasions, mostly due to his continued refusal to use the technique of looking out of the back window while reversing.; Kevin initially sees similar performance than the other two men, but begins to grasp knowledge challenge; on his seventh run, he takes excessive time to finish. On his eight attempt, he successfully passes within 12 seconds of time, six seconds faster than it took Andrew to demonstrate.; Since Sly has one attempt left, he's takes it in the truck, immediately failing by violently striking the first vehicle bordering the initial straight, mangling the driver's side taillight in the process.; Results: Best Performer: Kevin, who was the only one to pass, beating Andrew's demonstration time by six seconds.; Worst Performer: Although Michael's performance was initially seen as worse, Sly ends up causing a violent crash with his remaining attempt in the truck.; Camaro Challenge - The Mega-Challenge: For what Andrew claims to be the show's most demanding Mega-Challenge yet, the drivers will each begin with a combined Eye of the Needle and Slalom, which ends in an Icy Corner that they have to safely negotiate. The drivers then have to navigate a forward section of wheel rims, then turn the car around in a space enclosed by concrete barriers, before ending the challenge with a reverse-flick.; Sly goes first, striking the majority of arches and a foam figure in the initial section, then fails the Icy Corner. He then strikes several wheel rims in the forward section, damages the Camaro in the concrete turning space, and strikes more wheel rims in the reversing section. By accidentally leaving the Camaro in reverse while removing stuck rims, Sly ends up causing the car to roll off without him. He attempts the reverse flick late and understeers on his final attempt, failing.; Kevin performs both the Eye of the Needle/Slalom combo and the Icy Corner flawlessly, causing Andrew to congratulate him just before he begins the wheel rim section. By the wheel rim section, Kevin starts knocking down the rims; the ensuing frustration results in Kevin scraping the car while turning it around. Finally, Kevin destroys the left-hand side of the vehicle during the reverse flick challenge.; Michael has the final run, getting the initial straight correct without striking any arches or foam figures; he then fails the Icy Corner. Like Kevin, his mounting frustration then causes him to start knocking down the wheel rims; he then turns the Camaro around without any strikes, but then continues to knock down rims in the reverse section. Michael ends up frustrated when he fails the reverse flick by turning the steering wheel incorrectly.; Results: Best Performer: Kevin, who completed all but the Icy Corner without issue.; Worst Performer: Sly, who failed to successfully complete a single part of the challenge.; Road Test: As in the previous two seasons, the final road test takes place in Hamilton, Ontario, this time in a Corvette, with the beginning and ending in the Hamilton City Hall Municipal Service Centre parking lot at the intersection of Hunter Street West and Park Street South.; Michael is first up, driving confidently, following directions, and negotiating some confusing intersections. However, he runs two red lights in quick succession (the intersection of James Street North and Cannon Street and the intersection of King Street West and Hess Street North); Michael is, however, unhappy about the two moving violations that would have only cost him $650 had he been caught (a far cry from the six moving violations he committed during his Toronto drive seven years ago, a drive that took just over three hours to complete), yet his performance saved him being named Canada's Worst Driver.; To Andrew's astonishment, Sly's drive is perfect - other than excessive shoulder-checking, he makes no mistakes - a major contrast from when he stopped in the middle of an intersection by trying to read the crossing street signs during his initial final drive two years earlier. (Much like his previous final drive, however, Sly only partially promises not to eat or use handheld gadgets while in the car.); Despite performing the best in the two prior challenges, Kevin's run proves to be disastrous. Within the opening minutes, he turns left from the middle lane onto Caroline Street South (after he promised Andrew following the Mega-Challenge that he wouldn't), repeating his mistake while trying to turn onto Hughson Street South from Main Street East and denying it. He then commits a serious offense by passing a stopped police car on Arkledun Avenue without changing lanes (something that Cam notes is usually an instant $490 fine, demerit points, and jail if repeated). As the drive continues, he scrapes the Corvette's bumper turning around, makes several illegal lane changes, runs a red light, and stops in the middle of the intersection of King Street West and Summers Lane, resulting in his 13th moving violation. Andrew has to prevent Kevin from turning left onto the MacNab Street Bus Terminal from the middle lane of King Street West and onto King Street East from the middle lane of Hughson Street South twice (which would have caused him to collide with a bus and a car, respectively). Kevin then pulls over into the parking lot of the Pioneer gas station on King Street West while heading for the highway (which wasn't shown), phones Lenny, and concedes he's Canada's Worst Driver Ever. Lenny persuades him to finish the drive (proving not to be the voice of reason Andrew thought), but Andrew warns Kevin that should he commit any more ticketable offenses, the drive will be stopped immediately.; Kevin subsequently turns from Main Street West onto James Street South into an oncoming traffic lane, leading to him stopping just yards away from a collision with a car coming from the other direction. Andrew consequently halts the drive, taking Kevin to the Impark parking lot at the corner of James Street North and King William Street himself, the closest parking lot around; embarrassed, Kevin breaks down in tears when calling Lenny on the phone again. (Andrew notes that with Sly's drive being flawless and Michael having done relatively well on his, despite running two red lights - and "barring a miracle," as Andrew notes - Kevin's status as Canada's Worst Driver Ever is certain.): Results: Best Performer: Sly, who didn't commit a single ticketable offense during his drive.; Worst Performer: Kevin, whose driving was so dangerous that Andrew was eventually forced to stop the drive after he nearly collided head-on with another car.; In his final meeting with the judges, Kevin gives a rather unconvincing answer when asked if he intends to follow through with his promise of quitting driving, prompting Andrew to call in Lenny; he reveals that Kevin told him he would only temporarily give up driving to take lessons to improve his skills (a far cry from what Lenny said in the audition video: "he's made a vow to me-- referring to Kevin-- that if he doesn't graduate this year or if the panel says stop driving, he will stop driving altogether and cut up his license"), leaving the experts unsettled by Kevin's actions; Lenny is then shown a video of Kevin's final drive to show just how incompetent to drive he is. Michael is convinced that he is not the worst; Sly admits that, despite his road test performance, he doesn't believe he is a better driver than either Kevin or Michael.: In the final discussion as to who is the worst: Shyamala and Philippe make a shocking suggestion—that, despite having been expelled the previous episode, Dale should still be named Canada's Worst Driver Ever for not even participating in the final challenges and road test, adding her unstable behaviour during both her stints in rehab.; However, Andrew and Cam believe that Kevin is worse, with Cam noting that he had a serious accident within the past year (as Kevin admitted to Andrew at the beginning of the season) and that, for all her faults, Dale hasn't had any such serious accidents in recent years, leaving Tim with the deciding vote.; As Kevin, Michael and Sly assemble for the trophy presentation, a van pulls up with Dale. Andrew begins by announcing that Michael is not Canada's Worst Driver Ever and returns his license to him. As Michael and Eric drive away, Andrew's voiceover notes that, while he still has a lot of improving to do, Michael is an improved driver now than in his original appearance and not Canada's Worst Driver Ever. History repeats as Sly's strong final drive manages to override his poor track record in the contest, saving him from being named the worst (as previously happened in the seventh season). However, due to his poor overall performance and the fact that he ultimately showed no improvement over his previous appearance, Andrew asks Fred to drive Sly home, recommending that Sly only drive when absolutely necessary from now on. Despite believing she will be named the worst, history repeats for Dale as well, as she avoids the title due to the experts feeling she was ,ore aware of the dangers of driving than Kevin and Cam, predicting that her license will soon be revoked anyway. As a result, Kevin is named the outright worst this time, with Andrew presenting him with the trophy. Afterwards, Andrew lights a road flare, asking Kevin to use it to destroy his license. Kevin initially refuses to do so, but Lenny sternly persuades him to go through with it: the license is completely burned away by the flare, after which Lenny drives Kevin away. In an ending voiceover, Andrew reveals that, while Kevin hasn't driven since the show was filmed, he has both failed to sell his existing car and bought a replacement.
