= List of French-language Canadian game shows =

The following is a list of French-language game shows that air and have aired in Canada (mainly in Quebec).

== 0–9 ==
- 100 génies (2019–present)

== A ==
- À la Poursuite de Carmen Sandiego (1998–2001) (French-language version of Where in Time Is Carmen Sandiego?)
- Action Réaction (1986–1990) (French-language version of Chain Reaction)
- Allume-moi (2013–2014) (French-language version of Taken Out)
- Atomes Crochus (2010–2016) (French-language version of Match Game)

== B ==
- Le Banquier (2007–2017) (French-language version of Deal or No Deal)
- Les Beaux Parleurs (2001–2002) (French-language version of Street Smarts)

== C ==
- Call TV (2009–2011)
- Le Cercle (2005–2011)
- Chacun son Métier (1954–1959) (French-language version of What's My Line?)
- Charivari (1987–1991)
- La classe de 5e (2009–2011) (French-language version of Are You Smarter than a 5th Grader?)
- Coup de foudre (1988–1993)

== D ==
- Des Squelettes Dans le Placard (2006–2019)
- Les Détecteurs de Mensonges (1990–2001)
- Devine Combien je Gagne (2009–present) (French-language version of Win My Wage)
- Distraction (2009)
- Double Défi (1989–1990) (French-language version of Double Dare)

== E ==
- L'Échelle du Talent (2010–2011)
- L'École des Fans (2005–2008)
- L'Épicerie en folie (1994–1995) (French-language adaptation of Supermarket Sweep)

== F ==
- Face au Mur (2018) (French-language version of The Wall)
- Fais-moi un Dessin (1988–1991) (French-language version of Win, Lose or Draw)
- La Fureur (1998–2007)

== G ==
- Génies en herbe (1972–1997)
- La Guerre des clans (1992–1997, 2009–2017, 2018–2019) (French-language version of Family Feud)

== I ==
- Les Indices Pensables (1999–2000)
- L'Instant Gagnant (2012–2015)

== J ==
- Jeopardy! (1991–1993)

== L ==
- Lingo (1998–2001)

== M ==
- Mais, où se Cache Carmen Sandiego? (1995–1998) (French-language version of Where in the World Is Carmen Sandiego?)
- Misez Juste (1994–1995) (original short-lived French-language version of The Price Is Right)
- Le Moment de Vérité (2007–2011) (French-language version of Happy Family Plan)
- Les Mordus (1997–2001)
- Le Mur (2009) (French-language version of Hole in the Wall)

== O ==
- On connaît la chanson! (2011–2014) (French-language version of Don't Forget the Lyrics!)

== P ==
- Paquet Voleur (2007–?)
- Piment Fort (1993–2001, 2016–2017)
- La Poule aux oeufs d'or (1958–1966) & (1993–present)
- The Price Is Right: À vous de Jouer (2011–2012) (French-language version of The Price Is Right)
- Privé de Sens (2011–?)
- Pyramide (2008–2011) (French-language version of Pyramid)

== Q ==
- Que le Meilleur Gagne (1993–1996, 2007) (French-language version of Everybody's Equal)
- Québec à la Carte (1985–1989)

== R ==
- La Roue Chanceuse (1989–1992) (French-language version of Wheel of Fortune)

== S ==
- Silence, on Joue! (2015–present) (French-language version of Hollywood Game Night)
- Skatoony (2006–2010)
- Synchro (2010–?)

== T ==
- Taxi Payant (2009–2018) (French-language version of Cash Cab)
- Tic Tac Show (2013–2014) (French-language revival of Hollywood Squares)
- Tic Tac Toc (1978–1979) (Original French-language version of Hollywood Squares)
- Le tournoi de mètres (2007)
- Tous Contre Un (2001–2003)
- Tous pour un (1963–1969, 1992–1995, 2007–2011)
- Le Travail à la Chaîne (1972–1981)
- Le Tricheur (2012–present)

== U ==
- Ultimatum (2001–2004)
- L'Union Fait la Farce (1976–1978) (original French-language version of Match Game)
- L'Union Fait la Force (2003–2015)

== V ==
- Vingt-et-un (2004–2005) (French-language version of Twenty One)

== W ==
- Wipeout Québec (2009) (French-language version of Wipeout)
- Wizz (2002–2003)

== Z ==
- Les Zigotos (1994–1998)
- Zizanie (1990–1992)

== See also ==
- List of English-language Canadian game shows
- List of American game shows
- List of British game shows
- List of Australian game shows
- Game show
- List of international game shows
- List of television programs
- UKGameshows.com (a British website devoted to reviews and descriptions of game shows)
- Game Show Network (an American television channel devoted to Game shows)
- GameTV (a Canadian television channel devoted to Game shows)
- Challenge (a British television channel devoted to Game shows)
- Nickelodeon GAS (a defunct television channel devoted to airing Nickelodeon game shows)
