= You Bet Your Ass =

Canadian game show

- Genre: Game show
- Created by: Christopher Geddes; Michael Geddes
- Presented by: Stewart Francis; Sitara Hewitt
- Country of origin: Canada
- Original language: English
- No. of seasons: 2

Production
- Running time: 30 minutes
- Production company: Lone Eagle Entertainment

Original release
- Network: The Comedy Network

You Bet Your Ass is a Canadian game show that aired on The Comedy Network. It followed a blackjack and casino motif, with contestants answering questions on popular culture to earn points. The contestant with the most points at the end of the show was the winner.

Hosted by Canadian comedian Stewart Francis and his co-host, Sitara Hewitt, the show premiered in 2005. As of June 25, 2007, the Comedy Network dropped You Bet Your Ass from its weekday lineup, replacing it with reruns of This Hour Has 22 Minutes. Reruns of You Bet Your Ass began airing in the weekday morning block on April 28, 2008 (replacing History Bites).

The series was created by Michael Geddes and Christopher Geddes of Lone Eagle Entertainment in Toronto, Ontario, Canada, who are the producers of two other game shows, Game On and Inside the Box.

The show was taped at the Canadian Broadcasting Centre in Toronto.

== Rounds ==
The game was played in four rounds.

=== Piece of Ass ===
In the first round, "Piece of Ass", the three contestants are shown a category. Francis says the show's "Hit me" to reveal a category and the contestant must answer a question for 100 points. The contestant in the left podium begins the round. After seeing the category, a contestant has the option of "doubling down", to receive two questions in the category, for 200 points. However, if the contestant gets a question wrong, not only do they lose points corresponding to how much it was worth (100 normally, 200 for a double-down), but the other players have a chance to steal the question. Players are given 1000 points to begin the game. Also, one player may get a wild card instead of a category, and they must choose an opponent from whom to take 500 points if they can answer a single question.

=== Dirty Dozen ===
Round two was the "Dirty Dozen", much like the typical "lightning round" on many game shows. 12 questions were asked (4 per contestant), with a spotlight randomly falling on a contestant who must then answer directly. The correct answer to each question serves to segue to the next question. Questions are worth 500 points apiece (100 in season 1), and no points are lost on incorrect responses. In season 1, the contestant who answers was determined before Stewart read the question; however, in season 2, Stewart would read the question and then the contestant would be chosen.

=== Up Your Ass ===
Round three was "Up Your Ass". It takes the same form as round one, only with 200 or 400 points at stake, and 1000 points are again given to all players.

=== Ass on the Line ===
The final round, "Ass on the Line", presented the players with four categories. The player with the lowest score got first choice and could wager any amount up to their total on each of three successive questions in the chosen category, with a minimum bet of 500 points (100 in season 1). The round is over for players who fall below the minimum. The player who began the round in second place chose from the three remaining categories and the same structure applied, followed by the same routine for the player that was leading to begin the round.

=== Winning and bonus round ===
Whoever had the most points at the completion of the final round won $500 and then got to see one final category, and could choose to answer one question for a further $1,000, or to answer two questions for a further $2,000. Regardless of the choice, it was an all-or-nothing bonus: if, for example, the player opted to answer two questions, but answered the first one correctly and misses the second, they would only win the $500 for winning the game.

In season 1, the winner could choose to take $500 or "double down" and attempt to answer one final question correctly for $1,000, but a wrong answer meant they got nothing. If a game ended in a tie, the double down question was not offered and the tied contestants split the $1,000 prize automatically.

== Running gags ==
- Sitara wears a different shirt every episode, each one featuring a different motto or creed, such as "Brunettes have more fun" and "My ass is always on the line."
- When a round ends, the sound of a donkey is heard. Occasionally, Stewart would say, "That's my wife, gotta go".

== Notable contestants ==
- Actor Chris Kalhoon, who went on to star with Jennifer Love Hewitt in The Client List and Milla Jovovich in Faces in the Crowd, was a contestant on the pilot episode.
- Colin Sheppard, who was expelled from Canada's Worst Driver 2, was a contestant in the second season.
- Boomer Phillips, Andrew Johnston & Trevor Boris, recurring jurors on the hit Canadian show Video on Trial, were contestants in the third season.
