= Stewart Francis =

Canadian comedian, actor and writer

- Born: January 1, 1959 (age 67); Toronto, Canada
- Notable work: You Bet Your Ass

Comedy career
- Medium: Stand-up, television
- Genres: Deadpan, Wit
- Subject: One liners

Stewart Francis is a Canadian comedian, actor and writer. Known for his deadpan delivery of irreverent one-liners and humorous wordplay, Francis has toured worldwide as a stand up, particularly in the US, the UK, and in his native Canada. He has made numerous appearances on mainstream British television in shows such as Live at the Apollo and Mock the Week. In the US, he was a regular guest on The Late Late Show with Craig Ferguson.

== Early life ==
Francis was born in St. Joseph's Health Centre in Toronto, and attended Eatonville Junior School, in Etobicoke. Both of Francis' parents are British.

== Career ==
=== Stand-up ===
Francis has headlined all over North America and the United Kingdom. He has also performed in numerous venues worldwide, including Hong Kong, South Africa, and throughout Europe. On 6 June 2009 he performed on the Edinburgh section of Michael McIntyre's Comedy Roadshow. Francis was the support act for Ricky Gervais on his Science tour, performing in such places as Portsmouth Guildhall, New Theatre, Oxford, Brighton Centre and the O2 Arena in Dublin in late 2009 and early 2010. He has also made 12 appearances on popular British panel show Mock the Week. He appeared on Live at the Apollo on 9 December 2010 and 14 December 2012. In 2012 he won the annual award for the funniest joke of the Edinburgh Fringe. He announced his final standup tour would take place during 2018 and 2019. His final stand up appearance was on 7 December 2019.

=== Acting ===
Stewart starred as a series regular on An American in Canada and also acted in Kevin Hill. In 2007, he appeared in an episode of the BBC sitcom Not Going Out as Hilary Allison. (The producers said in an interview that he had been considered for the part of recurring character Guy, but rejected because he was too young and given this role instead.) He also made a brief appearance in The Omid Djalili Show.

=== Writing ===
Stewart has written for The Tonight Show with Jay Leno, The Gemini Awards and Puppets Who Kill, as well as having his work published in The Hockey News.

=== Television work ===
In the US he was a regular guest on The Late Late Show with Craig Ferguson and he was the host of trivia game show You Bet Your Ass. In the UK, his TV appearances include The Comedy Store, Mock the Week, 8 out of 10 Cats, The Big Stage, For One Night Only and Michael McIntyre's Comedy Roadshow. After his first appearance on Mock the Week as an almost unknown, he was so successful he was asked back three more times in the series that followed. In 2010 Stewart appeared in a special Children in Need episode of Mastermind where his specialist subject was the Toronto Maple Leafs.

== Stand-up DVDs ==
- Live – Tour de Francis (22 November 2010)
- Live: Outstanding in His Field (26 November 2012)
- Pun Gent (28 November 2016)
