= 5-4-3-2-Run =

Canadian children's game show

- Created by: Mark Maxwell-Smith
- Directed by: Michael Watt; Henry Irizawa
- Presented by: Andrew Cochrane
- Composer: Bob York
- Country of origin: Canada
- No. of seasons: 2
- No. of episodes: 34

Production
- Executive producer: W. Paterson Ferns
- Producers: William C. Elliott; Steven Glassman
- Production locations: BCTV Studios; Burnaby, British Columbia
- Production company: Comedia/Artray Productions

Original release
- Network: CTV
- Release: 1988 – 1990

5-4-3-2-Run is a Canadian children's game show. It aired from 1988 to 1990 on CTV in Canada and on many independent stations in the United States. Hosted by Andrew Cochrane, the show featured children competing in a combination of general-knowledge questions and physical stunts akin to Double Dare. The show was taped at the BCTV studios in Burnaby, British Columbia.

It was renewed for a second season by CTV in 1989. The show aired briefly in US syndication circa late 1988-early 1989 on a few stations, including on WPHL Philly. The show was canceled by CTV in 1990.

== Gameplay ==
Two full rounds were played during each show. The contestants, known as "runners", were randomly picked out of the studio audience upon a correct response to a question. Four players were chosen for each game.

In each round, a category was given and possible answers were shown on monitors at the end of the playing course. The goal was to pick the answers that fit within the category. To give time to randomize the answers, the players were asked to complete a stunt such as walking on stilts. Once they reached the bin at the other end of the course, each player chose one of the answers and were also given the option of staying where they were or trading into the one seat that was empty or with another player (in the latter event, the other must agree to the trade for it to take place). When all players were satisfied with their choice, they pushed a plunger on the desk. Those who picked a correct answer moved on to the next round, while those who picked an incorrect answer would get something dumped on their head and be eliminated from further play, but still winning a consolation prize. The one or two players remaining at the end of the round would move on to the bonus round.

The winners from each game played in the bonus round. The players were shown four prizes, and were asked to choose the prize they most wanted to play for. If only one player chose a particular prize, that player had to answer only one question to win that prize. If more than one player chose the same prize, then a "face-off" took place with the last person to give a correct answer to a question winning the prize. Nobody left the game empty-handed, at the very least they took home a board game as their prize.
