= Tous contre un =

Canadian television quiz show

Tous contre un was a daily quiz show, broadcast live on Télé-Québec in Canada from September 2001 to March 2003. It was hosted by Marc-André Coallier.

Contestants had to answer questions based on the day's current news. Television viewers could also play on the Internet (in sync with the studio game) and win prizes. The final game of each program pitted the studio winner against 10 Internet contestants. The program's chief innovation was its proprietary computer system which allowed a perfect synchronisation between questions displayed on the television screen and on the Internet players' display screens.

The program was produced by Groupe Tele-Vision Inc. and was created by Eric F. Lemieux and Daniel Cormier.
