= Game On (Canadian game show) =

Sports trivia game show

Game On! is a Canadian sports trivia television game show that was a variation on Jeopardy!. It ran from 1998 to 2000 on Global and was shown on GameTV. The show was hosted by Tim Steeves in season 1 and David Merry in Season 2, with Jennifer Hill as the female co-host. Three male contestants compete in this game. The set was designed to resemble a sports enthusiast's wood-paneled basement recreation room decorated with posters, trophies and other sports memorabilia. The host stood behind a 1970s-style wet bar while the three contestants sat in leather lounge chairs. To answer a question, a contestant pressed a button on a device that resembled a TV remote control.

The series was created by Michael Geddes of Lone Eagle Entertainment in Toronto, Ontario, who producers of two other Canadian game shows, You Bet Your Ass and Inside the Box. The show was taped at the Toronto Production Centre in Toronto.

== Rounds ==
=== Round One ===
4 categories (5 in season 2) were announced, each with a column of four questions, each one valued incrementally more than the previous, ostensibly by difficulty. Each category had something to do with sports. The values ranged from 100 to 400 points

The returning champion, or if there were three new contestants the winner of a pre-show draw, sits in the yellow chair and begins the game by selecting a category and monetary value (e.g., "What Team for 100"). The host then reads the question after which any of the three contestants can buzz in. The first contestant to buzz-in following the host's reading of the question must then answer.

A correct answer earned the point value of the question and the opportunity to select the next clue from the board. An incorrect answer or a failure to respond within a 5-second time limit resulted in a deduction of points from the player's score and gave any remaining opponents the opportunity to ring in and respond. If the second contestant gives an incorrect answer, the correct answer was read, (sometimes Merry lets Hill guess in season 2) and the player who has most recently given a correct answer to a question chose the next one. The round ended when time ran out or all the questions had been selected. Hill got almost every question right when Merry asked.

=== Round Two ===
This round is the same as the first one except:

- The point values are doubled.
- There are new categories.
- The player with the last correct answer at the end of round one picks first.

=== Bud Light Two Minute Warning ===
This round is played differently:

- There are new categories. This time, the categories are more straightforward.
- Each category has three questions instead of four.
- The point values are 1,000, 3,000 and 5,000.
- Each contestant will choose one question but will not use their remotes to answer.
- In the first episode, each contestant picks the category and amount before the questions are read.

=== Winning ===
The player in the lead after three questions wins, given a trophy by Hill, and comes back next show in the yellow chair in the middle. Champions can stay for up to five episodes. There is a special show at the end of the season in which the three highest-scoring champions play for a grand prize.

=== Prizes ===
The 3 players who returned for the championship show competed for these prizes:

Season 1:

- 1st Place: a 56-inch TV, a pool table and cue rack, A custom Bud Light refrigerator and Rec Room memorabilia package. Winner: Jon Quick
- 2nd Place: a 32-inch TV, dartboard & scoreboard and a Bud Light custom refrigerator
- 3rd Place: a 27-inch TV and a Bud Light Rec Room memorabilia package

Season 2:

- 1st Place: A trip for two to Hawaii, tickets to the NFL Pro Bowl and a Bud Light custom refrigerator. Winner: Ed Ponikvar
- 2nd Place: A trip for two to Whistler, British Columbia and a CA$500 shopping spree at Big Star. Winner: Steve Cohen
- 3rd Place: CA$500 shopping spree at Big Star and a Bud Light custom refrigerator. Winner: Ryan Love

== Season 2 changes ==
- There were 5 categories.
- There was a studio audience (season 1 used canned laughter and applause), season 2 host David Merry referred to the audience as the "bleacher creatures".
- There were no scoreboards in front of the contestants. Only the home audience saw the score.
