= Inside the Box =

Canadian game show

- Created by: Michael Geddes; Christopher Geddes
- Directed by: Sidney M. Cohen
- Presented by: Sam Kalilieh
- Theme music composer: Peter Warnica
- Country of origin: Canada

Production
- Executive producer: Michael Geddes
- Producer: Rachel Horvath
- Production locations: Global Television; Toronto, Ontario
- Running time: 30 min.
- Production company: Lone Eagle Entertainment

Original release
- Network: TVtropolis
- Release: September 18, 2006 – December 7, 2007

Inside the Box is a Canadian television game show that debuted on September 18, 2006, on the cable network TVtropolis, and was syndicated in the United States by Program Partners in the 2008 television season. In the show, three contestants compete for a chance to win up to CA$10,000 by trying to guess television shows, characters, or actors by asking the other contestants either yes or no questions related to the subject. The show ran for two seasons, ending on December 7, 2007.

The series was created by Michael Geddes and Christopher Geddes of Lone Eagle Entertainment in Toronto, Ontario, and is hosted by actor/comedian Sam Kalilieh. The two were also producers of two other game shows, Game On and You Bet Your Ass. Audience sound effects were used in this show instead of a studio audience.

== Gameplay ==
The game has a similar format to 20 Questions, with a few minor twists. Three rounds in total are played. Three contestants compete for a chance at CA$10,000. In the first two rounds, each contestant gets a turn inside a television-shaped booth called "The Box" which contains 2 monitors, while the other two players are seated at separate desks with single monitors facing and to the left and right of "The Box". The contestant "Inside the Box" is given a basic category to indicate what kind of an answer is being sought (for example, "Series", "Reality Series", "Male Actor", "Female Character", etc.), a list of questions on a touch-sensitive screen and reads questions selected from the list to one of their two opponents. Answers are usually derived from American pop culture. The opponents outside The Box are shown only a photograph and the name of the character/actor/show which is the correct answer on their monitor screens.

The contestant in the booth has two minutes to determine the correct answer by alternately asking their opponents the "Yes or No" questions they are shown. If an opponent answers the question incorrectly, they are given a time penalty of 5 seconds. Each Yes-response question is displayed on screen for the viewers to see and on the second screen in The Box, regardless of whether the player outside the Box answered correctly or not. After each group of 5 "Yes" responses, the clock is stopped, new questions are made available to the Box contestant and a more detailed clue is given. The player in the Box is given a free guess, but if they can't correctly answer, the clock resumes and they must continue asking questions. The contestant continues to ask questions until either time runs out, or they are able to give a correct answer. The player in The Box may ask at any time for the clock to be stopped so they can attempt a guess, but an incorrect guess under these conditions results in a 5-second penalty. After each player's turn in The Box, the scores are totalled and time penalties assessed; then the remaining contestants are given their turn in The Box.

The scoring is based on time; for instance, if a player correctly identifies the answer with 35 seconds to spare, those 35 seconds are added to their score. Any time penalties are deducted and negative scores are possible. Each player gets two turns in The Box and the player with the best cumulative time after the first two rounds gets a chance to play the final round.

=== Final round ===
In the final round, the champion is given two minutes. Instead of asking their opponents the "Yes or No" questions, they ask them to host Sam Kalilieh. The champion is given a starting clue and every 5 "Yes" responses earn another clue; however, the clock does not stop in the final round. They are given three chances to give the answer. The amount of money in the pot is reduced by CA$500 approximately every six seconds until time runs out. If the player gives the correct answer before time expires, they win whatever money is remaining. If they give 3 incorrect answers or time runs out, they take home the minimum consolation prize of CA$500.

== Syndication ==
In the United States, Program Partners, a division of Sony Pictures Television, syndicated Inside the Box to local stations for the first half of the 2008–09 season, as an optional replacement or companion program for Merv Griffin's Crosswords, which was then on hiatus (although very few American stations actually took the series). However, it was eventually decided not to go forth with additional first-run episodes of Crosswords, and both shows were officially cancelled in February 2009. () Reruns started airing on Comedy Gold and Canada's E! September 3, 2013, while GameTV picked it up on April 3, 2017. The show was dropped from E!'s schedule on September 1, 2017, and Comedy Gold dropped it, along with many other of its shows, on December 29, 2017. GameTV aired only 40 season 2 shows until being removed on April 1, 2019. The show returned to GameTV's lineup on September 12, 2022, this time airing shows from both seasons.
