= Make a Match =

Canadian game show television series

- Genre: Game show
- Country of origin: Canada
- Original language: English
- No. of seasons: 1

Production
- Producer: Oliver Wakefield
- Production location: Montreal

Original release
- Network: CBC Television
- Release: 6 November 1954 – 15 February 1955

Make a Match is a Canadian game show that aired on CBC Television from 1954 to 1955.

== Premise ==
In each episode of this Montreal-produced series, a four-person panel was faced with another group of seven people which included three couples and a seventh person who was frequently disguised. The panel attempted to determine who the couples were in the seven-person group. The panel itself consisted of male and female married people plus single people, also of each gender.

== Scheduling ==
This half-hour series aired Saturdays at 7:00 p.m. from 6 to 28 November 1954, moving to the Tuesday 10:30 p.m. time slot from 7 December 1954 where it was broadcast on alternate weeks until its last episode on 15 February 1955. House Party was broadcast on the other Tuesdays.
