= Canada's Worst Driver 2 =

- Season 2
- No. of episodes: 8

Release
- Original network: Discovery Channel
- Original release: October 16 – December 4, 2006

Season chronology
- ← Previous; Canada's Worst Driver season 1 Next → Canada's Worst Driver 3

Canada's Worst Driver 2 is the second season of the Canadian reality TV show Canada's Worst Driver, which aired on the Discovery Channel. As with the past season, eight people, nominated by their family or friends, enter the Driver Rehabilitation Centre to improve their driving skills. In season 2, Driver Rehabilitation Centre is located at CFB Borden. Unlike the previous season, when the focus was on Winter Driving, the focus of this season was on Summer Driving. The initial drive started in Wasaga Beach, Ontario and the final road test occurred in Toronto, Ontario. The Driver Rehabilitation Program was one week shorter, due to two candidates graduating in the penultimate episode of this season.

The candidates in season 2 included a 43-year-old video game race car champion who had trouble curbing his speed on the open road; a 22-year-old student with $10,000 in unpaid tickets for speeding and parking; and a police school student who had been pulled over 40 times in 3 years.

== Experts ==
Only one expert returns from Canada's Worst Driver:

- Markus Agyeman is an insurance broker who has insured the worst of the worst at his insurance company and provides a financial standpoint to the judging table.
- Juliana Chiovitti is a performance driving instructor and has an illustrious career in auto racing, including a first-place finish in the Formula 2000 series.
- Cam Woolley is a sergeant with the Ontario Provincial Police's Highway Safety Division, specializing in traffic-related incidents, investigating traffic crimes and collisions while promoting public awareness of traffic safety. He has escorted world leaders, royalty and the Pope through some of Ontario's major highways and is considered to be the face of the OPP.
- Scott Marshall is in his second season as the show's head driving instructor.

== Contestants ==
- Karen Carson, 49 and licensed for 28 years, from Port Perry, Ontario, is a grandmother who was once confident as a driver but is now too terrified to drive. When she does drive with her husband and nominator, Allan Carson, a police officer, it leads to fighting in the car. As a result, she has not driven at all for over a year and has not driven on a highway for longer. She drives a black Subaru Forester.
- Matthew "Matt" Elkind, 29 and licensed for 13 years, from Toronto, Ontario, is a real estate agent who, because of his busy lifestyle, likes to multitask, so much so that he could be eating, smoking, reading a map, sending email and talking on a cell phone while driving with his knees. He steadfastly refuses to wear a seatbelt, as he believes it is the key reason why his life was saved in a car crash. He was nominated by his friend, Suzanne Wexler, a fashion executive. He drives a green Cadillac STS Seville.
- Henrietta Gallant, 61 and licensed for 35 years, from Rockland, Ontario (near Ottawa) (now lives in Summerside, Prince Edward Island), suffers from extreme stress while at the wheel, leading to many accidents. During the series, it is discovered that, due to having 20/100 vision like Heather Reynolds from the previous season, meaning she could only see 20% as well as other people, most of her troubles were caused by not having a proper prescription for her glasses. She was nominated by her husband, Andy Gallant, a civil servant. She drives a red Chevrolet Impala.
- Sean McConnell, 43 and licensed for 27 years, from Stratford, Ontario, is a champion video game racecar driver, having won an online competition, but uses the same techniques he uses while playing the game when driving in real life. He believes that he is safer by driving above the speed limit as it keeps him away from other bad drivers and treats every stop as if it's the start of a race. He was nominated by his niece, Melena McDermid. He drives a red Chevrolet Cavalier Z24.
- Colin Sheppard, 20 and licensed for three years, from Whitby, Ontario, is a Police Foundations graduate. Similar to Sean, he often drives above the speed limit and has gained over 30 tickets, but often uses his license as a Police Foundations graduate to get himself out of trouble. Despite this, he claims that cops "aren't the smartest people out there" and often gets involved in street racing. He was nominated by his friend, Jeremy McCaig, an independent distributor. He drives a black manual transmission Honda Civic.
- Jodi Slobodesky, 31 and licensed for 15 years, from Steinbach, Manitoba (near Winnipeg), is easily frustrated behind the wheel and becomes a driving hazard as a result. On occasions, she begins to forget basic driving notions such as the meaning of a green light. She was nominated by her husband, Sam Slobodesky, an auto body technician. She drives a red GMC Safari and drove a grey Pontiac G6 to the rehab centre.
- Michael Telford, 40 and licensed for 24 years, from West Vancouver, British Columbia (now resides on Vancouver Island), is a landlord who took nine attempts to get his driver's license in 1982 and cannot deal with surprises while driving. He also has a tendency to hold his breath when entering a tunnel and continues to hold it until he exits. He was nominated by his best friend, Eric Kozak. He drives a blue Mercedes C230 and drove a silver Ford Fusion to the rehab centre.
- Shannon Willemsen, 22 and licensed for five years, from Calgary, Alberta, is a student and a mother-to-be who enjoys totaling cars. She has 12 demerits on her license, two away from having her license revoked, while having accumulated over $10,000 in parking tickets, including a $489 ticket for driving 60 km/h over the speed limit. Her cars last on average 3–6 months before being totaled and, at this rate, she may not afford to drive for much longer due to accumulated debts from tickets and rising insurance costs, much less keep her license. She was nominated by her best friend, Sara Bailie. She drives a blue GMC Jimmy with a Chevrolet Blazer grill and drove a black Toyota Echo to the rehab centre.

== Synopsis ==
Contestant	1	2	3	4	5	6	7
Henrietta Gallant	IN	IN	IN	IN	IN	IN	CWD
Michael Telford	IN	IN	IN	IN	IN	IN	RUNNER-UP
Shannon Willemsen	IN	IN	IN	IN	IN	IN	OUT
Sean McConnell	IN	IN	IN	IN	IN	OUT	
Jodi Slobodesky	IN	IN	IN	IN	IN	OUT	
Colin Sheppard	IN	IN	IN	EXPL			
Karen Carson	IN	IN	OUT				
Matt Elkind	IN	OUT					

(CWD) The contestant became Canada's Worst Driver.
(RUNNER-UP) The contestant was runner-up for Canada's Worst Driver.
(OUT) The contestant graduated.
(IN) The contestant was shortlisted for graduation.
(EXPL) The contestant was expelled.
^1 The judges considered Sean to be the episode's graduation candidate, but decided not to graduate anyone because Sean refused to admit that driving slower was safer.
^2 Sean graduated immediately after Jodi on the condition that Melena readmit him to the Driver Rehabilitation Centre should he be caught speeding.

== Episodes ==
No.	Title	Original release date
1	TBA	October 16, 2006
The Drive to Rehab: This season, the journey to the Driver Rehabilitation Centre starts from Wasaga Beach Municipal Parking on Spruce Street in Wasaga Beach, Ontario, with the eight contestants with the eight drivers heading to rehab using a provided set of instructions, a journey that Andrew notes is an hour-long, 40 km (25 mi) drive. The contestants depart in the following order: Henrietta, Jodi, Matt, Karen, Michael, Colin, Shannon and Sean. Everyone makes a large number of moving violations on the way to rehab and the contestants arrive in the following order: Matt (who broke the law 10 times), Colin (who made 29 moving violations, enough to lose his license), Jodi (who asked Sam for advice 39 times), Sean (who received $1,540 in ticketable offenses), Henrietta (who drove 22 km (14 mi) off course), Karen (who was given 68 direct orders from Allan), Michael (never at the speed limit the whole trip) and Shannon (who drove 37 km (23 mi) off course).; First to Arrive: Matt was the third to leave, but the first to arrive.; Last to Arrive: Shannon was the last.; Slowest to Arrive: Shannon was also the slowest to arrive. During her drive, she went 37 km (23 mi) off course. She arrived at 1:49.; Fastest to Arrive: Colin, despite a promise to Andrew to obey all speed laws, arrives in 40 minutes.; Skills Evaluation: In the skills evaluation, the drivers must take a 1978 AMC Pacer and steer through a tight precision-steering course before accelerating to somewhere between 40 km/h and 50 km/h and taking one of two possible exits, one of which is too short for their car and their roof-mounted cargo, a canoe and a tricycle. Afterwards, they must park their car in reverse, making sure that the canoe does not crash into the wall behind them. As an added surprise, a car at the start of the challenge is rigged to have its doors open whenever the car comes near, which the drivers must avoid.; Best Performer: Sean, despite feeling that this is a race, hits the fewest obstacles with 15 (including the door), all of which were in the precision portion. The speed portion and the parking portions in his run went without incident.; Worst Performer: Colin was easily the worst, due to wanting to trash the Pacer more than completing the course (though, as it was revealed in a later episode, he did manage to eventually finish), which he does by intentionally hitting the obstacles in the precision portion. In short, he does not even try the challenge. Of the contestants that did try, though, Karen, aided via direct orders by Allan, hits the obstacles 49 times, including a concrete barrier on the high-speed portion.; Fastest Performer: Matt is the fastest to finish at three minutes, but hit the door, struggled through the precision portion and chooses the wrong exit. In total, he hits 28 obstacles.; Slowest Performer: Jodi visibly breaks down partway though the precision portion and it takes her three attempts through the high-speed portion due to not maintaining speed. Although it takes her 56 minutes to complete (hitting 18 obstacles), she is the only contestant to miss the door.
2	TBA	October 23, 2006
Parallel Parking: The drivers must drive a Winnebago up a hill in reverse and then parallel park it between two luxury vehicles—a Cadillac in front and a BMW behind. Andrew is seated in the BMW and is kept in communication with the motor home.; Best Performer: Neither Karen (who admits she hadn't parallel parked since 1979), Shannon nor Michael hit either car in their attempts, though Shannon hits the fewest obstacles among the three with four. Sean, the fastest at the task, manages to park in only two attempts (although his end result is that one wheel is not on solid ground).; Worst Performer: Neither Matt nor Jodi finish the challenge: for Matt, his first attempt was good, but he ended up being parallel to where he wanted to park and chooses to pull out and retry from the beginning, rather than adjust his vehicle slowly. However, each of Matt's attempts were worse than the one preceding it. For Jodi, she parks in such a way so as to hit the Cadillac in the event of brake failure. Of the contestants that do manage to park, Henrietta had the most hits and made the most attempts, not to mention caused the most damage, largely because she had never parallel parked before in her life.; Eye of the Needle: In this traditional challenge, the contestants must go through a series of box archways and between columns of boxes, first at 30 km/h and then at 60 km/h.; Best Performer: Matt manages to do both runs without destroying any boxes, but clips the right-side mirror in both runs. Michael does not hit anything at all, but had to redo his first run for failing to maintain speed.; Worst Performer: Once again, Colin fails to try in this challenge, choosing to drive at over 60 km/h in his slow run, though, like Michael, he does not hit anything. Of the contestants that did make an attempt to do the challenge as instructed, Henrietta is by far the worst—as it turns out, her 20/100 vision requires her to wear glasses to drive on the road, which she does not do. Thus, she crashes into boxes even in her slow run, where she drives at 19 km/h. Also notable is Jodi, who is the first contestant in the series to hit an obstacle on the driver's side.; Driving Distracted: Matt's stellar performance in the Eye of the Needle seemed to indicate that he is a better driver without the distractions. To demonstrate (and ultimately prove) this point, a course was set up specifically for him. There, while driving three laps around a narrow track, he does not hit any obstacles, but hits 13 of the 43 obstacles once given his cell phone, a CD, a sandwich and a drink.; Crazy Eights: In this challenge, the contestants must reverse through a figure-eight obstacle course, two contestants at a time. The contestants start at one end of the obstacle course and the only places in the course where there is enough room to pass the other car is in the middle and at the other end of the course. Henrietta and Karen have the first heat, while Matt and Jodi have the second heat, speed demons Sean and Colin (forced by Andrew to complete the challenge in front of the other contestants) have the third heat and Michael and Shannon round out the fourth heat.; Best Performer: Matt and Sean both hit two obstacles each: for Matt, he hits one on the way to the halfway point and the other as he was shutting down his car, while Sean makes his two hits on the way to the halfway point. Sean is also the fastest to finish at just over four minutes, while Matt finished in just under 30 minutes, due to having to wait for Jodi at the halfway point (Matt even trying to help her get there faster and trying to assist Jodi in finishing even after he was himself complete). Jodi herself managed only three hits.; Worst Performer: Andy and Allan were instructed by Andrew to count the number of obstacles that their respective wives would hit, but it only served to frustrate Henrietta and Karen—to the point that both demanded that Andrew eject their husbands from their cars as both contestants were passing each other. Both would finish in under an hour, though, with Karen finishing in 43:54 and Henrietta finishing in 51:01. Also notable was that Colin had trashed the course again (though he finished with the second-fastest time of 6:26) due to having lost to Sean in their "race."; Fastest Performer: Sean was the fastest, finishing in 4:16.; Slowest Performer: Even though neither Michael nor Shannon managed to make it to the middle of the course on the way to the halfway point after 40 minutes, forcing Andrew to teach the two how to adjust their vehicle with "S-bends," Jodi proves the slowest, finishing in over an hour, mainly due to Sam's 214 orders, 67 of which were wrong. For Shannon in particular, it had proven to be a valuable lesson.; In deliberation, the judges are split between Matt, Shannon and Jodi. In the end, Matt is the first graduate as it's clear that, without being distracted, he's a better driver. However, Andrew makes Matt promise to never drive distracted ever again and gives him a Bluetooth headset as a parting gift.
3	TBA	October 30, 2006
Road Signs: In a test of their road sign knowledge administered by Scott, it was found that many of the remaining candidates did not know even some of the most basic signs. Sean, however, did manage to get all seven signs correct, while Colin is the worst, getting only three signs right (he notably didn't even recognize the sign for 2-way traffic).; Driving in a Straight Line: The contestants had to drive forward up a ramp in a straight line, then reverse down the ramp in a straight line. Michael, Sean and Shannon finish without incident, while Henrietta had to repeatedly adjust when reversing. Jodi's car, however, goes off the side of the ramp. Colin's run was not shown, nor was Karen's.; Driving into a Wall: In this traditional challenge, the contestants are told by Scott to accelerate towards a wall of boxes, then brake, with the objective being not to hit them. Colin, Michael and Sean all stopped before the wall, though Colin pumped his brakes instead of skidded and Sean swerved to the side. Henrietta hit the boxes, while Jodi's run was not shown. For Karen, she had hit the boxes on her run, but when it was suggested that it is because of Scott's instruction (like it is with Allan in the passenger seat), a second run without Scott telling her when to stop led to a much worse result; Karen had smashed through the boxes and kept going. However, the biggest news to come out of the challenge was that Shannon was in fact four months pregnant, a fact that she told the judges after her run (as the judges reveal afterwards that they would not have let Shannon make her run had she told them about her pregnancy beforehand) and stopped well before the light turned red.; Packing Up: In this challenge, the contestants must properly pack items in a station wagon situated in a campsite and, after reversing out of the campsite, proceed forwards with another car blaring its horn behind them (in each run, Andrew will be driving this car). The drivers then find themselves between the car and an ambulance and must soon reverse to clear the way for the emergency vehicle to pass through (the chase car will also reverse to make room). For this challenge, drivers are paired with different nominators to see whether their overbearing husbands impact Henrietta's, Jodi's and Karen's driving abilities—Jodi is paired with Jeremy, Karen with Eric, Michael with Sam, Colin with Sara, Sean with Allan, Shannon with Andy and Henrietta with Melena.; Fastest Performer: Sean not only finishes with the fastest time of 2:55, but also manages to impress the experts when he is forced to repair the car (thinking that this was part of the challenge) when its battery cable came loose—a result from Colin's run immediately before his. Also notable is Shannon's run, where she chooses to pull over in reverse (meaning that she did not back up at all).; Slowest Performer: Henrietta and Melena, not knowing how to open the car's rear door, pack their items to leave virtually no visibility and, as a result, gets their car stuck as the ambulance nears. Of all the contestants who do finish, Jodi is by far the slowest at 27:12. However, Michael and Colin finish their runs with ticketable offenses—Michael because he had accidentally left a first aid kit on the roof of his car and forgot to pack it before starting his run and Colin from sitting on the car door with half his body outside of the car while trying to impress a clearly bemused Sara and not wearing his seat belt until the road rager "cop car" scares him to wear his seatbelt.; Driving Distracted: Because the challenge was so effective on Matt in the previous episode, the same challenge was done for the other contestants (Henrietta and Jodi being exempt). Here, the drivers had to drive three laps around a narrow track while putting a CD into their car stereo, eating a sandwich, drinking Gatorade, make a phone call and putting on lipstick. Sean (who hit 18 of the 45 obstacles) and Michael both stated that they wouldn't do these things while driving, while Shannon is grateful for the lesson due to her pregnancy. Colin refuses to acknowledge the lesson, but manages to knock fewer obstacles (five) than most of the others (Michael had the fewest with four). Karen, being a fourth-generation police wife, makes the note that she would report anyone who tried any of this to the police, whether it's her husband Allan or otherwise.; Canada's Worst Gas Station: In this musical chairs-like challenge, the seven drivers have to manage to find spaces in six pumps at a makeshift gas station with two entrances. At the start, three pumps are occupied and three are empty, with the three cars in occupied pumps serving as obstacles—one car (driven by Scott) will back into a parking stall before leaving, while the other two blocker cars will repeatedly leave and enter the same pump until their spaces are occupied. The seven cars are initially arranged in a line, with Karen and Henrietta on the outside, with Jodi and Michael next to them, while Sean has the initial disadvantage with his car in the centre, with Shannon and Colin on either side. Despite the initial disadvantage, Sean finds an opening, beating Jodi and Shannon to one entrance. Karen, against her husband's advice to secure one unoccupied pump, manages to secure another one. Sean would fill the space that Allan had pointed out, while Henrietta secures the last vacant pump. Scott's departure allows Shannon to secure a pump, though in leaving Henrietta is forced to move her car slightly. Jodi could not beat a blocker car to the pump, although she manages to take the pump vacated by the other blocker car (despite some parking trouble). Colin was left the odd man out after allowing Jodi to take the spot at a pump that he had already been sitting in when he saw how much trouble she was having with the exercise. After numerous block attempts against Colin from the third party drivers in the exercise, Michael finally managed to take the final spot.; Colin's behavior to Michael is brought up by an annoyed Andrew, but Colin just brushes it off, believing he deserved that spot as a reward for helping Jodi. Between challenges, more of Colin's behavior is revealed. Since the beginning of rehab, Colin has revealed that he uses his student card to get out of more tickets than he should have gotten (the total Colin said was 30) since he's a police foundations student. Also, despite studying to become a police officer, he says the following: "I don't think cops are the smartest people out there." This prompts Sgt. Cam to send Colin's home police service an e-mail containing Colin's quote above and pictures of his vehicle, which includes his license plate. In deliberation, Scott and Cam are up for graduating Karen since she's had the best performance in both the Camping Challenge and the Gas Station Challenge, as well as her in-car relationship with Allan has improved, with her becoming more assertive and more in control. Marcus and Juliana, however, believe Michael should graduate since he has better driving skills and Marcus brings up the fact Karen ran through the wall in the Wall Challenge (even though she stated she learned the lesson afterwards). With a 2-2 tie between the judges, Andrew is left with the deciding vote and decides that Karen is the newest graduate.
4	TBA	November 6, 2006
Water Tank Challenge: The drivers are taught gentle braking in this challenge, where 500 litres (130 US gal) of water are placed in a tank over a car. The objective of the challenge is to maneuver the car around an obstacle course (complete with several surprises), with jerky braking causing the water to overflow from the tank, soaking the occupants in the car. Although everyone was soaked with at least 200 litres (53 US gal) of water out of the tank, the worst came with Jodi's 375 litres (99 US gal) lost.; Navigating around CFB Borden: The drivers, in a navigation challenge, are given a list of 19 turns to be made around CFB Borden and up to 40 minutes to complete the task. Shannon finishes without any issues, also finishing the fastest at 20 minutes, with Jodi, Sean and Colin also managing to finish, despite having headed off-course (Sean and Colin had also sped in an effort to cut time and get back on course, with Colin not even taking notes, opting instead to record the directions on Jeremy's phone). Michael, although taking nine minutes to take meticulous notes on the 19 turns, fails to finish, while Henrietta's vision problems lead her to do the same.; Fastest Performer: Shannon performed the fastest at 20:00.; Slowest Performer: Of the drivers who finished this challenge without running out of time, Jodi performed the slowest at 37:03, asking Sam for advice 53 times during her run.; Swerve and Avoid: The drivers practice swerving on three varying surfaces: mud, gravel and coated asphalt. Jodi is convinced she failed all three, but actually passed the asphalt (the only driver to do so completely), while Shannon is the only driver to pass the mud portion. Shannon, however, fishtails horribly after accidentally putting too much gas when attempting to swerve on gravel, although Sean and Michael do so successfully. Henrietta fails all three tests, but worst of all was Colin: it appeared upon closer inspection that he intentionally failed all three courses—he swerved with only one hand on the wheel in mud, locked up his brakes on gravel and accelerated when told to brake on the asphalt, causing him to hit the boxes with enough force to shatter the car's windshield. Colin claims that he blacked out when he was close to the box wall and that this often happens to him at the wheel, something Jeremy sarcastically backs up.; Although he is convinced that he duped everyone with this stunt, Cam is not convinced and calls Colin's bluff by threatening to have his driving license put up for medical review over these "blackouts," causing Colin to change his story and claim that it was a one-off event. He then calls a friend and brags about his destroying the windshield in the previous challenge, completely unaware that all the other contestants and nominators, including Jeremy, overhear this and predict that he will either be named Canada's Worst Driver or be in the finale, while Colin arrogantly disagrees and claims that he will graduate this episode. The judges are stumped on whom to graduate due to the poor performances. After 30 minutes of deliberation, the experts come to a short list of Michael and Sean. Marcus and Scott think Sean should graduate, while Cam and Juliana think Michael should graduate. However, Andrew, who is left with the deciding vote for the second straight episode, has a completely different idea: In what would have been the graduation ceremony, Andrew announces that Colin would be getting his car key back (much to everyone's shock), but not before telling Colin that, because of his immaturity and refusal to take the lessons seriously, he is expelled from rehab. Andrew states that they're clearly not wasting their time on drivers who don't want to make a change, destroying the key with a grinder and handing what's left of the key to him. This marks the first time the series (including international versions) had someone removed from rehab. As Colin, Jeremy and his car are towed all the way back to his hometown, Andrew makes a final comment: "Let's all hope Colin loses his license before his life."
5	TBA	November 13, 2006
The Dirty Circle: The drivers have to reverse their car into a pile of mud, surrounded on all sides by a moat. While in the mud, they must perform a full 360° turn, then drive forwards out the way they came. Henrietta is the first to go and gets stuck in the moat on the way to the circle. After she is rescued, she manages to complete the course, but cannot see how someone could not reverse into the moat. Afterwards, Andrew takes Henrietta up on a suggestion that Henrietta would be in the seat next to Jodi and each driver would be in the passenger seat of the person going after them. Henrietta is able to help Jodi in her run, while Michael, with Jodi in the passenger seat, manages to turn 180° one way and 180° the other way before realizing that he had not in fact made a full 360°. Michael and Shannon argue in the car (although Shannon would make the fewest turns with 12), while Sean manages to finish the course the fastest (4:25).; Fastest Performer: Sean performed the fastest at 4:25.; Slowest Performer: Henrietta performed the slowest at 51:38.; Best Performer: Shannon was the only one to complete this challenge with the fewest turns needed, with 12.; Worst Performer: Henrietta did the worst, taking a 32-point turn and getting stuck in the mud.; Scavenger Hunt: In this nighttime navigational challenge that was used in the previous season, the contestants become the navigators while the nominators drive the car. Each driver must drive to a post office in Angus, Ontario to send a postcard, then to Utopia, get a flag, buy a pizza, retrieve a party bag and head to "Canada's Worst Party," held by Andrew. In an added twist, all of the cars begin with a flat tire, which Sean notices right away. Although Sean is the first to repair the flat tire (taking six minutes), Henrietta and Jodi reach the post office first and Sean eventually also reaches there thanks to meeting Henrietta (en route to Utopia) while trying to find his way to the post office. Shannon is the last to leave, but Michael is the last one to the post office, despite Sara being pulled over for speeding. Meanwhile, Henrietta manages to retrieve the flag and pizza while Jodi is patiently awaiting hers. Sean retrieves the party bag while waiting for the pizza, but gets lost on the way back to the pizza place. Jodi, Sean and Henrietta all manage to finish in 3:38, 3:46 and 3:55, respectively. As Michael waits for his pizza, Shannon comes in. Trying to avoid another flareup after what happened in the previous challenge, Michael decides to wait outside—a decision that ultimately proves costly, as Shannon steals Michael's pizza out of spite and finishes in 4:50, causing Michael and Eric to miss out on the party.; First to Arrive: Jodi was the first to arrive, although Sam gave Jodi the silent treatment after being called an idiot.; Last to Arrive: Shannon was the last to arrive. During her trip, Sara got pulled over for speeding, then Shannon stole Michael's pizza.; Fastest Performer: Jodi performed the fastest at 3:38.; Slowest Performer: Shannon performed the slowest at 4:50, although Michael missed out on the party.; Driving in Britain: The challenge is to drive an obstacle course using a manual transmission, right-hand drive Land Rover. Sean, due to his experience in driving stick shift, performs flawlessly to the point where some of the experts were impressed with his performance. Shannon and Henrietta also have experience driving stick shift, but neither is as successful—Henrietta manages to stall the engine 33 times. Jodi also has problems on her run, due to Sam insisting that the first gear position was actually the third gear. Michael learned a lot from the challenge, although he stalled the engine five times, rolled backwards and hurt himself looking over his left shoulder.; In the end, despite Sean's performance this episode, none of the experts were enthusiastic about graduating any of the contestants. Andrew pointed out that they still had the option to graduate no one, which was the final decision that was made: no graduation.
6	TBA	November 20, 2006
Extreme Off-Road: Aided by Sgt. Dan Andrews, the drivers have an off-road obstacle course challenge consisting of very steep ups and downs. While Shannon was ordered to go slow due to her pregnancy, Sean chose to drive conservatively, creating the impression to Sgt. Andrews that he is too slow. On the other hand, Henrietta and Michael both drive quickly. Henrietta, however, gets stuck going up a hill, while Michael believes he may be too slow to react. Jodi shows dramatic improvement and created the impression that she was experienced at driving off-road.; Blindfold Driving: In this challenge that was used in the previous season, drivers will help their blindfolded nominators drive a Chrysler New Yorker through an obstacle course, which contains a straightaway that they will have to drive at over 40 km/h. The nominators will be blindfolded with a bandanna. The drivers will also have 30 minutes to complete the course. Sean is again conservative in this challenge, telling Melena to stop 123 times and instructing her in great detail on the straightaway, which pays off as they finish without hitting anything and under the time limit. The same cannot be said about Michael—whose communication breaks down just prior to the straightaway—or Henrietta, whose driving causes Andy to go into a ditch during a straightaway run. Shannon hits 71 obstacles on the way to the finish, never once telling Sara to stop and adjust.; Individual Challenges: Henrietta, Michael and Jodi are taught by Juliana on how to do burnouts and donuts and each of them do reasonably well. Sam, in particular, is impressed by Jodi's performance. Sean races (and loses) against Juliana in a go-kart race, while Shannon installs a rear-facing baby seat in a car. Although Shannon gives up after accidentally installing the seat backwards, she realizes that she still has time to learn.; High-Speed Slalom: In this challenge, drivers must go at least 70 km/h while avoiding boxes that are thrown from a truck in front of them before going into a merge lane and out of the way of the truck. Henrietta fails to maintain speed on the first run and hits four boxes in her second. Jodi, more confident than ever, does so well on her run (hitting only two boxes) that she wants to do it again at 100 km/h-- a far cry from the first episode where it took her three tries to take a car up to 40 km/h. She celebrates her newfound confidence with more donuts. Michael fails his first run, but upon finding out Jodi did a 100 km/h run particularly well, he opts to go for another run at 90 km/h, but crashes merging off of the course. Sean is particularly spooked by the challenge, failing to maintain speed, although he finally manages to admit that slower is indeed safer.; In stark contrast to the last two episodes, the panel feel that everyone (barring only Henrietta) has shown enough improvement to be seriously considered for graduation. After a lengthy discussion, the panel unanimously agrees that Jodi is the most improved overall and becomes the next graduate, once again ensuring that there will not be three women in the finale. After Jodi leaves, Andrew then makes the surprise announcement that Sean is also graduating this episode, for finally seeing the error of his speeding habits, sending Shannon into the finale with Henrietta and Michael. Sean promises that he will always stick to the speed limit from now on and that he will buy his own go-kart to take up track racing in order to get his thrills. However, Andrew gives him and Melena a set of bumper stickers with the show's phone number on it in case he ever speeds in public again.
7	TBA	November 27, 2006
Trailer Parking: In this challenge, drivers have 60 minutes to reverse a truck with a trailer into a parking space in a campsite, while being assisted by their fellow contestants. Although Shannon loses her patience when her trailer repeatedly jackknives, she finishes the fastest in just over 39 minutes with 31 attempts. On the other hand, Michael (the only male nominee remaining after Sean graduated last episode) does not finish in time. Henrietta takes 42 attempts and finishes with 49 seconds to spare.; Fastest Performer: Shannon performed the fastest at 39:13.; Slowest Performer: Henrietta performed the slowest at 49:11.; Best Performer: Henrietta and Shannon were the only two people who passed this challenge, but Shannon doing slightly better.; Worst Performer: Michael did the worst, reversing 39 times, jackknifing 29 times and hitting eight trees, not to mention did not finish in time.; Mega-Challenge: This challenge consists of multiple parts, incorporating elements from every previous challenge, including high-speed driving, braking, reversal, driving off-road and navigating tight mazes. Shannon is forced to redo two different portions, while Michael fails four, including running over a cardboard copy of Andrew's "mother." Henrietta finishes the fastest at just over 21 minutes. However, all three drivers hit at least 30 stationary obstacles in the course.; Fastest Performer: Henrietta performed the fastest at 21:08.; Slowest Performer: Shannon performed the slowest at 34:28.; Best Performer: Henrietta and Shannon were the only two people who passed this challenge, but Henrietta doing slightly better.; Worst Performer: Michael did the worst, hitting 39 obstacles, including running over a cardboard copy of Andrew's "mother."; Road Test: Drivers must navigate a 27 km (17 mi) course involving 33 turns through Toronto in a state-of-the-art car (Smart Fortwo) known for maneuverability and high safety rating, with the beginning in front of what is now the official headquarters of Corus Entertainment on Queens Quay East and the ending on Richardson Street in front of what is now RBC Royal Bank. Shannon goes through the course with nine moving violations mostly resulting from stopping in the middle of intersections, such as Lower Jarvis Street and Lake Shore Boulevard East and Spadina Avenue and Nassau Street (committing two moving violations each—blocking the crosswalk and running both red lights in the former and attempting a U-Turn on a red light and blocking the crosswalk in the latter), Bay Street and Wellesley Street West, College Street and Huron Street, Bay Street and King Street West, Wellington Street West and John Street (on the north side of the CBC studios), Wellington Street West and Blue Jays Way (turning left from the center lane) that would not only total $990 in potential fines had she been caught, but also her license based solely on demerit points (she already had 12 coming in, two away from losing her license), although she completes the course without any major incidents in slightly under an hour, roughly 15 more minutes than the drive should ideally take. Henrietta goes off course, committing eight violations as she attempts to get back on course, such as stopping in the middle of Lower Jarvis Street and Lake Shore Boulevard East (the same intersection as Shannon), Church Street and Front Street East and Wellington Street East (although, as Andrew notes in the flashback episode prior to Canada's Worst Driver Ever when Henrietta was invited back, running the red light was semi-understandable), turning right onto Yonge Street while nearly going through the intersection and slowing down traffic after missing her turn onto Edward Street and running another red light while turning onto Dundas Street West from Bay Street (practically committing two moving violations at once when she turned left before 7:00pm). Almost halfway through, after being told to make a U-Turn on Queens Park and Charles Street West near the Royal Ontario Museum after missing her instruction to follow Queens Park Crescent around heading south, her stress goes past the breaking point to the point she emotionally breaks down and is instructed to pull over on Hoskin Avenue and, as a result, is unable to finish. Michael also gets lost—which, as Andrew notes, is nothing new, considering Michael got lost three different times—while navigating to the rehab centre, while navigating around CFB Borden to the point he didn't finish in time due to his getting constantly lost and while riding as a passenger in the backseat during the Scavenger Hunt Challenge when Shannon stole his pizza—and the fact that he fails to check a blind spot on Spadina Avenue and Oxford Street nearly leads to an accident when he nearly cuts off a driver, something Chris Ferguson actually did in Montreal near the end of his Road Test in the previous season that ultimately led to him being named the worst. Michael finishes with six moving violations mainly for the same issues as Shannon and Henrietta—running a red light turning onto Wellington Street East from Church Street (the same intersection as Henrietta) and making an illegal U-Turn on Spadina Avenue north of Spadina Crescent, among others, after he missed his U-Turn at the intersection of Spadina Avenue and Nassau Street (the same intersection as Shannon's fifth and sixth moving violations). Despite finishing with less violations than either Shannon or Henrietta committed, the violations that he did commit were far more serious than any either Shannon or Henrietta committed and would carry larger fines than theirs. As if that wasn't enough, it took him just over three hours to finish a drive that should have taken only around 45 minutes, something made even worse by the fact that the rush hour traffic had mostly cleared by the time he reached Bay Street and King Street West (the same intersection where Shannon committed her seventh moving violation).; In their final discussion, the experts immediately agree that while she still has some way to go, Shannon is definitely not Canada's Worst Driver, as, despite committing the most moving violations during her Road Test with nine, she improved the most out of the final three and learned to take responsibility for her actions. As for the remaining two, however, Scott and Markus judge Henrietta to be Canada's Worst Driver, feeling she made more mental errors than Michael, with Markus feeling that she's a walking time bomb who shouldn't drive at all, while Sgt. Cam and Juliana judge Michael as such, feeling that Henrietta would have had a better final drive had she actually been able to finish and that he was the worst in the Trailer Reversing Challenge, the Mega Challenge and was the closest of all three to an accident on the Road Test when he nearly cut off another driver. However, Andrew points out that even though Michael did hit his "mother" in the Mega Challenge and took over three hours to complete the Road Test despite committing the fewest moving violations with six, not to mention coming the closest to an accident, Henrietta didn't even get halfway through hers without quitting and that not only did she pass far fewer challenges in rehab than Michael, she often refused to take fault for her failures. The experts remain divided until the end, with Andrew once again left with the deciding vote, which swings in Michael's favour as, despite performing the worst in both the Trailer Reversing Challenge and the Mega Challenge, the fact that Henrietta quit the Road Test before making it halfway through, whereas Michael attacked the Road Test head-on despite taking over three hours to complete, means that Henrietta is Canada's Worst Driver and is the second person (first woman) to be awarded the trophy, while Michael therefore fails to graduate.
8	"147 Driving Don'ts"	December 4, 2006
In this season's recap episode, Andrew explains the specific don'ts of driving as illustrated by the contestants excluding Henrietta and Matt—Michael (analytical expert), Jodi (motivational expert), Colin (ethical expert), Sean (logical expert), Shannon (emotional expert) and Karen (backseat bullying expert).
