= Just 4 Fun (Australian TV series) =

Just 4 Fun was an Australian children's television show produced by the GTS/BKN television station, which broadcast throughout the Spencer Gulf and Broken Hill regions. The show contained live segments with a presenter interspersed with pre-recorded short cartoons, birthday calls and other TV shows such as The Wotsaname Show produced by Clifford Warne.

Just 4 Fun ran from February 1976 until January 1978 and screened after school on weekdays and was sometimes recorded in front of a live studio audience. In 1977 the station entered arrangements for recordings of the show to be delivered to closed networks in small mining towns such as Newman, Western Australia.

The show was hosted by Colin Pearce and Anne Storer and featured Pearce's ventriloquist puppets, Alexander, Jelly Been, Captain True-Blood-Has Been and Mr Sad.

Floor crew and directors included Owen Crocker, Kym Mavromatis, Malcolm Pollard, Neville Davis, Ian Steuart, Noel Schmidt, and David Carwana. Henry the birthday puppet was operated by 12-year-old Gavin Blieschke who also swept the floor and tidied cables as an after-school job. He stayed in the industry, becoming a news cameraman, documentary editor and production business owner.

Colin Pearce moved to (then) ADS7 to join the new Children's Production Unit and later became a professional conference speaker and published author.

Anne Storer continued in broadcasting with radio station management at South Australia's 5PI Port Pirie, and New South Wales' 2LM Lismore.
