= What's the Good Word? =

- Presented by: John Barton
- Country of origin: Canada
- Original language: English
- No. of seasons: 4

Production
- Production locations: BCTV Studios; Burnaby, British Columbia
- Running time: 30 minutes

Original release
- Network: CTV (Canada); Syndicated (US)
- Release: 1972 – 1976

What's the Good Word? is a Canadian word-based game show that aired on CTV network as a daily daytime series from 1972 to 1976. The host was John Barton. The show was shot at the BCTV Studios in Burnaby, British Columbia.

== Rules ==
Three teams of two players each competed over guessing the key word with a list of related clues. Play began with an introductory clue. For example, a set might begin with "This can either be a friend to man or an enemy." Clues would then be read while the timer clicked down. Clues for this sample set might be: WILD, RED, FLASH, GUN, ANTS, SIDE, TRUCK, HYDRANT, and finally FIGHTER (a maximum of ten clues would be revealed). The good word, of course, is FIRE. When a team rang in to answer, they would write their response down. If they were correct, they earned one point for every clue that was revealed. If they were incorrect, the team scored 11 points. If two or more teams rang in on the same clue, the host would then mention the order the teams signaled; the first team, if correct, would score one point for each revealed clue; the second team, if right, would get that same number plus one point, and if the third team rang in and was right, they would score that same number plus two points. If only two teams rang in and were both right, the third team would have to wait for two more clues to be revealed before they could ring in (they could answer verbally at that point). Whoever had the fewest points when time ran out won the game and would play a bonus game similar to regular play.
