= Words and Music (Canadian game show) =

Canadian television game show

- Genre: Game show
- Created by: Sammy Kaye
- Directed by: George McLagan
- Presented by: Jim Perry
- Narrated by: Nick Hollinrake
- Composer: George Fiala
- Country of origin: Canada

Production
- Executive producer: Pip Wedge
- Producer: George McLagan
- Running time: 30 minutes

Original release
- Network: CTV
- Release: September 1966 – September 1967

Words and Music is a Canadian television game show that aired over the CTV network during the 1966–1967 season. The show was created by bandleader Sammy Kaye and hosted by American television personality Jim Perry, who later went on to host Card Sharks and Sale of the Century in the 1970s and 1980s. The show was produced from the studios of CFCF-TV in Montreal and Perry regularly commuted from his home in New York to host the show.

== Gameplay ==
The object of the game was for contestants to guess a mystery subject which was the name of a person, place, or thing through a series of musical clues. The show's organist George Fiala played a medley of three songs, all of which shared a common word in their title. For example, the medley of songs might be Blue Moon, Blue Skies, and Blue Moon of Kentucky so the common word is blue. Once a contestant guessed the correct word, it was placed in a crossword puzzle on the game board. Another set of three songs was played and game play continued in the same manner with each new clue word placed on the crossword puzzle as it was guessed. All of the crossword puzzle words served as clues to the mystery subject. The first contestant to identify the subject won the game.

== Broadcast ==
Words and Music aired Monday-Friday from 3:00-3:30 PM over the CTV network and was host Jim Perry's second television game show. Perry called Words and Music "a very static show" and that it was probably too complex of a game for most viewers to follow. The show was cancelled after only one season. Perry then moved over to host his first American game show It's Your Move which aired in syndication during 1967.
