= Who Knows? (game show) =

- Genre: Panel quiz show
- Presented by: James Bannerman
- Country of origin: Canada
- Original language: English
- No. of seasons: 1

Production
- Producer: Vincent Tovell

Original release
- Network: CBC Television
- Release: 3 July – 25 September 1959

Who Knows? is a Canadian television panel game quiz show that aired on CBC Television in 1959.

== Premise ==
James Bannerman hosted this show in which a panel attempts to guess the identity of an artifact from a gallery or museum. Archaeologists Walter Kenyon and John Lunn of the Royal Ontario Museum were regular panelists who were joined by a third guest panelist. This concept was previously demonstrated during some episodes of Tabloid.

CBC broadcast a similar panel game quiz program, What on Earth, from 1971 to 1975.

== Scheduling ==
This half-hour series was broadcast on Fridays at 9 p.m. from 3 July to 25 September 1959.
