= What on Earth (Canadian game show) =

Canadian television series

- Genre: Panel game
- Presented by: Warren Davis
- Country of origin: Canada
- Original language: English
- No. of seasons: 4

Production
- Producer: Susan Murgatroyd
- Running time: 30 minutes

Original release
- Network: CBC Television
- Release: 4 January 1971 – 25 April 1975

What on Earth is a Canadian television panel game show and discussion program that aired on CBC Television from 1971 to 1975. It was based on the 1959 CBC game show Who Knows?

== Premise ==
The series featured items from the Royal Ontario Museum, the Ontario Science Centre and other facilities. These were brought before a panel who attempted to identify the objects. After the object's identity was guessed or revealed, it was the subject of further conversation by participants.

== Scheduling ==
This half-hour series was broadcast as follows (times in Eastern):

Day	Time	Season run	Notes
Monday	2:00 p.m.	4 January 1971	6 September 1971
Wednesday	7:30 p.m.	5 July 1972	13 September 1972
Monday	10:30 p.m.	28 May 1973	10 September 1973
Thu/Friday	2:00 p.m.	3 April 1975	18 April 1975
Monday to Friday	2:00 p.m.	21 April 1975	25 April 1975

Episodes were rebroadcast from July to September 1971, in June 1975 and from May to August 1977.
