= Just for Fun (Canadian game show) =

- Genre: Children's game show
- Written by: Serena Stone; Tony Zwig
- Directed by: Hedley Read
- Presented by: Margaret Pacsu (season 1); Valerie Elia (season 2); Larry Palef (season 2)
- Country of origin: Canada
- Original language: English
- No. of seasons: 2

Production
- Producer: Hedley Read

Original release
- Network: CBC Television
- Release: 16 December 1975 – 18 December 1976

Just For Fun is a Canadian children's game show that aired on CBC Television from 1975 to 1976.

== Premise ==
This game show required contestants to answer quiz questions on various subjects and to perform various stunts such as spinning hula hoops, bobbing for apples or keeping brooms in balance. Just For Fun was geared towards children in seventh grade.

== Scheduling ==
This half-hour series was broadcast Tuesdays at 5:00 p.m. (Eastern) from 16 December 1975 to 30 March 1976 in the first season, then was aired on Wednesdays at 4:30 p.m. for its second season from 15 September to 18 December 1976.
