= It's Your Move (game show) =

- 1977 promo card showing the set and host.
- Created by: Baer-Joelson Productions
- Directed by: Sidney M. Cohen
- Presented by: Paul Hanover (Canada, most of run); George Balcan (one season); Jim Perry (1967)
- Narrated by: Nick Hollinrake
- Country of origin: Canada

Production
- Executive producer: Don Forsyth
- Producer: Sidney M. Cohen
- Running time: 30 Minutes
- Production company: Champlain Productions

Original release
- Network: CTV (Canada); Syndicated (US)
- Release: 1964 – 1967
- Release: 1974 – 1979

It's Your Move is a Canadian charade-style game show originally produced in the mid-1960s. Created by Art Baer and Ben Joelson (who would later produce The Love Boat), the show's original host was Paul Hanover.

On the program, teams bid against each other as to who could act out an answer to their teammate in less time. Doing so scored one point which the other team scored if the acting team failed. Three points won a prize, and $15 if the team scored at least one point on their own. The winners chose one of the three words they scored and revealed either a merchandise item, up to $250 in cash, or dinner for two. Two games won the match, and five games won a grand prize such as a trip.

It's Your Move was broadcast on the CTV television network for its full run, but was shown in United States syndication from September 18 to December 15, 1967 with Jim Perry as host.

The series was revived by producer-director Sidney M. Cohen in Canada from 1974 to 1979.
