= Viewer's Choice Award for Lifestyle Host (Gemini Awards) =

The Viewer's Choice Award for Lifestyle Host is a Gemini Award.

== 2006 finalists ==
- Winner: Marilyn Denis, CityLine
- Jeff Douglas, Things That Move
- Mike Holmes, Holmes on Homes
- George Stroumboulopoulos, CBC News: The Hour
- Debbie Travis, Debbie Travis' Facelift

== Shortlist ==
- Theresa Albert-Rachford, Just One Bite
- Jeanne Beker, FashionTelevision
- Karen Bertelsen, Designer Superstar Challenge and Handyman Superstar Challenge
- Bob Blumer, The Surreal Gourmet and Thirst for Life
- Kevin Brauch, Superstar Chef Challenge and The Thirsty Traveler
- Kimberly Carroll, Take This House & Sell It!
- Andrika Lawren and Emmanuel Belliveau, My Parents' House
- Anna Olson, Sugar and Kitchen Equipped
- Candice Olson, Divine Design with Candice Olson
- Valerie Pringle, Valerie Pringle Has Left The Building
- Dina Pugliese, Muchmusic VJ Search: The Series
- Jay Purvis, Kitchen Equipped
- Lynda Reeves, House & Home with Lynda Reeves
- Sandi Richard, Fixing Dinner
- Sarah Richardson, Design Inc.
- Rebecca Rosenblat, Between the Sheets
- Wayne Rostad, On the Road Again
- Reg Sherrin, Country Canada
- Michael Smith, Chef at Home and Chef At Large
- Evan Solomon, Hot Type and CBC News: Sunday
- Mercedes Stephenson, The Underground Royal Commission Investigates
- Steve Paikin and Paula Todd, Studio 2
- Kristina Matisic & Anna Wallner, The Shopping Bags
- Scott Thompson, My Fabulous Gay Wedding
- Gail Vaz-Oxlade, Til Debt Do Us Part
- Andrew Younghusband, Canada's Worst Handyman and Canada's Worst Driver

== See also ==
- Canadian television awards
