= Superstar Challenge =

Canadian game show franchise

Superstar Challenge is a Canadian television game show franchise.

== Shows ==
- Designer Superstar Challenge a.k.a. Superstar Challenge (2003-2006), hosted by Karen Bertelsen winner Karen Sealy
- Handyman Superstar Challenge a.k.a. Superstar Handyman Challenge (2006-2010), hosted by Karen Bertelsen
  - All American Handyman (2010-2012), hosted by Molly Culver
  - Canada's Handyman Challenge (2012-2014), hosted by Jillian Harris and then Jennifer Robertson
- Superstar Chef Challenge (2005-2007), hosted by Kevin Brauch
- Superstar Hair Challenge (2006-2008), hosted by Karen Bertelsen
