= Jay Purvis =

Canadian television host (born 1976)

- Born: 1976 (age 49–50); Oakville, Ontario, Canada
- Occupations: TV presenter, carpenter, commercial diver
- Website: http://www.jaypurvis.net

Jay Purvis is a former model and television host. Purvis was a co-host of Kitchen Equipped, which was shown on Food Network Canada, Purvis also hosted HGTV. Purvis now hosts The Fix which airs on HGTV.

The Kitchen Equipped's resident carpenter's looks (Purvis) are compared to American Idol host Ryan Seacrest. Purvis is also compared to English chef Jamie Oliver due to Purvis's use of Brighton slang and public school accent.

== Biography ==
Purvis was born in Oakville, Ontario in 1976, but his mother and brother moved to Britain and later when he was 8 years to Israel. Jay is a former pupil of Claremont Preparatory School and then Sutton Valence Public School and grew up in rural Kent with his mother and brother Shawn (DJ and surfer). He rode his mother's horses helping her in her equestrian hobbies and also played good rugby and cricket for his schools. After Shawn had finished his A levels they all moved to Brighton, where he worked in the building renovation and carpentry world. At the age of 20, Jay hung up his tools for the catwalk after being taken on by a London agency. After modelling for three years he moved back to Canada, where he has since continued to frame houses and star in various shows.

Since being back in Canada, he has worked as a construction manager on numerous projects. After that, he started his own renovation and framing company. Through starting his own business, Jay gained invaluable knowledge about business and construction.

Jay got into television when he met a television producer Neil Davies who was looking for a contractor for the show Kitchen Equipped. He has also made appearances on various other television shows mostly on Home and Garden Television. He now hosts a show on HGTV called The Fix.

When not filming Purvis's television show, he worked as a commercial diver.

== Filmography ==
Television
Year	Show	Role	Notes
2005-2008	Kitchen Equipped	Co-host	
2005	Designer Superstar Challenge		Episode: "The Big Test"
2006	Handyman Superstar Challenge		
2008-???	The Fix	Co-Host	

== Awards ==
Jay Purvis has been nominated for Viewer's Choice Award for Lifestyle Host at the Gemini Awards.
