= Great Chocolate Showdown =

Canadian reality television series

- Genre: Food reality television
- Judges: Steven Hodge; Anna Olson; Cynthia Stroud
- Country of origin: Canada
- Original language: English
- No. of seasons: 4
- No. of episodes: 29

Production
- Running time: 44 minutes
- Production companies: Nikki Ray Media Agency; Corus Studios

Original release
- Network: Food Network
- Release: February 4, 2020 – October 7, 2023

Great Chocolate Showdown is a Canadian cooking competition television series that airs on Food Network themed around chocolate baking and confections. The show is carried in the United States by The CW Network.

The first season of the series officially premiered on February 4, 2020, with judges Steven Hodge, Anna Olson, and Cynthia Stroud. Episode 1, "The World Needs S'more People Like You", received a nomination for a Canadian Screen Award in the category of "Editing in a reality or competition program or series". The second season premiered on February 22, 2021, while the third season debuted on March 1, 2022, retaining the same cast of judges. In May 2022, the CW renewed the series for a fourth season, which premiered on August 5, 2023. It was canceled after four seasons.

The show features product placement from Purdy's Chocolates, which is the "official chocolate sponsor" of the show. Some challenges are presented by a representative of the company.

== Format ==
Each season begin with 10 amateur home bakers. After each episode, a contestant is eliminated, until a finale episode to determine the season winner. Episodes typically consist of two challenges: an initial "Technique Test" and a "Chocolate Elimination Challenge". Winners of the skills challenge receive either immunity from elimination, or an advantage in the elimination round. Season winners receive a grand prize of $50,000.

== Season 1 ==
=== Contestants ===
- Fadi Odeh – Austin, Texas
- Casey Hallen – Rye, New York
- Craig Taylor – Vancouver, British Columbia
- Andrew Keen – Falls Church, Virginia
- Renu Mathew – Olds, Alberta
- T. Lawrence-Simon – Somerville, Massachusetts
- Venessa Liang – Saskatoon, Saskatchewan
- Katie Rochin – Montreal, Quebec
- Trinity Andrew – Los Angeles, California
- Kathy Choffe — Aurora, Ontario

=== Episodes ===
No.	Title	Original release date
1	"The World Needs S'more People Like You"	February 4, 2020
Technique Test: Chocolate tempering. Won by Venessa; Fadi and Katie also received Immunity.; Elimination Challenge: Reinvent the S'more. Won by Casey. Craig, Andrew, Renu, and T were up for elimination. Craig was eliminated.
2	"Choc Full of Impressions"	February 11, 2020
Technique Test: Create chocolate impressions from everyday items. Won by Kathy. Andrew and Renu also received immunity.; Elimination Challenge: Create a fruit-inspired dessert. Won by T. Venessa, Trinity, and Katie were up for elimination. Katie was eliminated.
3	"Chocolate Panning, Spice & Everything Nice"	February 18, 2020
Technique Test: Chocolate panning (team challenge). Won by Fadi and Trinity.; Elimination Challenge: Pair chocolate with an aromatic herb or spice. Won by Renu. Kathy, Andrew, and T were up for elimination. Andrew was eliminated.
4	"Mirror, Mirror on the Glaze"	February 18, 2020
Technique Test: Create a mirror glaze cake. Won by Kathy and Casey.; Elimination Challenge: Create a dessert inspired by cheesecake and Sweet Georgia Browns. Challenge introduced by chocolatier Rachel McKinley from Purdy's Chocolates. Won by Fadi. Renu, Trinity, and Vanessa were up for elimination. Trinity was eliminated.
5	"I Have a Confection to Make"	March 2, 2020
Technique Test: Make a spectacle cake covered with a dozen chocolate bonbons. Won by Renu and Venessa.; Elimination Challenge: Reinvent the Black Forest Cake. Won by Kathy. Fadi, Casey, and T were up for elimination. Fadi was eliminated.
6	"Life is What you Bake it"	March 10, 2020
Technique Test: Chocolate flowers. Won by Renu (no immunity).; Elimination Challenge: Pair chocolate with a savory element. Won by T. Kathy and Renu were up for elimination. Kathy was eliminated.
7	"Don't Be Afraid to Take Whisks"	March 17, 2020
Technique Test: 3D Chocolate Molding. Won by Renu (no immunity).; Elimination Challenge: Make a dessert inspired by a Purdy's chocolate bar. Casey won the challenge and created the Peanut Butter Pretzel Bar with Purdy's. Venessa and Renu were up for elimination. Venessa was eliminated.
8	"The Finale: Good Things Come to Those Who Bake"	March 24, 2020
Final Challenge: Create a chocolate "bake shop" composed of a centerpiece, six chocolate confections, a set of bonbons, and a dessert inspired by the first dessert the baker presented in Episode 1. Each baker worked with a previously eliminated contestant as an assistant. Casey won the challenge, and became the season champion.

=== Elimination Table ===
Place	Team	Episodes							
Place	Team	1	2	3	4	5	6	7	8
1	Casey	WIN			SAFE^{†}	RISK		WIN (Note: Also won the opportunity to create a custom chocolate bar with Purdy's Chocolates.)	WINNER
2–3	Renu	RISK	SAFE	WIN	RISK		RISK^{†}	RISK^{†}	RUNNER-UP (Note: Neither contestant was defined in terms of 2nd or 3rd place during the finale.)
2–3	T	RISK	WIN	RISK		RISK	WIN		RUNNER-UP
4	Vanessa	SAFE^{†}	RISK		RISK	SAFE^{†}		ELIM	
5	Kathy		SAFE^{†}	RISK	SAFE^{†}	WIN	ELIM		
6	Fadi	SAFE		SAFE^{†}	WIN	ELIM			
7	Trinity		RISK	SAFE^{†}	ELIM				
8	Andrew	RISK	SAFE	ELIM					
9	Katie	SAFE	ELIM						
10	Craig	ELIM							

^{†}The baker(s) that won in the first round.

The baker won the Chocolate Elimination Challenge.
The baker was safe from elimination.
The baker was at risk of elimination after the Chocolate Elimination Challenge.
The baker lost the Chocolate Elimination Challenge and was eliminated from the competition.
The baker did not compete in the episode.

== Season 2 ==
=== Contestants ===
- Sheldon Taylor-Timothy, 30 – Rehabilitation Assistant and Bouncer, Toronto, Ontario
- Richard Martemucci, 56 – Retiree, Philadelphia, Pennsylvania
- Tam Truong, 42 – Real Estate Appraiser
- Latice Williams, 37 – Dental Office Manager, McKinney, Texas
- Jujhar Mann, 21 – Student, Surrey, British Columbia
- Raphael Nishida, 32 – Commercial Operations Manager
- Saudat (Sabby) Atta, 25 – IT Manager, Vancouver, British Columbia
- Abbey White, 34 – Retail Operations Specialist
- Atikah Mohamed, 35 – Campus Administrator, Toronto, Ontario
- Ginny Lepp, 59 – Civil Servant, Toronto, Ontario

=== Episodes ===
No.	Title	Original release date
1	"Do You Have What it Bakes?"	February 22, 2021
Technique Test: Competitors create their own favourite chocolate dessert, but must also feature at least 2 tempered chocolate garnishes.; Elimination Challenge: Each competitor in the elimination must make a chocolate dessert that best represents themselves. Abby was eliminated.
2	"Where There's a Whisk, There's a Way"	March 1, 2021
Technique Test: Hold a chocolate dessert by using a chocolate impression vessel.; Elimination Challenge: Each competitor in the elimination must make a chocolate dessert using two ingredients that each competitor selected randomly. Richard was eliminated.
3	"It's Time to Glaze the Bar"	March 8, 2021
Technique Test: Competitors are paired up to create a chocolate galaxy mirror glaze cake.; Elimination Challenge: Competitors have to identify the flavours of 6 mystery chocolates and then must select a complete ingredient box to use to create a chocolate dessert. Atikah was eliminated.
4	"Moved to Tiers"	March 15, 2021
Technique Test: Bakes 3 mini-cakes using the 3 techniques demonstrated by Cynthia Stroud.; Elimination Challenge: Create a modern take of a classic dessert that each competitor selects at random. Tam was eliminated.
5	"Donut Give Up"	March 22, 2021
Technique Test: Competitors are paired up to create a chocolate sculpture at least 18 inches tall that must hold 6 desserts.; Elimination Challenge: Bake a dozen gourmet donuts based on each competitor's own sweet memory. Raphael was eliminated.
6	"Bake It Till You Make it"	March 29, 2021
Technique Test: Create a dozen bonbons, with each bonbon containing 2 different fillings, as well as a dessert resembling a giant version of the bonbon.; Elimination Challenge: Create a dessert that shows chocolate in solid, liquid, and gas forms. Jujhar was eliminated.
7	"A Legend in the Baking"	April 5, 2021
Technique Test: Create a theatrical dessert that features a chocolate reveal.; Elimination Challenge: Create a chocolate dessert based on an interpretation of an art painting. Sabby was eliminated.
8	"You Bake My Dreams Come True"	April 12, 2021
Final Challenge: Each of the 3 finalists are asked to create a fantasy chocolate bakeshop which includes mille-feuille, charlotte russe, and battenberg cake. Three previously eliminated competitors serve as assistants to the finalists. Latice is the declared the winner of this season.

== Season 3 ==
=== Contestants ===
- Amber Horn, 43, Bartender, Las Vegas, Nevada
- Bri Brown, 33, Office Manager, Detroit, Michigan
- Connie Kazan, 42, Stay-at-home Mom, Dearborn, Michigan
- Evan Morgan-Newpher, 31, Zoo Guest Services Manager, Tulsa, Oklahoma
- Gavan Knox, 44, Stay-at-home Dad, Scarborough, Ontario
- Ian Frias, 28, Finance Manager, Saskatoon, Saskatchewan
- Lexi Christiansen, 24, Model, Vancouver, British Columbia
- Maile Crewdson, 35, Stay-at-home Mom, Maui, Hawaii
- Shyam Rethinavelu, 34, Fashion Stylist, San Francisco, California
- Vince Driver, 31, Freelance Artist, Atlanta, Georgia

=== Episodes ===
No.	Title	Original release date
1	"A Sweet Meet and Greet"	March 1, 2022
Technique Test: Replicate Steve Hodge's chocolate carousel and fill it with 6 mini desserts.; Elimination Challenge: Create a chocolate dessert inspired by the item picked by each competitor from the Cabinet of Curiosities. Vince was sent home.
2	"Mad About Choux"	March 8, 2022
Technique Test: Create and shape 3 playful choux desserts based on each competitor's preference.; Elimination Challenge: Create an ice cream sandwich using the baked good randomly selected by each competitor. Shyam was sent home.
3	"Veggies For Dessert"	March 15, 2022
Technique Test: Create a chocolate form studded by candy on the outside, while also containing salt water taffy and hard candy on the inside.; Elimination Challenge: Create a chocolate dessert featuring a vegetable randomly selected by each competitor. Ian was sent home.
4	"A History in the Baking"	March 22, 2022
Technique Test: Create hand-made chocolate pasta.; Elimination Challenge: Create a brunch dish inspired by a favourite dessert from each competitor's childhood with the brunch dish choice randomly selected by each competitor. Connie was sent home.
5	"Let's Par-Tea"	March 29, 2022
Technique Test: Create an anti-gravity cake with a theme that features chocolate.; Elimination Challenge: Create 2 chocolate tea party desserts using a tea type randomly selected by each competitor. Amber was sent home.
6	"Bakes in Full Bloom"	April 5, 2022
Technique Test: Create a work of art using two different flavours of truffles.; Elimination Challenge: Create a chocolate cake that showcases a flower picked at random by each competitor. Lexi was sent home.
7	"Haute Chocolate"	April 12, 2022
Technique Test: Create two different flavours of macarons as well as a macaronade based on a theme randomly selected by each competitor.; Elimination Challenge: Create a dessert inspired by an haute couture garment randomly selected by each competitor. Gavan was sent home.
8	"The Finale: Once Upon a Baker..."	April 19, 2022
Final Challenge: Each of the three finalists has four challenges: 1. Create a dessert as an Ode to a Loved One who initially inspired each competitor's love for baking, 2. Master a dessert that is the Judge's Choice 3. Create a playful and surprising Interactive Dessert 4. Create a Dazzling Showpiece. Each finalist is paired up with one of three previously eliminated competitors to serve as assistants.

== Season 4 ==
=== Contestants ===
- Timothy Eford, 35, Police Detective, Atlanta, Georgia
- Mike Casner, 38, Emergency Physician, Chicago, Illinois
- Charli Coakley, 43, Music Teacher, Jacksonville, North Carolina
- Ashlee Pridgen, 33, Medical Assistant, Baltimore, Maryland
- Jayln "Raplheal" Williams, 27, Retired U.S. Army Soldier, Fayetteville, North Carolina
- Meredith Bridges, 35, Stay-at-home Mom, Temple, Texas
- Donna Kim, 50, Props Builder, Langley, British Columbia
- Emma Lee Young, 23, Health Records Clerk, Coquitlam, British Columbia
- Ally Hrbachek, 30, Stay-at-home Mom, Saskatoon, Saskatchewan
- Kristen Washington, 23, Food Delivery Driver, Jackson, Mississippi

=== Episodes ===
No.	Title	Original release date	Viewers (millions)	Rating (18-49)
1	"Let the Games Begin"	August 5, 2023	0.260	0.03/0
Technique Test: Create a tempered chocolate Tic Tac Toe board with 4 mini desserts to represent the X's and O's.; Elimination Challenge: Create a cakescape with a minimum of 3 double layer cakes.
2	"Think Outside the Bar"	August 12, 2023	0.288	0.05/1
Technique Test: Create a three-dimensional chocolate bar containing nougat. The winner of this challenge receives the Golden Whisk.; Elimination Challenge: Create a dessert showcasing a harmonious pairing of chocolate and cheese.
3	"Pie Society"	August 19, 2023	0.304	0.05/1
Technique Test: Create a chocolatey pie featuring a creative, artfully decorated top.; Elimination Challenge: Create a chocolate dessert featuring one of these randomly selected basic taste sensations: salty, sour, bitter, savoury, spicy.
4	"Best Fruit Forward"	August 26, 2023	0.359	0.06/1
Technique Test: Create a pate de fruits to cover a cast chocolate mold as well as using it on a mini chocolate dessert.; Elimination Challenge: Create a set of 3 entremets that resemble a piece of fruit. The entremets must have the flavour of that fruit and chocolate.
5	"World of Flavour"	September 2, 2023	0.310	0.04/0
Technique Test: With the immunity off the table, the top six bakers pair up to build a magnificent meringue tower.; Elimination Challenge: After receiving a postcard from home, the bakers embark on a sweet journey and deliver a dessert showcasing an international ingredient.
6	"Lights, Camera, Chocolate!"	September 16, 2023	0.350	0.05/1
Technique Test: Create a dessert made of chocolate bread in the shape of a classic deli sandwich.; Elimination Challenge: Create a chocolate dessert based on a particular movie genre.
7	"Sweet Suspensions"	September 30, 2023	0.367	0.03/0
Technique Test: Create a chocolate trifle terrarium.; Elimination Challenge: Create a suspended cake made of three layers with a randomly selected theme.
8	"A Tale of Three Bakers"	October 7, 2023	0.391	0.08/1
Each of the three finalists has four challenges: 1. Create an elevated version of the very first dessert baked at the start of the season, 2. Create a tribute dessert dedicated to someone loved by each finalist, 3. Create a specific dessert chosen by the judges, 4. Create a Stunning Showpiece. Each finalist is paired up with one of three past champions from the previous 3 seasons to serve as assistants.

== International broadcasts ==
In January 2021, The CW picked up the series for broadcast in the United States. It premiered on the channel on January 29, 2022. The third season premiered on August 11, 2022. The fourth season premiered on August 5, 2023.

In Australia, it premiered on the Lifestyle Food channel on November 11, 2021. In Hong Kong the programme is aired on ViuTV6.

== See also ==
- Official website
- Great Chocolate Showdown on The CW
