= List of Bake with Anna Olson episodes =

This is the episode list of the cooking show Bake with Anna Olson which airs on Food Network Canada in Canada.

== Series overview ==
Season	Episodes	Originally released	
Season	Episodes	First released	Last released
1	40	April 12, 2012	August 23, 2012
2	20	September 6, 2015	November 8, 2015

== Episodes ==
=== Season 1 (2012) ===
No. overall	No. in season	Title	Directed by	Original release date
1	1	"Chocolate Cake"	Marc Simard	April 12, 2012
Olson demonstrates three classic chocolate cake recipes from the simple Devil's Food Cake to red velvet cake and a rich chocolate mousse cake.
2	2	"Pie Dough"	Marc Simard	April 12, 2012
Olson demonstrates how to make the perfect pie dough. Then, using that pie dough, she makes pecan butter tarts, pumpkin pie, coconut cream pie and apple cinnamon galettes.
3	3	"Chiffon Cake"	Marc Simard	April 19, 2012
Olson makes three light and airy chiffon cakes: the Angel food cake, mini lemon chiffon cakes with lemon glaze, and maple almond chiffon cakes served with four different garnishes reflecting the four seasons.
4	4	"Pastry Cream"	Marc Simard	April 19, 2012
Olson shows viewers how to make the pastry staple pastry cream and highlight it in strawberry cream tarts, a classic vanilla birthday cake with caramel pastry cream, apricot orange soufflés and mini cannolis.
5	5	"Cupcakes"	Marc Simard	April 26, 2012
Olson makes three types of the pop culture phenomenon that is cupcakes. Starting with the basic fluffy vanilla cupcakes, she then makes chocolate spice cupcakes with chocolate swirl frosting and dulce de leche "ice cream cone cupcakes", which are served inside an ice cream cone, instead of the traditional paper cup.
6	6	"Puff Pastry"	Marc Simard	April 26, 2012
Olson demonstrates how to make homemade puff pastries. She makes three individual puff pastry tarts: an apricot vol-au-vent, a salted caramel pear tart, and a s’mores tart. She then makes an elaborate chocolate hazelnut Napoleon, and she takes the leftover puff pastry scraps and makes three savoury hor d'oeuvres: pesto palmiers, sesame cheese straws and bite-size tapenade pockets.
7	7	"Cheesecake"	Marc Simard	May 3, 2012
Olson shows viewers how to make three different types of cheesecakes, including the New York cheesecake, individual chocolate swirl cheesecakes, and a key lime cheesecake. Finally, Olson takes the New York cheesecake and makes mini cheesecake pops.
8	8	"French Meringue"	Marc Simard	May 3, 2012
Olson shares her secrets on making the perfect meringue. She takes the meringue and highlights it in Birds' Nest, a passionfruit pavlova and an elegant hazelnut dacquoise torte. Finally, she makes little meringue mushrooms.
9	9	"Chocolate Ganache"	Marc Simard	May 10, 2012
Ganache is used as a base for truffles and fillings for tarts, cookies and cakes. Olson starts with a simple ganache and makes individual ganache tarts, followed by molten centre chocolate cakes, a fancy opera torte, and, finally, Olson makes chocolate truffles.
10	10	"Croissant Dough"	Marc Simard	May 10, 2012
Olson demonstrates the techniques behind making the French pastry by first creating the croissant dough and then making it into three different filled Croissants: cheese, almond and chocolate (pain au chocolat). Then she uses the croissants in a chocolate croissant bread pudding. Finally, she makes three types of mini croissants filled with peanut butter and banana, ham and gruyere, and salted toffee pecan.
11	11	"Crème Brûlée"	Marc Simard	May 17, 2012
Olson demonstrates the classic dessert of crème brûlée by making four types: a vanilla bean crème brûlée, a berry crème brûlée, a baked apple crème brûlée and an egg-free Iicewine crème brûlée.
12	12	"Pâte Sablé"	Marc Simard	May 17, 2012
In this episode, Olson shows viewers the basics on working with a tender cookie and tart dough, more commonly referred to in the baking world as pâte sablé. With that, she makes empire cookies, pumpkin crème brûlée tarts, a peach raspberry custard tart, and three types of icebox cookies: lemon icebox rounds, earl grey squares and chocolate pinwheels.
13	13	"Jelly Roll Cake"	Marc Simard	May 24, 2012
Olson makes different types of this sponge cake-based dessert known as jelly roll with the raspberry jelly roll, a heart-shaped tart lemon roulade, and flourless black forest roulade. She also uses the raspberry jelly roll to make a Charlotte Royale with a bavarian cream centre.
14	14	"Choux Paste"	Marc Simard	May 24, 2012
Olson creates pastries with homemade choux paste dough including crullers, profiteroles, and eclairs. Then she uses those profiteroles and transforms it into Gâteau St. Honoré and a cream puff tower known as a croquembouche.
15	15	"Squares"	Marc Simard	May 31, 2012
Olson shares her secrets on how to make her favourite dessert bars, which include fudge brownies, pumpkin swirl cheesecake squares, lemon meringue squares and rocky road cinema tortes.
16	16	"Strudel"	Marc Simard	May 31, 2012
In this episode, Olson demonstrates different types of strudels. She starts with a caramel apple jalousie, then individual cabernet pear and walnut strudels, and finally a cherry strudel.
17	17	"Sandwich Cookies"	Marc Simard	June 7, 2012
Olson prepares three different types of sandwich cookies: chocolate vanilla sandwich cookies, almond linzer cookies, and French macarons. Olson makes a macaron tower to showcase them.
18	18	"Nut Cakes"	Marc Simard	June 7, 2012
In this episode, Olson demonstrates cakes where nuts feature prominently in the recipe, including financiers, an Italian pine nut cake, and a Mont Blanc torte with a nut brittle as a garnish.
19	19	"Shortcake"	Marc Simard	June 14, 2012
Olson makes three variations of the classic dessert strawberry shortcake: the American version of "classic farmhouse strawberry shortcake", the British style "strawberries and cream sponge cake", and the French "fraisier torte". With the American version, she also makes strawberry shortcake trifles.
20	20	"Chocolate Pastry"	Marc Simard	June 14, 2012
Olson teaches viewers how to make basic chocolate pastry dough and turns it into three desserts including chocolate slice cookies, tarte au chocolat, and warm chocolate orange tarts.
21	21	"Brioche"	Marc Simard	June 21, 2012
In this episode, Olson demonstrates how to make brioche dough and creates desserts and hors d'oeuvres with it. She starts by creating a classic brioche, then a tarte tropézienne filled with vanilla custard, followed by the decadent chocolate hazelnut brioche cake, and finally, a variety of brioche tea sandwiches.
22	22	"Flourless Pies & Tarts"	Marc Simard	June 21, 2012
Olson makes several desserts that are gluten-free. First a raspberry clafoutis that replaces flour with ground almonds, then a flourless pear and cranberry pie and flourless French apple tart, both with flourless crusts. With the crust, Olson makes cheddar biscuits with preserves.
23	23	"Lady Fingers"	Marc Simard	June 28, 2012
Olson makes desserts that feature ladyfingers. She starts by making the basic ladyfinger recipe and dips the biscuits into chocolate for chocolate dipped ladyfingers. Next, she creates the classic Italian dessert Tiramisu, as well as a raspberry lemon torte. Finally, she changes up the ladyfinger batter and creates coconut almond madeleines.
24	24	"Upside Down Cake"	Marc Simard	June 28, 2012
Olson showcases different versions of the upside-down cake including the pineapple upside-down cake, lemon berry saucing cakes, and brown butter cranberry gingerbread cakes with brown butter caramel sauce. As a twist, she adds a meringue topping and an accompanying sauce to transform the lemon berry saucing cakes into lemon berry meringue cakes with a mixed berry sauce.
25	25	"Steamed Puddings"	Marc Simard	July 5, 2012
Olson demonstrates popular steamed puddings recipes. She starts by making English sticky toffee pudding, then the Asian-inspired steamed lemon soufflé cakes, and finally the traditional grand plum pudding, otherwise known as Christmas pudding in the UK.
26	26	"Pound Cake"	Marc Simard	July 5, 2012
In this episode, Olson demonstrates several pound cake recipes starting with the lemon pound cake, and then with individual marble Bundt cakes with ganache glaze. With the lemon pound cake recipe, she makes an elegant fondant-covered heart cake.
27	27	"Fruit Pies"	Marc Simard	July 12, 2012
Olson makes several pies with fruit fillings. She starts things off with her Blue Ribbon apple pie, then she makes a Mincemeat pie, as a showstopper piece, a blueberry lattice-top pie, and finally, individual frosted raspberry hand pies.
28	28	"Veggie Cakes"	Jennifer Fraser	July 12, 2012
Olson makes cakes and loaves with vegetables as a key ingredient, including classic zucchini loaf with orange, carrot cake with cream cheese frosting, rich beet chocolate cake with a fudgy frosting, and potato chocolate mini cupcakes topped with chocolate ganache.
29	29	"Chocolate Mousse"	Jennifer Fraser	July 19, 2012
Olson makes three chocolate mousse recipes using dark, milk, and white chocolate. First, a dark chocolate mousse, then a semi-frozen minted milk chocolate semifreddo, and finally a white chocolate cranberry mousse tart.
30	30	"Scones & Biscuits"	Marc Simard	July 19, 2012
Olson demonstrates how to make the British scone and its American cousin, the biscuit. She first makes buttermilk biscuits, followed by lemon cranberry scones with lemon glaze, and berry tarts with honey biscuit. Finally, using the basic biscuit recipe, she make two savoury spiral scones, one filled with garlic cream cheese and one with bacon and cheddar cheese.
31	31	"Drop Cookies"	Jennifer Fraser	July 26, 2012
Olson creates a variety of drop cookies and drop cookie-inspired desserts including chocolate chip cookies, oatmeal-raisin sandwich cookies, and warm peanut butter cookie cakes. She also makes "Anna Olson's ice cream sandwiches" with a homemade chocolate ice cream filling.
32	32	"Rolls & Buns"	Jennifer Fraser	July 26, 2012
Olson demonstrates recipes for rolls and buns starting with the Parker House roll, then fancy braided egg buns, and hot cross buns. She also teaches viewers how to make butter to go as an accompaniment to the rolls and buns.
33	33	"Doughnuts"	Unknown	August 2, 2012
Olson makes different types of doughnuts including apple fritters, raspberry jelly doughnuts, truffle-centred beignets, as well as a cake that is inspired by a Boston cream doughnut, the Boston cream pie.
34	34	"Lemon Curd"	Unknown	August 2, 2012
In this episode, Olson makes different desserts that showcase lemon curd. First, a British-style lemon curd whip with berries. Then, she makes the French bistro dessert, tarte au citron. Also, Olson makes the North American lemon meringue pie. Finally, Olson spirals the lemon curd into an ice cream to make lemon ripple ice cream.
35	35	"Shortbread Cookies"	Unknown	August 9, 2012
Shortbread is an old-fashioned style of cookie that is buttery and rich, and Olson starts out preparing a basic vanilla spritz shortbread by piping cookie dough through a cookie press. Then, she prepares traditional Scottish pan shortbread. For the ultimate application of shortbread, Anna creates chocolate raspberry Napoleons. And finally, Olson bakes decorated shortbread cut-outs.
36	36	"Sticky Buns"	Unknown	August 9, 2012
Sticky buns are a bakery staple, made from yeast dough and baked with sweet, sticky ingredients. Starting with cinnamon rolls, Olson shares her trade secrets on baking the perfect bun. She then advances the lesson with a British-style chelsea loaf, filled with both dried and candied fruit. This is followed by the dessert style banana walnut sticky buns with a white chocolate frosting. With day-old leftovers, Olson creates sticky bun French toast.
37	37	"Gingerbread"	Unknown	August 16, 2012
Olson starts by sharing her recipe for basic gingerbread cut-out cookies. Olson then prepares a moist and fragrant gingerbread cake. To create an elegant and formal dessert with gingerbread, Olson bakes a gingerbread berry layer cake with lemon frosting. And finally, Olson makes gingerbread place card tags.
38	38	"Coffee Cakes"	Unknown	August 16, 2012
Olson begins by making a sour cream pecan coffee cake. This cake has a crumbly streusel layer in the middle and on top. Next, Olson bakes a raspberry ricotta buckle. Then, Olson combines a butter tart with the simplicity of a coffee cake and creates a plated dessert: butter tart coffee cake. At the end, Olson showcases a coffee cake with actual coffee in it by baking some individual cappuccino cakes.
39	39	"Candied Orange Peel"	Unknown	August 23, 2012
Olson begins by candying orange peel and then turning it into a confection, a chocolate dipped orange peel. Next, she uses that same candied orange peel as a key ingredient in a fruitcake. Then, Olson creates a Southern Lane Cake. To finish things off, Olson creates her mom’s favourite Italian dessert, Candied Orange Cassatas.
40	40	"Focaccia"	Unknown	August 23, 2012
Olson begins with basic focaccia dough and makes rosemary-onion focaccia. Using the same dough, she creates cranberry chocolate focaccia twists. For an artisanal version of the bread, Olson bakes a potato parmesan focaccia. Finally, Olson shares some options for leftover focaccia with a lesson she calls "Croutons 101".

=== Season 2 (2015) ===
No. overall	No. in season	Title	Directed by	Original release date
41	1	"Biscotti"	Unknown	September 6, 2015
Biscotti are staple cookies in most coffee shops. Olson starts with cranberry-almond biscotti. Then she moves on to chocolate pistachio cantucci. Finally, Olson bakes up a biscotti ricotta cheesecake.
42	2	"Flourless Cakes"	Unknown	September 6, 2015
Cakes made without traditional wheat flour are some of the most delicious cakes in a baker’s kitchen. Olson begins by baking an Italian blood orange syrup cake using ground almonds and corn flour. She then makes a rich flourless chocolate torte. She finishes by making flourless mini vanilla cupcakes with buttercream frosting.
43	3	"Bagels & Pretzels"	Unknown	September 13, 2015
Fresh from the oven bagels and pretzels share the same common technique of being boiled before they are baked. Olson starts this episode with a recipe inspired by her grandmother, easy poppyseed bagel bites. Then she puts her own twist on an old favorite, soft pretzels. She rounds things off with bagels.
44	4	"Marzipan"	Unknown	September 13, 2015
Olson starts by sharing her recipe for homemade marzipan, which she turns into chocolate-dipped cutouts. Then she puts a twist on an old favorite with marzipan fruitcakes, and finishes up with a Battenberg cake, a pink and white checkboard cake covered in marzipan.
45	5	"Bars"	Unknown	September 20, 2015
Breakfast bars are a traditional food. Olson starts this episode with a healthy staple, the Granola bar. Then she steps things up with a distinctly Canadian treat, Nanaimo bar. To top things off, Olson shares her recipe and techniques for chocolate-covered caramel bars.
46	6	"Savoury Pies"	Unknown	September 20, 2015
Like fruit pies, savoury pies are an important part of a pastry chef’s repertoire. This episode showcases the dough recipe that best suits savoury fillings. Olson begins by making a basic crust and uses it as the base for her leek and gruyere quiche. Then she moves on to one of her favourites, the French-Canadian Tourtière. Olson finishes off with the most famous of all savoury pies, chicken pot pie, made with a flaky biscuit topping.
47	7	"Cake Cookies"	Unknown	September 27, 2015
Cake cookies are soft and moist like cake, but baked like a cookie. Olson kicks things off with one of her favorites, pfeffernüsse. Then she bakes up some pumpkin spice cookies and tops them with a cream cheese frosting. For the ultimate in cake cookies, Olson finishes by making chocolate peanut butter whoopie pies.
48	8	"Danishes"	Unknown	September 27, 2015
Danishes are a bakery staple and can make any breakfast extra special. Olson begins by making Danish pastry dough, and turns that into spiral raisin Danishes. Next, Olson gets more advanced in terms of shapes and flavours with cherry Danish twists and tropical fruit pinwheels. To round things out, Olson shares her recipe for an elegant filled Danish braid, filled with cream cheese and mixed dried fruits, and is glazed with icing and sweet sliced toasted almonds.
49	9	"Cobblers & Crisps"	Unknown	October 4, 2015
Cobblers and crisps are the comfort food of the dessert world. These desserts share a common characteristic of having fruit on the bottom and some sort of pastry on the top. Olson begins by baking a simple apple crisp. Then, Olson steps it up with a bumbleberry cobbler with a scone-like topping. Finally, Olson bakes a rhubarb crumble tart with a streusel topping and served with a laurel crème anglaise.
50	10	"Buttercream"	Unknown	October 4, 2015
Buttercream is the most popular of all frostings and can be made in a variety of styles to suit different types of cakes. Olson starts by baking lemon coconut cupcakes, topped with a basic fluffy buttercream. Then, she gets a bit more advanced with a pecan torte with a buttery, golden French buttercream. Finally, Olson caps things off with a chocolate berry cake with Buttercream#Italian meringue buttercream.
51	11	"Petit Fours"	Unknown	November 4, 2015
Petit fours are little French two-bite cakes. They can add a little something extra to any special occasion. Olsen starts by baking shell-shaped citrus Madeleines. Then she moves on to mini chocolate hazelnut friands. These are rich, dense little chocolate cakes. Olsen makes colorful fondant glazed petits fours and shares her recipe for making homemade fondant.
