= Bake with Anna Olson =

- The show's logobox.
- Genre: Cooking show
- Created by: Anna Olson; Shanna Albert
- Directed by: Marc Simard; Jennifer Fraser
- Presented by: Anna Olson
- Theme music composer: Asher Lenz; Stephen Skratt
- Country of origin: Canada
- Original language: English
- No. of seasons: 2
- No. of episodes: 60 (list of episodes)

Production
- Executive producer: Les Tomlin
- Cinematography: Andrew Baxter; Paul Kell
- Editors: Ryan Monteith (season 1); Jay Tipping, Kathryn Tomchishen, Colin Kish, Stephen George (season 2)
- Camera setup: Multi-camera
- Running time: 30 minutes (including commercials)
- Production company: Peace Point Entertainment Group

Original release
- Network: Food Network Canada
- Release: April 12, 2012 – November 5, 2015

Related
- Sugar

Bake with Anna Olson is a cooking show which focused on baking, hosted by USA-born Canadian pastry chef Anna Olson and was originally broadcast by Food Network Canada. It can be seen in Canada on Cooking Channel in syndication.

== Synopsis ==
Each episode acts as a lesson for a specific baking technique, and is divided into four parts. Olson first focuses on the foundation, teaching viewers a simple key recipe using the baking skill at a beginner's level. Next, a more complex recipe is shown building on the foundation skill. Then, a showcase recipe is demonstrated featuring an elaborate, restaurant-quality dessert or savoury baked good. Finally, the episode concludes by creating a new mini-recipe using elements of the first three recipes. This includes the instructions on making puff pastry, pies and chocolate cake with classic recipes for chocolate mousse cake, pecan pie, as well as new items such as savoury hor d'oeuvres. Also included are basic baking instructions such as using a whisk to fold egg whites or double-checking measuring spoons and cups for accuracy, to ensure each baking step is done properly.

== Series overview ==
Season	Episodes	Originally aired	
Season	Episodes	First aired	Last aired
1	40	April 12, 2012	August 23, 2012
2	20	September 6, 2015	November 8, 2015

== International syndication ==
Country / Region	Television Network
Romania	Euforia Lifestyle TV
Singapore	AFN
South Africa	The Home Network
United Kingdom	Food Network UK

== See also ==
- Sugar
