= The Decorating Adventures of Ambrose Price =

- Starring: Ambrose Price
- Country of origin: Canada
- No. of seasons: 2
- No. of episodes: 26

Production
- Running time: 30 minutes (per episode)

Original release
- Network: HGTV Canada
- Release: January 2009

The Decorating Adventures of Ambrose Price is a Canadian reality television series that aired on HGTV in Canada and Logo in the United States. The series stars Ambrose Price, an interior decorator from Fortune, Newfoundland and Labrador, in a series of design challenges.

Price was previously a contestant on HGTV's Designer Superstar Challenge in 2006. Although he did not win, that show's producers felt that he possessed star potential — Xtra!, Canada's LGBT newspaper, calls him "a down-home, straight-talking, flamboyantly gay Newfoundlander version of Martha Stewart" — and created a new series for him. Although Price is already a working interior designer, each episode of the show gives him a design challenge outside of his established skill set, such as flower arrangement, cake decorating, event planning, home staging or drapery design, and depicts the process of Price learning how to complete the task and having his work evaluated by professionals in the field.

The series debuted on HGTV in January 2009, and on Logo on October 5, 2009. Season 2 began to air in January 2011 in Canada.

Price won a Gemini Award for "Best Host in a Lifestyle Program" at the 2009 Gemini Awards. It was his first nomination and win.
