= The Ultimate W Expert Challenge =

- Starring: Karen Bertelsen
- Country of origin: Canada

Production
- Running time: 30 minutes

Original release
- Network: W Network (Canada)

The Ultimate W Expert Challenge is a three-part Canadian reality series produced by General Purpose Pictures that aired on W Network in Canada in summer 2009. Hosted by Karen Bertelsen, also the host of Playing House, the program took seven experts from all across Canada and made them compete in various challenges for the title of the Ultimate W Expert.

== Show format ==
Each episode revolves around one major challenge, hosted by Karen Bertlesen. The challenges included making a presentation to a boardroom full of children, hosting a divorce party for a fake couple played by actors and speaking in front of a mall crowd. Each challenge was judged by hosts of current W Shows. The guest judges included:

- Hina Khan & Dylan Marcel from Save Us from Our House
- Glenn Dixon & Glenn Peloso from Take This House and Sell It
- Candice Olson from Divine Design and Bruce Turner from Style by Jury

== Competitors ==
The Experts won an online competition held by the W Network in order to be eligible to compete for the show. The first season's competitors were:

- Preet Banerjee: Financial Expert
- Daniela Garritano: Interior Design Expert
- Dr. Cheryl Fraser: Relationship Expert
- Kristine Laing - Food and Nutrition Expert
- Eric Arrouze - Food Expert
- Jackson West - Interior Design Expert
- Mark Galati - Hair Stylist Expert

== Winner ==
Preet Banerjee was declared the winner of the Ultimate W Expert Challenge. He writes a daily blog with tips on how to save money.
