= Mandarin Restaurant =

Canadian all-you-can-eat buffet chain

Mandarin Restaurant Franchise Corporation
- Type: Private
- Industry: Restaurants
- Founded: 1979; 47 years ago
- Founders: James Chiu, George Chiu, Diana Chiu and K.C. Chang
- Headquarters: Brampton, Ontario, Canada
- Number of locations: 29
- Areas served: Southern Ontario (Greater Toronto Area, London, Niagara, Ottawa, Kingston, Windsor)
- Products: Food and drink
- Website: www.mandarinrestaurant.com

Mandarin Restaurant Franchise Corporation is a chain of all-you-can-eat Chinese-Canadian buffet restaurants. It was founded in 1979 and currently has its headquarters in Brampton, Ontario. The chain consists of licensed restaurants across Southern Ontario offering over 100 Chinese-Canadian buffet menu items, take-out, and delivery, as well as à-la-carte ordering. Each restaurant location employs about 100 people, making Mandarin an employer for approximately 2,500 people.

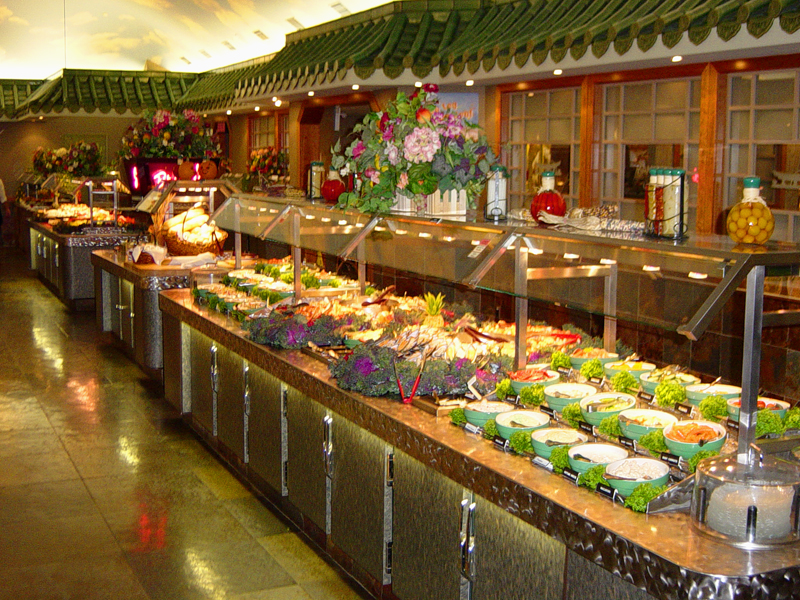
The interior of a typical Mandarin restaurant

== History ==
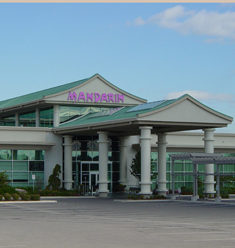
Mandarin Restaurant and Corporate Headquarters in Brampton

Mandarin was founded by James Chiu (1948–2026), George Chiu, K. C. Chang, and Diana Chiu, all of whom had many years of restaurant experience in Montreal and New York City. Together, they moved to Ontario in 1979 and purchased a small restaurant with Chinese-Canadian décor on Queen Street in Brampton, naming it "Mandarin".

At the time of purchase, Mandarin operated only as a small à-la-carte restaurant. The restaurant was later increased to three times its original size.

In 1987, Mandarin began to franchise by allowing its existing employees to become franchise partners. To become a franchisee, a candidate must have worked for at least one year at one of the company's restaurants and graduated from the Management Apprenticeship Program at the corporate headquarters. Franchisees are also asked to retire or move into an alternate role within the company after 20 years to make space for new talent.

As part of their 35th anniversary, Mandarin invited all Canadian citizens to a free buffet meal at any of their locations on Canada Day, July 1, 2014; this was repeated for their 40th anniversary on July 1, 2019.

Due to the COVID-19 pandemic in 2020, reopened Mandarin locations changed to an à la carte approach similar to dim sum. They are back to buffet as of November 2023.

== Community involvement ==
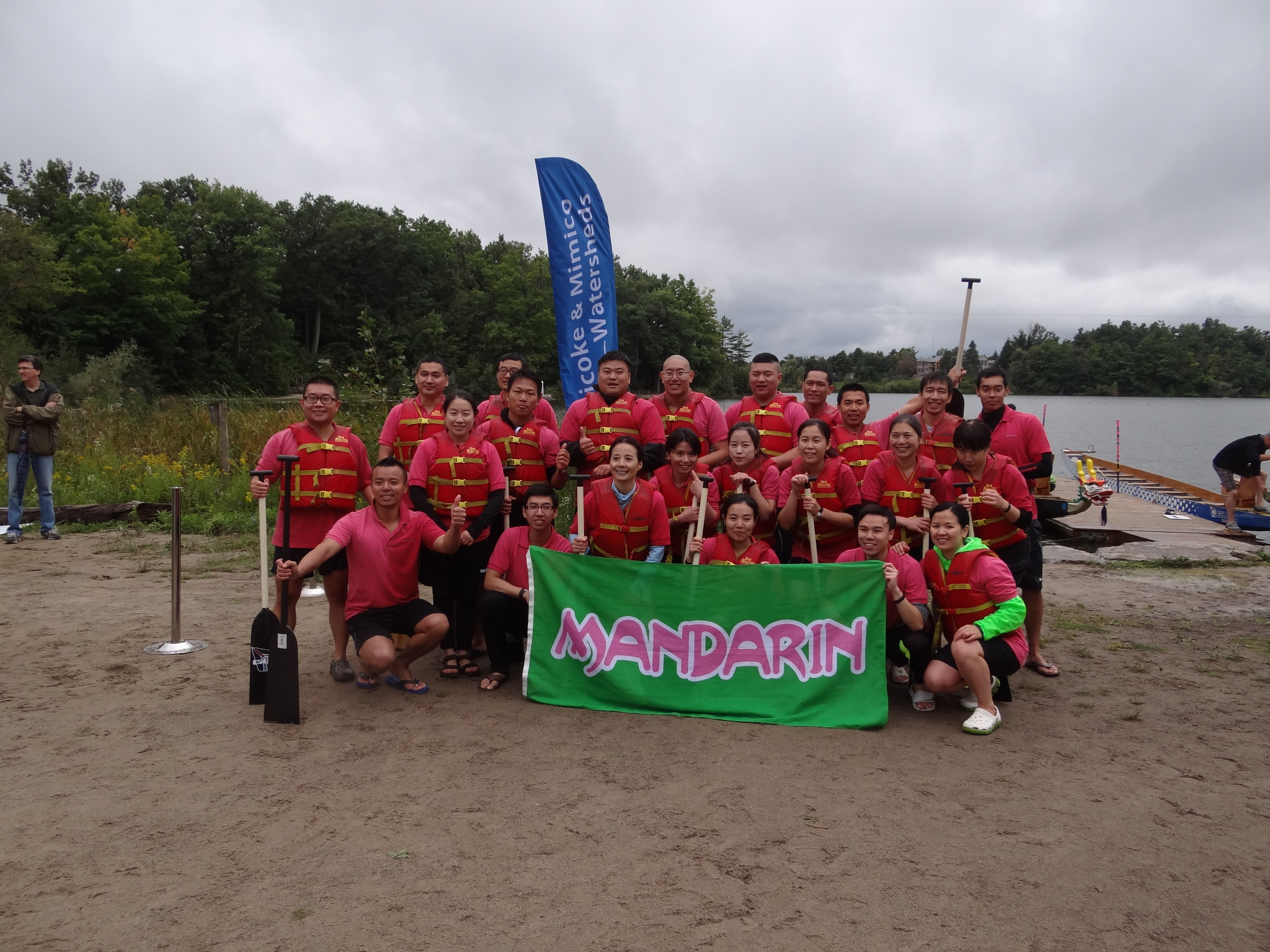
Mandarin team at the 2014 Heart Lake Dragon Boat Festival fundraising event in Brampton

Over the years, Mandarin has involved itself with various health care organizations and charitable groups in the community. Some of these include:

Mandarin became a major partner of the Multiple Sclerosis (MS) Society in 2013. As a result, the MS Walk was renamed in Ontario as the Mandarin MS Walk. As of 2019, there are over 50 Mandarin MS Walks across Ontario which have raised over 1 million in support of research and community support. Also in 2013, Mandarin became a major sponsor of the Giant Pandas and the Giant Panda Conservation Breeding Program at the Toronto Zoo. In addition to sponsoring this for a 5-year term, the first-ever Mandarin Express kiosk was opened, offering selected Mandarin dishes served to zoo guests.

Mandarin provides financial support to students through its Mandarin Scholarship program which directly supports post-secondary students across Ontario. These schools include: George Brown College, Humber College, Niagara College, Toronto Metropolitan University, University of Guelph, Algonquin College, Fanshawe College, Georgian College, Seneca College.

Mandarin was featured in Season 04 Episode 06 of Undercover Boss Canada on October 24, 2013.

The company committed a pledge payment of $1 million in 2007 supporting the Schulich Heart Centre capital expansion at Sunnybrook Health Sciences Centre.

== See also ==
- List of Chinese restaurants
- List of Canadian restaurant chains
