= Undercover Boss Canada =

Canadian reality TV show (2012-2013)

- Genre: Reality television
- Created by: Stephen Lambert
- Country of origin: Canada
- Original language: English
- No. of seasons: 4
- No. of episodes: 40

Production
- Running time: 55 minutes
- Production companies: Studio Lambert; Alliance Films; Corus Entertainment

Original release
- Network: W Network
- Release: February 2, 2012 – November 21, 2013

Related
- Undercover Boss (franchise)

Undercover Boss Canada is a Canadian reality television series, based on the British series of the same name. Each episode depicts a person who has a high management position at a major Canadian business, deciding to become undercover as an entry-level employee to discover the faults in the company. The first season consisted of 10 episodes, and ran from February 2, 2012, to April 5, 2012, on W Network. On April 3, 2012, W Network, Alliance, and Corus ordered an additional 30 episodes for the series, to be split into four new seasons. The second season also consisted of 10 episodes, and aired from September 6, 2012, to November 8, 2012. The show's third season contained 10 episodes, and aired from January 17, 2013, to March 21, 2013.

== Format ==
Undercover Boss Canada follows chief executives from major Canadian corporations as they work undercover alongside their entry-level employees. In each episode, an executive adopts a disguise and poses as a new recruit while performing standard company operations alongside staff members who are unaware of their true identity. Through this experience, the executives observe how corporate policies affect daily operations and employee morale, often using these insights to make orginizational changes at the conclusion of the episode.

== Episodes ==
=== Summary ===
Season	Episodes	Originally released	
Season	Episodes	First released	Last released
1	10	February 2, 2012	April 5, 2012
2	10	September 6, 2012	November 8, 2012
3	10	January 17, 2013	March 21, 2013
4	10	September 19, 2013	November 21, 2013

=== Season 1: 2012 ===
No. overall	No. in season	Title	"Boss"	Original release date
1	1	"Toronto Zoo"	John Tracogna	February 2, 2012
As the new CEO of the Toronto Zoo, John Tracogna has a lot of beasts to herd. The zoo's livelihood relies on private investments and grants, but the city threatening a sale following $1 million in budget cuts has donors closing their wallets. Between press fiascos over separated gay penguins and imported giant pandas costing a fortune, John goes undercover to get a sense of employee morale and maintain perspective on what is important – conservation, breeding endangered species and making sure the daily tonne of animal food gets distributed properly.
2	2	"Pizza Pizza"	Paul Goddard	February 9, 2012
Paul Goddard has big shoes to fill as recently appointed CEO of Canada's largest and most successful pizza chain, Pizza Pizza. His late father-in-law Michael Overs – who founded the business 45 years ago – turned the brand into a multi-million dollar company. Now Paul has taken over in this highly competitive industry, but his background is in the oil industry and IT – not pizza. Paul goes undercover to get a slice of the action and the front line information he needs to run the company successfully. From the dough factory floor onto the delivery routes in Edmonton and Toronto, Paul gains a fresh perspective on Pizza Pizza – and the challenges the company faces day-to-day.
3	3	"Toronto Transit Commission"	Karen Stintz	February 16, 2012
City Councillor and Toronto Transit Commission Chair Karen Stintz goes undercover inside the country's largest mass transit system to get her hands dirty with some of the toughest and grittiest jobs.
4	4	"1-800-GOT-JUNK?"	Brian Scudamore	February 23, 2012
Just over 20 years ago, Brian Scudamore had a vision for 1 - 800 - GOT - JUNK ?. Since then, he has revolutionized customer service in the junk removal business, having built the largest junk removal franchise in the world. Brian was once a junk remover himself and knows the ropes, but now he goes undercover to really understand how the franchisees in his business work. With recent motivation to grow his one-day painting service, he needs new ammunition and a better understanding on how to improve customer service and marketing. Getting down and dirty on the job, Brian collects much more than junk – including new inspiration from employees along the way.
5	5	"Cineplex Entertainment"	Ellis Jacob	March 1, 2012
Toronto headquartered Cineplex theaters plays host to 70 million guests annually. CEO Ellis Jacob has had wild success in the theatre business, but the digital revolution has left audiences with a myriad of viewing options. As such, Cineplex is well aware they had better take nothing for granted. Ellis goes undercover in theatres serving popcorn and selling tickets in hopes to improve efficiency and innovation in order keep the good times rolling. But how will this media mogul perform on the ground floor away from his spreadsheets and head office corner suite?
6	6	"Molson"	Dave Perkins	March 8, 2012
With Molson CEO Dave Perkins too recognizable for the job, Chief Legal Officer Kelly Brown goes undercover in the Molson Coors Breweries across Canada. A new mother, Kelly leaves her young daughter at home, traveling from east to west to brave the production line and overnight shifts. Working in a male-dominated industry, Kelly connects with other women in the breweries to see what they face on the job – and she is surprised by what she learns. As well, facing public criticism from beer lovers of Molson's “industrial” taste, Kelly gets into the hops and testing at the Creemore plant. She also checks if corners are being cut safety-wise. She discovers employee dedication she can raise a glass to, and makes some emotional connections along the way.
7	7	"Second Cup"	Stacey Mowbray	March 15, 2012
Under CEO Stacey Mowbray's direction, Second Cup is gunning to reverse the losses of the last decade and take on the intense coffee chain competition as Canadians’ cup of choice. The challenge is steering a new course in the franchise system where change can't be mandated, but rather inspired. With bold competition and an evolving brand, Second Cup needs to make its mark as a company that cares and provides the best cafe experience. Stacey gets brewing with her frontline employees – her most valuable asset – and shows them what this really means.
8	8	"GoodLife Fitness"	Jane Riddell	March 22, 2012
COO of GoodLife Fitness Jane Riddell enjoys making a difference in people's lives through fitness. From coast to coast, one in every 45 Canadians is a GoodLife member. Creativity and new programs for member and employee retention are necessary to be competitive in the gym crowd. Without this, profitability could flounder. Jane immerses herself in the gym scene to gain new insight. As an undercover boss, she works as a Zumba instructor trainee, a maintenance worker and salesperson, whose competitive skills may not be up to snuff. Later, when she witnesses employee dedication wavering, she must exercise her covert operation skills.
9	9	"Skyline International Development"	Michael Sneyd	March 29, 2012
Michael Sneyd, CEO of Skyline International Development, is new to the company and has been tasked by Skyline's investors to take business to the next level creating a coast-to-coast hotel group. During one of the most severe downturns the hospitality industry has experienced in decades, Skyline is relying on its employees to provide superior guest experiences in resorts that need updating and investment. Michael knows he also needs to cut costs – and that means getting creative. His goal in going undercover is to engage front line employees and get their ideas up the chain's fast-growing infrastructure. If all goes to plan, the sky is the limit.
10	10	"FedEx"	Lisa Lisson	April 5, 2012
In the season one finale, Lisa Lisson, CEO of FedEx Express Canada, knows how to deliver. But as a single mother with a high stress job, she also believes in maintaining a healthy work-life balance. FedEx is consistently listed as one of the top 50 best Canadian employers and Lisa knows to be number one, the FedEx work environment needs to improve. She believes that when employees are engaged, committed and motivated by their leaders and work culture, they are driven to contribute to the company's well-being. Lisa goes undercover to ensure employees have the tools they need to succeed - and that FedEx not only delivers to its customers, but also to its valuable employees.

=== Season 2: 2012 ===
On April 3, 2012, the W Network ordered an additional 30 episodes. The second season, which contained 10 episodes, aired from September 6, 2012, to November 8, 2012.

No. overall	No. in season	Title	"Boss"	Original release date
11	1	"Home Hardware"	Terry Davis	September 6, 2012
The executive Vice President and Chief Operating Officer Terry Davis has been with Home Hardware for 42 years. Now he's returning to his roots working in the warehouse and making his own improvements. But will the disguised worker walk off the job after a sweaty shift of hauling drywall?
12	2	"Canlan Ice Sports Corporation"	Joey St-Aubin	September 13, 2012
Undercover Boss Canada takes a look at what really goes into creating the nation's favourite pastime – Hockey. Canlan Ice Sports Corp is the largest private sector owner/operator of ice sports & entertainment facilities in North America and believes its role is to nurture future NHL stars. CEO Joey St-Aubin admits their prices are higher than local municipal rinks, but believes his company offers a premium service and better ice quality. In an effort to win back cost-conscious customers, he adopts a brand new identity, allowing him to secretly survey his rinks, bars and restaurants and find out how they're really performing. Ice Queen Ramona coldly tells him to quit complaining when he struggles to get the rinks ready for play-off, and there's so much dog poop to pick up at one facility, there's no time for lunch. In the end, what he discovers leads to real frontline changes that make life easier for staff and also go down well with customers.
13	3	"Purdy's Chocolates"	Kriston Dean	September 20, 2012
Chocolates are a sinful indulgence, but while Kriston Dean has the nation's most delicious job, hitting sales targets is a tough nut to crack. Purdy's dominates the west, but is struggling to make an impression elsewhere. To boost sales, the Chocolate Queen travels the country, working in disguise in her own stores and factory floors. But Kriston is nearly busted by a suspicious staffer, and it's not long before she has a chocolate meltdown and brings an entire assembly line to a gooey halt. When her fake tattoo is wiped off and wig whipped away at the end of the week, she meets the people she worked with again. Her true identity is revealed, and they discover she's a boss with a soft center. Devoted worker Kathy, who juggles hectic factory floor shifts while looking after a sick husband and raising a grandson, is full of teary-eyed appreciation when Kriston decides it's time to make her life easier.
14	4	"Cooke Aquaculture"	Glenn Cooke	September 27, 2012
This episode nets an exclusive “behind-the-scenes” look at what it really takes to get fish on our dinner plates. Cooke Aquaculture is the Canadian leader in salmon farming, but they operate within an aggressive global market, and have to maintain production to safeguard jobs in Atlantic Canada. In some communities, they are responsible for one out of every two pay cheques. CEO Glenn Cooke gets a fresh head of hair and a new identity, so he can join his own workers on the frontline. As he struggles through the work week, he causes chaos at his fish processing plant and creates costly delays. All is forgiven, though, when he gets a chance to make good and reveal his true identity at the end of it all. He summons the workers he met to the company's remote retreat, The Big Hole Fishing Lodge. Mom Elvie, who lost her husband after a long illness, is in tears when family man Glenn makes her vacation dream come true, and hatchery technician Jean gets the surprise of her life when he announces plans to reunite her 15 brothers and sisters for a long-awaited get-together.
15	5	"Victorian Order of Nurses"	Judith Shamian	October 4, 2012
The Healthcare system is at breaking point, as baby boomers age and put increasing demand on services. The Victorian Order of Nurses takes the pressure off hospitals by providing care for people in their own homes. It was once a unique service, but now hundreds of rival companies compete for cash and customers. Judith Shamian says unless she takes drastic action, the Canadian institution she runs will be consigned to the history books. However, her decision to work in disguise so she can see for herself the pressure nurses are under in life and death situations is riddled with risk. Just hours into her first day on the job, an unexpected encounter throws her undercover operation into chaos. At the end of the week, an exhausted Judith resumes her role as CEO, and rewards the workers who showed such kindness and dedication. A couple with a heart-breaking story gets an emotional double surprise. Their reward will benefit an entire community.
16	6	"Tervita"	Fory Musser	October 11, 2012
Tervita specializes in environmental clean-up for Western Canada's booming energy and mining industries. The company has ambitious growth plans to attract workers. It doesn't take long for Fory Musser, VP of Strategy, to discover why when he quits his cushy office for a work week on the frontline – his company specializes in doing some of the nation's dirtiest, smelliest jobs. He joins Julie, who sorts through tons of dangerous, nasty waste every day, and Etta, a former social worker who used to repair families but gets more job satisfaction destroying things, as Tervita's top car crusher. When Fory's undercover assignment is up, he returns to HQ and summons the five workers he met to a meeting, where he dishes out some of the season's biggest rewards.
17	7	"Premiere Van Lines"	Kirsten Flynn	October 18, 2012
Moving is officially the second most stressful event we go through in life – trumped only by the death of a loved one. Established, professional moving companies are being squeezed by low-cost rivals and unregulated fly-by-nights. “They give the industry a bad name,” says Kirsten Flynn, the boss of Premiere Van Lines. She's a woman with a formidable reputation. Her own staff call her “Frugal Flynn” because she watches the pennies to protect profits. But will she loosen the purse strings after traveling the country and seeing firsthand how her own staff are missing basic tools? It's doesn't take long before the disguised boss is overwhelmed and literally can't deliver the goods. A storage worker breaks down when he reveals how, years ago, a horrific accident cut short his career at the wheel.
18	8	"PJ's Pets and Pets Unlimited"	Margaret Kordas	October 25, 2012
Canadians spend nearly $9 billion dollars a year on their pets – that's more than we spend on kids’ toys, designer shoes and dental plans! PJ's Pets/Pets Unlimited is one of the nation's oldest and respected pet store chains, but the company has a new President in place, and she's prepared to rattle a few cages. Margaret Kordas steps out of her high heels and spends a week working in her own stores. Throughout her journey, she comes to appreciate the level of knowledge and competence the retail staff displays. While in disguise she also discovers a few costly inefficiencies and wasted opportunities – and confronts a personal fear of spiders! At the end of the week, she slips back into her designer suit and heels to reunite with the passionate people she worked with. Her true identity is revealed and those workers are rewarded for their hard work and honesty.
19	9	"T & T Supermarket"	Tina Lee	November 1, 2012
For nearly 20 years, T&T Supermarket Inc dominated sales, but now, the competition is heating up with more and more companies fighting it out for the dollars consumers are spending on ethnic food. Executive Director, Strategy & Operations Tina Lee goes undercover, struggling to bake Asian delicacies and wrestling with live seafood, in order to secretly search for ways to attract more customers to Canada's largest Asian supermarket chain. While working undercover, the first time mom-to-be discovers her employees offer food for thought and a fresh perspective.
20	10	"East Side Mario's"	John Rothschild	November 8, 2012
John Rothschild is the CEO of Prime Restaurants Inc., which has over 140 casual dining restaurants in Canada and the U.S., including East Side Mario's. He goes undercover in the restaurant in a bid to check the front lines of the business. With the explosion of family dining restaurants, East Side Mario's is fighting for customers and Rothschild is worried that his brand is starting to look dated. But his own staff and customers have surprising solutions to reviving business, and when he reunites with the people he worked alongside, he makes a big difference to both their personal and work lives.

=== Season 3: 2013 ===
The show's third season, which contains 10 episodes, aired from January 17, 2013, to March 21, 2013.

No. overall	No. in season	Title	"Boss"	Original release date
21	1	"Wild Wing"	Rick Smiciklas	January 17, 2013
Chicken wings were originally sold in bars as a way to boost booze sales. Former mud wrestler, fight promoter, and man-about-town Rick Smiciklas jumped on the beer and wings wagon in 1999. Now he heads a franchise operation with over 100 locations, but the company has had a roller-coaster history with losses reputed to be running into millions of dollars. Recently, Smiciklas cleaned house, thinned corporate operations, and announced the dawn of a new era. But revealing plans to work in disguise in his own restaurants, so he can make other fixes to his franchises, makes his teen daughter worried. She thinks he's too feisty to keep calm and complete his undercover work week. It's an ominous warning, because it's not long before the Undercover Boss is on the rampage, blowing his cover and getting into explosive confrontations about business operations. Will the Wild Wing man regain his composure in time to thank and reward his staff?
22	2	"Orkin Canada"	Gary Muldoon	January 24, 2013
The nation's pest control industry generates $600 million in annual revenue, and Orkin Canada is the nation's leader. But it's not just rodents they're having to keep under control – it's outside rivals, ready to bite a chunk out of their market share. President Gary Muldoon is anxious to ensure the company is playing to its strengths, and that staff have good customer service skills as well as professional know-how. But when he's on the road, working in disguise under an assumed identity, he soon discovers that staff lack some of the tools to make their working life easier, and that good hard workers are over-scheduled and pushed to their limit. When his working week is over, he calls the staff he met to HQ… and his touching words leave one worker in tears…
23	3	"Clark Builders"	Andy Clark	January 31, 2013
The construction industry is booming. Even in this turbulent economy, it provides work for 1 in every 16 Canadians. Clark Builders is responsible for creating commercial and industrial buildings. It was launched in 1974, back in Yellowknife, with just a dozen employees. Today it is a $600 million a year powerhouse, headquartered in Edmonton, Alberta, with a nearly thousand-strong workforce throughout the Western provinces. Andy Clark, the Executive Chairman and Company Founder, believes that every time the company takes on a project, it has an opportunity to strengthen its reputation - or ruin it. He says: "My name may be on the door, but it's the guys on site who make the company." Keen to find out what those guys think of the company he runs, and to discover ways to improve productivity, he puts on a tool belt for the first time in 30 years and joins his building site crews. But what one worker says leaves him so distraught, his entire undercover mission is jeopardized when he takes off his disguise and reveals that's he's not the new guy in town – he's the boss!
24	4	"Beck Taxi"	Gail Souter and Kristine Hubbard	February 7, 2013
Life on the road takes its toll when the bosses of North America's biggest independent cabbies, Beck Taxi, work in disguise. General Manager Gail Souter and Operations Manager Kristine Hubbard are mother and daughter. Together, they run a business that has takes 15 million passengers a year to where they want to go. But with tough City Council regulations and high overheads, drivers are struggling to make a living.
25	5	"Bellstar Hotels & Resorts"	Ed Romanowski	February 14, 2013
There's been a boom in boutique hotels across Canada and our taste for more intimate, and unique stay experiences has affected the way the resort industry does business. Bellstar Hotel and Resorts is one of the rare Canadian companies doing well in this niche market, despite the volatile economy. In less than ten years the company has quadrupled in size and is now seen as a major player in the Canadian West. The CEO – a former national long-distance track star – is now pushing for Bellstar to become one of the top resort companies in North America. But when Ed Romanowski joins housekeeping staff, he struggles to keep up and makes startling discoveries about the business he's running.
26	6	"Lush Cosmetics"	Brandi Halls	February 21, 2013
Brandi Halls as a top job at cosmetics giant Lush. But she's cut down to size when she joins the frontline to work in disguise and find ways to improve the company. It's not long before the secret Director of Brand Communications throws the factory into chaos - not to mention overtime.
27	7	"Mr. Lube"	Stuart Suls	February 28, 2013
Canadians spend over $1.5 billion a year on car maintenance. Mr. Lube has built its reputation on quick oil changes, but as it expanding its slate of services, are staff keeping up? When CEO Stuart Suls works in disguise, he discovers he can't even install windscreen wipers, let alone deal with what's under the hood.
28	8	"Freshii"	Matthew Corrin	March 7, 2013
Freshii has captured the market in healthier, fresh, fast food. Boss Matthew Corrin opened his first store in 2005 and now he has 80, around the world. But when he dares to work undercover in his own Canadian franchises, he makes surprising discoveries. One worker literally rubs salt in his wounds when he struggles to cut up tomatoes.
29	9	"Pizza Nova"	Domenic Primucci	March 14, 2013
Pizza is a $40 billion business in North America. Canadian boss Domenic Primucci has been making them since he was a kid, and as his company, Pizza Nova, prepares to celebrate its 50th birthday, he thinks it's a perfect time to work undercover, in disguise, in his own stores. He is growing his chain of franchises, but is Pizza Nova's "mom and pop" feel being lost as a result of brand expansion?
30	10	"Mary Brown's"	Greg Roberts	March 21, 2013
Mary Brown's Chicken is the nation's biggest homegrown chain of quick-serve chicken restaurants. The Newfoundland-run company has embarked on aggressive expansion, to give rivals a run for their money. But can they maintain brand consistency in the process? CEO Greg Roberts turns chicken fryer for the week... And what happens when it's over results in the season's biggest employee rewards.

=== Season 4: 2013 ===
The show's fourth season, which contains 10 episodes, aired from September 19, 2013, to November 21, 2013.

No. overall	No. in season	Title	"Boss"	Original release date
31	1	"Food Banks Canada"	Katharine Schmidt	September 19, 2013
Food Banks Canada is the national organization supporting food banks across the country. Executive Director Katharine Schmidt is going to change her identity and work in disguise to visit some food banks and food programs to understand the challenges they are facing and learn how she can better support their needs.
32	2	"Northlands"	Richard Anderson	September 26, 2013
Richard Anderson, the new CEO of sports and entertainment complex Northlands, gets an ear-full from staff when he puts on a fat suit to get the skinny on his business.
33	3	"Liberty Entertainment Group"	Nadia DiDonato	October 3, 2013
Canadians spend big bucks on nights out and special events. The Creative Director of Liberty Entertainment Group, Nadia DiDonato, gives up her posh perks and poolside office to work in her own bars and banquet halls in disguise. And she discovers that workers aren't performing as well as she'd like...
34	4	"Sodexo"	Dean Johnson	October 10, 2013
Disguised Sodexo Canada boss Dean Johnson meets the Queen of Clean - and accuses her of overdoing her job and risking company profits.
35	5	"YMCA Canada"	Scott Haldane	October 17, 2013
Scott Haldane, the National CEO of YMCA Canada gets a full head of hair for the first time in 30 years, when he works in disguise in his own organization. But, as he meets his workers and gets to understand the realities of their working lives, he realizes he's also on a very personal journey of discovery.
36	6	"Mandarin Restaurants"	Tina Chiu	October 24, 2013
Competition is cutthroat in Canada's $23 billion restaurant industry. Tina Chiu, the Chief Operating Office of Mandarin Restaurants, is worried that the expansion of her giant all-you-can-eat Chinese buffet chain is at risk, and is prepared to radically change her appearance, to check out what's really happening in her restaurants.
37	7	"Calgary Transit"	Doug Morgan	October 31, 2013
Calgary Transit boss Doug Morgan struggles to cope when he joins his staff to work in disguise, cleaning vomit off buses, work in fume-filled garages, and face dangerous public confrontations. At the end of it all, he makes a surprising gesture that has one worker in tears.
38	8	"Mexx Canada"	John Gunn	November 7, 2013
The newly appointed CEO of retail giant of Mexx Canada is determined to shake-up the shop floor when he works undercover. But workers blame head office for blunders, forcing the boss to make changes from the top down.
39	9	"Sunnybrook Health Sciences Centre"	Malcolm Moffat	November 14, 2013
Working in disguise forces the Executive VP of Sunnybrook, Malcolm Moffat, to look at hospital services with new eyes when he meets Danny the over-worked painter, who struggles to keep up with never-ending fixes…
40	10	"Wok Box"	Blair Stevens	November 21, 2013
After a four-year hiatus, Blair Stevens is back at the helm of fast-food favorite Wok Box. The company has gone through a turbulent time and they've had to close some locations. But can working in disguise under an assumed identity help the Co-Founder and Director get things back on track?
