= The Fix (2008 TV series) =

- Starring: Neil Davies; Jay Purvis
- Country of origin: Canada
- Original language: English

Production
- Running time: 30 minutes

Original release
- Network: HGTV
- Release: July 3, 2008

The Fix is a Canadian reality television series that uses home renovation pranks as a primary plot device. The series premiered on July 3, 2008, on HGTV. The program is produced by General Purpose Pictures and is hosted by contractors Neil Davies and Jay Purvis. The series also airs on the Fine Living Network in the United States.

== Synopsis ==
In each episode, the homeowners are introduced to Neil and Jay who gain their trust and learn of their dreams for the ultimate home renovation. After a few days of work the homeowners are then presented with a fake space. As the homeowners are brought into the fake space Neil and Jay drag the joke out until they finally reveal that the space is a fake. The hosts, with the help of a professional design team, transform the fake into the dream space for the homeowners.
