= Anna Olson =

American-Canadian chef (born 1968)

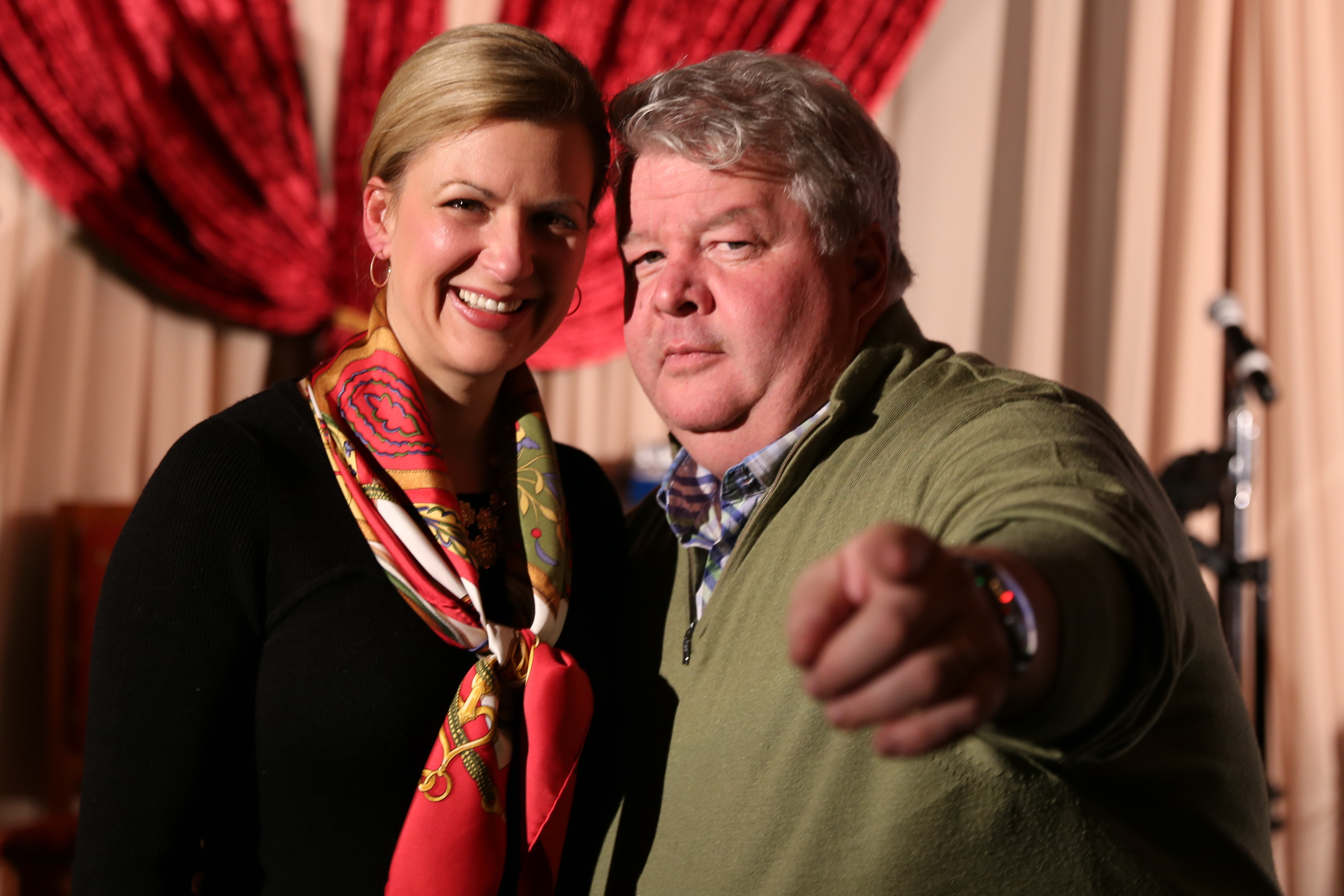
- Anna and Michael Olson
- Born: May 4, 1968 (age 58); Atlanta, Georgia, United States
- Education: Johnson & Wales University; Queen's University
- Spouse: Michael Olson
- Culinary career
- Cooking style: Bakery
- Previous restaurants
- Olson Foods at Port, St. Catharines, Ontario (2004-2009); Olson Foods at Ravine, St. Davids, Ontario (2008-2010); Inn on the Twenty, Jordan, Ontario (1995-2002)
- Television shows
- Bake with Anna Olson (2012-2015); Fresh with Anna Olson (2008-2010); Great Chocolate Showdown (2020-present); Junior Chef Showdown (2020-present); Kitchen Equipped (2005-2007); Sugar (2002-2007)
- Website: http://www.annaolson.ca/

Anna Olson (born May 4, 1968) is an American pastry chef. She was previously the host of Food Network Canada's Fresh with Anna Olson, Sugar and Kitchen Equipped and Bake with Anna Olson. She is currently a judge on both Great Chocolate Showdown and Junior Chef Showdown, both of which premiered in 2020. She hosts short videos on her YouTube channel Oh Yum with Anna Olson. She resides in Welland in the Niagara region of Ontario, Canada.

== Biography ==
Anna Tomcik Olson was born in Atlanta, Georgia. Her parents, Donna and Andy Tomcik, immigrated to Toronto where she grew up. Anna's paternal grandparents came from Slovakia. Anna earned a degree in political science and sociology from Queen's University in Kingston. She also worked for a time in a bank in downtown Toronto. During her lunch breaks, Olson wandered the St. Lawrence Market searching for different ingredients and inspiration for her next dinner party. Anna recalls that she was baking a banana muffin one night after being unable to sleep when she had a "muffin epiphany" and decided to pursue a culinary career. Anna then enrolled in the College of Culinary Arts at Johnson & Wales University in Providence, Rhode Island. Upon her graduation from the university, Olson travelled across the United States. She would eventually find her way to Niagara Falls. Olson was a pastry chef at Inn on the Twenty in Jordan, Ontario for seven years, where she met her husband, chef Michael Olson.

Olson's writings include The Inn on the Twenty Cookbook, co-authored by her husband and published in 2000. Olson also published a cookbook called Sugar in 2004. It was a companion to her TV show by the same name which aired on Food Network Canada. Olson co-authored another book with her husband which was released in October 2005. The book is called Anna & Michael Olson Cook at Home: Recipes for Everyday and Every Occasion. This is a menu-driven book which highlights how Olson and her husband cook at home. It also includes tips and tricks for entertaining and weeknight dining. In late 2006, another cookbook with recipes derived from Sugar, called Another Cup of Sugar was released. Olson also writes for publications such as Vines and LCBO Food and Drink.

Anna Olson opened Olson Food at Port in Port Dalhousie, a historic lakeside community in St. Catharines, Ontario. She sold the Port Dalhousie shop in April 2009, to their long-time friend and pastry chef Andrea Poirier and her sister Leesa Leshkewich.

In July 2008, the Olsons opened their second location, Olson Foods at Ravine, in partnership with Ravine Vineyards in St. David's, Ontario. In February 2010 it was announced that they were no longer involved with the location at The Ravine Winery and the partnership was ended.

Olson supports a local program called the Niagara Women's Enterprise Centre. The centre provides training in the hospitality sector to women who might not have that opportunity, with her end-of-the-day product given to a local YWCA women's shelter or Out of the Cold Program.

== Endorsements ==
=== Starbucks Coffee ===
Olson has been featured for the past few years in various promotions for Starbucks Coffee Canada. This started in the winter of 2004, when her Mocha Bites recipe was featured on a recipe card available in Starbucks retail stores.

In the spring of 2005, Starbucks Coffee featured Olson in television advertisements aired nationally to promote their sweepstakes that was held in-conjunction with Food Network Canada and to introduce Anna's Brown Sugar Pound Cake being sold in retail stores. This also included in-store advertising of her cake with special pastry toppers and take-home recipe cards.

In winter 2005, her Chai Decadence Chocolate Bundt Cake was one of the featured holiday pastries sold in stores (once again promoted with in-store recipe cards). Olson was also featured in the Christmas television advertisement for Starbucks Coffee Canada. In the spring of 2006, Olson appeared in television advertisements promoting Starbucks Coffee's annual Brewing Sale 2006.

=== Splenda ===
Starting in late 2005, Olson has appeared in television advertisements for Splenda and has provided recipes on their official Canadian website.

=== KitchenAid ===
Olson has appeared in television advertisements for KitchenAid appliances. Fleischmann and KitchenAid were official sponsors of Bake with Anna Olson beginning in season two.

=== Pillsbury ===
Olson did commercials for Pillsbury Christmas cookies during the 2006 Christmas season.

=== Bulk Barn ===
Olson's "Chef's Selections" appears in Bulk Barn's flyers and website.

=== Home Hardware ===
Olson has done television commercials and flyer ads for Home Hardware, advertising kitchen products and appliances. She also has a recipe section on the Home Hardware website and contributes to Home Hardware's free quarterly magazine "Home at Home".

== Filmography ==
Television
Year	Show	Role	Notes
2002-2007	Sugar	Host	
2005-2007	Kitchen Equipped	Co-host	
2008-2010	Fresh with Anna Olson	Host	
2008	Twas the Night Before Dinner Christmas Special	Herself	Christmas special with Bob Blumer, Anthony Sedlak, Laura Calder, and Ricardo Larrivée
2009-unknown	Live It Everyday	Co-host of the cooking club	
2012–2015	Bake with Anna Olson	Host	
2016	Inspired With Anna Olson	Host	
2018	Iron Chef Canada	Herself/Iron Chef	Holiday baking edition
2019	Sweet Something	Host	Short online series
2020–present	Great Chocolate Showdown	Co-Host and judge	One of the three co-hosts/judges, including Steven Hodge and Cynthia Stroud
2020–present	Junior Chef Showdown	Co-Host and judge	One of the three co-hosts/judges

== Awards and nominations ==
Anna Olson awards and nominations
Awards and nominations
Award	Wins	Nominations
Totals
Canadian Screen Awards	0	1
Grand Remi Awards - Worldfest Houston	1	1
Taste Canada Awards	2	2
Wins	3
Nominations	4

Year	Nominated work	Award	Category	Result	Ref
2009	Fresh with Anna Olson	Grand Remi Award - Worldfest Houston	Best Lifestyle Programming	Won	
2017	Bake with Anna Olson	Canadian Screen Awards	Host in a lifestyle, talk or entertainment news program or series	Nominated	
2017	Bake with Anna Olson: More than 125 Simple, Scrumptious and Sensational Recipes to Make You a Better Baker	Taste Canada Awards	Single-Subject Cookbooks - English Language - Silver	Won	
2019	Set for the Holidays with Anna Olson	Taste Canada Awards	General Cookbooks - English Language - Silver	Won	

== Bibliography ==
- Inn on the Twenty Cookbook co-written with Michael Olson (July 2003 Whitecap Publishing, ISBN 1-55285-518-X)
- Sugar - (April 2004 Whitecap Publishing, ISBN 1-55285-509-0)
- Anna & Michael Olson Cook at Home: Recipes for Everyday and Every Occasion co-wrote with Michael Olson - (October 2005 Whitecap Publishing, ISBN 1-55285-702-6)
- Another Cup of Sugar - (October 2006 Whitecap Publishing, ISBN 1-55285-809-X)
- In The Kitchen With Anna: New Ways with the Classics - (September 2008, Whitecap Publishing, ISBN 1-55285-946-0)
- Fresh with Anna Olson - (September 2009, Whitecap Publishing, ISBN 978-1-55285-995-7)
- Back to Baking: 200 Timeless Recipes to Bake, Share, Enjoy - (December 2011, Whitecap Publishing, ISBN 978-1-77050-063-1)
- Bake with Anna Olson: More than 125 Simple, Scrumptious and Sensational Recipes to Make You a Better Baker - (September 13, 2016; Appetite by Random House, ISBN 978-0-14-753021-9)
- Set for the Holidays with Anna Olson - (October 2018, Appetite by Random House, ISBN 978-0-14-753081-3)
