= H. B. Mayo =

Henry Bertram Mayo, D.Phil, FRSC, (17 June 1911—15 January 2009) was a Canadian political scientist. At the time of his death, he was Canada's oldest living Rhodes Scholar, and professor emeritus at Carleton University, Ottawa. Born in Fortune, Newfoundland, Mayo taught at a number of universities, received multiple honorary degrees and was president of the Canadian Political Science Association.

== Key ideas about democracy ==
The definition of democracy

In An Introduction to Democratic Theory (1960), Mayo argued that "a consistent and coherent theory of democracy" could be presented in terms of a few "distinguishing principles."

- (1) Popular control of policy-makers, which required "choosing the policy-makers (representatives) at elections held at more or less regular intervals."
- (2) Political equality, which is "institutionalized as the equality of all adult citizens in voting" and, more specifically, that (a) "Every adult should have the vote", (b) "One person should have one vote", (c) "Each vote should count equally", and (d) "the number of representatives elected should be directly proportional to the number of votes cast for them."
- (3) Effectiveness of the popular control, which "entails a range of political freedoms. Among them are certainly the freedoms of speech, assembly, and organization, as well as die freedom to run for office."
- (4) Majority rule, such that "policies are made by representatives, on the majority principle."
- (5) Moral standards guide policies, which suggests that it is not force and legal punishments that make a person follow the law, but rests upon "moral, customary, religious, or other obligation".

Based on these four principles, Mayo proposed the following "working definition" of democracy: "a democratic political system is one in which public policies are made, on a majority basis, by representatives subject to effective popular control at periodic elections which are conducted on the principle of political equality and under conditions of political freedom."

The value of democracy

Mayo also argued that democracy was valuable for "inherent" and "instrumental" reasons.

He listed eight "inherent" reasons:

- (1) The peaceful voluntary adjustment of disputes
- (2) Ensuring peaceful change in a changing society
- (3) The orderly succession of rulers
- (4) The minimum of coercion
- (5) Diversity
- (6) The attainment of justice
- (7) The promotion of science
- (8) The freedoms found in a democracy

He discussed two "instrumental" reasons:

- (1) The maintenance of a free economy
- (2) The preservation of individual rights

== Partial bibliography ==
"Newfoundland and Confederation in the Eighteen Sixties," Canadian Historical Review, 1948.

Democracy and Marxism, Oxford University Press, 1955.

An Introduction to Democratic Theory, Oxford University Press, 1960.

An Introduction to Marxist Theory, Oxford University Press, 1955.

== See also ==
- Robert Dahl
- Democracy
