= Fixing Dinner =

Canadian reality television series

- Created by: Sandi Richard
- Starring: Sandi Richard
- Country of origin: Canada

Production
- Running time: 30 minutes

Original release
- Network: Food Network Canada

Fixing Dinner is a Canadian food reality television series, which aired on Food Network Canada and AmericanLife in the United States. Host Sandi Richard comes "to the rescue" of a family that can't cope with making healthy, fresh dinners, and teaches how to counteract their lack of time.

The show follows a standard format - first, a 'help us' video is shown, detailing the problems the family faces. Sandi comes to their house to discuss the situation in more detail, and to inspect the kitchen. She identifies the most stressful or time crunched day of the week, labeled 'Fright Night'. She returns several days later with a menu plan of a month's worth of meals. Magnets symbolizing the various family members and the foods they will cook are placed on the fridge as she introduces this week's menu.

A shopping trip follows, with Sandi recommending various prepared or partially prepared foods as time savers (such as store-bought sauces, precut vegetables). In some episodes, a brief overview of how Sandi has reorganized the kitchen is shown.

Then Sandi proceeds to walk each family member through the meals they are preparing this week. The family is left alone to handle 'Fright Night' according to her plans.

To conclude the show, Sandi returns a month later to find out how the monthly meal plan has worked. Families always claim improvement on the problem Sandi was sent to solve. Common problems are too much fast food, lack of time to prepare dinner, one member of the family being solely responsible for meals, lack of variety, picky eaters and disparate schedules. Before the credits begin, she always ends with the phrase, "Fixing dinner isn't just about food, it's about family".
