= Kitchen Equipped =

- Starring: Stacy McLennan (Season 1); Jay Purvis; Anna Olson (Seasons 2 and 3)
- Country of origin: Canada
- Original language: English

Production
- Camera setup: Multi-camera
- Running time: 22 minutes

Original release
- Network: Food Network Canada

Kitchen Equipped is a show which aired on Food Network and HGTV.

The show, which shot three seasons was co-hosted by Canadian pastry and celeb chef Anna Olson (seasons two and three), carpenter Jay Purvis, and interior designer Stacy McLennan (season one). Both Olson and Purvis explore building and renovating a kitchen. Plus they explore gadgets, kitchen accessories, products, appliances, and a lot more. Stacey McLennan was the first winner of Designer Superstar Challenge.

Stacy McLennan was replaced after the first season with Chef Anna Olson.

Over the course of the first season, Purvis and McLennan showed the viewers how to design a kitchen. Each episode would show a little more of the kitchen being done. The second and third seasons spent less time on the process and more on the finishes of the kitchen without showing the actual construction, just the various steps.

== Current show status ==
Kitchen Equipped has aired its third season daily at 2 on HGTV. It also airs on Food Network and Fine Living.

== Kitchen styles ==
The show has many kitchen styles which are:

- Country Chic
- Electric
- Makeover Kitchen
- Modern Valcucine
- Suburban Makeover
- Urban Traditional

== Broadcasters ==
Past

- Fine Living Canada - syndicated reruns
- Food Network Canada - original broadcast
- HGTV - original broadcast
