= Superstar Chef Challenge =

- Presented by: Bob Blumer; Kevin Brauch; Christine Cushing; Rick Forde; Michael Smith
- Country of origin: Canada
- Original language: English
- No. of episodes: 2

Production
- Producer: Joseph Blasioli

Original release
- Network: Food Network Canada
- Release: June 5, 2005 – present

Related
- Handyman Superstar Challenge; Superstar Hair Challenge; Designer Superstar Challenge

The Superstar Chef Challenge is a reality/competition special produced for the Food Network Canada. Filmed at the Compass Group Canada Culinary Arts Demonstration Theatre and Kitchen Laboratory in Humber Polytechnic's North Campus, it was a pilot for a potential series.

== Description ==
Hosted by Kevin Brauch (The Thirsty Traveler), the chefs were selected from participants who sent in a five-minute tape of themselves cooking their signature dish. The winner for the first season was Dana McIntyre, and as part of the prize, she got a co-starring role in the Food Network Canada show Just One Bite. The show's supervising producer was Jenna Keane. The special was filmed during Humber Polytechnic's March 2005 Reading Week.

== See also ==
- MasterChef Canada, series of cooking elimination competition TV shows
