= Sugar (Canadian TV series) =

Canadian cooking television show

- Logo of TV Show Sugar, as seen on the book cover of the same name. (The book contains recipes from the show.)
- Genre: Cooking show
- Directed by: Michael Hooey
- Presented by: Anna Olson
- Theme music composer: Jack Lenz
- Opening theme: Sugar theme
- Country of origin: Canada
- Original language: English
- No. of seasons: 5
- No. of episodes: 151

Production
- Producer: Carol Wilkinson
- Camera setup: Multi-camera
- Running time: 24 minutes

Original release
- Network: Food Network Canada
- Release: October 1, 2002 – 2007

Related
- Fresh with Anna Olson; Bake with Anna Olson

Sugar is a TV cooking show shown on Food Network Canada hosted by Canadian pastry chef Anna Olson. The official show description reads "Anna Olson satisfies sweet cravings with great dessert recipes and guides viewers from making to plating with presentation ideas to dress up any dessert."

Premiered in October 2002, Sugar is a half-hour show which specializes in desserts. Each episode has a theme ingredient. Host Anna Olson makes one simple dessert with the theme ingredient in the first part of the show. During the second and third part, she creates a more elaborate or decadent dessert with the same ingredient. During the last few minutes of the program called the "Switch-Up", Anna re-invents the first dessert with a few tricks and turns it into something more special.

Sugar aired for five seasons on Food Network Canada and its 151 episodes has been syndicated in 40 countries.

== Episode list ==
The following is a complete list of episodes from Sugar.

=== Season 1 ===
- Almonds
- Apricots
- Bananas
- Blueberries
- Brown Sugar
- Buttermilk
- Caramel
- Cherries
- Cinnamon
- Classic Chocolate
- Coffee
- Country Apple
- Cream Cheese
- Dark Chocolate
- Dried Fruits
- Ginger
- Herbs
- Honey
- Lemon
- Lemon II
- Maple Syrup
- Mascarpone
- Milk Chocolate
- Orange
- Peaches
- Pears
- Pecans
- Pistachios
- Pumpkin
- Raspberries
- Spices
- Spirits
- Strawberries
- Tea
- Urban Apple
- Vanilla
- Walnuts
- White Chocolate
- Wine

=== Season 2 ===
- Bananas
- Blackberries
- Blood Oranges
- Brandy
- Butterscotch
- Cardamom
- Cashews
- Cheddar Cheese
- Chocolate
- Cocoa
- Coconut
- Cranberries
- Currants
- Dates
- Espresso
- Grapefruit
- Green Apples
- Green Tea
- Hazelnuts
- Lime
- Macadamia Nuts
- Mango
- Marzipan
- Mint
- Nectarines
- Nutmeg
- Oats
- Peanut Butter
- Pineapple
- Plums
- Port
- Raisins
- Rhubarb
- Ricotta
- Sesame Seeds
- Sour Cream
- Vanilla Bean
- Whipped Cream
- Yogurt

=== Season 3 ===
- Applesauce
- Bumbleberry
- Butter
- Chocolate Chips
- Citrus
- Cloves
- Coconut Milk
- Condensed Milk
- Cornmeal
- Creme Fraiche
- Extracts
- Figs
- Icing Sugar
- Irish Cream
- Jam
- Marshmallow
- Meringue
- Mocha
- Molasses
- Nut Butters
- Poppyseeds
- Praline
- Soft Cheeses
- Summer Fruits
- Toffee
- Tropical Fruit

=== Season 4 ===
- Candied Fruit
- Candy
- Cappuccino
- Caramelized Sugar
- Cereals
- Champagne
- Chocolate Mint
- Chocolate Nut
- Citrus Zest
- Classic Apple
- Cookies
- Country Spices
- Double Chocolate
- Essences
- Exotic Spices
- Fresh Berries
- Golden Raisins
- Graham
- Juices
- Liquid Sugar
- Mincemeat
- Orange Liqueur
- Pine Nuts
- Preserves
- Tangerine
- Tart Lemon

=== Season 5 ===
- Chocolate and Berries
- Classic Almonds
- Classic Cinnamon
- Classic Strawberry
- Classic Walnuts
- Clover Honey
- Cocoa Powder
- Creamy Peanut Butter
- Decadent Dark Chocolate
- Dried Berries
- Exotic Fruits
- Field Berries
- Fresh Ginger
- Fresh Peaches
- Fruit Liqueur
- Ground Nuts
- Ice Cream
- Luscious Lemon
- Mostly Maple
- Orchard Fruits
- Peppermint
- Perfect Pears
- Rich White Chocolate
- Rustic Rhubarb
- Silky Milk Chocolate
- Toasted Coconut

== Media releases ==
=== DVDs ===
Echo Bridge Entertainment, who acquired Alliance Atlantis International Distribution has started to release Sugar on DVD.

Season	Release date	Number of episodes	Number of Discs	Running time	Format	Reference
Season 1, Volume 1	September 24, 2009	20	2	460 minutes	NTSC; Region 1	

=== Books ===
Two books have been derived based on recipes from the shows, published by Whitecap Books.

- Sugar (Whitecap Books, April 2004, ISBN 1-55285-509-0)
- Another Cup of Sugar (Whitecap Books, October 2006, ISBN 1-55285-809-X)
