= Ambrose Price =

Canadian designer and television personality

- Born: Ambrose Price; February 8, 1984 (age 41); Fortune, Newfoundland, Canada
- Occupation(s): designer, TV host
- Years active: 2006-Present

Ambrose Price (born February 8, 1984) is a Canadian designer and television personality, who hosts the HGTV show The Decorating Adventures of Ambrose Price.

Price grew up in the small fishing community of Fortune on the south coast of Newfoundland. His television career began in 2006 when he applied to be a contestant on HGTV's Designer Superstar Challenge and was accepted. Although he placed fifth in the competition, he was offered his own television show, The Decorating Adventures of Ambrose Price, as the producers reportedly felt that he possessed star potential.

He currently resides in Toronto, Ontario, where he works professionally as a designer.

Price won a Gemini Award for "Best Host in a Lifestyle Program" at the 2009 Gemini Awards. It was his first nomination and win.
