= Purdys Chocolatier =

Canadian chocolate manufacturer

- Type: Private
- Industry: Chocolate and other confectionery
- Founded: 1907; 119 years ago
- Headquarters: Vancouver, British Columbia, Canada
- Key people: Richard C. Purdy, Founder; Charles Flavelle, Former Owner; Karen Flavelle, Owner; Scott McTavish, CEO
- Number of employees: 900 (2018)
- Website: purdys.com

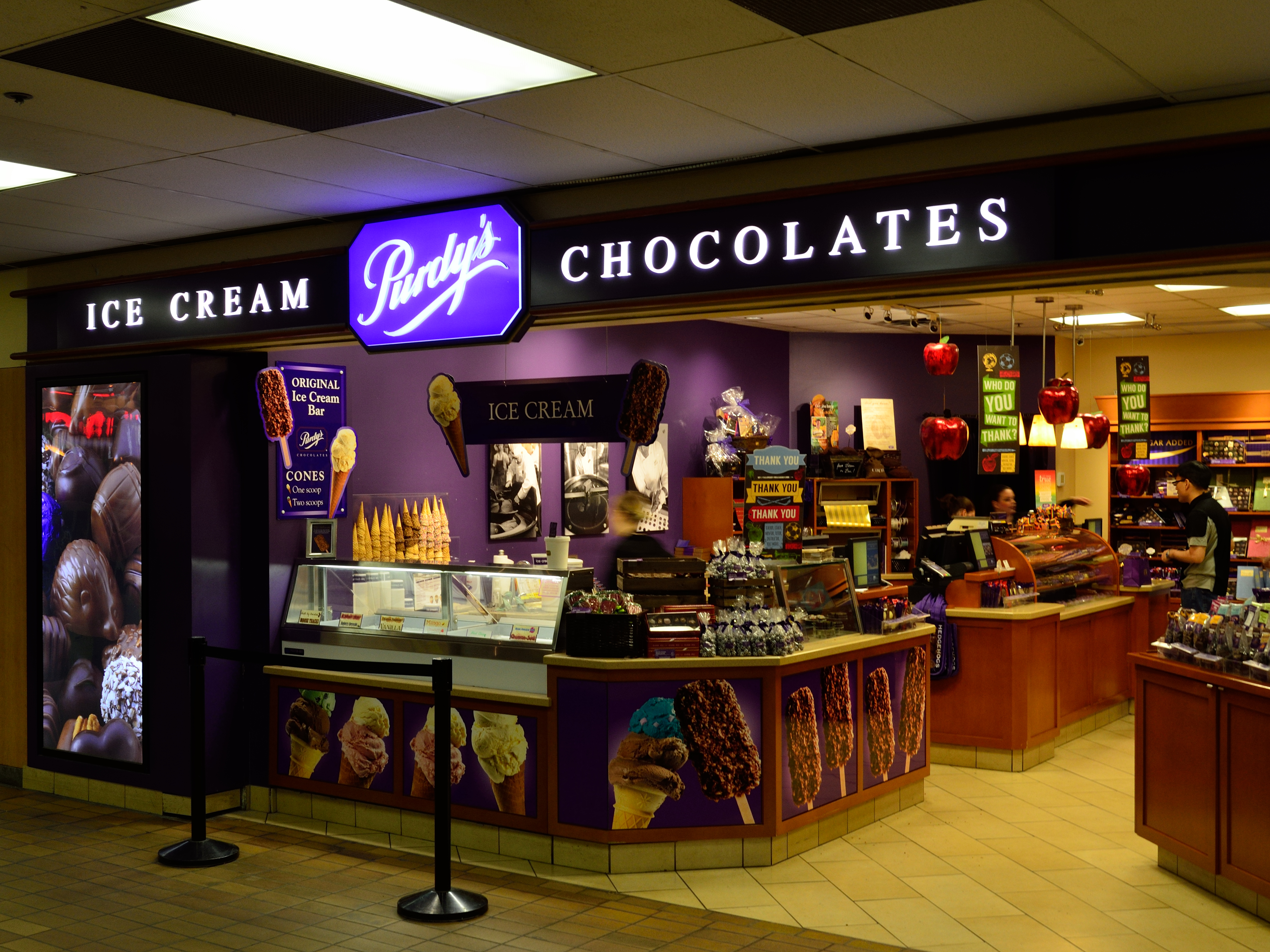
Purdys Chocolates store at Union Station (Toronto)

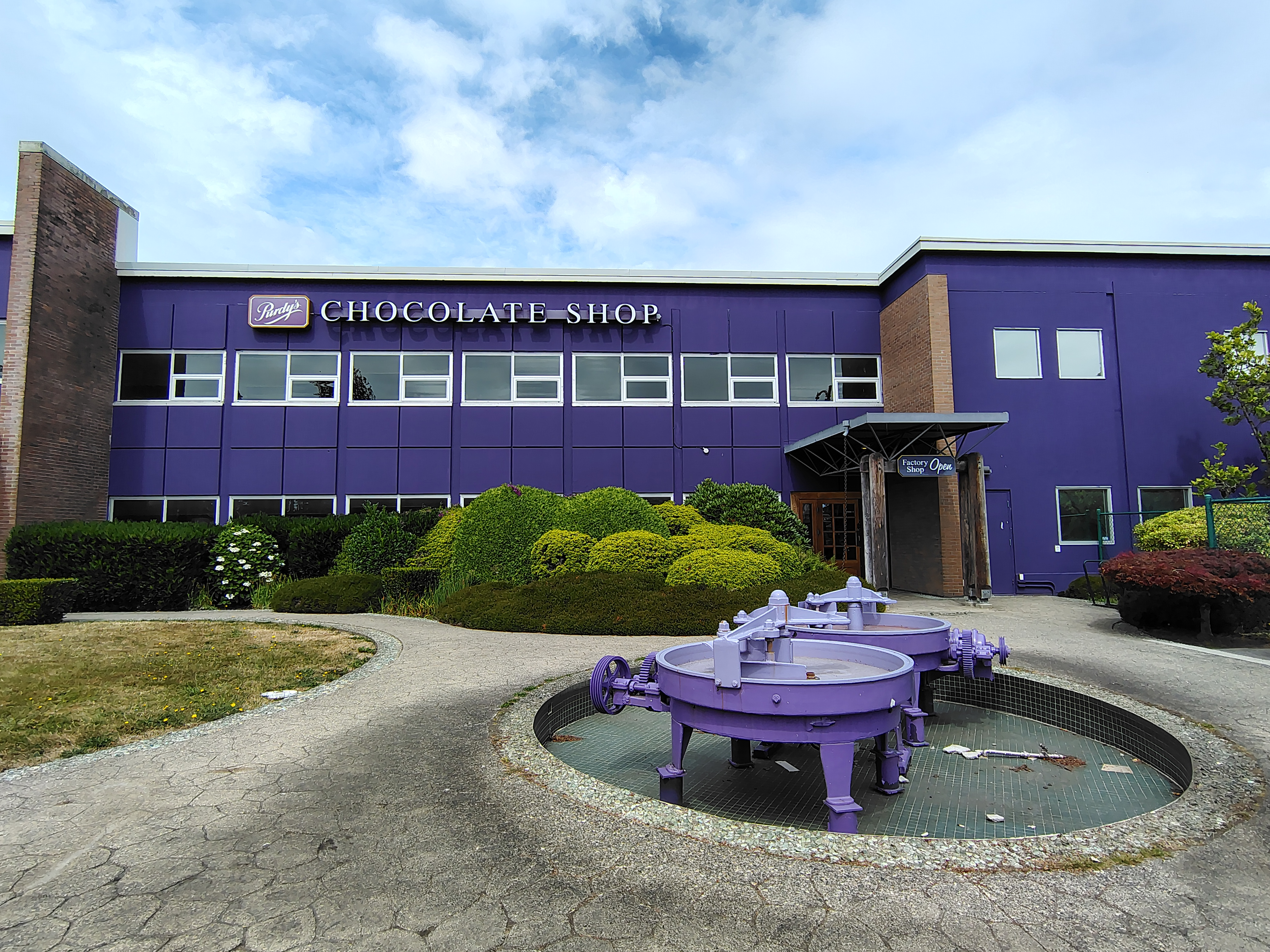
Purdys Chocolatier factory

Purdys Chocolatier is a Canadian chocolatier, confectionery manufacturer, and retail operator. The company is based in Vancouver, British Columbia, on the west coast of Canada. From its 57,000 square-foot (5,295 m^{2}) factory, Purdys produces a variety of different chocolates and confectioneries that are distributed to all of its retail locations. These products include a variety of specialty chocolates; including truffles, hazelnut Hedgehogs, caramels, creams, moulded filled chocolates, caramels and clusters. Many individual outlets also prepare ice cream bars dipped and covered in toppings of ones choice in full view of customers.

Purdys began expanding outside of British Columbia in 1970 with its first outlets opening in Alberta. Purdys then began expansion into Ontario in 2004. There are currently a total of over 70 stores in British Columbia, Alberta, Saskatchewan, Manitoba and Ontario.

== History ==
The company was founded in 1907 by Richard Carmon Purdy, who opened his first shop on Robson Street in Vancouver.

According to the 1901 census Purdy's profession was listed as a barber. After the death of his son, Purdy moved from London, Ontario to British Columbia to start a new life in Vancouver. Purdy began experimenting with creating chocolate recipes in his Vancouver home kitchen, and then selling them on the streets. In this way, he developed a "small but enthusiastic" customer base. In 1907 Purdy set up his first chocolate shop on Robson Street, which was fast becoming a bustling downtown shopping district.

In the 1920s Purdy encountered financial difficulty and was forced into receivership. Several of Purdy's major creditors, not wanting to see the company close, sent in their top bookkeeper, Hugh Forrester, to help save the company. After a few years Forrester was able to put the company back on track, and pay back all of the company's debts. Having no interest themselves in running the company, and being so impressed with his performance, the creditors decided to sell the company to Forrester for $1. Richard Purdy continued to make chocolates after his business was sold, and sold his products from a street cart in Vancouver. He then went on to open a new chocolate shop in Burnaby, British Columbia called Window Made Candy. He retired a few years later and died in February 1943.

The 1940s saw Frank Forrester join his father, Hugh, in the family business, modernised production methods, and the moving of the company's factory to a larger facility on West 7th Avenue in Vancouver. The Forresters slowly expanded the company until the early 60s, when a conflict between the visions the father and son team had for the company led them to sell Purdys in 1963 to Charles Flavelle and Eric Wilson.

Purdys expanded its presence and product lines throughout the 60s and 70s and 80s. Having originally only produced dark chocolates, they began offering milk chocolates and chocolate bars, among other products. 1971 saw Purdys open its first store outside of British Columbia in Calgary, Alberta. In 1982 Purdys moved their factory and head office to a new 57,000 square-foot factory at Kingsway and Earles Street. In the early 90s, Purdys Chocolatier introduced its Hedgehog line of chocolates.

On 12 September 2012, Purdy's was the focus of an episode of Undercover Boss.

In 2025, Purdys announced that it would begin selling its chocolates at Save-On-Foods, a Western Canadian supermarket chain, in response to high demand amid the Buy Canadian movement. It is the first time the company has sold its products at a separate retailer.
