= Superstar Hair Challenge =

- Presented by: Karen Bertelsen
- Narrated by: Karen Bertelsen
- Country of origin: Canada
- Original language: English
- No. of episodes: 7

Production
- Running time: 60 minutes

Original release
- Network: Slice Network
- Release: 2007 – present

Related
- Designer Superstar Challenge; Superstar Chef Challenge; Handyman Superstar Challenge

Superstar Hair Challenge is a reality TV show on Slice Network hosted by Karen Bertelsen. Contestants must complete hair design related challenges, and a person is executed each week.
