= Fortune, Newfoundland and Labrador =

Fortune
- Town
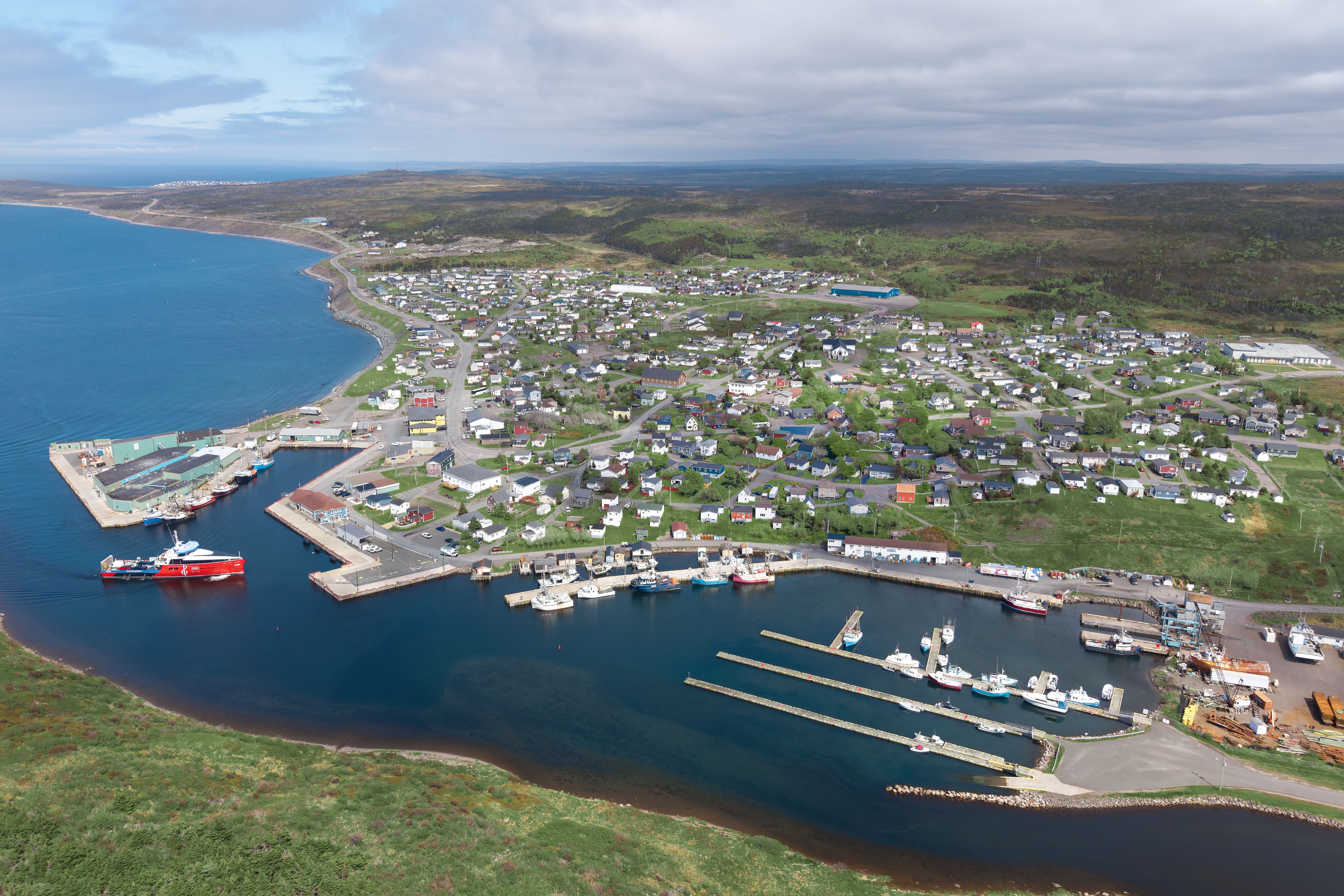
- Aerial view (2026)

- Flag Coat of arms
- Motto: Progressa Fortuna
- Location of Fortune in Newfoundland
- Coordinates: 47°04′24″N 55°49′18″W
- Country: Canada
- Province: Newfoundland and Labrador
- Incorporated: 1945

Government
  - Mayor: Deanne Hickman

Area
  - Total: 54.85 km^{2} (21.18 sq mi)

Population (2021)
  - Total: 1,285
  - Density: 25.5/km^{2} (66/sq mi)
- Time zone: UTC-3:30 (Newfoundland Time)
  - Summer (DST): UTC-2:30 (Newfoundland Daylight)
- Area code: 709
- Highways: Route 220

Fortune (2021 population: 1,285) is a Canadian town located in the province of Newfoundland and Labrador.

Fortune is situated on the western side of the Burin Peninsula on the island of Newfoundland and was incorporated as a town in 1945. The town is located near the southeastern boundary of Fortune Bay. The name of the town is believed to have originated from the Portuguese word "fortuna" meaning "harbour of good fortune."

The main industry in Fortune is the ocean fishery which employs 400 residents. The majority of species landed include cod, flounder, and haddock.

Fortune is also the nearest Canadian port for travelling to the French islands of St. Pierre and Miquelon. During the spring and summer months, a ferry connects the two islands with Fortune.

The Fortunian Stage, the earliest age of the Cambrian Period, derives its name from Fortune and Fortune Bay. The Global Boundary Stratotype Section and Point (GSSP) for this stage, which marks the base of the Cambrian System, is situated nearby at Fortune Head, approximately 2.5 kilometres northwest of the town.

== Demographics ==
In the 2021 Census of Population conducted by Statistics Canada, Fortune had a population of 1,285 living in 617 of its 767 total private dwellings, a change of −8.3% from its 2016 population of 1,401. With a land area of 54.77 km^{2} (21.15 sq mi), it had a population density of 23.5/km^{2} (60.8/sq mi) in 2021.

== Notable people ==
- H. B. Mayo, political scientist
- Ambrose Price, interior designer and television personality
