= The Thirsty Traveler =

- Created by: Susan Cardinal
- Presented by: Kevin Brauch
- Country of origin: Canada
- No. of episodes: 58

Production
- Executive producer: Bryan Smith
- Running time: 21 minutes

Original release
- Network: Food Network Canada
- Release: 2002 – 2006

The Thirsty Traveler, executive produced by Bryan Smith, is a weekly television show that explores the world's wine, beer, and spirit producing regions. Each episode explores the companies and local culture connected with the alcoholic beverage that a region is known for.

The Thirsty Traveler was created by Susan Cardinal and produced by Grasslands Entertainment.

== Episodes ==
=== Season 1 ===
No. overall	No. in season	Title	Prod. code
1	1	"Scottish Whisky"	FLTHR-101
2	2	"French Champagne"	FLTHR-102
3	3	"Irish Stout"	FLTHR-103
4	4	"Belgian Beer"	FLTHR-104
5	5	"Kentucky Bourbon"	FLTHR-105
6	6	"Ontario Icewine"	FLTHR-106
7	7	"Mexican Tequila"	FLTHR-107
8	8	"Jamaican Rum"	FLTHR-108
9	9	"Sonoma County Wines"	FLTHR-109
10	10	"Japanese Sake"	FLTHR-110
11	11	"Greek Ouzo"	FLTHR-111
12	12	"Iceberg Vodka"	FLTHR-112

=== Season 2 ===
No. overall	No. in season	Title	Prod. code
13	1	"Ports of Pleasure"	FLTHR-201
14	2	"Grabba Grappa"	FLTHR-202
15	3	"Apple Cider House Rules"	FLTHR-203
16	4	"Gin Joint Jive"	FLTHR-204
17	5	"Bitters: The World's Best Kept Secret"	FLTHR-205
18	6	"Cachaca Ole!"	FLTHR-206
19	7	"Make It Schnappy"	FLTHR-207
20	8	"Chile's Best-kept Secret"	FLTHR-208
21	9	"Maple Liqueur"	FLTHR-209
22	10	"From Russia with Vodka"	FLTHR-210
23	11	"The Birthplace of Pilsner"	FLTHR-211
24	12	"Absolutely Aquavit"	FLTHR-212
25	13	"Alaskan Beer"	FLTHR-213

=== Season 3 ===
No. overall	No. in season	Title	Prod. code
26	1	"Fruit of Africa"	FLTHR-301
27	2	"Mysteries of Mezcal"	FLTHR-302
28	3	"Secrets of Soju"	FLTHR-303
29	4	"Victorious Vermouth"	FLTHR-304
30	5	"That's Whiskey With an "E," Boyo!"	FLTHR-305
31	6	"New Zealand's Sauvignon Blancs"	FLTHR-306
32	7	"The Green Fairy"	FLTHR-307
33	8	"The Best of Bitter Beer"	FLTHR-308
34	9	"Paradise Found"	FLTHR-309
35	10	"My Dear Madeira"	FLTHR-310
36	11	"Sparkling Wines of California"	FLTHR-311
37	12	"The Heartbreak Grape"	FLTHR-312
38	13	"The Sweet Scent of Sambuca"	FLTHR-313

=== Season 4 ===
No. overall	No. in season	Title	Prod. code
39	1	"Australia: Wines Down Under"	FLTHR-401
40	2	"A River of Whiskey"	FLTHR-402
41	3	"Pisco, the Spirit of Peru"	FLTHR-403
42	4	"England: Make it Mead!"	FLTHR-404
43	5	"The Thirsty Traveler: Behind the Scenes"	FLTHR-405
44	6	"Canada: Rye Whiskey Rocks!"	FLTHR-406
45	7	"Iceland: Of Vikings And Vodka"	FLTHR-407
46	8	"Germany: Prost! To German Beer!"	FLTHR-408
47	9	"Israel: An Old Testament to Wine"	FLTHR-409
48	10	"The Best of . . ."	FLTHR-410
49	11	"Cuba: Hurrah For Havana Rum!"	FLTHR-411
50	12	"Turkey--Livin' on Lion's Milk"	FLTHR-412

=== Season 5 ===
No. overall	No. in season	Title	Prod. code
51	1	"Amazing Andalucia - Spain's Sensational Sherry"	FLTHR-501
52	2	"Caribbean Liqueurs - Aruba and Curacao"	FLTHR-502
53	3	"Ice Vodka - Sweden and Lapland"	FLTHR-503
54	4	"A Devil of a Drink - Tazmania"	FLTHR-504
55	5	"A Feast From the Far East - Taiwan"	FLTHR-505
56	6	"Wine Travels - Worldwide"	FLTHR-506
57	7	"A Wale of a Brew - Wales"	FLTHR-507
58	8	"Story of the Cocktail - Worldwide"	FLTHR-508

== Networks ==
The Thirsty Traveler was broadcast on the following networks:

- A&E Mundo
- BBC Food
- BBC Canada
- Canal Évasion
- Discovery Travel and Adventure Channel
- The Cooking Channel
- Food Network Canada
- HBO Central Europe
- Travel Channel
- Travel Channel UK
- National Geographic Channel
- Discovery Civilization

== Countries ==
The Thirsty Traveler was seen by an estimated audience in excess of 300 million viewers across six continents in over 70 countries around the world, including:

- Australia
- Canada
- Great Britain
- Japan
- Korea
- New Zealand
- Portugal
- South Africa
- United States
