= Kevin Brauch =

Canadian television presenter

Kevin Jeffery Brauch (born January 18, 1968 in Toronto, Ontario) is a Canadian television presenter.

== Early life and career ==
Born and raised in Toronto, Ontario, Brauch worked as a bartender for seven years early in his career while working his way through the Radio and Television Arts program at Ryerson Polytechnical Institute (now Toronto Metropolitan University). Brauch worked for CFNY-FM in Toronto from 1988 to 1990. He began his television career on the TVOKids programming block of Ontario provincial public broadcaster TVO in 1994 alongside Patty Sullivan.

He hosted the show The Thirsty Traveler on the Fine Living Network (originally on the Food Network), MegaWorld on Discovery Channel Canada, and Superstar Chef Challenge on Food Network Canada. He also served as the floor reporter for Iron Chef America (on both the American and Canadian Food Networks).

== Awards ==
He received the Gemini Award in 1998 for "Best Performance in a Children's or Youth Program or Series" (Stuff "Triathon"), in 1999 for "Best Host in a Lifestyle or Performing Arts Program or Series" (Canadian Gardening III) and also in 2005 for "Best Host in a Lifestyle/Practical Information or Performing Arts Program or Series" (The Thirsty Traveler).

In the Cora v. Miranda episode of Iron Chef America (2010), it was revealed that Kevin and host Alton Brown were Kentucky colonels. This appointment comes with the title of Colonel and so he could be addressed as Honorable Kevin Brauch or Colonel Kevin Brauch.
