= Designer Superstar Challenge =

- Presented by: Karen Bertelsen
- Narrated by: Karen Bertelsen
- Country of origin: Canada
- Original language: English
- No. of episodes: 14 (list of episodes)

Production
- Running time: 60 minutes

Original release
- Network: HGTV Canada
- Release: 2003 – 2006

Related
- Handyman Superstar Challenge; Superstar Chef Challenge; Superstar Hair Challenge

Designer Superstar Challenge also known simply as Superstar Challenge is a show hosted by Karen Bertelsen on HGTV Canada that has had four seasons. Similar to the American series HGTV Design Star, the show features aspiring interior designers competing in a series of challenges, following which one contestant is named the "design superstar" at the end of the competition.

It is the original "Superstar" themed show on HGTV, and went on to inspire Handyman Superstar Challenge, Superstar Chef Challenge, and Superstar Hair Challenge.

== Noted contestants ==
The winner of the challenge is supposed to get their own design TV show on HGTV, although several non-winners have also emerged as HGTV personalities.

=== Winners ===
- Stacy McLennan (2003) went on to host the HGTV show Kitchen Equipped; she now owns her own interior design firm and appears regularly as a design consultant on Citytv's daytime talk show CityLine.
- Bruno Filipe Teixeira (2006)
- Karen Sealy is the host and designer on HGTV's Summer Home, that debuted in 2011. Karen Sealy is also a guest expert on the national daytime TV show CityLine and owner of an architectural design firm Sealy Design Inc.

=== Other contestants ===
- Cheryl Torrenueva has since been a designer on other HGTV shows, including Home to Go, Rooms That Rock, Restaurant Makeover and Colin and Justin's Home Heist.
- Andrew Pike worked with Torrenueva on Rooms That Rock, and with Steven Sabados and Chris Hyndman on Design Rivals.
- Ambrose Price was given his own series, The Decorating Adventures of Ambrose Price, in 2008.
- Kimmberly Capone runs Treasures, a successful furniture and home decor business in Toronto's Yorkdale Shopping Centre, has since developed her own line of furniture and home accessories, and heads up a successful interior design business.

== See also ==
- HGTV Design Star
- Ellen's Design Challenge
