= Karen Bertelsen =

Canadian broadcaster

Karen Bertelsen is a Canadian television personality and blogger, known for hosting various programs, including HGTV Canada's Superstar-styled shows, Handyman Superstar Challenge, Designer Superstar Challenge and Slice Network's Superstar Hair Challenge.

Karen was born in Hamilton, Ontario, Canada. She attended Parkside High School and received a Bachelor's degree in Sociology from McMaster University in Canada.

Bertelsen began her career on the local community channel Cable 14 in Hamilton, and then moved to CFMT.

Bertelsen was also a personality for MuchMoreMusic, the W Expert Challenge and the lifestyle show Playing House, both for Canada's W Network. She was nominated for a Gemini Award in the hosting category for the W Network makeover show Stylin' Gypsies.

Bertelsen is the founder of the lifestyle blog "The Art of Doing Stuff".
