= Flavour Network =

Canadian specialty TV channel

- Country: Canada
- Broadcast area: Nationwide
- Headquarters: Toronto, Ontario

Programming
- Language: English
- Picture format: 1080i HDTV (downscaled to letterboxed 480i for the SDTV feed)

Ownership
- Owner: Corus Entertainment
- Parent: Flavour Network, Inc.
- Sister channels: DTour; Home Network; W Network

History
- Launched: October 9, 2000; 26 years ago
- Former names: Food Network Canada (2000–2005); Food Network (2005–2024)

Links
- Website: flavournetwork.ca

Availability

Streaming media
- StackTV: Internet Protocol television
- RiverTV: Channel 12 (HD)
- Rogers Xfinity: Channel 95 (HD)

Flavour Network (formerly known as Food Network) is a Canadian English language discretionary specialty channel owned by Flavour Network, Inc., a subsidiary of Corus Entertainment. It broadcasts programming related to food, cooking, cuisine, and the food industry, including competition, reality, and travelogue-style programs.

The channel was originally established on October 9, 2000 as a Canadian version of the U.S. cable channel Food Network, in a joint venture between Corus, Alliance Atlantis, and Food Network U.S. majority owner E. W. Scripps Company. It replaced the U.S. version of Food Network (which had been distributed in Canada since 1997) on television providers. Through various ownership changes, Corus Entertainment later became the majority owner of the channel.

In June 2024, Rogers Sports & Media announced that it had acquired Canadian rights to Warner Bros. Discovery factual and lifestyle television brands beginning in 2025, including Food Network. Rogers announced its intent to relaunch Food Network as a new discretionary specialty channel on January 1, 2025. Corus announced that it would continue to operate its existing Food Network channel under a new brand, replacing Food Network U.S. programming with other acquisitions to accompany new and existing Canadian productions. The new brand was later announced as Flavour Network, which launched on December 30, 2024.

== History ==
The U.S. Food Network was available in Canada since 1997 and became one of the more popular foreign cable channels available in Canada. This prompted the creation of a Canadian version which would then be able to access ad revenue through commercials under Canadian Radio-television and Telecommunications Commission (CRTC) regulations. Corus Entertainment and Alliance Atlantis launched the channel on October 9, 2000 at 6:00 a.m. EST.

Food Network's logo used from 2000 to 2005. After that it was changed to match the 2003 Food Network USA logo.

The licence for Food Network Canada was approved by the CRTC in early 2000. The channel was launched in October of that year; on the day of the launch, the U.S. service was removed from the list of foreign channels eligible to be broadcast in Canada.

On January 18, 2008, a joint venture between Canwest and Goldman Sachs Alternatives known as CW Media bought Alliance Atlantis and gained AAC's interest in Food Network.

Food Network logo from 2014 to 2024

On October 27, 2010, ownership changed again as Shaw Communications gained control of Food Network as a result of its acquisition of Canwest and Goldman Sachs' interest in CW Media. A high definition simulcast launched on October 5, 2011. On March 4, 2013, Corus Entertainment (also controlled by the Shaw family) announced the sale of its 22.58% ownership interest in Food Network to Shaw Media, in exchange for Shaw's 49% stake in ABC Spark. The sale closed in April 2013.

On April 1, 2016, Shaw Media was subsumed into Corus as part of a corporate reorganization, which reunited Food Network with the active Corus channels. On December 12, 2016, sister brand Cooking Channel was launched by Corus, using the W Movies license.

=== Relaunch as Flavour Network ===
On June 7, 2024, Corus announced it had been informed by Warner Bros. Discovery (WBD) that the latter would be ending its trademark licensing and program output agreements for some WBD-branded channels at the end of 2024. Three days later, Rogers Sports & Media announced it had reached an agreement with WBD for Canadian rights to lifestyle brands including Food Network beginning in January 2025. Rogers subsequently announced that it would launch its own Food Network channel on January 1, 2025.

Corus stated that it intended to continue operating most of the affected networks under new brands, maintaining their existing original programming while making new content acquisitions to supplant WBD-owned programs. In September, Corus announced that the current Food Network would rebrand as "Flavour Network" on December 30, 2024, with the channel's slate for the 2024–25 season featuring new and renewed original series (including new series featuring Andrew Phung and Pamela Anderson, and Top Chef Canada being renewed for a twelfth season), and new acquisitions (including Gordon Ramsay's Food Stars and Kitchen Nightmares among others). Some repeats of Food Network U.S. programming will continue airing into 2025, and Flavour Network also acquired programs from other WBD divisions, such as HBO Max (Chasing Flavor with Carla Hall). After the changeover, WBD divested its subsidiary stake (through Food Network's operating company, Television Food Network, G.P.) back to Corus.

== Programming ==
Original series that have been broadcast by Flavour Network include competition series such as Top Chef Canada (an adaptation of the U.S. Top Chef franchise), Halloween Bakeshop, Holiday Bakeshop, The Big Bake, Great Chocolate Showdown, and Junior Chef Showdown, as well as other series such as Carnival Eats and Project Bakeover. In the past, it also produced Canadian adaptations of Food Network's competition franchises, such as Chopped and Iron Chef.

As Flavour Network, much of the network's acquired programming comes from The Roku Channel, Studio Ramsay Global, PBS, ITV Studios, and other foreign broadcasters.

== See also ==
- Canadian cuisine
