= Canada's Worst Driver 8 =

- Season 8
- No. of episodes: 8

Release
- Original network: Discovery Channel
- Original release: October 29 – December 17, 2012

Season chronology
- ← Previous; Canada's Worst Driver 7 Next → Canada's Worst Driver Ever

Canada's Worst Driver 8 is the eighth season of the Canadian reality TV show Canada's Worst Driver, which aired on the Discovery Channel. As with previous years, eight people, nominated by their family or friends, enter the Driver Rehabilitation Centre to improve their driving skills. The focus of this season was on Big City Driving. This year, the Driver Rehabilitation Centre is located at the Dunnville Airport in Dunnville, Ontario for the third straight season. The initial drive started in Niagara Falls, Ontario and the final road test occurred in Hamilton, Ontario.

== Experts ==
Three experts return from the seventh season, though Peter Mellor, head instructor for the past three seasons, is not among them.

- Cam Woolley is the show's longest-serving expert, having been present in every season except the first and has seen the habits of Canadian drivers change drastically since 2000, with the most common offense having changed from DUI to distracted driving. He is the traffic expert on CP24 in Toronto and had a 25-year career as a traffic sergeant with the Ontario Provincial Police.
- Philippe Létourneau is a veteran high-speed driving instructor who counts BMW and Ferrari among his clients. Since joining the show in the third season, the average car has gained considerably in speed and acceleration, with the high-speed emphasis of this season making his job a particularly important one.
- Shyamala Kiru returns for her second season as the resident psychotherapist and relationship expert.
- Tim Danter is the new head driving instructor this season who is with DriveWise. He is from Oakville, Ontario.

== Contestants ==
- Robert Cárdenas, 26, from Toronto, Ontario (originally from Cuba), is a college student who owns a car but has no real desire to drive it; he prefers public transit because he is an overly cautious and slow driver who cannot handle highway speeds or large numbers of other vehicles and pedestrians. He is considering selling his car if he cannot improve his driving skills. He was nominated by his friend, Socrates. He drives a gray Hyundai Sonata and drove a blue Nissan Altima to the rehab centre.
- Margherita Donato, 31, from Edmonton, Alberta, is a bar owner focused on her appearance than her driving, which resulted in $250,000 in damage by running into an RV. Margherita is just one ticket away from having her license suspended. Margherita has also admitted to bribing her driving examiner $80 to pass her test. She was nominated by her best friend and business partner, Cheryl Schultz, who now does all the driving for their business, Sneaky Pete's Bar and Grill. She drives a green Suzuki Aerio and drove a green Ford Focus to the rehab centre.
- Azim Kanji, 28, from Edmonton, Alberta, failed his learners' test six times before finally getting his license, but is unable to reverse or park his car and had a $2,300 speeding ticket, which led to him closing his hair caused by the stress. He was nominated by his buddy, Ray. He drives a red Volkswagen Corrado and drove a red Pontiac G5 to the rehab centre.
- Klyne Postnikoff, 18 and licensed for two years, from Kelowna, British Columbia, is a short order cook who has written off two cars, including his mother's, within two weeks of having his license, had his license suspended, and caused ten accidents; he continues to text while driving, continues to speed and believes he is invincible. Klyne was nominated by his mother, Maureen, who laughs at his crashes on the show and continues to pick up the tab for his accidents and insurance. He drives a red Dodge Durango 4x4 and drove a blue GMC Sierra to the rehab centre.
- Dallas Sam, 26, from Vancouver, British Columbia, is a university student with a tough-girl appearance, but is really a nervous wreck behind the wheel of a car. Her sister, Gene, thinks she may have gotten her license based on looks rather than driving skills. She drives a tan GMC Jimmy and drove an orange Chevrolet Cobalt to the rehab centre.
- Kevin Simmons, 25, from McBride, British Columbia (now lives in Burnaby, British Columbia), is a grocery store worker born with no vision in his right eye and needs a new corrective lens for his left eye annually. Kevin has had five accidents so far (two of them serious). He was nominated by his boyfriend, Lenny Stone, who really wants Kevin to stop driving altogether. He drives a white Ford LTD Crown Victoria and drove a gray Dodge Grand Caravan to the rehab centre.
- Flora Wang, 39, from Edmonton, Alberta (originally from China), is a home care worker who immigrated to Canada in 2006 and only had ten hours of training before getting her license and has anxiety behind the wheel, often freezing in the middle of traffic when she becomes worried, as English is not her first language. She relies on her husband, Frank, for driving advice, although Frank is frequently wrong. (Flora almost rolled the show's 2012 Mustang GT at 140 km/h during the Eye of the Needle because she didn't understand the need to take her foot off the accelerator.) She drives a red Dodge Grand Caravan and drove a silver Dodge Grand Caravan to the rehab centre.
- Diane Zbierski, 38 and licensed for four years, from Saint-Jean-sur-Richelieu, Quebec (near Montreal), is so hesitant to drive, she cannot take her son to school 0.5 km (0.31 mi) away. She got her license after persistent nagging from her family and, once she got it, told her husband of ten years, Stephane, not to talk to her about driving again. She drives a white Nissan Pathfinder and drove a silver Chevrolet Equinox to the rehab centre.

== Synopsis ==
Contestant	1	2	3	4	5	6	7	8
Kevin Simmons	IN	IN	IN	IN	IN	IN	IN	CWD
Flora Wang	IN	IN	IN	IN	IN	IN	IN	CWD
Diane Zbierski	IN	IN	IN	IN	IN	IN	IN	OUT
Margherita Donato	IN	IN	IN	IN	IN	IN	OUT	
Azim Kanji	IN	IN	IN	IN	IN	OUT		
Klyne Postnikoff	IN	IN	IN	OUT				
Dallas Sam	IN	IN	OUT					
Robert Cardenas	IN	OUT						

(CWD) The contestants became Canada's Worst Driver.
(OUT) The contestant graduated.
(IN) The contestant was shortlisted for graduation.

== Episodes ==
No.	Title	Original release date
0: Canada's Worst Driver	"U Asked!"	October 28, 2012
Host Andrew Younghusband answers the most frequently asked questions from fans about the show. Those questions are in regard to him and his role, the experts, the nominees, the nominators, the vehicles used and the collective interactions with each other and with the crew (most specifically with what are assumed the several damaged cameras). Andrew also passes along a message from several fans to perhaps the most beloved of the 56 nominees to date-- Aaron Cheshire, whose reasons for being at the Drivers' Rehabilitation Centre in the previous season outlined what all the other 55 nominees should have taken to heart—and answers the most frequently asked question of all: in his opinion, who indeed is Canada's Worst Driver?
1	"Here They Come..."	October 29, 2012
The Drive to Rehab: This season, the journey to the Driver Rehabilitation Centre begins from the parking lot of the old Niagara Falls Memorial Arena in Niagara Falls. The contestants depart in the following order: Flora, Robert, Dallas, Kevin, Diane, Azim, Margherita and Klyne. For once, none of the drivers are stopped by the police or the show's crew, though most do make a large number of moving violations on the way to rehab and the contestants arrive in the following order: Robert (who never signaled once and ran a red light, as well as going 81 km/h); Diane (despite her stress); Azim (who missed an early turn and went completely off-course for a while; Klyne (who drove while texting and sped up to 135 km/h in an 80 km/h zone); Dallas (who cried); Margherita (who finished with 17 moving violations); Kevin (who drove like a rookie), and; Flora (despite being the first to leave for rehab).; Results: First to Arrive: Robert was the second to leave, but the first to arrive.; Last to Arrive: Flora was the last.; Fastest to Arrive: Klyne was the fastest to arrive, going 135 km/h in an 80 km/h zone.; Slowest to Arrive: Kevin was the slowest to arrive. (During his drive, he nearly collided with another car while merging onto a highway.) He arrived at 2:50.; Mustang Challenge - Basic Assessment: For their first challenge, drivers are put through a short evaluation test to determine their levels of driving skill—U-turning a Ford Mustang GT in an enclosed space made of concrete blocks, followed by a short reverse course made up of wheel rims and then a slalom between foam people at 50 km/h.; Margherita is first-up; before she starts, Andrew expresses concern about her wearing high-heeled shoes while driving. She scratches the Mustang's paint job in the initial section. Later, she goes too slow on the slalom and neglects to check the speedometer, striking two of the five foam figures.; Azim scratches the car in the initial section, with his stress resulting in a poor performance in the reverse section and ultimately resulting in him driving with just one hand on the wheel and speeding in the slalom, resulting in a spin-out.; Kevin becomes the first driver to cause a severe dent in the Mustang's body during the opening U-turn and knocks over several rims; he then ends up driving slowly in the slalom, yet still hits four of the five foam people.; Dallas relies on Gene's advice during initial U-turn, but ultimately completes the section without any damage to the car. She copes a little better in the reversing section than any of the previous drivers, though she still knocks down several wheel rims; it's a similar story in the slalom, where she has the best run yet, but still knocks down a foam person. Andrew identifies her problem as being a lack of confidence in her own abilities, something Dallas and Gene both agree with.; Frank's constant interference and poor advice causes Flora to repeatedly strike the concrete blocks during her run; Andrew briefly removes him to let Flora complete the opening section cleanly. Upon returning, however, Frank grabs the steering wheel, leading to a poor performance in the reversing section and a failed slalom where Flora strikes the foam figures despite driving far too slowly.; Klyne intentionally scrapes the Mustang in the opening section, resulting in the challenge being halted after the initial U-turn.; Diane fares better than most of the previous drivers and gets through the opening section, but she strikes several wheel rims and foam figures in the remaining two sections.; Finally, Robert has the best run of the day, getting through the U-turn perfectly and then not knocking over a single wheel rim in the reverse section. However, during the slalom, he only drives at 35 km/h and still strikes a majority of the foam figures.; Results: Best Performer: Robert managed to pass two out of the three challenges.; Worst Performer: Klyne didn't take the challenge seriously and his run was halted after intentionally scrapping the Mustang at the U-turn portion. Of the nominees who did complete the challenge, Kevin did the worst due to causing a dent in the Mustang and hitting four foam figures despite going slow.; After the challenge, the drivers have their initial meeting with the experts. Robert is reminded that driving too slowly is an offense (he admits actually being fined for doing so at least once), and the experts identify the need to address his high-speed nervousness. Stress is also felt to be the biggest issue for Margherita, Dallas, Diane and Azim. Flora admits that Frank isn't her only problem and that she still needs to drastically improve her skills. The experts all reprimand Klyne for his reckless attitude, both in the episode and toward the ten accidents he caused prior to the show. Kevin admits from the very start that he may be Canada's Worst Driver. No one graduates this episode, as it serves merely as a skills evaluation.
2	"Look Out!"	November 5, 2012
Head-to-Head Reversing: In a new challenge for this show, pairs of drivers are required to reverse down a short course, turn around in reverse and then reverse back to the start. As an added difficulty, this challenge is performed in right-hand drive Toyota Celsiors.; Kevin and Margherita are the first pair to take the challenge; both drivers cross into each other's lanes and demolish large sections of the course. Margherita manages to finish the course, but not without failing. Kevin quits after getting his car wedged on a piece of styrofoam.; Klyne and Robert are the second pair; Klyne completes the course with no major issues, but Robert only uses his wing mirrors to guide him and gets stuck on a set of rims.; Flora and Azim are the third pair; Flora gets her car wedged on a rim at the halfway point and becomes stuck. Azim also does well for the first portion of the course, but quits after being unable to effectively make a reverse turn at the end of the track.; Diane and Dallas are the final pair; Diane speeds near the end and wrecks a significant number of styrofoam obstacles. Dallas only uses her wing mirrors, and she demolishes a significant portion of it despite completing the course.; The Trough: In one of the show's classic challenges, the drivers are asked to drive a Suzuki Sidekick through a concrete trough, in a test of their ability to tell where their wheels are. If the drivers fall off the trough at any point, they are required to start over. In a new addition to the challenge, a "wooden bridge" was incorporated into the course (technically a section of corduroy road made with railway ties), giving drivers a chance to realign their wheels between sections.; Azim is the first to attempt the challenge; he nearly passes on his first attempt, but falls off on the final turn. His subsequent stress results in him failing.; Diane, despite difficulties on the final turn, completes the course on one go.; Robert shows signs of improvement after poor initial runs, but runs out of time before he can finish the challenge.; Flora's initial run is deemed invalid when Frank is revealed to be micromanaging her steering. She fares well on her subsequent runs, but not without running out of time.; Klyne keeps falling off due to tight turns; he eventually completes the section, but is deemed to have failed due to Maureen's decisions.; Margherita fails to get past the first turn.; Dallas, much like Azim, becomes overwhelmed after falling off halfway through her initial rum.; Kevin is the last to take the challenge and fails to get past the first turn.; Mustang Challenge - Shoulder Check Challenge: This challenge, in which drivers must accelerate to 70 km/h and then correctly perform a shoulder check to determine on which side of an obstacle it is safe to turn in order to avoid it, has a new twist in that the drivers have two runs and will always be told to stop before the obstacle on the first run, thus also making this a test of their braking and speed control.; Dallas drives too fast in her first run, resulting in her taking the right turn rather than stopping. After resetting (and putting in a hair clip) for her second run, she passes without difficulty.; Diane has a similarly poor initial run, speeding and turning the wheel as she turns her head; on her second run, she correctly identifies the lane she needs to go into, albeit too early and resulting in several land markers being destroyed.; Klyne correctly identifies to stop on the first run, but he strikes the central obstacle due to excessive speed. (He passes on the second run.); Azim drives with excessive speed and with one hand on the wheel in his first run; on his second run, he repeats the same mistake and turns into the wrong lane.; Due to a misunderstanding of the rules, Flora takes the right-hand exit on her first run instead of stopping, then passes the challenge on the second run.; Margherita drives at over 90 km/h in her initial run and strikes the lane markers. On her second run, she speeds again, turns into the wrong lane, and wrecks the passenger side wing mirror when she clips the central obstacle.; Because Kevin has vision in only one eye, he is mandated to stop on his first attempt; however, Kevin's delayed braking results in him striking the obstacle. On his second attempt, Kevin tries to oversee the challenge's requirements by checking only over his left shoulder and reasoning that a red signal on that side required him to turn right.; Robert is the last to take the challenge; he drives at an excessive speed and wrecks the central obstacle on his first run. (His second run goes more successfully and he completes the challenge.); Results; Best performer: Although no one passes on the first attempt, Dallas, Flora, Kylne, and Robert all managed to pass on their second tries.; Worst performer: Kevin did the worst due to trying to cheat on his second attempt.; While there are three obvious candidates to be the season's first graduate (Klyne, Flora, and Robert), Robert is the only driver who actually wants to graduate. Cam and Shyamala both vote that Robert should graduate, as they feel that his major issue of being too slow and lacking in confidence has been addressed; they are unconvinced that Klyne's attitude has sufficiently improved. Andrew and Philippe want Klyne to graduate for doing better in the challenges, leaving Tim with the deciding vote (his first as an expert), which he casts in favour of Robert, who becomes the season's first graduate.
3	"Look Where You Want To Go"	November 12, 2012
Distracted Driving: This year's take on the annual challenge has two parts. In the first, Kim Lee, an employee of show sponsor Kal Tire, is brought in to test the drivers' knowledge of road signs. In the second, each of the drivers is given a task to do (such as putting on make-up, drinking a soda or speaking into a phone) while driving a Ford Crown Victoria (modified to look like a taxi) around a figure-eight course. There are no passes or fails in this challenge, as its sole purpose is to demonstrate that a driver should avoid doing anything that distracts them at the wheel.; Mustang Challenge - Eye of the Needle: Another returning challenge, in which drivers must thread their vehicle through five archways at 70 km/h.; Klyne is warned by both Andrew and Maureen not to speed, but he quickly accelerates to 100 km/h, strikes the first arch, and goes off-course.; Azim strikes the first three arches on the passenger side, though manages to drive through the final two arches safely.; Margherita takes the first two arches safely, but she accelerates at 100 km/h and goes off the course before the third arch.; After a brief stress counseling session from Shyamala, Dallas performs perfectly, going slightly slower than requested at 65 km/h. (She is still given a pass.); Due to her anxiety over driving at high speeds (like Dallas), Diane is allowed to take the course at 50 km/h. (She still strikes the first two arches on the passenger side.); Flora accelerates to 140 km/h and spins off the course, destroying the car's rear bumper in the process.; Kevin is the final driver to take this challenge; he clips four of the five arches and destroys the fifth.; Results: Best Performer: Dallas, who drove at 65 km/h instead of 70, but was the only driver to pass.; Worst Performer: Of the drivers who did manage to stay on the road, Kevin sturck four out of the five arches. (However, Flora accelerated to 140 km/h, spun off the course, and ripped off the rear bumper.); The Figure-Eight Challenge: For the final challenge of this episode, drivers must reverse a school bus (technically a "skoolie") through a figure-eight course without hitting anything, with usage of the side mirrors being paramount.; Klyne, who is first, proceeds recklessly through the challenge, causing substantial damage to the course. (Andrew subsequently criticizes Maureen, who continued to cheer Klyne on despite the damage that he caused.); Prior to attempting the challenge, Kevin reveals to Andrew that he usually doesn't check his wing mirrors; he causes subsequent damage to the course.; Margherita, Dallas, and Azim have the most improved performance than previous runs.; Diane is coached by Andrew due to anxiety issues, but eventually completes the course with minimal damage.; Flora fails at comprehending how to use her mirrors, thus failing the challenge.; Results: Best Performer: Dallas, Azim, and Diane, who did the challenge perfectly.; Worst Performer: Kevin caused severe damage to the course, whereas Klyne was reckless throughout the challenge. (Flora failed the challenge, too, albeit with less damage and recklessness than Kevin and Klyne, respectively.); Dallas is the only driver who shows desire to graduate. Despite this, the experts unanimously decide that Diane should be the person who graduates, feeling that she has a better overall attitude than Dallas and would be safer to send back out onto the road. Andrew disagrees, pointing out that Dallas had been the best performing driver until this point. Andrew then argues that the panel should not overlook Diane's failure in the Eye of the Needle challenge at reduced speed. Ultimately, Andrew convinces the experts that Dallas should become the second graduate.
4	"Making a Splash"	November 19, 2012
Trailer Driving: In this year's take on the challenge, the candidates reverse a Dodge Ram Campervan with an attached hot dog cart through a short course.; Klyne takes the challenge first, completing it just as quickly as Andrew did in his demonstration.; Azim's stress problems prompt him to quit after repeatedly jackknifing at the halfway point.; Margherita eventually succeeds in completing the course, though she takes 37 minutes.; Flora initially does well on the challenge, but Frank begins micromanaging her, resulting in her quitting.; Stephane insists that Diane do the course herself, which leads to her walking the course to understand. (She succeeds, but takes the longest time yet at 55 minutes.); Kevin's time on the challenge takes him until sunset, forcing the crew to use the headlights of other vehicles to mark out the course; he eventually quits after dark.; Results: Best Performer: Kylne, Margharita and Diane are the only ones that pass this challenge, but Klyne did the fastest of the three.; Worst Performer: Azim, Flora, and Kevin all fail due to quitting the challenge.; The Water Tank Challenge: The candidates must drive a modified PT Cruiser with a roof-mounted water tank smoothly through a course to avoid getting wet.; Despite resolving to not get wet at all, Andrew is splashed for the fifth straight season after taking a slalom turn too wide.; Margherita is the first candidate to take the challenge; she ends up spilling her water on at the end of the initial straight due to delayed braking. Cheryl gets splashed the most during their run, causing her to criticize Margherita of doing it on purpose (Margherita loses 80 litres (21 US gal) during the challenge).; Diane also brakes too late and loses a significant amount of water; she ends up losing a total of 70 litres (18 US gal).; Kevin is the third driver in a row to brake too late at the start. Though the exact amount of water that he lost was not disclosed, Andrew specified that his run saw him lose more water than the other drivers.; Klyne lapses into his speeding habits again, leading to Maureen becoming soaked; however, he only loses just 40 litres (11 US gal).; Azim brakes too sharply at the beginning and repeatedly goes off-course in the reversing section, resulting in him losing 70 litres (18 US gal).; Flora's erratic acceleration results in her losing a lot of water on the opening straight; in addition, she didn't drive at the required 50 km/h, meaning she is mandated to redo the course. (She ultimately lost 80 litres (21 US gal).); Results: Best Performer: Klyne struck some obstacles but did the best with losing 40 litres (11 US gal).; Worst Performer: Kevin carelessly struck the most objects out of the whole group and lost the most water, according to Andrew. (Flora did lose the most water in the entire group, but with a smoother performance than Kevin.); Mustang Challenge - Swerve and Avoid: For this year's take on a challenge that has previously been credited with saving viewers' lives, the drivers must drive toward a cityscape at 70 km/h and avoid a styrofoam dog walker by swerving promptly and not hitting the brakes. Each driver has two runs to complete the challenge.; Klyne is told to take a practice run at 90 km/h, which proves to be too fast to complete the course. Despite this, he goes at 90 km/h in his first run and strikes the cityscape. On his second run, Klyne goes at the required speed and passes.; Margherita clips the cityscape on the passenger side despite Cheryl's coaching. Her second run is more successful, and she passes not only the challenge but her first challenge.; Before her run, Flora reminds Frank to be silent; she ends up passing on her first attempt.; Diane brakes on her first run and strikes the cityscape; her second run results in her driving at an excessive speed, crashing into the cityscape head-on.; Azim succeeds on his first attempt.; Kevin demonstrates a case of target fixation on his first run, steering directly at the obstacle he was supposed to avoid. He then strikes the cityscape on his passenger side on his second run.; Results; Best Performer: Although everyone but Diane and Kevin pass this challenge, Flora and Azim did the best for passing on their first attempts; Worst Performer: Diane and Kevin are the only two nominees to fail this challenge.; Prior to the judges' deliberations, Maureen joins Klyne; the two reflect on their respective attitudes and the role they played in Klyne's destructive habits. To the judges, Klyne is the only possible graduate; while Shyamala argues that no one should graduate this episode, the others conclude that there is nothing more they can teach him; Klyne becomes the third graduate.
5	"Ice Cream"	November 26, 2012
The episode begins with Andrew receiving a letter from Halifax speech coach Robert Spears criticizing Andrew over his pronunciation of "kilometre.": Ice Cream Truck Parallel Park: After receiving a lesson from Tim on how to parallel park (as none of the remaining five can do so based on their audition footage), the nominees' next challenge is to parallel park an ice cream truck. An ambulance will also blare at them on their on coming through a narrow straight course.; Azim immediately gets stressed upon seeing the ambulance; however, he remembers the therapy session with Shyamala and passes after three attempts.; Diane manages to parallel park on her first attempt thanks to remembering the steps out loud.; Kevin focuses on his passenger side mirror rather than his driver side mirror. Even with Andrew reminding Kevin the steps, Kevin fails.; Frank's ordering of Flora results in failures. Even after she ignores him, Flora ends up with significant distance from the curb and the car in front of her.; Although Margherita remembers the lessons, she struggles to get herself positioned properly and strikes the car behind her.; Results; Best performer: Both Azim and Diane pass this challenge, but Diane did the best of the two due to successfully parallel parking on her first try.; Worst performer: While no one else passes, Kevin did the worst due to failing to apply the lessons even after Andrew reminded him what the steps were.; Canada's Worst Gas Station: In a semi-recurring challenge that has occurred since Season 2, the nominees are tasked to park in a gas station simulation. Of the six available pumps, one of them only gives out diesel fuel. There are also blocker cars in the gas station; any collisions or lawbreaking will result in the nominee having to do a loop.; Diane is forced to do a loop after hitting a car in front of her; however, she manages to be the first person to park and receive gas.; Flora's poor positioning when trying to parallel park and pumping gas in a running vehicle forces her to do a loop as well.; Kevin is forced to loop after hitting a yellow post.; Margherita and Azim become the second and third person to park, respectively.; This leaves Kevin and Flora left to park. Although Kevin's pump reaches his car, he fails due to acting selfishly. (As a result, Flora is the only person who does not get a pump.); Mustang Challenge - Reverse Flick: Following a lesson from Philippe on doing the reverse flick, the nominees are tasked to do the maneuver in an open-boxed course. All the nominees get five attempts to do this challenge.; Azim goes too slow trying to do the maneuver on his first four attempts and fails his final attempt by oversteering and going off-course.; Margherita fails her first three attempts from oversteering and drifting, For her final run, Margherita passes.; Diane's drifts to the right and does the maneuver too late, resulting in the front bumper detaching. The rest of Diane's runs end in failure due to her poor reversing skills and not looking at where she wants to go.; Flora believes that she doesn't need to steer while going in a straight line and fails the challenge, but Andrew expresses concern about Frank's behavior towards Flora as a factor.; Kevin fails to look back in the way Phillipe taught him and strikes the entrance barrier on his first four attempts. (Kevin passes on his final attempt after help from Andrew.); When meeting the experts, the five nominees are reluctant to graduate, with Azim going as far as to refuse getting his licence back, even if they think he's ready to graduate. Still, the experts debate on who to graduate, coming between Diane and Margherita, but even they are hesitant about sending either one of them home. Consequently, no one graduates this episode.
6	"Hole in One"	December 3, 2012
Changing a Tire: The rehab centre invited local mechanic Kim Lee of Kal Tire back to show the drivers how to change a tire. They were asked to change a tire while it was "raining" with a sprinkler.; Azim and Diane replace the spare tires respectively between 15 - 20 minutes.; Margherita fails to get spare tire on and quits.; Kevin completes the change in 16 minutes, the fastest of the group.; Flora prefers instead to call CAA if she had a flat tire.; The Teeter-Totter: In this returning challenge (which Andrew notes is being run later in the season than previously due to the drivers' habit of destroying the clutches on the test cars), the drivers are put at the wheel of a manual transmission car, which they are asked to balance on a teeter-totter.; Flora takes the challenge first and fails due to Frank's orders and criticism; in addition, she punctures a tire during the challenge.; Prior to Margherita's run, Andrew presents her with a new pair of flat-soled sports shoes. However, Margherita accelerates excessively, and she struggles to balance teeter-totter; Margherita eventually ends up destroying the car's clutch.; Diane balances the teeter-totter faster than Andrew did in his demonstration; Azim also passes the challenge, albeit with more time.; Kevin has the final run, but he accelerates excessively and switches gears rapidly, causing the car to stall.; Results: Best Performer: Diane, who was able to do it with the fastest amount of time on her first try.; Worst Performer: Margherita, who burnt out the clutch. (Kevin also did poorly, stalling the car almost 40 times.); Mustang Challenge: Mini Golf: This new challenge gives the drivers nine runs at driving an oversized golf ball through a similarly oversized windmill tunnel.; Diane criticizes Stephane for her underwhelming performance after his advice caused her to miss her seven shots.; Azim takes a scientific approach by balancing the ball on the left-hand side of the front bumper in order to compensate for the strong wind; he scores four times.; Like Azim's approach, Kevin tries to use short bursts of acceleration and strong hits to guide the ball to its target, but his strategy fails when he scores only one goal.; Margherita fails her first five attempts by not understanding where the bumper is, but she scores on her final four attempts.; Finally, Flora's attempt is invalidated and abandoned due to her significantly slow pace, in addition to failing to score at all.; Forward Handbrake J-Turn: In another of the show's traditional challenges, the drivers are each required to make a handbrake turn in a Mini Cooper and swerve around a foam person featuring the driver's own face inside a confined space; each driver has five attempts.; Kevin fails his first attempt by taking the run at 70 km/h instead of the requested 40 km/h; he reduces his speed for his second run for a pass.; Flora goes too slow in her first run, clips the entry obstacles in the second, drives directly into the foam figure of herself on the third, uses the footbrake instead of the handbrake on the fourth, and plows through the foam figure of herself again, ending up in the adjoining field in her final run.; Azim, who is now finally showing confidence and self-belief, passes on his first attempt.; Before Margherita's run, Andrew presents her with articles detailing accidents caused by driving in high heels and wedges (though Cheryl dismisses his concerns). Margherita subsequently fails the challenge by repeatedly using the footbrake instead of the handbrake, attributing her failure to a lack of focus.; Diane attempts the manoeuvre too late on her first run, goes too slowly on her next three runs, and then hitting the foam figure of herself on her final run.; Results: Best Performer: Azim passed passed on his first attempt with no issue.; Worst Performer: Flora, as she plowed through the foam figure of herself and through the side wall, which Andrew deemed as the worst run that he ever seen on the challenge.; Prior to the experts' deliberations, Cam warns Margherita that wearing wedge heels (or any other form of difficult footwear) is considered a criminal offense if it is judged to have been responsible for an automotive accident. While Andrew encourages Diane to put herself forward for graduation, she admits that she does not deserve to graduate based on her performance in this episode and Flora also does not want to graduate. Azim, on the other hand, feels that he finally has the confidence and skills to graduate. Kevin, meanwhile, is informed that certain drivers (referring to Canada's Worst Driver 3 "winner" Jason Zhang and Canada's Worst Driver 5 "runner-up" Mike Butt) have given up driving in the wake of their respective appearances on the show. Kevin's response is to call the drivers in question "stupid" and vow never to give up driving even if he's named Canada's Worst Driver. With Azim the best performer in the episode and the only driver showing any desire to leave, his graduation is certain. However, the experts also discuss the possibility of forcing Margherita to pick a new nominator by kicking Cheryl out of rehab for her disrespectful behavior after the previous challenge, in what would have been a first for the series. Cheryl is ultimately allowed to stay, though she is given a warning over her attitude. Afterwards, Azim becomes the next graduate.
7	"1-2-3-Go!"	December 10, 2012
Three-Point Turning: A small turning space is set up using a variety of cars and the drivers are each given 30 minutes in which to pull off a three-point turn using a Jeep Wrangler.; Kevin takes the challenge first, repeatedly crashing into things and taking excessive steps due to lack of understanding the technique. He ultimately runs out of time, with his best performance being a five-point turn.; Flora takes Frank's advice to complete the challenge; however, she fails to complete the challenge with only a five-point turn at best.; Diane takes her first run by getting stuck due to having no plan in completing the challenge. During the second run, Stephane creates a solution that helps Diane pass the challenge, resulting in praise from Andrew. **Margherita is unhappy during the challenge, lacking effort in the challenge by repeatedly running into cars; she subsequently expresses frustration at Cheryl. After failing, Andrew advises her to talk to Shyamala, a notion she had refused until now.; Results: Best Performer: Diane, who had the only pass despite Stephane coaching her.; Worst Performer: Margherita struck at least one car per attempt, in addition to letting her frustration control her.; The Longest Reversing Challenge Ever: As the name suggests, this is the longest reversing challenge that has ever been featured on the show, with the drivers having to back up a BMW 540i (previously used as Margherita's car in the Gas Station challenge in Episode 5) for a full kilometre through a straight-line course made up of three sections; one lined with stacked wheel rims, one with cars, and one with plywood boxes and foam blocks.; Diane, despite knocking over nine wheel rims, doesn't strike any objects during the remainder of the course.; Kevin looks out the front windshield, despite Lenny repeatedly reminding him that he should be looking out the back; he subsequently strikes 23 objects.; Margherita drives through the course with no understanding of direction or strikes. She ultimately strikes 37 objects (before Andrew warns her that she will be disqualified from future challenges unless she has a discussion with Shyamala).; Flora becomes stuck on the course, forcing Andrew and Frank to clear the wheel rims from beneath the car. Flora then gets stuck a second time, requiring crew assistance to free the vehicle. (Andrew judged Flora's run to be the worst of the challenge due to her careless driving as a result.); Best Performer: Diane, who also had the only pass.; Worst Performer: Flora ended up being careless and never made an effort to go cleanly through the course, even if Margherita struck more things than anyone else in the group.; Mustang Challenge - Icy Corner: In one of the show's traditional challenges, the drivers are each tasked with approaching an icy corner at 40 km/h and applying and releasing their brakes in time to take the corner without skidding. Each driver will have five attempts.; Kevin drives at double the requested speed and crashes into the wall on his first attempt. On his second attempt, he focuses excessively on his speedometer, failing to look ahead or brake before hitting the wall. On his remaining three attempts, Kevin drives too slowly and consistently exhibits target fixation by staring directly at the wall instead of looking toward the exit.; On her first attempt, Diane executes the maneuver too late and clips the wall after being distracted by Stephane reading the speedometer. (With Stephane remaining silent on her second attempt, she passes with ease.); Margherita passes the challenge on her first attempt following a stress-management session with Shyamala.; Flora crashes into the wall on her first attempt due to excessive speed and target fixation. On her second attempt, she executes the maneuver correctly, but her speeding results in the wall being clipped again. Flora eventually controls her speed on her final run, but she fails to release the brake or look away from the wall, causing extensive damage to the course.; Results: Best Performer: Margherita, who passed on her first try.; Worst Performer: Kevin, who went nearly double the speed, never looked where he wanted to go and released the break. (Flora also did poorly, but was slower than Kevin.); When meeting with the experts, Kevin asks to be considered for graduation, but the idea is immediately rejected. In contrast to Kevin, Flora is more realistic about her chances and admits she may be Canada's Worst Driver. Margherita feels that she's ready to graduate, while Diane is unsure. With Kevin and Flora unlikely to graduate, the decision comes down to Diane and Margherita; Diane's lack of enthusiasm over graduating combined with a feeling that Margherita is more technically skilled leads to Tim, Philippe and Shyamala voting for her to graduate. Andrew and Cam are adamant that, despite her lack of enthusiasm, Diane is a much better driver overall and that Margherita is not ready to graduate. However, they are unable to convince the others, leading to Margherita being the penultimate graduate, sending Diane into the finale with Kevin and Flora. Andrew tells Margherita that he disagrees with Tim's, Shyamala's and Phillipe's decision, yet congratulates her on having improved significantly (as she had been one of the worst drivers in rehab during the first few episodes, especially the worst during the Three-Point Turn).
8	"Trophy Please..."	December 17, 2012
The Forward and Reverse Slalom: For this challenge, the drivers are placed at the wheel of the Ford Crown Victoria "taxicab" previously used in the Distracted Driving challenge (with the other two candidates as their passengers) and given the task of driving forwards and then in reverse through slalom course containing six foam people. Each driver will have ten attempts to complete the course in less than 50 seconds.; Kevin drives too fast and holds the steering wheel awkwardly, resulting in him striking a foam figure on his first attempt. After being advised by Andrew to go slower and correct his grip, Kevin quickly masters the forward section, but constantly hits the obstacles and destroys the car's front bumper while reversing.; Diane immediately aces the forward section, but ends up clipping a foam figure on her first attempt at the reverse section, caused by Kevin's constant fidgeting. After swapping Flora (which also gives the car a better weight distribution), she passes on her second attempt.; Flora takes two attempts to get the forward section right, before repeatably going off the tarmac all together for her remaining attempts, leading Andrew to believe her status as Canada's Worst Driver is certain.; Results: Best Performer: Diane, who had the only pass on this challenge with her second attempt.; Worst Performer: Even though Kevin and Flora both fail, Flora is deemed the worst for never coming close to passing and hit either an obstacle or went off the road.; Mustang Challenge - The Mega-Challenge: This year's Mega-Challenge is a full kilometre in length and, as in most previous years, consists of elements from many of this year's challenges. It begins with the drivers having to go through five Eye of the Needle arches, then having to swerve and avoid a foam pedestrian, before having to drive forwards and then backwards through a lengthy course of wheel rims. The drivers then have to do a reverse flick and then end the run with a handbrake J-turn.; Flora strikes all arches in the Eye of the Needle section before striking the foam pedestrian. She does poorly during the wheel rim track in both directions, takes her reverse flick early, and then fails to turn during final J-turn, crashing through both the foam version of herself that serves as an obstacle and the outer wall. (She finishes with 24 hits.); Diane drives too fast, striking most of the arches on the opening run, (though she avoids the foam pedestrian). After a smooth run through the wheel rim segment, she takes her reverse spin-out, but clips the far wall. On the final J-turn segment, Diane clips the foam version of herself (foam Diane), then leaves the course all together. (Andrew admits that he thought she'd do better, but, despite finishing with 23 hits, he claims she is a much better driver.); Kevin also drives too fast on the first straight; he avoids striking the first three arches, but then destroys the last two. On the wheel rim section, he manages to wedge himself on the rims during the reverse part, requiring Andrew to free the car. On the reverse spin-out, Kevin crashes off-course. When doing the final J-turn, Kevin forgets how to do the manoeuvre by striking the footbrake instead of applying the handbrake, losing control and driving off the course for a second time; he ends with 73 strikes. (After his Mega Challenge, Andrew notes Kevin's Mega Challenge as the worst-ever Mega Challenge run, surpassing both Shelby D'Souza from the third season and Canada's Worst Driver 5 "winner" Angelina Marcantognini.); Results: Best Performer: Diane, although she only fully passed one portion of the Mega Challenge with 23 hits. Flora only struck 24 while proclaiming herself to be Canada's Worst Driver.; Worst Performer: Kevin, who carelessly struck 70+ obstacles (prompting Andrew to say Kevin might be Canada's Worst Driver).; Road Test: For the second season in a row, drivers must navigate a course involving 29 turns through Hamilton, Ontario, this time in a Ford Mustang convertible, with the beginning and ending at Gore Park, since the Ford Mustang GT is no longer road-worthy.; Diane does flawlessly (aside from going slightly too slow on the Chedoke Expressway) in what Andrew describes as the best Road Test performance in the show's history, surpassing Arun Suryanarayanan from the fifth season. During the run, Diane discusses the confidence she has gained from being on the show and even admits that it has improved her relationship with Stephane, a comment Cam notes is "the best compliment the rehab centre has ever gotten."; Flora makes several mistakes: stopping at every intersection (even when the lights are on green), failing to signal, making prohibited turns, making turns from the wrong lane, driving into oncoming traffic, and driving head-on into the MacNab Bus Terminal. She takes two attempts to get on the Chedoke Expressway, missing her first attempt after initial anxiety. Her actual run on the highway proves normal, except for driving below the speed limit.; Kevin has the last run; his mistakes he makes are roughly the same as Flora's: making turns from the wrong lane and cutting off other drivers, to be specific. Andrew also notices that Kevin drifts between lanes and often only looks in one direction while driving. Like Flora before him, Kevin's highway run also goes without major incident. By the end, however, Andrew asks Kevin if Kevin himself should be driving.; Results: Best Performer: Diane, who does not make any moving violation during the final drive.; Worst Performer: Both Flora and Kevin did poorly, but Flora's performance involved making more basic mistakes than Kevin.; Diane becomes the final graduate, with Andrew and the panel describing her as a "model student." For Kevin and Flora, both are deemed incompetent to drive by the experts, yet both are adamant that they will never give up their licenses.: In the final discussion: Tim and Philippe deem Kevin to be the worst, feeling that while Kevin and Flora are equally bad overall, Flora has a very slim chance of improving someday; however, Kevin's missing eye has proved to be an insurmountable problem on top of his existing issues.; Cam and Shyamala deem Flora to be the worse of the two, feeling that she showed a dismissive attitude toward the entire process and that Flora made no real attempt to improve her driving (while Kevin had at least put some effort into the city drive despite his missing right eye).; Andrew is left with the deciding vote, but he notes on the difficulty of actually deciding who is worse: Both passed just two challenges over the course of the whole season; Both have nominators who tend to exacerbate their problems (Lenny by being too lenient, and Frank by constantly interfering with Flora's driving and giving her bad advice).; Flora did worse on the Slalom Challenge and Kevin worse on the Mega-Challenge.; Both fared equally poorly (in slightly different ways, as Phillipe stated) on the final Road Test.; As a result, both Kevin and Flora are named Canada's Worst Driver (Kevin becomes the fourth man and Flora becomes the fifth woman), with Andrew giving each a separate part of the trophy and implying that, had either volunteered to give up their license, they would have avoided the title.
