= Canada's Worst Driver 3 =

- Season 3
- No. of episodes: 8

Release
- Original network: Discovery Channel
- Original release: October 29 – December 17, 2007

Season chronology
- ← Previous; Canada's Worst Driver 2 Next → Canada's Worst Driver 4

Canada's Worst Driver 3 is the third season of the Canadian reality TV show Canada's Worst Driver, which aired on the Discovery Channel. As with previous years, eight people, nominated by their family or friends, enter the Driver Rehabilitation Centre to improve their driving skills. This year, the Driver Rehabilitation Centre is located at the Edgar Adult Occupation Centre, a radar station in Edgar, Ontario, that was sold in 1964 and later used as an institution for developmentally disabled or handicapped adults until it closed in 1999. Unlike the two previous seasons, however, when the focus was on Winter Driving and Summer Driving, respectively, the focus of this season was on Extreme Driving, in the hope that knowledge of these techniques (which is not normally taught to driving students) will help them become more confident and competent at the wheel. Also, for the second year in a row, the Driver Rehabilitation Program is one week shorter (this is due to Billie-Jean Leslie graduating in the fifth episode after the experts believed Shelby D'Souza, who would have graduated that episode, would benefit more from staying in rehab, a decision that later proved costly, as he ended up failing to graduate in the final episode). Also unlike the two previous seasons, the contestants' driver's licenses are confiscated instead of their keys. The initial drive started in Mariposa Beach, Ontario, and the final road test occurred in Barrie, Ontario.

== Experts ==
Two experts return from Canada's Worst Driver 2, though Marcus Agyeman and Juliana Chiovitti, insurance broker and performance driving instructor, respectively, from the past season, are not among them.

- Cam Woolley, a traffic sergeant with the Ontario Provincial Police who has seen the habits of Canadian drivers change drastically since 2000, with the most common offence having changed from DUI to distracted driving.
- Philippe Létourneau, a high-performance driving instructor with the Jim Russell Racing School, having been also featured on Discovery's Star Racer series. He is also a lead driving instructor for BMW Driver Training and the "Ferrari Driving Experience" at the Mont Tremblant race track. Philippe has enjoyed a successful career with over 40 podium finishes in 120 race starts.
- Dr. Louisa Gembora, a psychologist who worked at the Hamilton Psychiatric Hospital in Hamilton, Ontario, before moving on to private practice in 1994. She drives a race car in her spare time.
- Scott Marshall, the show's head driving instructor, a position he has held since 2005. He was also director of training for Young Drivers of Canada.

== Contestants ==
- Shelby D'Souza, 30 and licensed for four years, from Calgary, Alberta, is an overly cautious forklift operator, to the point in which he spends five seconds facing a green light before moving his car... and even then, he drives slowly. In sharp contrast to road rage, he is far too generous at the wheel and his younger brother, Elerick D'Souza, believes that he will be rear-ended in an accident soon before he can change his ways. He drives a beige Chevrolet Blazer and drove a beige Mazda Protege to the rehab centre.
- Thomas Hobbs, 21, from Lloydminster, Alberta, is an aspiring street racer who has claimed to have gone at over 240 km/h on a highway. Thomas is constantly taking risks behind the wheel, enjoying life on the fast line. He is nominated by his older sister, Lenora Hobbs, because she does not believe that he is in control of his car. He drives a gray GMC Sierra 2500 and drove a blue Ford Explorer to the rehab centre.
- Denice Koke, 33, from Cranbrook, British Columbia, is an emotional wreck at the wheel and believes that this is the reason that she is too reliant on nominator and husband, Henry Koke, a truck driver, for their family activities. She believes that this is interfering in her children's lives, especially her son, who had to be pulled out of a local hockey league because she was not confident driving him to games. She drives a red Dodge Grand Caravan.
- Jennifer Kritzer, 22, from Hamilton, Ontario, is a floral delivery driver who is also extremely accident-prone, proudly admitting to being involved in a large number of hit-and-run accidents. She is nominated by her boyfriend, Jon Park, who later committed suicide in 2014. She drives a silver Ford Focus.
- Billie-Jean Leslie, 22 and licensed for four years, from Saanich, British Columbia, is a student and hairdresser. She is portrayed as being more interested in looking good than looking at the road, using her car's mirrors mostly for applying makeup and has on numerous occasions changed clothes while at the wheel, all of which lead to 16 accidents since getting her license, including 12 in a single year and four license suspensions (her choice of stiletto shoes is also an issue). She is nominated by her cousin, Nicola Coulter. She drives a gray Mazda 323 and drove a beige Mitsubishi Lancer to the rehab centre.
- Marnie Maddison, 41, from Calgary, Alberta, is extremely nervous at the wheel and not confident in going anywhere other than her workplace, preferring to starve over driving to the grocery store. Because of this, she is on her eighth learner's permit in 22 years and has never mustered the confidence to take a final road test. Worse yet, she has no one to turn to, as her boyfriend and nominator, Bruce Toye, is frequently out of town in his job as an airline pilot. She drives a silver Honda Civic and drove a silver Ford Taurus to the rehab centre.
- Edward "Ed" Porter, 43, from Ottawa, Ontario, is a biologist with an extreme road rage problem, which has torn apart his relationship with his nominator and ex-girlfriend, Elizabeth Cecchi. He enters rehabilitation in an effort to address his road rage, which causes their children to vomit whenever he is driving, but also as a step towards reconciliation of their broken common-law relationship. He drives a black Saturn Ion and drove a green Ford Focus to the rehab centre.
- Jason Zhang, 42, from Vancouver, British Columbia, is a travel consultant who, when driving, has a case of "extreme tunnel vision," making him unable to see what's around or directly in front of him. Because of this, he relishes gridlock (due to it being slow) and always parks in the most expensive parking stalls to avoid others. He is nominated by his husband, Adrian Fehr. He drives a silver Honda Civic and drove a blue Ford Focus to the rehab centre.

== Synopsis ==
Contestant	1	2	3	4	5	6	7
Jason Zhang	IN	IN	IN	IN	IN	IN	CWD
Shelby D'Souza	IN	IN	IN	IN	IN	IN	RUNNER-UP
Jennifer Kritzer	IN	IN	IN	IN	IN	IN	OUT
Ed Porter	IN	IN	IN	IN	IN	OUT	
Billie-Jean Leslie	IN	IN	IN	IN	OUT		
Marnie Maddison	IN	IN	IN	OUT			
Thomas Hobbs	IN	IN	OUT				
Denice Koke	IN	OUT					

(CWD) The contestant became Canada's Worst Driver.
(RUNNER-UP) The contestant was runner-up for Canada's Worst Driver.
(OUT) The contestant graduated.
(IN) The contestant was shortlisted for graduation.

== Episodes ==
No.	Title	Original release date
1	"Rock Bottom"	October 29, 2007
The Drive to Rehab: This season, the journey to the Driver Rehabilitation Centre starts from a granite quarry (signifying "rock bottom") in Mariposa Beach, Ontario, with the eight contestants heading to rehab using a provided set of instructions, a journey that Andrew notes should take an average driver with good knowledge of directions like himself an hour to complete. The contestants first drive 40 km (25 mi) following a list of 20 turns to Carthew Bay, a convenience store on Lakeshore Road East in Orillia, Ontario, take a map and follow the directions another 20 km (12 mi) to the Edgar Adult Occupational Centre, a vocational school that closed down in 1999, where the contestants will have their drivers' licenses confiscated. The contestants depart in the following order: Jason, Marnie, Shelby, Jennifer, Denice, Billie-Jean, Thomas and Ed. Jason gets off to a slow start (stopping and going on the road out of the quarry), narrowly missing his first stop sign, while Marnie is nervous because there may be left turns without "flashers" (i.e. having to turn left while traffic in the opposite direction is going) and Shelby quickly gets himself lost. Jennifer and Denice are the next ones out. By the time Billie-Jean leaves, Jason has already reached the convenience store. Thomas is the next to leave and tries to get there as quickly as possible, even though he contends that it is not a race. He does manage to pass Billie-Jean and Jason (who had since fallen behind) in the effort to get ahead. Ed is the last person to leave the quarry. Everyone makes a large number of moving violations on the way to rehab and the contestants arrive in the following order: Thomas (who committed 67 speeding violations), Jason (who had fallen behind when Thomas passed him), Ed, Marnie (who drove 64 km (40 mi) off course), Shelby (who went 69 km (43 mi) off course and took over three hours), Billie-Jean (who looked in her rear-view mirror 14 times), Jennifer (who took over four hours and committed a long list of moving violations, enough to lose her license) and Denice (who made 85 self-deprecating comments).; First to Arrive: Thomas was the first to arrive.; Last to Arrive: Denice was the last.; Slowest to Arrive: Jennifer was the slowest to arrive. During her drive, she committed a long list of moving violations, including crossing the centre line at least ten times, enough to lose her license. She arrived at four hours.; Fastest to Arrive: Thomas was the second-last to leave, but the fastest to arrive, but not before committing 67 speed violations while passing Billie-Jean and Jason.; Reversing Race: In the first proper challenge, held at Barrie Speedway, the contestants each take one lap around the track in stock cars while driving in reverse, in front of a racecar audience. Marnie races against Ed in the first heat, followed by Billie-Jean against Jason in the second heat, while Jennifer races against Thomas and Denice against Shelby. Though there were three disqualifications (Ed for fishtailing out of control on the first turn of the oval track, Marnie for completely letting go of the wheel and Jason because Adrian grabbed the steering wheel), while Thomas finishes with the fastest time. Surprisingly, Jennifer, who has a fear of driving in reverse, finishes second, followed by Shelby, Billie-Jean and Denise, who overcame her desire to vomit while actually racing.; Fastest Performer: Thomas performed the fastest at :40.; Slowest Performer: Denice performed the slowest at :59, although Ed, Marnie and Jason were all disqualified for fishtailing out of control, completely letting go of the wheel and Adrian grabbing the steering wheel, respectively.; Skills Evaluation: In the second challenge, the drivers must reverse a Ford Mustang out of a garage (with little room for maneuvering), down a driveway, up and down a ramp, before heading forwards at 30 km/h in a giant slalom-like course, stopping so that their car straddles a red line painted at the ground. Following the slalom portion, the drivers must use precision driving to move slowly through an obstacle course before reversing and parking at a nearby parking space. Marnie is first to take the challenge, requiring 131 attempts (and a crew-assisted reset) merely to leave the driveway, while Denice hits 34 things and takes 57 minutes. Ed hits 54 things, although his driving most certainly wasn't helped by Elizabeth's screaming and incorrect assumption that Ed was speeding on the slalom. Billie-Jean is the first to check her mirrors, although this does absolutely nothing to help her, as she hits 46 things, mainly due to speeding. Thomas is next and, despite a strong start, hits 24 things, mainly due to the same reason Billie-Jean hit 46 things during hers—speeding. Jason has the biggest problem of all the drivers—a passenger who won't stop grabbing the wheel. Jennifer and Shelby fare arguably the worst in this challenge, as both completely destroy the precision driving portion of the course while attempting to stop after the slalom (being unable to brake)-- furthermore, Jennifer, who finished with 31 hits, had accelerated into the obstacles—something she has done at home and fled the scene, a felony which Andrew states is incriminating evidence and Sgt. Cam states is a criminal offense in all of Canada—while Shelby, who finished with 17 hits in two seconds and unable to complete the challenge, had been clocked under the required speed in the slalom.
2	"Car Confidential"	November 5, 2007
Burning Out: After each contestant (except Thomas, who refused) was given a lesson on how to do burnouts and donuts by Philippe, each contestant must maintain a ten-second burnout and then perform a full-circle wide donut around a foam figure before driving out of the area. By refusing the lesson, Thomas, who did the challenge successfully after five attempts, automatically fails the challenge. Jason and Marnie fail due to hitting the foam figure, while the surprises in the challenge were Shelby (who did it on his first try) and Denice (who, despite having spent an hour on the challenge and nearly breaking down every time, first from lapping instead of making donuts and later from nearly hitting concrete obstacles, managed to gain the confidence she needs, though she fails the challenge). Billie-Jean was also notable in taking an entire night to do the challenge, having made donuts while circling around the figure, but not a wide donut all the way around.; Eye of the Needle: In this year's edition of the perennial traditional challenge, the drivers must go through a series of foam archways which are only half a lane wide (i.e. with only 20 cm (7.9 in) clearance on either side of the car) while having to maintain a speed of over 40 km/h. Unlike previous seasons, they are forced to retry the course if they hit an archway or fail to maintain speed, up to a maximum of five attempts. Billie-Jean, Denice and Jennifer all managed to finish in only two attempts (with both Billie-Jean and Denice having barely missed the speed requirement and Jennifer having clipped the passenger-side mirror), while it took Thomas (who boasted that he could maintain 60 km/h) three attempts (his jerky deceleration having cut his speed to under 40 km/h in his first two attempts and he hit an arch) and Shelby took four attempts (his first three were well under the limit). Marnie quits the challenge after four attempts, while Jason failed all five attempts. Despite having revealed that he has a case of tunnel vision even when wearing glasses and that the challenge was even possible, Ed also manages to successfully finish.; Broken Hearts: In this year's variation of the figure-eight challenge, the contestants pair off, both starting at one-end of a figure-eight course and having to reverse through it, where the midpoint and a spot at the other end of the figure-eight course are the only passing points. Unlike previous years, though, the loops are slightly elongated so as to create a heart shape. Thomas and Jennifer are the first pairing, while Jason and Shelby go second. Billie-Jean and Ed are third, while Denice and Marnie make up the final heat. Thomas is by far the best driver, being both the fastest and hitting the fewest obstacles (two), but Jennifer gets her car stuck in between two car obstacles. Similarly, Shelby gets his car stuck, although he is courteous in allowing Jason to move right through the midway point when he pulls past the passing point (Shelby also finishes, but only through forcibly getting himself free). Although Ed focuses on finishing the challenge the best way possible, Elizabeth is frustrated at Ed's courteousness to Billie-Jean and is even more frustrated when he allows her to overtake him at the halfway point and finish faster, even though she hit 25 things. Denice and Marnie nearly break down over their significant others and Andrew steps in to force the nominators to switch cars slightly after the midway point. Because of this, even though the contestants end up hitting dramatically fewer obstacles, the damage was already done, as by the time they finish, Denice still hits 78 things and Marnie 71 (57 with Bruce at her side and only 14 with Henry in the passenger seat).; In deliberation, the experts and Andrew were deadlocked as to whom to graduate. Andrew and Scott preferred Billie-Jean, while Sgt. Cam and Phillipe preferred Denice. Dr. Gembora's first vote as a judge ends up being the deciding one, as she votes in Denice's favour and she becomes the first graduate of the third season.
3	"Cool Bus"	November 12, 2007
Cool Bus: In Canada, one cannot legally drive a school bus with a regular G Class license (in Ontario, a school bus requires a B Class License) unless the bus was not labeled as such and all but four seats were removed. In this challenge, after everyone is given lessons on parallel parking, the contestants must reverse the "Cool Bus" down a street littered with cars and rims before parallel parking the bus on the left side of a hill. Jennifer nearly breaks down in the challenge, but ends up finishing the challenge with a perfect run (her time is not shown). Parallel parking is also not a problem for Thomas or Billie-Jean (the latter of whom learned to use her mirrors and, more amazingly, never parallel-parked before, having "flirted" her way out of parallel parking in her driving test, as Nicola pointed out to Andrew), though both do hit obstacles (Thomas' time is not shown), as does Ed and Marnie, with Elizabeth wanting to quit rehab after Andrew asks if she might be part of Ed's road rage problem, which would have either left Ed without a nominator for the remainder of rehab or led to Ed being expelled from rehab if Elizabeth cancelled their shared insurance policy by quitting (which would have made Ed the second contestant to be expelled after Colin Sheppard from the previous season, although Colin was expelled for an unwillingness to learn, but it would have made Ed the first to be expelled if Elizabeth cancelled their shared insurance policy instead of Danny Bridgman, who would cancel his shared insurance policy in the sixth season, resulting in Scott Schurink getting expelled, as his $15,000 insurance cost was too prohibitively expensive to insure himself). At the other end of the spectrum, Jason and Shelby had to have their courses modified so that all the obstacles were removed—Jason from frustration and wanting to quit rehab (which would have made him the first contestant in any Worst Driver series to quit and, as a result, leave without his license) and Shelby (despite his dreams of driving a bus one day) from having moved only 10-foot (3.0 m) after 30 minutes of driving the bus and causing over $12,000 in damages.; Fastest Performer: Jennifer performed the fastest, although her time was not shown.; Slowest Performer: Billie-Jean performed the slowest at 45:08.; Best Performer: Jennifer, despite having a near meltdown, was the only one who didn't hit anything.; Worst Performer: Jason and Shelby were the worst, to the point both had the course modified so that all the obstacles were removed (and even then, they still hit things).; Swerve and Avoid: The contestants are in a car that lacks anti-lock brakes for a simple accident avoidance course—they must accelerate to 50 km/h before crossing a yellow line, where they must engage the brakes. When they reach a fork in the road, both of which have obstacles, one will move aside. The drivers must then recover from the skid and drive through their opening to safety. The drivers have up to five attempts to finish this task. Billie-Jean gets this on her first try, while developing a habit (from the previous episode) of wearing flats (her "driving shoes") instead of the stilettos she normally wears. Thomas, no stranger to swerving, also finishes on his first try. Marnie and Shelby take multiple attempts to finish, as does Jason (a far cry from wanting to quit in the previous challenge), while Ed (due to his tunnel vision problem preventing him from seeing which exit had opened up) and Jennifer (out of frustration) do not finish at all.; Best Performer: Thomas and Billie-Jean were the only two people to pass this challenge, with Thomas doing slightly better.; Worst Performer: Ed and Jennifer were the worst, due to his tunnel vision and her frustration, respectively.; Road Signs: Scott gives a simple quiz on their knowledge of road signs. Thomas answers all 13 signs correctly (joining Robert "Bob" Coad from the first season and Sean McConnell from the previous season as the only contestants to answer every road sign quiz correctly; Bob was quizzed on five road signs, while Sean was quizzed on seven), while Jason only manages four (while still believing he got 11).; Canada's Worst Parking Lot: In the annual parking lot challenge, the seven contestants are given seven cars and must park in whatever parking stalls are available. However, any moving violation (including hitting other cars, parking so that the car is not between the lines or parking in no-parking zones) will result in the contestant penalized by being forced to drive out of the parking lot and take a penalty lap. As the challenge goes on, blocker cars (which include the Cool Bus) will also attempt to either serve as moving obstacles or park momentarily in one of the available stalls. As the challenge starts, Jason is the first to be penalized by inadvertently backing into Marnie out of the gate. Billie-Jean is the first to park (the only one to do so before any blocker vehicles appear), followed by Ed when Jason is forced to take a penalty lap when he hits a car while backing into a stall. When Ed is asked to take the role of a blocker, it allows Thomas to back into the stall he vacates, making him the third to park. Shelby (assisted by Nicola from outside the car) parks next and does so without taking a penalty lap, while Jason finally finds a spot to parallel park. In the battle for the final parking spot, Marnie (having taken nine penalty laps already, two from simultaneously parking in a no parking stall while one tire was over the line) is in the best position to take it... until she hits a barrel and is forced to take a tenth penalty lap, giving Jennifer the opening needed to steal the spot, leaving Marnie out of luck.; In deliberation, the experts were favoring Thomas for his skill level being far above the rest (but believing that Thomas has still learned nothing besides the consequences of his street racing from Sgt. Cam, in which life imprisonment is a distinct possibility), Billie-Jean for developing the habit of driving with flats instead of stilettos (and having dramatically improved results therein) and making use of mirrors and Marnie for improvements in confidence (despite few challenges being completed). In the end, Andrew, with a racing helmet and a pair of scissors, gives Thomas a choice to either take the racing helmet and be the second graduate or choose the scissors and be expelled. Thomas makes the right choice, but instead of leaving in his car (as is the norm for all graduates), he is taken back to the Barrie Speedway, where he partakes (and wins) in his first race on a track. According to Thomas, the experience from being at the track alone (let alone racing) is well worth the trip to rehab, as he vows to never street race again.
4	"Skid Marks"	November 19, 2007
The Balance-Beam for Unbalanced Drivers: In one of the most heavily hyped challenges of the season, two cars, controlled by a contestant in one and their nominator in the other, must try to balance the cars out on a teeter-totter rig. The cars are mic'd up to each other to facilitate communication and a complex rail and chain system prevents the cars from hitting each other or go off the teeter-totter. Ed and Elizabeth, in a surprising show of patience, manage to balance out the fastest. Shelby and Billie-Jean also manage to balance out after a lot of work (humorously, Andrew was seated in Billie-Jean's car and was forced out in order to get the cars to balance out), as does Jennifer after watching Jon adjust and laughing in the meantime for half her run. Neither Jason (with Andrew seated in his car) nor Marnie (who didn't even realize her parking brake was still on until after 21 minutes) finish the challenge, as both pairs had given up after about an hour.; Driving on Ice: To simulate the icy conditions of winter within the summer driving season, a hydraulic skid car is employed. The hydraulic car is set to raise one end of the car via remote control. After being given skid car instructions by 28-year veteran ice driving instructor John Powell, the contestants take on a simple challenge in the skid car: they must simply go downhill in the skid car in what is more or less a straightaway in park in front of a wall, being fully aware that the skid car may activate during the trip (the twist is, of course, that it will not activate at any point during the run). Marnie (who took the longest to learn in the lesson), confident in her belief that any skid on ice will result in a car crash, is completely surprised at the result—a perfect run, showing that she needn't drive in fear of an ice skid. The single run shoots her confidence through the roof. As for Jason (the only other driver whose run is shown), he believes that he would skid into the wall and thus accelerates into the wall to regain control, destroying the skid car and terminating the challenge.; Parking Cross: In a simple challenge, a car is situated within a small cross and the challenge is to park in the four arms of the cross, which can be done in at least 29 turns. Marnie is surprisingly the fastest at the run and Billie-Jean puts up another strong performance. Ed once again lets his aggression gets the best of him, while Jennifer nearly breaks down. Jason's biggest challenge is not to let Adrian get the best of him (which he clearly fails at, as of the 42 orders he received, 23 were wrong), while Shelby's run is none too spectacular.; Fastest Performer: Marnie performed the fastest at 13:11.; Slowest Performer: Jennifer performed the slowest at 46:52.; Riding a Bike: Scott has always compared driving to riding a bike. The fact that Shelby has had no experience in riding a bike leads Andrew to teach him. Although he struggles to ride with the training wheels off, after two hours and 18 minutes, Shelby has achieved his only other lifelong dream.; Stick-Shift Driving: In this simple driving challenge, after being given a lesson on stick-shift driving by Scott, the contestants must take a standard transmission car and drive it up a straightaway (peppered with stops), perform a three-point turn and back down the same straightaway. Three of the remaining contestants have experience in driving stick-shift and for Marnie, it shows as she scores a near-perfect run (hitting obstacles only at the very last part of the return leg due to poor cornering). Ed and Billie-Jean are the other two, although Ed quickly gets into anger-trouble (elbowing Elizabeth at the turn) while Billie-Jean stalls her car as she makes the turn, starting off a dangerous chain reaction in her behaviour. Adrian also has experience in stick-shift, but it does not pass onto Jason as he hits obstacles and stalls the car repeatedly in his run, nearly breaking down on the return leg. Jennifer breaks down and needs a smoke break at the turn, while Shelby burns out his clutch in his car, forcing him to redo the challenge in a backup car (which was also used by four other contestants). He stalls the car 38 times in the new car and nearly burns out the clutch there as well.; Best Performer: Marnie nearly had a perfect run, only hitting obstacles at the end.; Worst Performer: Shelby did the worst, killing the clutch in the first car and nearly burning out the clutch in the second car.; Again, the experts are split at the end of the episode. Sgt. Cam and Andrew are both confident that Billie-Jean, having been passed over twice already, has shown repeatedly what it takes to graduate. However, Phillippe and Dr. Gembora prefer Marnie's dramatic improvement from the previous episode, leaving Scott to cast the deciding vote and while he would rather graduate both, he's pressured by Andrew into choosing one, so he casts the deciding vote for Marnie, resulting in Billie-Jean being passed over for the third straight episode on the grounds that someone else had a breakout performance.
5	"Bumpy Road Ahead"	November 26, 2007
Handbrake J-Turn: After high-performance instructor Phillipe Létourneau gives everyone lessons on how to do a 180° handbrake skid turn from driving straight ahead at 40 km/h, the contestants must attempt to perform this maneuver within limited confines. Shelby does this on his second attempt, while for Ed, it takes six attempts, largely because he had used the footbrakes instead. For everyone else, this takes four attempts—Jason because of turning too soon or too late, Jennifer over using the footbrakes instead of the hand brake and Billie-Jean because of not looking where she wanted to go.; S-Bend Race: In the Broken Hearts challenge, a frustrated Jennifer had asked for instructions on how to move the car laterally, but nevertheless got herself stuck. In this challenge, the method to do so, known as the S-bend, will be given to everyone. The contestants must use the S-bend to maneuver their car sideways towards a concrete barrier and then back towards their starting point. Contestants will be racing against each other and each car has paint rollers mounted so as to clearly see contact with the barriers on the three closed-off sides. Jason has the privilege of being the odd-man out, driving as Andrew demonstrates the challenge. He is also the fastest to finish at 12 minutes and is grateful for the show staff not allowing him to give up driving during the Cool Bus challenge. Shelby, racing against Jennifer is the slowest at the challenge, having taken 30 minutes to drive off of the starting position (because he turned forward and reversed the way he came, a move that had been done many times by Shelby before and had affectionately been given the name "sawing the bow") and another 30 minutes to finish after doing this. He also had the most paint contacts with 12, a far cry from everyone else (Jason had none, while Jennifer had only one).; Driving Off-Road: In this challenge, purposely built by the Central Ontario 4×4 Club, the drivers must take an off-road truck and drive through several off-road obstacles (such as a series of pits, a rock garden and over branches), which includes a series of hairpin turns. At the end of the course, they must reverse through it back to the starting point. Ed is the first to go and, unlike previous challenges, keeps his cool as Elizabeth is screaming and makes an acceptable run. In another twist, the contestant will be in the passenger seat of the contestant following them (instead of their nominators, as with Elizabeth with Ed). Each contestant will also pass on a piece of safety advice when doing this challenge—driving the challenge with their thumbs up (as jerky movement will cause thumb injury). Ed (who was given the advice by Andrew) does this to Jason, whose run was acceptable, but Jason forgets the safety message as Shelby takes the wheel. Shelby has the worst (as in most reckless) run of the day (although Jason breaks the driver-side mirror in three places during his run, causing $360 in damages and resulting in 21 years of bad luck) and convinces Jennifer that her run is better than his (although her reverse run goes off-course on several occasions). Billie-Jean, going last, has the best run of the day, patient in both directions.; Best Performer: Billie-Jean's patience pays off in this challenge, finishing with the best run of the day.; Slowest Performer: Shelby did the worst statistically, although Jason caused the most damage.; The Water-Tank Challenge: In the annual tradition, the contestants must go through an obstacle course with a roof-mounted water tank filled with 200 litres (53 US gal) of water. If the contestants do not brake smoothly, the contents of the water tank will drain though a series of tubes leading to the occupants inside the car. This year's twist, however, is that at the end of the obstacle course is a high-speed portion: the drivers must slowly accelerate up to 30 km/h and slowly brake. Only Jason is prepared for the challenge (himself and Adrian having worn a shower cap), largely because he has to repeat the acceleration portion five times, either because of not keeping up speed or hitting a side barrier while accelerating, but still loses over 100 litres (26 US gal) of water, yet he still thinks he's graduating. Shelby loses 25 litres (6.6 US gal) of water, but makes the serious mistake of leaving the car in drive while he exits the car to remove an obstacle that had lodged itself under the car. Billie-Jean's jerky driving causes her makeup to run, resulting in 40 litres (11 US gal) of water lost, while Jennifer, wearing waterproof mascara, regretted her choice of clothes (a set of white pants that had gone translucent when wet); however, she lost 45 litres (12 US gal) of water. Ed's run had Elizabeth screaming repeatedly whenever he got wet, but again, he maintained composure and lost the least amount of water (only 20 litres (5.3 US gal)).; In deliberation, only Dr. Gembora had the dissenting opinion on who was the most improved driver, as the rest thought Shelby had improved the most. However, everyone agrees that this was not enough for Shelby to graduate, due to his horrible off-road challenge and his critical mistake in the Water Tank Challenge of leaving the car in drive. As a result, the choice to graduate was painfully obvious: Billie-Jean, shortlisted but passed over three times due to someone else having a breakout performance, gets her just reward as she graduates, having accomplished all her goals in rehab (this also marked the first—and, at the time, only—instance of a contestant graduating in the fifth episode).
6	"Unhappy Trails"	December 3, 2007
At the start of the episode, Andrew reiterates that the driver rehabilitation program has had a number of success stories-- Manuel Tejeda (from the previous season) has not hit a thing since leaving rehab (amounting to over two years and 15,000 km (9,300 mi) of driving), while Jodi Slobodesky (from the previous season) is now in a job where driving well is paramount—selling cosmetics door-to-door. Coincidentally, both had graduated in the second-to-last episode in their respective series. They were the only two drivers to graduate in the second-last episode of the previous two seasons, excluding Sean McConnell (as the second-last episode of Canada's Worst Driver 2 was, at the time, the only episode of Canada's Worst Driver in which two drivers graduated).: Trailer Ride: In Ontario, drivers may carry a trailer with a maximum height of 13 feet 6 inches (4.11 m). In this challenge, after each contestant was given lessons in trailer driving, the contestants must drive such a trailer (in the form of a giant pylon) through a hairpin turn, up a hill and then parallel park the vehicle (or reverse down the hill) when an oncoming emergency vehicle approaches. When the emergency vehicle passes, the contestants must continue up the hill and park in reverse in a parking space. Shelby is the best of the bunch, even though it still took him 15 minutes to parallel park, largely because he tells Elerick to get out of the car when he needs help. The rest of the contestants take over 30 minutes each to parallel park and Jason destroys his own trailer as he makes his final park.; Stopping: Andrew notes that Adrian is one of the most controlling husbands who have appeared on the show (compared to Allan Carson and Sam Slobodesky from the previous season), if not the most controlling. To show how much of an influence this can get on Jason (who wants to graduate this episode in order to return home in time for his sister-in-law's wedding), Scott monitors the pair as they try to brake from 40 km/h, with and without Adrian at the passenger seat. The conclusion is obvious: Jason is better off without Adrian at the wheel.; The Maze: In what's only the season's second navigation challenge, the contestants must navigate their car out of a maze. The contestants are given a map of the maze before the start of the challenge and they are free to make copies of the maze on paper before they begin. Ed is the fastest out of the maze and with the fewest hits-– mainly as Elizabeth had copied the maze diagram and navigated their way out-– though at the end, Ed was heading out of the maze in reverse. Jason and Jennifer (the only female nominee remaining after Billie-Jean graduated last episode) hit many things on their runs for different reasons (Adrian's involvement and Jennifer's ignorance of hits, respectively). Shelby mistrusts his meticulously drawn map and he gets stuck in the maze in the tightest of spaces—so much so that when he finally makes it out, the car engine starts to overheat.; The Slalom: After Phillippe gives instructions to everyone on how to do a slalom while maintaining 40 km/h (and their hands on the nine-and-three and why the traditional ten-and-two may cause injuries when combined with modern airbag technology), the contestants attempt to do the same thing—except that at the end of the course, there will be a flagbearer and if the flag is raised, the contestants are directed to not swerve around the obstacles until the flags are lowered. If they lose control of their car (either in swerving, hitting an obstacle or failing to maintain 40 km/h) or fail to obey the flag, they must reattempt the course again, up to a maximum of seven tries. Ed's peripheral vision issues prevent him from finishing this challenge, while Jason and Shelby fail in their seven attempts (Jason from failing to maintain speed, Shelby from impacts with the obstacles). Jennifer, believing that all hope was lost, manages to finish on her last attempt, saving this challenge from having a 100% failure rate.; In the end, Jason and Shelby are quickly ruled out as graduates—Jason, because often he didn't know which way his wheels were positioned and Shelby, because of the belief that he, in fact, got worse. The experts are split yet again on who should graduate—Dr. Gembora and Scott choosing Ed and Sgt. Cam and Andrew choosing Jennifer—leaving Phillippe with the deciding vote, in which he immediately decides that Ed, whose relationship with Elizabeth has gradually improved over the course of the season, should be the next graduate, not only ensuring that there will not be three men in the finale, but also sending Jennifer into the finale with Jason and Shelby, with Ed also admitting that he was not as good of a driver as he thought when he arrived and that alone has helped the couple reconcile.
7	"Road Tests"	December 10, 2007
Driving in a Straight Line: In the penultimate challenge, the drivers must drive in a straight line between two concrete barriers, and must reach 40 km/h at the end. All three contestants will be in the truck in each run. Shelby is the fastest to finish, relying on creeping slowly and then flooring to the finish. Jennifer struggles in her run, but takes advice from Shelby (to "put the hammer down, aim and go") and completes the challenge after 27 minutes and 20 attempts. Jason, wanting to quit again after just nine attempts, fails to finish after 67 minutes and 41 attempts.; The Mega-Challenge: Drivers must combine all of the skills that they have garnered in previous challenges for this challenge. There are four parts to the mega-challenge: in the first, the drivers must start with a peel-out into an abbreviated Eye of the Needle course, before proceeding to an accident avoidance portion. After this, they approach the giant pylon, where they must do a half-donut, before parking the car and changing to a standard transmission car for the second part, which consists of an off-road drive, complete with a hill and slowing/stopping portion. After this, the contestants switch to the third car for a precision driving course, which consists of driving forwards into a garage and making a tight turn out of a garage, before proceeding to finish the third portion of the mega-challenge in reverse. Finally, back in the original car, they must accelerate their car in a straight line up to 60 km/h before stopping right in front of the giant pylon. Jennifer is fastest to finish, but Shelby and Jason show the judges that they perhaps do not deserve to graduate.; Road Test: Drivers must navigate a course involving 35 turns through Barrie, Ontario in a mock road test, which Andrew also stresses will be done in his own truck, a 1998 Mazda B4000 (which Andrew reveals during Jason's drive is 15 years old). Shelby and Jennifer finish with four moving violations each (though Andrew jokingly describes Jennifer turning right through two traffic lanes into a Tim Hortons parking lot on Bayfield Street as just "being Canadian"), but Shelby travels far off course and takes 98 minutes to do a test that normally takes an hour. Jason had by far the worst performance: his fear of fast traffic meant that, when merging into Ontario Highway 400 (which Andrew points out as "one of the deadliest highways in Canada"), he ground to a complete halt. Furthermore, he misses Andrew's direction to exit at Duckworth Street and is forced to exit at Forbes Road to avoid driving all the way to Sudbury, Ontario (which would have forced Shelby to postpone his Road Test until the next day, as he would have been unable to drive at night) and get back on track. Jason's habit of turning off the motor at every stop is also duly noted by Andrew, as he tries to stop Jason from damaging his truck's starter.; In their final discussion, the experts immediately agree that while she still has some way to go, Jennifer is definitely not Canada's Worst Driver, as she improved the most out of the final three and learned to take responsibility for her actions, while neither Shelby nor Jason deserved to graduate. Jason is visibly defeated and says that he's considering giving up driving, while Shelby admits being disappointed with his final performance, but adds that he intends to continue driving and try to improve on his own. Though the experts briefly ponder the possibility of naming Shelby as the worst in the hope that he will also give up driving (an option Jason is already considering), Andrew reminds them that the show is about deciding who is Canada's Worst Driver and the experts quickly agree that, overall, Jason is clearly a worse driver than Shelby. Jason is therefore named Canada's Worst Driver, becoming the third person (second man) to be awarded the trophy and he accepts the decision, along with surrendering his driver's license in a clear case and also confirms that he will give up driving in the wake of the announcement. Because Adrian left the Rehabilitation Centre to make it to his sister's wedding after the Mega-Challenge, Jason gets a ride home from Shelby in the Cool Bus. It is also noted by Andrew that now that Jason has retired from driving, that technically makes Shelby, who therefore fails to graduate, "Canada's Worst Driver."
8: Why Accidents Happen	"101 Problems on Canadian Roads"	December 17, 2007
In this season's recap finale, Andrew explains how and why accidents happen on the road and how the eight contestants are affected by this information. Among the "top 101" problems being explored, only some 70 of which actually were aired and demonstrated by the drivers themselves-- street racing (Thomas), road rage (Ed), loss of bodily functions (Denice), using a car as a change room (Billie-Jean), inability to understand driving phrases (Jason didn't know what "acceleration" was, but did, however, stick to his vow to "get out of the driver's seat"), driving philosophy (Marnie), generosity (Shelby) and hit and run (Jennifer).

== Production ==
A national call for nominations was held in March and April 2007.

Filming was chiefly in Edgar, Ontario. It was reported that the remote township (with a population density of 40 people per square kilometre) was chosen to minimize risks of the participants colliding with residents.

== Release ==
The season premiered 29 October 2007 at 10 pm on Discovery Channel.
