= Canada's Worst Driver =

Canadian television show

- Canada's Worst Driver season one title card
- Written by: Andrew Younghusband
- Presented by: Andrew Younghusband
- Country of origin: Canada
- Original language: Canadian English
- No. of seasons: 14
- No. of episodes: 115

Production
- Executive producers: Andrew Younghusband; Lesia Capone; Blair Ricard
- Producers: Guy O'Sullivan (2005–2016); Blair Ricard; Jeff Cole
- Running time: 46 minutes (without commercials); 60 minutes (with commercials)
- Production companies: Proper Television; Discovery Canada

Original release
- Network: Discovery Channel
- Release: October 3, 2005 – December 17, 2018

Related
- Britain's Worst Driver; Canada's Worst Handyman; Blood, Sweat & Tools; Don't Drive Here; De slechtste chauffeur van Nederland

Canada's Worst Driver is a Canadian television series that aired on Discovery Channel from 2005 to 2018, based on Britain's Worst Driver. It and sister series Canada's Worst Handyman (2006-2011) are the two highest-rated programs on Discovery Channel. The series was produced by Proper Television whose president, Guy O'Sullivan, was the director for the original Britain's Worst Driver series; as such, Canada's Worst Driver is considered to be the production company's flagship show. Unlike other Worst Driver series around the world, the Canadian version emphasizes the learning process of the contestants and the science of driving; as such, it is often more serious than the other Worst Driver shows, which are mainly played for laughs. It is the second-longest running of any Worst Driver series to date with 14 seasons and 115 episodes (assuming specials are included; only Finland's Suomen surkein kuski has run longer). The series was hosted by Andrew Younghusband for all 14 seasons.

== Premise ==
In each season, eight (Note: Season 14 only had seven contestants, while seasons 9 and 11 had nine.) drivers and their nominators are taken to the Driver Rehabilitation Centre, where they compete in challenges designed to improve their driving skills in an effort to not be named Canada's Worst Driver. In the first challenge, the contestants begin at a location about an hour's drive from the Driver Rehabilitation Centre; for the contestants' first challenge, they must head to the Driver Rehabilitation Centre, following the directions given to them. After arriving at the Driver Rehabilitation Centre, the driver's licenses of each contestant is confiscated. (Note: For the first two seasons, the contestants' car keys were confiscated instead.) The first episode concludes with an obstacle course challenge-- meant to evaluate the skills of the individual drivers-- in which contestants must routinely maneuver their cars through tight spaces with less than an inch of clearance on either side. To show that the challenge can be done without hitting obstacles by an average driver, host Andrew Younghusband performs each challenge before any contestant attempts the challenge. Beginning with the second episode, each contestant meets with the host and a panel of four experts for an evaluation of their performance. After all contestants are interviewed, the judges and host deliberate on which contestant–nominator pair have improved enough to graduate from the Driver Rehabilitation Centre. The driver who has graduated is eliminated from the competition and is sent home with their licenses returned to them; the contestants typically drive off with their nominators in the car that they used to arrive at the Driver Rehabilitation Centre. The experts also reserve the right to not graduate anyone for any episode or to graduate multiple contestants at the same time. The experts may also choose to expel any contestant who does not show any incentive to learn or who the experts believe should not continue driving; the licenses are returned. In this case, the contestant is eliminated from the competition, their licenses are returned, and they are given a ride home. The elimination process continues until only three contestants remain. (Note: The original intent was for only two drivers to remain in the first season, but due to an episode where no one graduated due to an overall poor performance in the Icy Corner Challenge, three remained for the final episode. Every season since has had three finalists, although Andrew twice suggested a four-person finale in season 7 and 10.) The three remaining contestants are then given the Mega Challenge, an obstacle course challenge with elements of every previous challenge, as well as a standard driver's examination through the streets of a major urban city near the Driver Rehabilitation Centre. Based on these final challenges, the experts determine which among the three is named Canada's Worst Driver. Unlike other versions of the Worst Driver series, where being eliminated early or being the Worst Driver is either rewarded with a new car or had their car destroyed, no prizes are given for being eliminated early or for being named Canada's Worst Driver, aside from a commemorative trophy.

=== Challenges ===
With the exception of the first and last episodes, challenges are specifically tailored to each contestant and designed by Andrew and the driving school sponsoring the series (whose head instructor is one of the experts; for the first three seasons, it was Young Drivers of Canada director of training Scott Marshall; in season four, it was Dan Bagyan of the Signature Driving School; in seasons five-seven, it was Peter Mellor of the Advanced Motoring Bureau and from the eighth season onward, it was Tim Danter of DriveWise). Challenges typically range from traditional driving school lessons such as parallel parking, reversing and driving with a trailer, to those not normally found in a beginner's driving course, such as driving a standard-transmission vehicle and performing extreme driving manoeuvres, such as the Scandinavian flick. However, some challenges are reused from year-to-year, like The Eye of the Needle and The Water Tank Challenge, which were both first introduced in the first season and are the only challenges to be featured in every season.

- The Shoulder Check Challenge is a challenge where contestants must drive in a straight line until they pass a sign on each side. The signs determine which of the two exits the contestants must take when the road forks ahead; however, the signs are posted in the reverse direction, so the contestants must briefly look behind them to read the signs. If neither exit is permitted (both signs are red), they are simply instructed to stop in front of the fork in the road. The lesson of this challenge is to only turn the head when performing a shoulder check, not the entire human body, as that will turn the car's wheels.
- Distracted Driving is a challenge introduced in the second season that was so unusually effective on one contestant (Matt Elkind) that it has been used in every subsequent season. In this challenge, drivers must drive around in a circle while having to do a series of tasks such as eating a sandwich, inserting a CD, texting and so on. Often, these tasks are tailored to each contestant's vices. The lesson is meant to teach individuals to not do these things while at the wheel, as it can cause potential accidents.
- Swerve and Avoid is a challenge where contestants must drive towards a wall at high speeds, only to turn away-- that is, swerve-- at the last moment to avoid hitting the wall. Typically, there are two exits to each side of the wall, which will either initially be blocked before one or both open at the last moment or initially be open before one or neither are blocked in the last moment. The lesson is to avoid touching the brake pedal, as putting the foot down on the brake will severely limit the car's steering ability and lead to crashing.
- The Cornering Challenge (called Driving into a Wall in the first two seasons) is a challenge where contestants must drive towards a wall of foam blocks at high speed before braking hard, releasing the brake and then turning away from the wall. The lesson in this challenge is to release the brake so as to not lose steering input to the car when it is needed. In some seasons, a large wet tarp may also be laid out on the ground in front of the wall, to simulate icy or slippery conditions.
- The Three-Point Turn Challenge (called The Dirty Circle in the second season) is a challenge where contestants must enter a small space and make a three-point turn, returning in the direction that they entered. The entrance may either be off to one side of the area (earlier seasons) or to the centre of the area (later seasons). A key lesson in this challenge is to make use of the space available to the car in order to do the turn efficiently; in some seasons, obstacles may ring the outer perimeter of the area to give the contestants a better visual cue.
- The Eye of the Needle is a perennial challenge where contestants must navigate through a series of archways at a minimum speed. The intended lesson is to have the driver look where they want to go, in the middle of the archways rather than at the feet on one side of the archway.
- The Figure-Eight Challenge (called Broken Hearts in the third season) is a perennial challenge introduced where drivers must reverse their car around a course in the shape of an 8. There are two versions of this challenge, the first of which originally featured in the second season, with a pair of contestants performing the challenge simultaneously: both cars begin in one end of the course and contestants must reverse their cars to where the other contestant began, with the only passing spaces available at the centre and opposite end of the course, while the second version, introduced in the fourth season, had each contestant do one lap in reverse with the remaining contestants as passengers.
- Canada's Worst Parking Lot is a version of musical chairs where drivers must find spaces to park. The parking lot is filled with cars and may have blocker cars that attempt to frustrate the contestants and cars that may open up new parking spaces. Any driving violation—such as parking in a no parking zone or hitting a stationary object—will typically send the contestant out of the parking lot in a lap penalty. The challenge ends when one contestant fails to park.
  - Canada's Worst Gas Station is a variation on the Canada's Worst Parking Lot Challenge featured in the second season and the eighth season with many of the same rules, but instead of just trying to find spaces to park, contestants also try to get fuel at a simulated self-service gasoline station, avoiding the diesel pump, which their car can't use. Hitting anything or performing a moving violation requires the contestant to leave the station and come back to try again. Most of the pumps start with blocker cars in front of them, which will leave as the challenge goes on. The challenge ends when one contestant fails to get fuel.
- The Water Tank Challenge is a perennial favorite in which the contestants must navigate around a tight obstacle course in a car with a roof-mounted water tank; should the contestants stop too abruptly, the contents of the tank will spill over into the cab of the vehicle, soaking its occupants. In earlier seasons, this was done with a pipe system, though in later seasons, open-top cars or cars with a sunroof are used. Portions of the obstacle course include a slow forward section, sudden stops due to last-minute reactions, such as a hidden stop sign or a pop-out car, a hump – infamous for repeatedly soaking Andrew in his demonstration runs – and optionally an acceleration portion. The intended lesson is on smooth threshold braking: should the contestants brake poorly or navigate too quickly, the water in the tank will spill, soaking both the contestant and nominator inside.
- The Handbrake Turn Challenge is a challenge introduced in the third season that has contestants perform a handbrake turn around a foam figure while in a confined space. The intent of this challenge is for contestants to learn the distribution of weight in a car, as well as a lesson on how to properly control a car in a skid.
- The Reverse Flick is a challenge that has contestants perform the namesake technique in a confined space; it is in essence the handbrake turn in reverse, and without the use of the handbrake. The intent of this challenge is similar to the handbrake turn challenge, but also introduces elements of driving in reverse at speed.
- Drifting Doughnuts (called Burning Out in the third season) is a challenge where contestants must drive in a wide doughnut around a figure; the key to this challenge is counter-steering partway through in order to allow the car to continue drifting, eventually towards a designated exit point. The lesson behind this challenge is on extreme manoeuvres as well as avoiding target fixation.
- The Trough is a challenge introduced in the fifth season where contestants must get their car to move across the namesake trough, a series of concrete Jersey barriers placed on their side, without the car leaving the rails and hitting the ground. The lesson behind this challenge is that the rear wheels will turn more sharply than the front wheels; the key to this challenge is to take wide turns and allow the car to hug the edges of the concrete rails.
- The Parallel Parking Challenge is a perennial challenge that requires drivers to parallel park. Often, there is a moving obstacle, such as an emergency vehicle in the third season, that the contestant must give way to.
- The Teeter-Totter (called The Balance-Beam for Unbalanced Drivers in the third season) is a challenge that has contestants balance a car atop a teeter-totter, such that both ends for the apparatus are off of the ground. The lesson of this challenge is on managing cars on slopes. The Gimbal is a variation of the teeter-totter challenge, where lateral motion is also introduced.
- The Slalom Challenge is a challenge where drivers "swerve" around blue and pink foam mannequins. In the seventh season, they were changed into red and blue hockey players, in keeping with that season's "Driving in Canada" theme. In the eighth season, they were changed into blue and pink shopping people, in keeping with that season's "Big city driving" theme.
- The Lane Change Challenge is a challenge where the drivers are on a two-lane course. The goal is to pass Andrew twice as he drives around. Key to this challenge is learning the proper technique for lane changes (check mirrors, signal, shoulder check, change lanes). Each infraction committed or improperly-executed lane change requires the guilty driver to pass Andrew one extra time. The challenge concludes when only one contestant is left on the course.

== Experts ==
Experts on Canada's Worst Driver
Season	Head driving instructor	High-speed driving instructor	Therapist	Legal expert	Other
1	Scott Marshall	Kelly Williams	Uzma Rehman	—N/a	Jim Kenzie (Note: Credited as an automobile journalist and driving instructor)
2	Scott Marshall	Juliana Chiovitti	—N/a	Cam Woolley	Markus Agyeman (Note: Credited as an insurance broker)
3	Scott Marshall	Philippe Létourneau	Louisa Gembora	Cam Woolley	—N/a
4	Dan Bagyan	Philippe Létourneau	Louisa Gembora	Cam Woolley	—N/a
5	Peter Mellor	Philippe Létourneau	Louisa Gembora	Cam Woolley	—N/a
6	Peter Mellor	Philippe Létourneau	Lauren Kennedy-Smith	Cam Woolley	—N/a
7	Peter Mellor	Philippe Létourneau	Shyamala Kiru	Cam Woolley	—N/a
8	Tim Danter	Philippe Létourneau	Shyamala Kiru	Cam Woolley	—N/a
9	Tim Danter	Philippe Létourneau	Shyamala Kiru	Cam Woolley	—N/a
10	Tim Danter	Philippe Létourneau	Shyamala Kiru	Cam Woolley	—N/a
11	Tim Danter	Philippe Létourneau	Shyamala Kiru	Cam Woolley	—N/a
12	Tim Danter	Philippe Létourneau	Shyamala Kiru	Cam Woolley	—N/a
13	Tim Danter	Philippe Létourneau	Shyamala Kiru	Cam Woolley	—N/a
14	Tim Danter	Philippe Létourneau	Shyamala Kiru	Cam Woolley	—N/a

== Season synopses ==
Season	Originally aired		Worst Driver(s)	Runner(s)-up
Season	First Aired	Last Aired	Worst Driver(s)	Runner(s)-up
1	October 3, 2005	November 21, 2005	Chris Ferguson	Madalena Phillips
2	October 16, 2006	December 4, 2006	Henrietta Gallant	Michael Telford
3	October 29, 2007	December 17, 2007	Jason Zhang	Shelby D'Souza
4	October 27, 2008	December 15, 2008	Ashley van Ham	Emily Wang
5	October 26, 2009	December 14, 2009	Angelina Marcantognini	Michael "Mike" Butt
6	October 25, 2010	December 13, 2010	Lance Morin	Dale Pitton
7	October 24, 2011	December 13, 2011	Shirley Sampson	Sly Grosjean
8	October 29, 2012	December 17, 2012	Flora Wang and Kevin Simmons (Note: Both were declared Canada's Worst Driver)	N/A (Note: Both Wang and Simmons were named Canada's Worst Driver, hence the lack of a runner up)
9	October 28, 2013	December 16, 2013	Kevin Simmons	Dale Pitton
10	October 27, 2014	December 15, 2014	Chanie Richard	Siham Martell
11	October 26, 2015	December 14, 2015	Jillian Matthews	Polly Sargeant
12	October 24, 2016	December 12, 2016	Krystal McCann	Daniella Florica
13	October 23, 2017	December 11, 2017	Mélanie Lautard	Ashley Dunne
14	October 29, 2018	December 17, 2018	Brandon Wilkins	Alexis Pratola

=== Season 1 (2005) ===
Season 1's theme was "winter driving." (This was the only season filmed in the winter; all subsequent seasons were filmed during the summer.) The first season's worst driver was Chris Ferguson due to his inexperience and lack of awareness on the road.

=== Season 2 (2006) ===
Season 2's theme was "summer driving" as the previous season had been filmed in the winter. This season's worst driver was Henrietta Gallant due to her vision issues, her refusal to wear glasses and to admit responsibility for her faults, along with being unable to complete the final road test. This season saw the first expulsion in any Worst Driver series, when Colin Sheppard was expelled due to his unwillingness to learn. This season also saw the first instance of two contestants graduating in the same episode, as Sean McConnell and Jodi Slobodesky graduated in the penultimate episode.

=== Season 3 (2007) ===
Season 3's theme was "extreme driving manoeuvres." This season's worst driver was Jason Zhang due to his dangerous final road test performance-- stopping in the middle of merging onto Ontario Highway 400. As a result, Jason immediately surrendered his license and gave up driving permanently, the first contestant ever to do so, which made runner-up Shelby D'Souza technically the worst by default. This season saw the first instance of a contestant graduating in the fifth episode, Billie-Jean Leslie.

=== Season 4 (2008) ===
Season 4's theme was "legal consequences of bad driving." This season's worst driver was Ashley van Ham who, despite passing most of the challenges and being shortlisted four times, including three episodes in a row, was named Canada's Worst Driver for her emotional instability at the wheel and not addressing frustrations with her husband and nominator, Bryan. This made her the youngest driver at the time until Brandon Wilkins received the title in season 14. This season saw the first-ever medical expulsion in any Worst Driver series due to the experts' belief that Donna Hicks should no longer be driving; Donna was eliminated in this manner in part due to angina. This season also saw the only instance of an all-female finale in the series' history.

=== Season 5 (2009) ===
Season 5's theme was "driver's boot camp." This season's worst driver was Angelina Marcantognini due to her severe anxiety and lack of focus. (Andrew further stated during the Canada's Worst Driver: U Asked! special his belief that Angelina is the worst of the "worst drivers" to date, though he subsequently retracted this statement in Canada's Worst Driver Ever, saying that her severe emotional problems were more of concern for her driving than a lack of technical ability.) This season saw the first time a contestant left due to a personal tragedy, after Crystal Hubley Farao's brother-in-law was fatally injured in a traffic collision when another driver failed to yield the right-of-way. This season was also the first to feature the three finalists driving a convertible on each of their final road tests during the final episode of every subsequent season.

=== Season 6 (2010) ===
Season 6's theme was "high-performance driving." This season's worst driver was Lance Morin due to being inexperienced and denying that his anxiety had anything to do with his driving. Lance was also unable to complete the final road test, as he had an anxiety attack after the first turn. This season featured the first-ever instance of a driver effectively being removed by their nominator after Scott Schurink's poor attitude caused his nominator, Danny Bridgman, to cancel their shared insurance policy (resulting in Scott's immediate expulsion, as he was unable to insure himself due to his insurance being too expensive).

=== Season 7 (2011) ===
Season 7's theme was "the peculiarities of driving in Canada." This season's worst driver was Shirley Sampson, who, despite performing well in most of the challenges this season, was named Canada's Worst Driver after a disastrous final road test that included stopping while merging onto (and attempting to exit) the Chedoke Expressway. This season was the first to be broadcast in HD, owing to the launch of the high-definition simulcast of Discovery Channel.

=== Season 8 (2012) ===
Season 8's theme was "big city driving." This season's worst drivers were Flora Wang and Kevin Simmons. Both Flora and Kevin were named Canada's Worst Driver for being equally bad in different ways, with Flora's poor progress and Kevin's unwillingness to accommodate for his non-functioning right eye, respectively, being their main issues. This was the only time that there was a tie for Canada's Worst Driver.

=== Season 9 (2013) ===
Season 9 was an "all-star" season, which saw nine previous winners and runners-up return to the show for a chance to either redeem themselves or be named the worst-ever. This season's worst driver was Kevin Simmons due to turning in an even worse final road test than the previous season. Afterwards, he burned his license under the promise he'd made to the panel and his boyfriend and nominator, Lenny Stone, that he'd stop driving if he either didn't graduate or was named the worst ever. This season saw the first of each of the following five instances: 1. The first time a contestant graduated in the first episode (as Chris Ferguson was the only returning driver to pass the assessment challenge). 2. The first time a contestant was disqualified and removed from the show due to the experts judging them ineligible to take part. (Henrietta Gallant admitted she largely gave up driving after previously being named the worst.) 3. The first time another contestant's nominator was replaced. (Yolanda Kozak served as Michael Telford's nominator after his original nominator, Eric, was unable to return for health reasons; he had since recovered to replace her in the fifth episode after she was proven to be too negative.) 4. This season saw Angelina Marcantognini being sent away to a 60-day stay at a specialist psychiatric clinic after having a severe bout of anxiety attack caused on by stress. 5. This season featured the only instance of an all-male finale in the series' history (until Dale returned for the trophy ceremony).

=== Season 10 (2014) ===
Season 10's theme was "10th Anniversary." This season's worst driver was self-described "Selfie Queen" Chanie Richard due to her lack of focus at the wheel and for admitting to driving without her legally-required medication.

=== Season 11 (2015) ===
Season 11's theme was "high-speed driving." This season's worst driver was Jillian Matthews, who, despite passing some challenges and numerous practice driving sessions in public off-camera, was named Canada's Worst Driver due to her inability to completely overcome her anxiety when alone behind the wheel, deemed by the judges to be a real danger to other drivers on the road. This season featured nine contestants instead of the usual eight, as for the first time ever, a pair of contestants-- brothers Sholom and Shmuel Hoffman-- had both nominated one another and were considered equally bad drivers. This season also saw the second instance of two contestants graduating in an episode, as Alexander Morrison and Tina Cook did so in the second episode.

=== Season 12 (2016) ===
Season 12's theme was "dangers of speeding." This season's worst driver was Krystal McCann due to her cell phone usage, aggressive driving, mood swings, hostile attitude toward Andrew and not taking the lessons to heart. (Krystal later attributed her behaviour to borderline personality disorder, which she was diagnosed with after the show.) This season featured the show's 100th episode, being the seventh episode of the season. This season also saw the only occurrence in which the traditional trophy was not awarded to Canada's Worst Driver as it was instead repurposed as the Final Graduate trophy and awarded to Tyler Dupont (the experts believed Krystal was not even worthy of it due to her hostile behavior in rehab).

=== Season 13 (2017) ===
Season 13's theme was "driving fears" and "the number 13." This season's worst driver was Mélanie Lautard-- the last woman to be named as such-- due to her inability to focus on, apply and sometimes remember the lessons she was taught in rehab and her negative attitude towards herself and the Rehabilitation Centre's instructors while driving on- and off-camera. This season saw the only instance of a former contestant returning as the nominator of a new contestant, as Canada's Worst Driver 11 "winner" Jillian Kieley (née Matthews) served as Ashley Dunne's nominator. This season also made more extensive use of helicopter drone aerial video than previous seasons.

=== Season 14 (2018) ===
Season 14's theme was "evolution of driving." This season's worst driver was Brandon Wilkins, the final person ever given the title of Canada's Worst Driver (replacing season 4 "winner" Ashley van Ham as the youngest) due to his reckless driving, emotional instability and lack of basic understanding of road signs and rules. As a result, Brandon immediately cut up his license after promising he would quit driving if named the worst. This was the only season to feature seven contestants instead of the usual eight. This season also marked the only instance of a new contestant graduating in the first episode, as Ryan Whittier drove perfectly in the Assessment Challenge, while Brandon had to get a doctor's note after arriving at rehab to get permission to be able to drive since he broke his arm in a skateboarding accident a week before filming.

== Production ==
=== Nomination ===
Like its sister series, the contestants were chosen by nominations submitted to Proper Television. Until June 2011, when Canada's Worst Handyman was cancelled and later replaced in April 2015 with Blood, Sweat & Tools (which was itself cancelled after nine episodes), Canada's Worst Driver and Canada's Worst Handyman were filmed alternately, with each season of Canada's Worst Driver followed by a season of Canada's Worst Handyman (except for the first season, in which Canada's Worst Handyman was filmed during the summer and Canada's Worst Driver was filmed during the winter, Canada's Worst Driver has been filmed during the summer and Canada's Worst Handyman was filmed during the winter). Nominations for the next season of one were accepted shortly after the airing of another on Discovery Channel. Also, like its sister series, candidates may be nominated by multiple nominators, though only one nominator accompanies the contestant to the Driver Rehabilitation Centre.

=== Locations ===
The location of the Driver Rehabilitation Centre and of the final road test have changed throughout the show's run. In the first season, the Centre was located on the grounds of CFB Picton (currently operating as Picton Airport), a decommissioned military base near Picton, Ontario that closed in 1969, while the road test took place in Old Montreal.

In season 2, the Centre moved to the grounds of CFB Borden while the road test took place in Toronto.

In season 3, the Centre moved again, this time to the grounds of the now-demolished Edgar Adult Occupation Centre, an institution for developmentally disabled or handicapped adults in Oro-Medonte that formerly housed a radar station that was sold in 1964, with the entire institution closing in 1999 while the road test took place in Barrie.

In season 4, the Centre moved again, this time to the grounds of the Ontario Reformatory Prison, an abandoned correctional facility in Guelph that closed down in 2002 due to being too harsh, while the road test took place in Toronto.

In season 5, the series returned to CFB Borden (referred to on-air by Andrew as "an undisclosed military location") while the road test took place in Toronto.

In season 6, the Centre moved yet again, this time to its permanent location-- the grounds of the Dunnville Airport, a registered aerodrome near Dunnville that ceased airport operations in 2013, while the road test took place in Niagara Falls, then moved to Hamilton from the seventh season onward.

== Release ==
The first seven seasons are currently available for download in Canada from the iTunes Store in widescreen standard definition (480p). Seasons 8-14 are available from iTunes in both standard and high definition (720p/1080p). The final two seasons are available for streaming on CraveTV. Each season has also been posted on DiscoveryChannel.ca and YouTube for streaming. There has been no news on whether the series will be released on DVD/Blu-ray.

== See also ==
- World's Worst Driver
- Don't Drive Here
