= Canada's Worst Driver season 1 =

Canada's Worst Driver
- Season 1
- No. of episodes: 8

Release
- Original network: Discovery Channel
- Original release: October 3 – November 21, 2005

Season chronology
- Next → Canada's Worst Driver 2

Canada's Worst Driver 1 is the first season of the Canadian reality TV show Canada's Worst Driver, which aired on the Discovery Channel, based on the UK five's version Britain's Worst Driver. As with subsequent years, eight people, nominated by their family or friends, enter the 25-day Driver Rehabilitation Centre to improve their driving skills. This year, the Driver Rehabilitation Centre is located at CFB Picton, a decommissioned military base near Picton, Ontario that closed down in 1969, with the final road test taking place in Montreal, Quebec.

The first season was aired as an eight-part series. The show's weekly time slot captured 65% more viewers for the Discovery Channel compared to the prior year.

== Experts ==
- Dr. Uzma Rehman was a behavioural psychologist and a faculty member at Queen's University.
- Jim Kenzie is a syndicated automotive journalist and president of the Automotive Journalists Association of Canada who also reviews vehicles for the Toronto Star. Since 1988, he also has an editorial-like segment on TSN's "Motoring" program, now in its 20th season. He wrote the textbook for advanced driver training used by the Toronto Police Service and other advanced training classes and is widely recognized as a vehicle expert.
- Scott Marshall was the Director of Training for Young Drivers of Canada, whose job was to train the instructors who train drivers.
- Kelly Williams was a Canadian CASCAR driver and the only female to win a race in that series. She has also been the spokesperson for "Be Car Care Aware," an auto safety organization.

== Contestants ==
- Madalena Phillips, 21 and licensed for five years, from Toronto, Ontario, had been in well over 30 accidents as well as innumerable incidents she called "bumps" when there were no witnesses. Despite this, her parents still paid for her car insurance, over $9,000 per year. Her irresponsible driving was largely due to a complete lack of concern about anything except shopping, partying and fashion. She was by and large an incompetent driver by choice and considered it part of her lifestyle. Madalena was nominated by her best friend, Jennifer. She drives a black Pontiac Sunfire GT.
- Robert "Bob" Coad, 36 and licensed for 20 years, from Guelph, Ontario, was an otherwise excellent driver, except for a tendency towards road rage and a little freeway game he called "bumper tag" that involved passing cars that he was annoyed at and suddenly slamming on his brakes in front of them (a.k.a. "brake checking"), forcing them to panic brake to avoid a rear-end collision. Bob was nominated by his buddy, Rob. He drives a red Chevrolet Lumina.
- Christopher "Chris" Ferguson, 31 and licensed for 13 years, from Malton, Ontario (near Mississauga), was totally inexperienced behind the wheel, having driven only four times since getting his license in 1992. He was insecure and very slow while driving, creating a hazard on the road. Chris was nominated by his wife of three years, Michelle Ferguson. He drives a black Mitsubishi Lancer and drove a grey Chevrolet Cobalt to the rehab centre.
- David Chau, 24 and licensed for five years, from Toronto, Ontario, attributed his driving problems to being "unlucky" and refused to take responsibility for his incompetence on the road. His driving errors during the program often completely destroyed the cars used for the show. He would listen to—and then blame—his passengers for bad driving advice, even though he's the one driving. David was nominated by his buddy, George. He drives a red Chrysler Intrepid and drove a Mitsubishi Lancer to the rehab centre.
- Faith-Ann Stone, 30 and licensed for 14 years, from Niagara Falls, Ontario, had been in 37 reported accidents since getting her license in 1991, including hitting a woman she didn't even know on two separate occasions. She was reckless and drove far too fast, in spite of having been laid-up for six months by a collision two years earlier. Her issues largely arose from lack of proper driving instruction and her cavalier attitude towards driving. She was independently nominated by four different people, but it was her co-worker, Joanne, who represented the three other people who nominated Faith-Ann. She drives a silver 2005 Jeep Liberty.
- Heather Reynolds, 59 and licensed for 30 years, from Medicine Hat, Alberta, was a nurse who had written off ten cars in 20 years. During the series, it was discovered that due to having 20/100 vision, meaning she could only see 20% as good as other people, most of her troubles were caused by not having a proper prescription for her glasses. Like Chris, she was not reckless, but dangerously slow due to lack of confidence in her driving. Heather was nominated by her husband of 22 years, Ernie, a former truck driver. She drives a beige Chevrolet Venture and drove a blue Chevrolet Epica to the rehab centre. On September 3, 2023, Heather died of natural causes.
- Manuel Tejeda, 36 and licensed for six years, from Calgary, Alberta, is a computer genius who can speak six different languages, but had difficulties with over-thinking everything he did while driving until it was too late. He also had a problem with his temper, causing him to lose control when he failed during driving lessons. Manuel was nominated by his co-worker of three and a half years, Alex. He drives a silver Nissan Altima and drove a red Chevrolet Impala to the rehab centre.
- Tatiana Rheaume, 42 and licensed for 22 years, from Ajax, Ontario, is an immigrant from Bulgaria who was a competent driver until a serious car accident turned her into a paranoid wreck behind the wheel when she drove hazardously slow on freeways and refused to make left turns, subsequently resulting in her car accident, often dangerously bunching up traffic and driving in the wrong lane. Tatiana was nominated by her mother-in-law, Beth. She drives a black Mazda Protege and drove a red Chevrolet Cavalier to the rehab centre.

== Synopsis ==
Contestant	1	2	3	4	5	6	7	8
Chris Ferguson	IN	IN	IN	IN	IN	IN	IN	CWD
Madalena Phillips	IN	IN	IN	IN	IN	IN	IN	RUNNER-UP
Heather Reynolds	IN	IN	IN	IN	IN	IN	IN	OUT
Manuel Tejeda	IN	IN	IN	IN	IN	IN	OUT	
David Chau	IN	IN	IN	IN	IN	OUT		
Faith-Ann Stone	IN	IN	IN	OUT				
Tatiana Rheaume	IN	IN	OUT					
Bob Coad	IN	OUT						

The contestant became Canada's Worst Driver.
The contestant was runner-up for Canada's Worst Driver.
The contestant was on the panel's shortlist.
The contestant graduated.

== Episodes ==
No.	Title	Original release date
1	TBA	October 3, 2005
The Drive to Rehab: In the season premiere, the eight candidates and the four experts are introduced. As in subsequent seasons of the show, each bad driver must drive themselves and their nominators to the Driver Rehabilitation Centre.; First to Arrive: David was the first to leave and the first to arrive.; Last to Arrive: Madalena was the last.; Slowest to Arrive: Madalena was also the slowest to arrive. During her drive, she tried to do a U-turn, but went off-course into a ditch, asking others to put her car back on the road. Eventually, she also crashed into a rock, causing damage to the front bumper of her car. She arrived at three hours.; Fastest to Arrive: Bob was the last to leave, but the second to arrive.; Skills Evaluation/Driving into a Wall: After each of the drivers is given a one-hour lesson in stopping before hitting by Young Drivers of Canada instructor Heather Jones, they are given the task of accelerating towards a wall of boxes, then braking, with the objective being not to hit them, while driving a green Mercury Grand Marquis. The drivers had two attempts at this; in the first, Scott put up a traffic control light to warn the drivers when to brake. The second tested whether the drivers would stop before hitting the wall with the light not turned on. Most of the drivers ran into the wall in their second attempt.; Best Performer: Chris and Heather were the only two people who passed this challenge, but Chris doing slightly better.; Worst Performer: David did the worst, going through the wall and did not stop from the wall in a very long distance and killed the vehicle.; When speaking with the experts, Jim lambasts Madalena's reckless attitude while driving, Manuel's overthinking behaviour is brought up by Scott, and Kelly brings up Tatiana's fearfulness while driving on the highway. Also, Uzma calls out David's lack of responsibility behind the wheel, the experts wonder if Chris' wife is more of the reason he's a bad driver due to her negativity, Heather's lack of awareness is brought up and both Bob and Faith-Ann are called out for their dangerous driving habits, especially the latter as despite having 37 accidents and metal plates surgically implanted, she continues to drive the same. At the end of the episode, Andrew announces that beginning next episode, someone will graduate from rehab.
2	TBA	October 10, 2005
Water Tank Challenge: The drivers are taught gentle braking in this challenge, where water is placed in a tank over a car. The objective of the challenge is to maneuver the Honda Accord around an obstacle course (complete with several surprises), with jerky braking causing the water to overflow from the tank, soaking the occupants in the car.; Fastest Performer: Bob performed the fastest at 5:01.; Slowest Performer: Madalena performed the slowest at 12:20.; Parallel Parking: After each of the drivers is given a lesson in parallel parking by Heather, they are given the task of parallel parking a 6 m (20 ft) long Volvo station wagon behind one of two cars on an icy hill, which has horns and lights hooked up to both the car and the curb to alert the drivers if they hit anything. Andrew is seated in the fire truck and is kept in communication with the Volvo. Faith-Ann is the first to take the challenge, hitting four times. Manuel, who spent 12 minutes just getting his mirrors set correctly by Alex, hits five times. Tatiana is next and, despite being terrified, has the fastest time so far, hitting only once. Heather is next to take the challenge and proves to be the worst, hitting 17 times. Bob is next and, despite hitting twice, keeps his road rage in check (Chris' performance was not shown).; Fastest Performer: Tatiana performed the fastest at 1:59.; Slowest Performer: Heather performed the slowest at 14:48.; Road Signs: Scott gives a simple quiz on their knowledge of road signs. Bob answers all five signs correctly, while Heather is worse with only one.; Nighttime Driving Skills: With all the challenges completed for the day, it was time for Andrew and the experts to decide who should graduate. Scott remarks that Manuel needs to put his intelligence to better use, feels that Madelena is treating rehab like a game and notes that, despite her nerves, Tatiana is not the worst they have. Chris' lack of experience is brought up, and the experts believe that Bob has finally realized that his attitude was the major problem. As for Andrew, he gives David a mantra to repeat throughout his time in rehab ("If I hear metal scraping on metal, I will stop my car"), while challenging Faith Ann on really caring about rehab despite her dismissal of it. In the end, Bob is named the first graduate as, despite his poor performance on the Water Tank Challenge, his change in attitude after the Parallel Parking Challenge and during the Nighttime Driving Skills Challenge proved he could drive properly when he is not road raging.
3	TBA	October 17, 2005
Farmyard Challenge: The drivers are given the task of reversing a Chevrolet Corsica through a hallway of hay, a slalom of obstacles and between two parked cars, then forward to a dirt road where a tractor will appear from out of nowhere, forcing the drivers to reverse again toward a stampede of sheep until there's enough room to swerve out of the way of the tractor without running over the sheep. Chris is the first to take the challenge, finishing with the fastest time of the day, followed by Manuel (whose priority is the sheep), Tatiana (the only driver to collide with the tractor), Madalena, Heather (who had to complete the challenge with Alex because Ernie couldn't handle riding with Heather) and David (who relinquished control of the wheel to George, took the longest time to finish and spun off the road twice), finishing with the slowest time (Faith-Ann's performance was not shown).; Fastest Performer: Chris performed the fastest at 6:04.; Slowest Performer: David performed the slowest at 37:00.; Best Performer: Chris and Tatiana were the only two people who completed this challenge in less than ten minutes, but Chris doing slightly better.; Worst Performer: David did the worst, continuously bulldozing his way through and spinning off the road twice to the point he got stuck on ice for over half an hour without asking for help to the point he states he would walk in a normal situation, something the panel doesn't find funny at all.; Three-Point Turn: After each of the drivers is given a lesson in making a three-point turn by Scott, they are given the task of driving a Mercury Topaz onto a platform, turn the car around in no more than three steps and drive back off. To guide them, three buckets of water are displayed at each edge. Chris takes two attempts, but he does finish with a three-point turn in 0:59. Madalena's best effort is a 13-point turn in 1:24. Heather, who has Andrew ride shotgun in place of Ernie this time, finishes with her best effort, a seven-point turn in 3:00. Manuel takes so many repeated attempts to improve on a five-point turn, he has to take a pit stop, but he does finish with a three-point turn in 0:48 (Tatiana's, David's and Faith-Ann's runs were not shown).; The Eye of the Needle: In this challenge, the drivers have to drive a Pontiac Firebird between a series of cones and boxes. Each driver will get to drive at increased speeds, first to a sluggish 40 km/h, then 50 km/h and finally 60 km/h. To make sure they reach the minimum speed, Const. Lon Fuller of the Ontario Provincial Police will clock each driver to make sure they reach the minimum speed. Manuel is the first to take the challenge and not only hits columns of boxes and takes out a bridge of boxes at the end, but also fails to even reach 40 km/h, only managing to reach a pitiful 32 km/h (his subsequent attempts to drive at increased speeds are shown, but not clocked). Faith-Ann is next and, like Manuel before her, hits columns of boxes while driving 40 km/h and sideswipes three columns in a row while driving 50 km/h and hits another column of boxes at 60 km/h. David is next (his first two attempts to drive at increased speeds are not shown, but his attempt to drive 60 km/h results in him jerking the steering wheel back and forth), followed by Heather (who, like Manuel, not only hits columns of boxes, but also fails to even reach 40 km/h, only managing to reach a pitiful speed of just under 20 km/h, but her steering gets worse when she reaches 50 km/h and, like Manuel, also takes out a bridge of boxes at the end after speeding up to 60 km/h, leading Andrew to point out that the passenger side is where the car usually gets hit during the challenge, claiming that the drivers are not just dangerous, but selfish as well, as they only care about their own safety rather than that of their passengers), Chris (the only driver to reach 40 km/h without hitting anything, yet still knocks down a couple of boxes at 50 km/h and really obliterates the bridge of boxes at the end when he decides to speed up to 70 km/h) and Tatiana (who is still too nervous to even drive at 40 km/h, yet her breakthrough occurs by the time she begins her final run, in which she speeds up to 72 km/h).; Despite colliding with the tractor in the Farmyard Challenge, Tatiana's renewed confidence following the Eye of the Needle makes her the second graduate.
4	TBA	October 24, 2005
All-Reversing Challenge: The drivers were asked to reverse through a winding hallway of obstacles in a full-size pickup truck, using their mirrors along the way. To make things even more stressful, Andrew will act as a road rager and blocker.; Fastest Performer: Manuel performed the fastest at 16:45.; Slowest Performer: Heather performed the slowest at 47:29.; Blindfold Driving: The nominators will be required to drive the Grand Marquis blindfolded while the drivers will act as navigators. The nominators will be blindfolded with bandannas in this challenge.; Fastest Performer: Manuel performed the fastest at 16:51.; Slowest Performer: Chris performed the slowest at 24:33.; Changing a Tire: The drivers were given six minutes to change a tire.; Fastest Performer: Manuel performed the fastest at 9:34.; Slowest Performer: Madalena performed the slowest at 25:02.; Stick-Shift Driving: In this simple driving challenge, after being given a lesson on stick-shift driving by Scott, the contestants must take a standard transmission Honda Accord and drive it up a straightaway (peppered with stops), perform a three-point turn and back down the same straightaway.; Fastest Performer: Manuel performed the fastest at 1:45.; Slowest Performer: Chris performed the slowest at 5:45.; Despite Manuel finishing the fastest in each challenge this episode, including a flawless run in the Stick-Shift Driving Challenge, Faith-Ann's confidence convinces the experts that she should be the third graduate, ensuring that there will not be three women in the finale.
5	TBA	October 31, 2005
Trailer Towing: In this challenge, Scott gives each of the drivers a lesson in reversing with a small trailer in an empty parking lot before the drivers are instructed to take a wide turn going forward, straighten, then reverse a Pontiac Firebird towing a snowmobile on a trailer down an icy boat ramp, keeping the trailer from jackknifing along the way. Manuel is first to attempt this challenge and gets through the forward section with no difficulty, but it's reversing that is the most pressure, especially for Adam, as success is paramount: he wants Manuel to have a flawless episode so he can graduate and go home. Despite jackknifing early while reversing, Manuel keeps his composure, repositions and completes with little difficulty. David is next to attempt this challenge and his biggest issue is more his buddy George, who he constantly listens to all the time, than the challenge itself, as with George's constant advice, he gets stuck just going forward. As if that's not enough, George is back to his old grabby ways when he tries to turn the steering wheel, forcing Scott to assist David on the challenge, but even with Scott's help, David still jackknifes, but eventually completes the challenge. Chris is next to attempt this challenge and, like Manuel, has no difficulty going forward, but, like David, has some trouble reversing, but after nearly 25 minutes, completes the challenge with what Andrew calls "the cleanest backing of the day." Heather, whose ineptitude in the last episode frustrated Ernie so much during the reversing challenge, he had to take a timeout, also has a little difficulty reversing, but completes the challenge. Madalena not only jackknifes, but she takes the longest time to reverse the trailer. As if that's not embarrassing enough, she nearly gets run over when the car is thrown in neutral and tries to steer it while running alongside it. However, after 47 minutes and assistance from both Scott and Andrew, Madalena finally completes the challenge.; Canada's Worst Parking Lot: In this challenge, the five contestants are given five cars and must park in whatever parking stalls are available. However, any moving violation (including hitting other cars, parking so that the car is not between the lines or parking in no-parking zones) will result in the contestant penalized by being forced to drive out of the parking lot and take a penalty lap. After a rather chaotic start, in which Madalena orders Jennifer out of the Mercury Topaz to deliberately stand in one of the two open parking spaces available, leading to Michelle to get out of the Volvo 240 station wagon, walk over to Jennifer and nearly body-slam her to get her to move out of there, Chris becomes the first driver to get parked. Manuel, driving a Honda Accord, becomes the second driver to get parked up. Shortly thereafter, Madalena orders Jennifer out of the car a second time to stand in another open space. With David taking a lap around the parking lot to wait for a potential parking space to open up, Madalena and Heather both deny each other access to a potential parking space, so Andrew forces Madalena to take a lap around the parking lot, which results in Madalena passing David in the Chevrolet Corsica to loop back around and become the third driver to get parked. David finally manages to reverse into a parking space, leaving Heather, driving the Mercury Grand Marquis, out of luck; adding insult to injury, neither David nor Madalena give up their parking space, although Madalena was contemplating it. Manuel, who was the first driver to park, takes the initiative and gives up his spot for Heather.; Firebird Challenge: Icy Corner: In a surprising twist, the experts decide that, despite being the only one to take initiative in the Canada's Worst Parking Lot Challenge, Manuel's disastrous performance in the Icy Corner Challenge ends up being the deal-breaker, as no one graduates this episode.
6	TBA	November 7, 2005
High Speed Reversing Challenge: Drivers are given the task of driving a Ford Econoline moving truck between lane markers and parked cars both forwards and in reverse within 20 minutes while remembering to use their mirrors, in a test of their ability to tell where their corners are. Even Andrew ends up hitting once while going forward, but that was due to speeding to beat the clock. Manuel is the first to take the challenge (the only one to finish within the time limit, with 36 seconds to spare), with Chris, Madalena and David all failing to finish in time (although David finally learned the mantra "no metal on metal") and Heather (who, despite being allowed extra time, continues causing damage; her time is not shown).; Best Performer: Manuel was the only one who completed this challenge within the time limit.; Worst Performer: Heather did the worst, even though Chris, Madalena and David didn't finish in time.; Fastest Performer: Manuel performed the fastest at 19:24.; Slowest Performer: Heather performed the slowest at 39:25.; Navigating around Picton: Drivers are given eight minutes to navigate a course involving 10 turns through Picton in a Dodge Caravan, with the beginning at the Driver Rehabilitation Centre and the ending at the Crystal Palace on the grounds of Picton Fairgrounds. Heather takes nearly a half hour of driving, mainly due to her 20/100 vision. David finishes without any issues, while Chris needs help just remembering the directions, having to stop at least twice to get directions from Andrew, while Manuel only has to stop once but, despite getting lost, eventually arrives. Madalena continues to be obliviously careless, going 80 km/h in a 60 km/h zone and 75 km/h in a 50 km/h zone, both of which Andrew reprimands Madalena of upon arriving.; Remote Control Car Exercise: Based on a suggestion George made in Episode 3, the show sets up a small exercise on teaching the nominees about where their car is by having them drive a remote control car in a figure eight course. While most of them struggle in this exercise, David gets the hang of it quickly and does the best of the five.; Tempo Challenge: Winter Car Care Challenge: Going to the Store to Buy Milk in February: To test the nominees on their common sense of driving in the winter, the show sets up a course where they have the simple task of getting milk, but in the worst of the winter season. The nominees must clean their car that is buried in snow and call for Andrew to jump start the car battery with his truck. And even then, the route to the fridge is littered with snow banks, which they can choose to shovel out of or drive through. Chris is first up and manages to clean the car thoroughly, even though he needs Andrew and Michelle's help on how to charge the battery and get the car moving, but he loses points for driving recklessly through the snow banks despite Michelle having a chronic neck problem. Heather is slow on realizing that she needs Andrew's help to charge her battery and gets stuck due to not shoveling the wheels out, and like Chris, she drives through the snow banks to get the milk. Still, Heather finishes the fastest out the nominees. Manuel clears the snow off the car and around it thoroughly, having Alex test the car as he does so, but they make the risky decision of having Andrew push the car out. As with the previous two, Manuel drives through the snow banks, and speeds back to the start, greatly disappointing the experts as he ruined what would have been a good performance. For David, he has George shovel the snow banks as he cleans the snow off the car and charge the battery. Once David gets power, he performs the first clean run of the challenge. Finally, Madalena needs Jennifer to help her connect the booster cables, and recklessly speeds through the snow banks, proving that her claim of taking things slowly was a lie.; In stark contrast to the previous episode, the experts are willing to graduate and send someone home, with the exception of Manuel and Madalena. In the end, the experts agree that, although he still has a ways to go, David is not Canada's Worst Driver as he proved in this episode that he can take responsibility behind the wheel and his perfect drive in Picton and the Winter Car Care Challenge shows how much he improved in rehab. Before Andrew gives David his keys back, he has the latter say his mantra one last time, "If I hear metal scraping on metal, I will stop." Once David recites it word for word, he gets his keys back and becomes the fourth graduate.
7	TBA	November 14, 2005
Corsica Challenge: Swerve and Avoid: The drivers practice swerving in three varying components in the Chevrolet Corsica: drive 60 km/h at a bull moose, quickly braking 14 m (46 ft) before the moose, reducing their speed to 30 km/h and swerving around the moose, then drive 30 km/h at a second moose, swerving 5 m (16 ft) before the moose without braking and then drive 40 km/h toward a barrier of empty water jugs. Manuel passes with flying colors, while Heather and Madalena need at least two attempts to pass. Chris fares the worst, overbraking at the first moose and being the only contestant to hit the wall. As if that wasn't bad enough, Chris reveals that he may have peed on himself from all the surging adrenaline.; Scavenger Hunt: In this nighttime navigational challenge, the contestants become the navigators while the nominators drive the car. They are given 23 minutes to navigate a 30 km (19 mi) course, first heading to Regent Cafe in Picton to count the tiers on a cake in the bakery window, then head to Rudy's Grocery General Store in Cherry Valley, Ontario to find out if the door opens by pushing or pulling, then head to the North Marysburg Landfill Site in Milford, Ontario to learn the cost of a bulk minimum deposit before finishing the challenge at Waring House Restaurant and Inn. Before the challenge begins, Andrew informs everyone that since Ernie is ill, Andrew will drive Heather. After a staggered start, Manuel is first to arrive at all four locations, while neither Madalena nor Chris reach the general store or the dump, but Madalena and Chris—who is too preoccupied with her cell phone and pretty much pessimistic the entire drive, respectively—arrive ahead of Heather, who took nearly four hours and 146 km (91 mi) of being driven by Andrew to finally complete the challenge due to Heather's inability to read a map in the dark.; All-Reversing Challenge Redux: Due to the shockingly bad performance in the All-Reversing Challenge back in Episode 4, the drivers were asked to reverse through a winding hallway of obstacles in a full-size pickup truck with a full load in the back to impede their view during their second run.; Aided by a flawless effort in a challenge that was specifically tightened so as to try to make him lose his temper, Manuel, who would have graduated two episodes earlier if not for his disastrous Icy Corner Challenge, becomes the penultimate graduate, sending Chris, who believed he would be the one to graduate, into the finale with Heather and Madalena. Speaking of Chris, he, Heather and Madalena are ticked off that Manuel graduated over them, as they thought that Manuel's driving was not any better than theirs, but Manuel compared his driving to the others.
8	TBA	November 21, 2005
Mega Challenge: In this challenge, which brings together everything the drivers have learned, they first have to drive the Mercury Grand Marquis through a straightaway, speed up to 60 km/h between a hallway of hay bales, make an emergency stop and reverse. As if the pressure isn't enough, they have to deal with a road rager before U-turning through more obstacles, followed by a short Eye of the Needle section, where they have to speed up to 60 km/h once again before U-turning into a mud hole and finish with another short Eye of the Needle section to the finish, all while the road rager is following behind. Madalena is first up and hits the first set of obstacles almost immediately before going 10 km/h over the required speed, nearly hitting the cop cars in the process. However, she then fails all the remaining parts of the course, including swerving all over during the first Eye of the Needle and nearly running over a cameraman heading for the mud hole. Heather is second and, like Madalena early in her run, hits the first set of obstacles. As if that's not enough, she reverses in the wrong direction, forcing Scott to show Heather the right way to reverse before returning to the role of an inconsiderate road rager. Heather is pressured by this so much, she continues hitting things instead of stopping to regroup, forcing Andrew to clear a path to guide her back on course, to no avail, as she nearly clears the Eye of the Needle before destroying part of the course and nearly spinning out of control while in the mud hole. Chris (the only male nominee remaining after Manuel graduated last episode) is the final driver to take the challenge and his run ends up being the worst of the three; he ends up hitting the same set of vehicles Madalena and Heather did in their runs. Despite the fact that the course was already widened by Heather and Madalena, Chris continues knocking down barriers, including one that flips 5 m (16 ft) in the air. As if that's not enough, while going through the mud hole heading for the finish, Chris brutally hip-checks a hay bale so hard, it kills the car's engine.; Road Test: Drivers must navigate a 19 km (12 mi) course involving 28 turns through downtown Montreal in a Chevrolet Impala, with the beginning in front of Auberge-Restaurant on Bonsecours Street and the ending in front of Edifice Aldred on Rue Saint-Sulpice near Notre-Dame Basilica. Madalena is the first to take the final drive, which goes south almost immediately, as Andrew's voiceover reveals before the drive starts that Madalena partied hard the previous night and she thinks the car being used for the road test is an embarrassment. It is also revealed by Jennifer that Madalena spent too much time drinking while partying and not enough time resting up for the final drive, because Madalena ultimately passes out as soon as she reaches Kondiaronk Belvedere on Mont Royal. After reaching the finish line, Andrew reprimands Madalena for not paying attention, not taking responsibility and constantly treating rehab like a joke. Heather is next and her drive goes relatively well, considering Ernie remained speechless throughout... until Heather reaches a red light at the intersection of San Denis Street and Avenue Duluth East, at which point he tries to warn her against turning right on a red light, as it is illegal in Montreal, as is turning right on a green arrow. She then cuts off an SUV while merging into the left lane on Avenue Viger East before realizing that she's about to merge onto A-720, at which point she swerves to the right approaching the on-ramp and back to the left after passing the on-ramp. Chris is the final driver to take the final drive and gets off to a good start, managing everything up until he reaches Mont Royal flawlessly. Shortly after that, however, he starts making careless mistakes such as turning left onto San Denis when he is instructed to turn right, failing to check his blind spot at the intersection of San Denis Street and San Joseph Boulevard East when an unmarked cop car comes up alongside him on the right and ending up having to turn around in the Rosemont bus terminal, nearly leading to a showdown with a city bus. As if that's not enough, when he finally gets back on track, he continues making mistakes such as running a red light, having to turn into the parking lot of Centre hospitalier de l'Université de Montréal from Rue Sanguinet—leading to a showdown with a medical transport bus—when he misses yet another turn and cutting off a driver while turning onto Saint Urbain Street from Boulevard René-Lévesque East when heading to the finish line.; At the trophy ceremony, Andrew names Heather as the final graduate for her solid road test performance and generally performing well throughout the season, but makes Heather promise to start wearing glasses while driving from now on. After Heather leaves, Andrew announces that, in the end, Chris is named Canada's Worst Driver, judging his inexperience behind the wheel to be a worse sin than Madalena's careless attitude during the Road Test. While Madalena leaves without graduating, Andrew's voiceover revealed that Madalena's father purchased her a new BMW.
9	TBA	TBA
After competition review episode. Taking clips from the other episodes, a series of "lessons" is provided to illustrate the "don'ts" of driving.
10	"Canada's Worst Drivers vs. The World"	TBA
This special compiled clips from Canada's Worst Driver and clips from other shows of the "Worst Driver" franchise, to show which driver is the worst of the world's worst from the competitions.
