= Kal Tire =

Canadian retailer of automotive parts

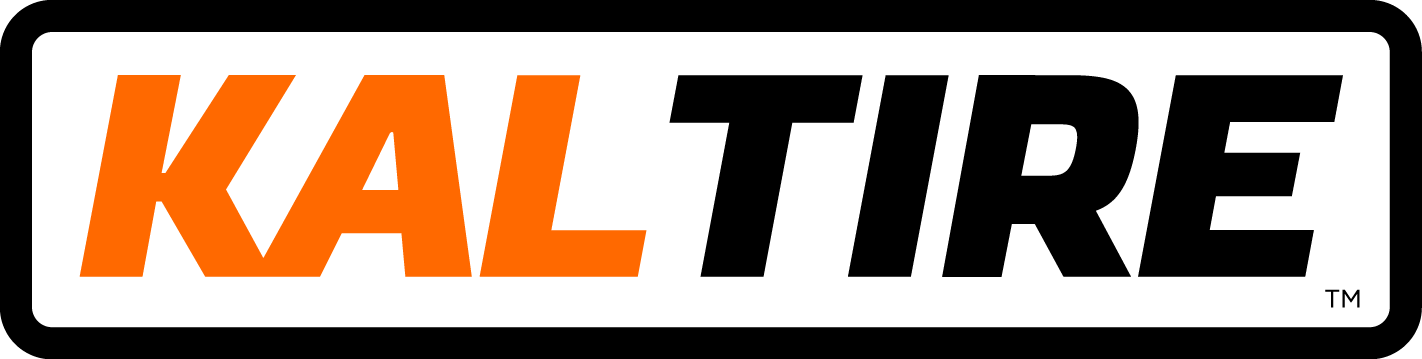

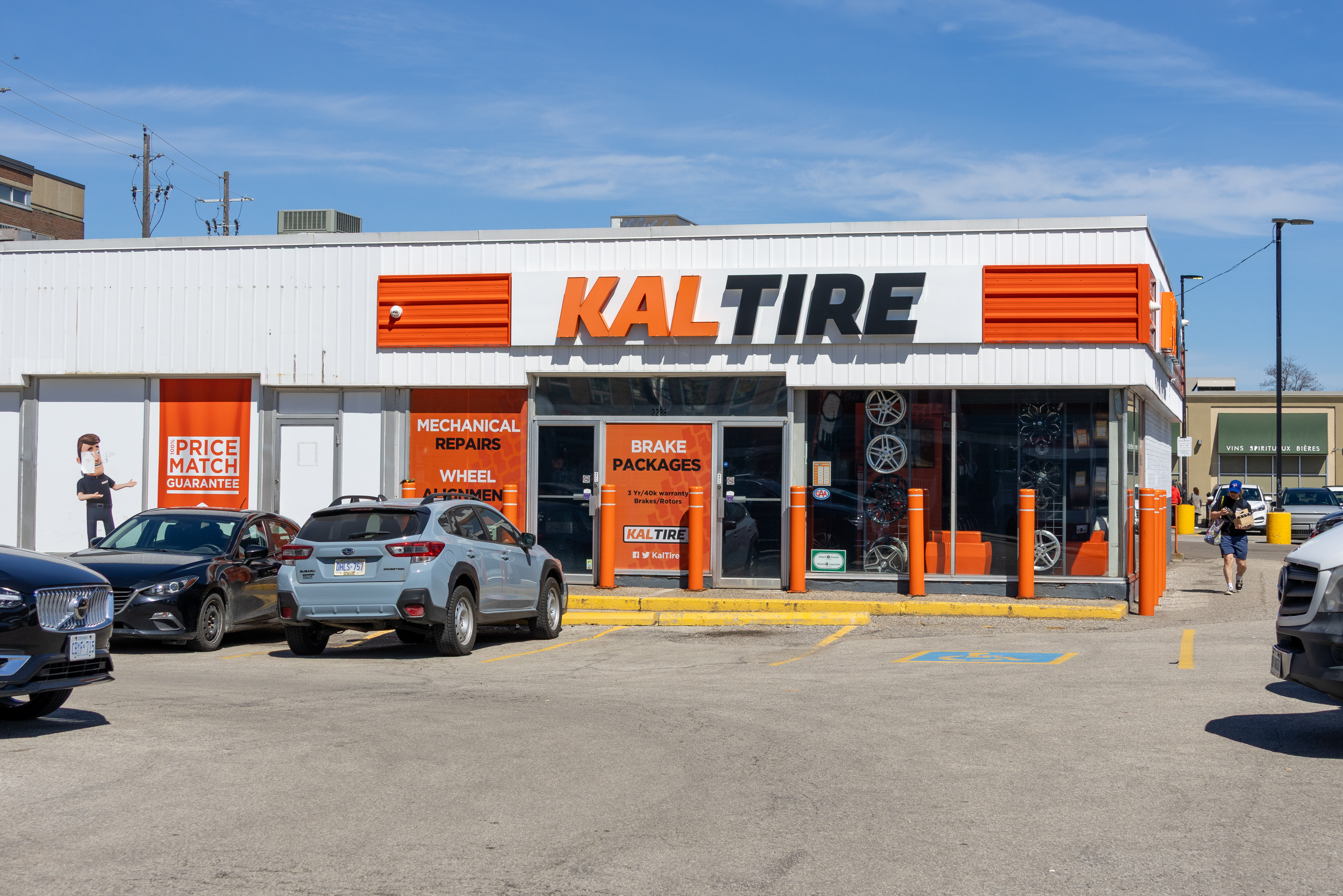
- A Kal Tire location in Toronto
- Type: Private
- Industry: Tire dealer and service provider for retail, commercial and mining customers
- Founded: 1953, Vernon, British Columbia, Canada
- Founder: Thomas J. Foord OBC, Co-Founder
- Headquarters: Vernon, British Columbia, Canada
- Number of locations: 270 store locations in Canada, 5 supply warehouses in Canada, 10 truck tire retread facilities in Canada and 6 earthmover retread facilities across the globe (2025)
- Key people: Corey Parks, President
- Products: Tires and Automotive parts, sales and service
- Number of employees: 6,500 (2025)
- Website: www.kaltire.com www.kaltiremining.com www.commercial.kaltire.com

Kal Tire is a wholly owned Canadian company based in Vernon, British Columbia. Its business consists of retail and commercial tire sales and service for passenger, light truck and commercial vehicles, mechanical services for passenger, light trucks and commercial vehicles, mining and off-road tire sales and service and remanufacturing through the process of retreading, of both commercial and off-road tires.

== History ==
Kal Tire was started in 1953 by Thomas J. Foord and Jim Lochhead with the goal of servicing passenger vehicles and commercial logging operations in the Okanagan Valley around Vernon, British Columbia by building customers' trust.

Kal Tire was named after Kalamalka Lake, the prominent "Lake of Many Colours" landmark in Vernon. The company is still based in Vernon, BC.

Since 1953, Kal Tire has expanded steadily becoming one of Canada’s largest independent tire dealers and one of North America’s largest commercial tire dealers. Kal Tire’s Mining Tire Group is an international leader in mining tire service and supply, servicing more than 150 mine sites across five continents. The company has warehouse facilities across Canada servicing over 270 Kal Tire retail and commercial stores. Kal Tire owns and operates 10 truck tire retread facilities across Canada, plus six earthmover retreading facilities located in Canada, the United Kingdom, Chile, Ghana and Mexico. The company employs more than 6,500 team members.

== AIMS ==
Kal Tire team members in Canada and internationally are guided by the AIMS, seven principles that support team members in making decisions that benefit their team, customers and communities. The AIMS are prominently displayed in every location and meeting room and are regularly reflected upon as part of ongoing team practices.

== Stores ==
Kal Tire stores in Canada serve retail and commercial customers, depending on the market they are in. The core offering is to provide products and services related to tires, brakes and alignments. In addition, there are a few dedicated Fleet Centre locations that provide an expanded offering. There is an increasing commitment to commercial mobile service, enabling commercial customers to reduce their requirement to bring vehicles to a Kal Tire location for service. Currently, the company has more than 500 service trucks providing 24-hour road-side service.

The company’s retail business also has an advanced eCommerce platform in Canada to support its stores. The company also has the only national customer tire storage offering.

== Wholesale and supply ==
There are five Kal Tire warehouses in Canada, totaling over 80 acres of warehouse space and storage facilities, including a recently opened facility in Amaranth, Ontario. Kal Transportation includes approximately 500 units of transportation equipment, moving goods from its warehouses to all locations.

== Remanufacturing ==
Kal Tire produces retreads. The application-specific treads offer like-new performance, while lowering total cost of tire ownership. It has been doing this for more than 50 years.

== Mining Tire Group ==
Kal Tire’s Mining Tire Group (MTG) employs more than 2700 team members providing support to both surface and underground mines across conditions and commodities. The company’s core offering includes proactive, planned tire maintenance, inspections, pressure checks, and inventory management. It is a multi-brand dealer.

Products include a thermal conversion OTR tire recycling facility in Chile, six OTR tire retreading facilities, and a Maple Program for carbon emissions reporting when customers repair or retread a tire vs buying new. An Innovation Centre in Canada designs and develops mining tire maintenance tools that boost safety and efficiency, while TOMS, a proprietary tire maintenance planning tool, elevates fleet use.

== Social impact and community engagement ==
Kal Tire maintains a strong presence in communities across Canada and internationally through its social impact and community programs and initiatives. In Canada, Kal Tire supports local communities through initiatives such as its Tires for Good and Kal’s Replay Fund programs, which combine its core business with community engagement. Internationally, Kal Tire contributes to community groups promoting positive social outcomes in the regions where it operates.
