= Target fixation =

Attentional phenomenon

Target fixation is an attentional phenomenon observed in humans in which an individual becomes so focused on an observed object (be it a target or hazard) that they inadvertently increase their risk of colliding with the object. It is associated with scenarios in which the operator is in control of a high-speed vehicle or other mode of transportation, such as motorists, fighter pilots, race-car drivers, paragliders, and motorcyclists. In such cases, the observer may fixate so intently on the target that they steer in the direction of their gaze, which is often the ultimate cause of a collision. The term target fixation was originally used in World War II fighter-bomber pilot training to describe pilots flying into targets during a strafing or bombing run.

== Cause and effect ==
Target fixation is caused by becoming focused on one thing that is usually distracting, dangerous, or rewarding. Focus can be caused by "anticipated success", such as when trying to arrive at a destination in a certain amount of time while driving.

While experiencing target fixation, a person can be very susceptible to dangerous situations due to lack of awareness of one's surroundings.

== Avoidance ==
To avoid this phenomenon, one can be aware and in control of vision when in a panic mode or in a reward mode. A person should think about what they see and be aware of their environment before making any decisions.

== See also ==
- Tunnel vision (metaphor)
