= Young Drivers of Canada =

Young Drivers of Canada is a Canadian driving school chain, headquartered in Woodbridge, Ontario. In 2017, Young Drivers had 140 locations in six provinces across Canada.

Young Drivers of Canada has three product offerings: the novice Young Driver education program, the Collisionfree! driver improvement course and CogniFit Brain Training.

== History ==
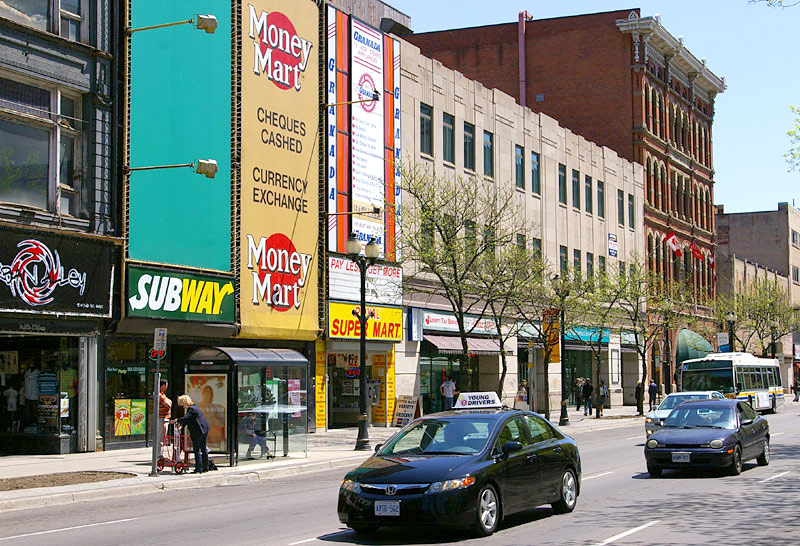
A Young Drivers of Canada automobile on King Street in Hamilton

Young Drivers of Canada was established by Heinz Naumann in 1970.

In 1975, Peter Christianson, a race car driver whose father died in a car accident at a young age, joined the organization.

In 1979, Young Drivers of Canada held their first rally to promote safe driving.

In 1984, Christianson was appointed President of Young Drivers of Canada, and in 1989, Naumann retired and sold his portion of Young Drivers.

In 1987, the company expanded to the United States and in 1990, Young Drivers of Canada, Finland, and Young Drivers Your License to Survive were established.

In 1995, Young Drivers of Canada introduced its Collisionfree! program, with the goal of aiding drivers in developing reactive driving habits. Young Drivers of Canada was directly involved in developing the structure of Ontario's graduated licensing program in Ontario, Canada.

In 1997, with input from Peter Christianson, Young Drivers of Canada contributed to the G2 driving license test requirements.

The U.S. division expanded until 1999, when the Ford Motor Company purchased Young Drivers of Canada. Ford focused development on the Canadian operations and the U.S. division was eventually closed.

In 2003, Young Drivers of Canada introduced its CogniFit program. With the goal of handling issues with reaction time and divided attention. The course was later updated to include a demonstration of the perils of texting and driving.

The Ford Motor Company's interest in Young Drivers of Canada was bought out by private investment in 2005. Their students became involved in protests in front of local liquor stores, carrying the message that drinking and driving were not acceptable.

In 2009, Young Drivers of Canada franchisees experienced a drop in revenue during the Ministry of Transportation Ontario's driving test strike, which continued for four months. During this time period, no road tests were taken, no exams were written and no licenses were issued. About this time, Young Drivers of Canada added a distance education program to the course curriculum.

In 2013, the company began phasing out instruction with manual transmissions.

In 2014, Young Drivers of Canada opened the first Advanced Driving Centre in Markham, Ontario. A mobile app for iOS and Android was introduced in 2016.

Since 2017, Young Drivers of Canada has operated 45 corporate driving centres in Canada with a staff of about 400, many of whom are driving instructors. The head office manages six corporate franchises with 45 classrooms and about 175 employees. There are 42 Young Drivers of Canada franchisees operating 102 classroom locations in Canada, with a total of roughly 225 employees.

In 2018, General Manager of Young Drivers of Canada was on Breakfast Television.

In 2020, Young Drivers incorporated virtual and online courses into their curriculum to facilitate learning during the COVID-19 pandemic.

On March 31, 2021, Peter Christianson retired as president, and the position is now held by Anthony Addesi.
