= Canada's Worst Driver 11 =

- Season 11
- No. of episodes: 8

Release
- Original network: Discovery Channel
- Original release: October 26 – December 14, 2015

Season chronology
- ← Previous; Canada's Worst Driver 10 Next → Canada's Worst Driver 12

Canada's Worst Driver 11 is the eleventh season of the Canadian reality TV show Canada's Worst Driver, which aired on the Discovery Channel. As with previous years, eight people, nominated by their family or friends, enter the Driver Rehabilitation Centre to improve their driving skills. This season, however, nine people (because Shmuel Hoffman and his younger brother, Sholom, nominated each other and, thus, entered rehab together) entered the Driver Rehabilitation Centre to improve their driving skills. The focus of this season was on High-Speed Driving. This year, the Driver Rehabilitation Centre is located at the Dunnville Airport in Dunnville, Ontario for the sixth straight season. The initial drive started in Cayuga, Ontario and the final road test occurred in Hamilton, Ontario.

== Experts ==
- Cam Woolley is the show's longest-serving expert, having been present in every season except the first and has seen the habits of Canadian drivers change drastically since 2000, with the most common offense having changed from DUI to distracted driving. He is the traffic expert on CP24 in Toronto and had a 25-year career as a traffic sergeant with the Ontario Provincial Police.
- Philippe Létourneau is a veteran high-speed driving instructor who counts BMW and Ferrari among his clients. Since joining the show in the third season, the average car has gained considerably in speed and acceleration, with the high-speed emphasis of this season making his job a particularly important one.
- Shyamala Kiru is the show's resident psychotherapist and relationship expert, a position which has become more demanding each year since joining the show in the seventh season, as the stresses in driving and everyday life seem to always be on the increase.
- Tim Danter is the show's head driving instructor, a position he has held since joining the show in the eighth season. In this position, he not only gives the drivers help and instructions for challenges, but gives them further lessons off-screen. With Tim returning for his fourth season (breaking a three-way tie with original head driving instructor Scott Marshall and his predecessor, Peter Mellor), that officially makes him the longest-tenured head instructor in Canada's Worst Driver history.

== Contestants ==
This season features nine contestants, up from the eight featured in the tenth season:

- Renee Boily, 26, from Winnipeg, Manitoba, is a mother who suffers from severe nerves and anxiety to the extent that she constantly drives well below the speed limit, avoids highways at all costs and even refuses to drive her five-year-old son, Ryder, anywhere. Her cousin, Jacque Ehm, has brought her to rehab to get her help. She drives a beige Pontiac Sunfire and drove a red Chevrolet Cobalt to the rehab centre.
- Tina Cook, 46, from Niagara Falls, Ontario, is a mother and grandmother who, by her own admission, is also a perpetually road-raging driver, something evidenced by the profanity-filled stickers which adorn her car. She is nominated by Ashley Cook, one of her six children, out of concern that her behaviour will eventually get her banned from driving, into a serious accident or both. She drives a black Chevrolet Silverado.
- Cameron Donavin, 23 and licensed for four years, from Calgary, Alberta, is a radio newsreader who has done relatively little driving since getting his license. However, the radio station he works at is moving 10 km (6.2 mi) away to the outskirts of the city and his friend and nominator, Kristopher Jay, feels that Cameron still doesn't have the confidence or skill needed to be a regular road commuter. He drives a white Pontiac Sunfire and drove a silver Chevrolet Cobalt to the rehab centre.
- Shmuel Hoffman, 30 and licensed for six months and Sholom Hoffman, 26 and licensed for eight months, from Calgary, Alberta, are brothers who still live together and recently earned their driving licenses but have different issues, with Shmuel being prone to road rage and Sholom being easily distracted. The two brothers nominated each other and were considered equally poor drivers by the producers, making them the first pair of contestants to also act as nominators for each other. Shmuel drives a red Chevrolet Silverado and Sholom drives a black Chevrolet Spark and both drove a dark red Pontiac Montana SV6 to the rehab centre.
- Jillian Matthews, 24 and licensed for five years, from The Goulds, Newfoundland and Labrador, had her confidence in her driving wrecked after getting involved in two accidents in the same day in 2011 and required repeated "practice runs" with her fiancé, Mitchell Kieley, just to be able to drive to her new job, resulting in Mitchell bringing her to rehab to help her regain her confidence. She drives a black Mitsubishi Lancer and drove a black Volkswagen Jetta to the rehab centre.
- Alexander "Alex" Morrison, 25, from Markham, Ontario (near Toronto), takes a very relaxed approach to driving, including not paying attention to the speed limit or other road users and using his knees to steer the car while he eats and drinks. This approach has left his friend, Elysha Daya, genuinely afraid for her life whenever she gets in the car with him. He drives a white Toyota Solara.
- Jordan Paddon, 25 and licensed for eight years, from Scarborough (Toronto), Ontario, has two of the most common major faults seen from drivers on this show—he acts like a bully on the road, constantly cutting off other drivers and pedestrians, while also spending a lot of time distracted by doing his make-up. His mother, Lorraine Paddon, knows that with these habits it'll be a case of when, not if, he eventually gets into serious trouble. He drives a black Hyundai Santa Fe.
- Polly Sargeant, 61 and licensed for 41 years, from Perth, Ontario (near Ottawa), may be the oldest driver this season, but frequently spends more time doing her make-up and nails than focusing on the road, a flaw more often seen with the show's younger contestants. On top of that, she still remains ignorant about many driving laws and lacks experience driving in the city, which has resulted in her son-in-law, Jeff, nominating her for the sake of her many grandchildren, who she often gives car rides to. She drives a black GMC Terrain. Polly passed away on October 9, 2026, aged 73.

== Synopsis ==
| Contestant | 1 | 2 | 3 | 4 | 5 | 6 | 7 | 8 |
|---|---|---|---|---|---|---|---|---|
| Jillian Matthews | IN | IN | IN | IN | IN | IN | IN | CWD |
| Polly Sargeant | IN | IN | IN | IN | IN | IN | IN | RUNNER-UP |
| Sholom Hoffman | IN | IN | IN | IN | IN | IN | IN | 2ND RUNNER-UP |
| Renee Boily | IN | IN | IN | IN | IN | IN | OUT | |
| Jordan Paddon | IN | IN | IN | IN | IN | OUT | | |
| Shmuel Hoffman | IN | IN | IN | OUT | | | | |
| Cameron Donavin | IN | IN | OUT | | | | | |
| Tina Cook | IN | OUT | | | | | | |
| Alex Morrison | IN | OUT | | | | | | |

The contestant became Canada's Worst Driver.
The contestant was runner-up for Canada's Worst Driver.
The contestant was on the panel's shortlist.
The contestant was not the worst or second-worst driver, but failed to graduate from rehab.
The contestant graduated.

== Episodes ==
| No. | Title | Original release date |
|---|---|---|
| 1 | "Ready, Set, Go!" | October 26, 2015 |
The Drive to Rehab: This season, the journey to the Driver Rehabilitation Centre starts from the Cayuga Speedway racing track, with the nine drivers heading to rehab using a provided set of instructions. As part of this season's emphasis on high-speed challenges, the contestants will begin their journey by driving down the track, before joining the public roads. The contestants depart in the following order: Renee, Jordan, Tina, Cameron, Alex, Polly, Jillian, Shmuel and Sholom. Renee is the first to take the drive and proves incredibly nervous whenever there's so much as one other car on the road with her. During the course of her drive, she makes the same vow that Canada's Worst Driver Ever "winner" Kevin Simmons and Canada's Worst Driver 10 "runner-up" Siham Martell did—by saying that should she be named the worst, she will destroy her driving license and give up driving permanently. Jordan is second to take the journey and his self-confessed lack of attention is demonstrated when he's so busy giving his hair a last-minute styling that he fails to notice Andrew signaling him to start his drive. He subsequently spends nearly the entire drive staring at his cellphone. Tina is next and spends most of the journey driving well above the speed limit, sometimes even double the limit. It's also revealed that during her introductory video, she stopped at a friend's house for five minutes to down a vodka cooler and knock back a shot of liquor before going back on the road. Cameron also speeds a lot during his drive, though does follow Andrew's advice not to use his phone at the wheel, a common problem in his everyday driving. Alex is the third driver in a row who spends most of the journey speeding and he also eats and drinks during the course of the drive, much to Elysha's concern. Despite the 36-year age gap, Polly shows much the same set of issues as Alex, not being quite so reckless, but speeding, lighting cigarettes and using her phone while driving. Jillian proves even more nervous than Renee and it's also revealed that she made the same vow as Renee—that should she be named the worst, she will destroy her driving license and give up driving permanently. Shmuel and Sholom are the last to leave the Speedway and since they only have one car between them, Sholom drives the first half of the journey to rehab and Shmuel the second half. When they arrive, they are provided with a second car so that they can both park up and while Shmuel does this with no trouble at all, Sholom has major difficulties. Everyone makes a large number of moving violations on the way to rehab and the contestants arrive in the following order: Tina, Jordan (constantly staring at his cellphone), Renee, Alex (speeding most of the way), Cameron (speeding most of the way), Jillian, Polly, Shmuel and Sholom.; First to Arrive: Tina was the third to leave, but the first to arrive.; Last to Arrive: Sholom and Shmuel were the last, but only because they only had one car between them and both needed to park.; Charger Challenge: Basic Assessment: For this season, the drivers will have a brand new Dodge Charger LX as their recurring challenge car, the most powerful example of such a car seen so far on the show. The first challenge for the drivers is the basic assessment, which has stayed the same with minor variations since the eighth season; in order, they have to reverse the Charger through a corridor of wheel rims, turn it around in a section made up of concrete traffic barriers and blocks and then drive it in a slalom around five foam people at 60 km/h. During his demonstration, Andrew realizes that the barriers are a little too narrow and so has the crew widen them—only for a downpour to then follow, which will make the slalom much harder. Sholom is the first to take the challenge and spends most of it arguing with Shmuel, along with continuing to show his complete lack of reversing skills. Bizarrely, he decides to take the slalom at an even faster speed than recommended, though comes surprisingly close to passing it, only failing because he went too fast to drive between the final pair of people. Shmuel doesn't fare any better, doing just as badly if not worse when reversing, causing just as much damage if not more than Sholom when turning the car around and then failing the slalom because he took it far too slowly. Polly spends most of the first section with her foot on the gas and brake at the same time and ends up rupturing a tire on the wheel rims. She then badly damages the Charger's front bumper in the concrete barriers and comes close to passing the slalom, but hits the second-last foam person. Tina becomes the first driver to pass part of the assessment, flawlessly turning the car around, but still knocks over a lot of wheel rims and then tries to take the slalom at 80 km/h, resulting in her spinning out of control. Alex's reverse is the best so far, only knocking down one set of wheel rims, but he does poorly while turning the car around and then narrowly fails the slalom when he smashes the Charger's wing mirror on a foam person. During her attempt, Renee reveals that she watched previous seasons of the show to brush up on how to do the challenges; this does not seem to help her at all, however, as she has major problems with front-end swing throughout her reverse, then rips off the Charger's already-damaged front bumper while turning it around in the concrete maze. A thick fog then descends on the course and Andrew gives her the option of skipping the slalom, but she insists on doing it anyway, only to fail by smashing the second-last figure. For Jillian's run, Andrew makes Mitchell step out of the car so that she can do it alone; she then has massive trouble getting through the course, breaking down in tears on multiple occasions and needing much prompting just to get the Charger to the required speed on the slalom. Cameron has the best performance of the day, not hitting the car once in the first two sections; his slalom run is perhaps the worst, however, as he completely loses control and destroys every single foam person before spinning out at the end of the course. Jordan, by contrast, is by far the worst performer at this challenge, as he takes 45 minutes just to get halfway through the wheel rims before giving up and refuses to even attempt to turn the car around in the maze and while he actually attempts the slalom (which isn't shown), it's indicated that he failed it at the end of his run. During their first meetings with the experts, all nine contestants deny the possibility that they might be Canada's Worst Driver. As usual, no one graduates in the first episode, as it merely serves as a skills evaluation.; Web Extra: The Road to Rehab: The nine nominees each share their experiences during their drive to rehab. Jordan, Renee and Jillian each blame their nominators for providing bad directions, though Cameron admits that his repeatedly getting lost was his own fault. Tina and Ashley blame each other for their trouble getting to rehab, while Shmuel and Sholom both admit to being equally at fault. Alex accuses Elysha of not doing her job of reading the directions and Elysha in turn accuses Alex of speeding so much that she was never able to give him the directions in time. Polly also blames her nominator, albeit more reluctantly than Tina and Jeff does admit to being responsible for at least one instance of them getting lost. Jacque raises concerns about Renee's eyesight and suggests that she use glasses or contacts, a suggestion Renee laughs off.
| 2 | "Left Right Green Light" | November 2, 2015 |
Head-to-Head Reversing: The first real challenge of the season has the drivers paired off into two Ford Crown Victorias and required to reverse down a lane marked with wheel rims and wooden barriers, turn the car around in a large turning area and then reverse back down their lane; in a new twist on the challenge, however, their starting lanes are directly opposite each other, rather than being in parallel. Before the challenge, Tim will give each pair a lesson in reversing. Jordan and Renee make up the first pair and after hitting a set of wheel rims early on, Jordan panics and floors the gas, taking out much of the course in the process. Renee fares a little better, but still has a lot of minor hits; Andrew also calls her out on sitting far too close to the steering wheel, which would cause the airbag to severely injure or possibly even kill her if it deployed. Jillian and Polly both take some time to get going, after initially not being able to put their cars in reverse. Jillian initially has a lot of trouble due to her nervousness and so Andrew ejects Mitchell from the car and has her drive back and forth up the starting lane; while she has a few minor bumps during the process, she's nonetheless deemed to have passed, thanks to getting over her nerves. Polly never once looks out the back window and while she doesn't actually do too much damage to the course, she fails for not following the lesson. Alex and Cameron are next and both their runs end in failure, with Alex driving recklessly and hitting things throughout and Cameron doing a little better, but causing several hits while turning the car around in the middle. Tina faces Shmuel and Sholom in the last round. Tina is easily the best performer in the challenge, passing without making a single mistake, but Sholom has major trouble even getting the car to move and hits multiple things in the middle section; Shmuel does better than his brother after they swap at the halfway point, but ruins what would otherwise have been a pass by hitting the barriers near the finish line.; Best Performer: Tina, who passed the challenge flawlessly.; Worst Performer: Jordan, for causing more damage to the course than anyone else (Sholom was almost as bad, but only did half of his run before swapping with Shmuel).; Riding the Rails: In a new variation on the "Running the Rails" challenge seen in previous seasons, the drivers have to drive a Jeep Wrangler over two sets of rails, with the first going under the car's right wheels and the second (which starts a few feet before the first finishes) under the left wheels. The drivers will each have five attempts, unless they get stuck and are unable to drive off, as it will cause them to instantly fail. Cameron uses up his first two attempts just getting onto the rails and on his third attempt, he falls off and gets stuck, causing him to fail. Tina nearly passes on her first attempt, but gets overconfident and goes too fast, which causes her to fall off and get stuck. Alex fails in exactly the same way as Tina, though, unlike her, he admits that he got too cocky. Jillian passes without any real difficulty, reinforcing Mitchell's belief that she is a capable driver and that her real problem is her nervousness on the road. Jordan doesn't make a real effort in the challenge; like Cameron, he needs two attempts just to get on the rails and then gets stuck on his third attempt, all the while laughing at his failures. Renee initially does well, but then speeds and drifts to the right, causing her to fall off and get stuck. Sholom proves the worst so far and uses up all five attempts without ever getting more than a few feet up the ramp. As with the previous challenge, Shmuel does better than his brother, but still fares poorly, falling off on the first two attempts and then getting completely stuck on the third. Polly does the first half of the challenge well, but needlessly starts jerking the steering wheel around halfway, causing her to fall off and get stuck.; Best Performer: Jillian, who was the only driver who passed.; Worst Performer: Sholom, who was the only driver not to even be able to get the car on the rails.; Charger Challenge: The Shoulder-Check Challenge: After a lesson in shoulder-checking from Philippe, the drivers have to drive the Charger down a lane at 75 km/h, check over their shoulder for a sign indicating which lane they should turn into and then navigate around a stack of boxes into the correct lane. In a twist however, both lanes will be marked as open, to make sure the drivers actually check over both shoulders. Polly doesn't even make it all the way down the lane, as she pulls the wheel to the right when she shoulder-checks in that direction and ends up crashing into the barriers. Renee is so nervous about the speeds involved that she initially doesn't want to do the challenge and so Andrew gives her a personal demonstration of how to do it, before getting to drive at 100 km/h down the other end of the track. When Renee actually does the challenge, however, she fails by calling out the left lane as red instead of green and then turns too early and smashes the last lane barrier. Alex bizarrely calls out the left sign as "yellow" rather than green, but otherwise carries out the challenge correctly and Andrew agrees to let his mistake slide and call it a pass. For Tina's run, the left-hand sign is changed to being red; she nonetheless passes flawlessly. Despite her continuing nervousness, Jillian also passes without any major problems. Shmuel correctly carries out the shoulder-checks, but steers too late and clips the boxes in the middle, causing him to fail; Andrew also brings attention to his wearing sandals while driving, which he warns Shmuel is not an ideal choice of footwear. Sholom takes the course far too fast (at 100 km/h), only checks over one shoulder and then spins wildly out of control at the end. Cameron makes much the same set of mistakes as Sholom and also panics and pumps the brakes, causing him to spin out of control and destroy a large chunk of the course, which also smashes the Charger's front headlights. Shockingly, Jordan becomes the third driver in a row to make this set of mistakes and ends up losing control even more wildly than either Cameron or Sholom (if that's even possible), thanks to him both pumping the brakes and hitting the gas at the same time.; Best Performer: Jillian and Tina, who both passed the challenge flawlessly (Alex also passed, but called out the sign's colour incorrectly).; Worst Performer: Even though he, Jordan and Sholom all span wildly out of control during their runs, Cameron smashed one of the Charger's headlamps as well.; While Jillian seems the obvious frontrunner to graduate, as she passed every single challenge this episode, she tells the panel that she'd prefer to stay in rehab in order to get more confidence, as she still feels unable to face driving in public. Tina and Alex both express the desire to graduate and the panel note that both are clearly capable of driving well (Tina doing so around motorcyclists due to being an occasional biker herself and Alex being more considerate when driving his grandmother, Pearl), but have doubts over their attitudes. The remaining drivers all admit that they should stay in rehab. Tim votes that Tina should graduate based on her overall better performance in the episode, while Philippe prefers graduating Alex, pointing to Tina's angry, defensive reaction when the panel initially confronted her on her attitude toward driving. Shyamala sides with Tim and Cam with Philippe, leaving Andrew with the deciding vote. In the end, Andrew makes a shock decision and decides that both are equally worthy of graduating, making this the first episode to have a double-graduation since Jodi Slobodesky and Sean McConnell in the penultimate episode of the second season. Before they leave, however, Andrew gives Alex a cardboard cut-out of his grandmother, Pearl, to ensure that he always drives as if she's with him and also confiscates the "If you don't like my driving, f*** off" sign from Tina's car.: Web Extra: Road Signs: In order to make this annual test of drivers' knowledge a little harder, they will only be given brief glimpses of several safety-related road signs, which they then have to identify. While none of the drivers perform well on this test, Renee does the worst, failing to correctly identify a single sign, while Polly fares a little better, only getting two right.
| 3 | "Turtle! Turtle!" | November 9, 2015 |
The Trough: For this year's incarnation of one of the show's longest-running challenges, the drivers must navigate a Suzuki Sidekick through a trough made up of concrete Jersey barriers placed on their side without falling off. The challenge requires understanding of wheel position and front-end swing, with each driver getting just two attempts.; Jordan fails his first attempt when he falls off. After Andrew explains front-end swing, Jordan, although still falling off, is able to improve his performance.; Like Jordan, Cameron fails his first attempt; after getting the same demonstration as Jordan, he passes his second attempt.; Shmuel also fails his first attempt; despite the demonstration, he still fails by overcompensating and turning too wide on the penultimate turn.; Despite getting the demonstration before either of his turns alongside his brother, Sholom fails both attempts by falling off on the first turn.; Like Cameron and Jordan, Renee fails her first attempt, then passes her second attempt.; Polly becomes confused at Jeff's advice and tries to take the corners tighter than normal, resulting in a fail.; Jillian passes on her first attempt without assistance.; Results: Best Performer: Jillian, who was the only driver to pass on her first attempt.; Worst Performer: Sholom, for failing both his runs despite receiving a lesson on how to complete the challenge.; Reverse Figure-Eight: Continuing on the theme of front-end swing, the drivers are tasked with reversing a 1976 Chrysler Town & Country station wagon through a figure-eight course made up of wheel rims and garbage cans. Use of the driver's side mirror is ideal to succeeding here.; Polly, despite being guided by Andrew, makes several hits in the 26 minutes it takes to complete the challenge.; Cameron, despite striking three objects, manages to fare well by not stopping.; Jordan's lack of glasses and poor eyesight cause him to do poorly.; Shmuel, despite his slow speed, fares well during the challenge.; Jillian grows frustrated when she begins to strike objects on the course.; Renee initially struggles during the beginning portion of the challenge; however, she gradually improves despite the amount of objects struck.; Sholom knocks down a majority of the objects in the first corner. (Consequently, Jillian leaves in protest of Sholom's poor performance.); Results: Best Performer: Cameron and Shmuel, Cameron for the fast time and Shmuel for the least amount of hits.; Worst Performer: Sholom knocked down a majority of objects on his attempt.; Charger Challenge - Swerve and Avoid: Philippe gives the drivers an important lesson in how to swerve around suddenly-appearing obstacles, emphasizing the need to avoid hitting the brakes or staring at the obstacle they're trying to avoid. This year's version of the challenge has the contestants driving the Charger at 75 km/h toward a pair of lanes divided by a wall; a turtle will appear in one lane, forcing the drivers to avoid it.; Prior to the challenge, Jordan struggles to understand Philippe's lesson, resulting in him receiving new glasses; during his actual run, Jordan under-steers and then hits the brakes, resulting in a spin out.; Despite initial anxiety, Renee - with the help of her nominator, Jacque - is able to pass the challenge.; Sholom steers directly into the turtle and then leaves the track altogether.; Shmuel not only steers directly towards the turtle, but also speeds and pumps the brakes, nearly flipping the car on a chunk of Styrofoam. (Andrew subsequently brands Shmuel's performance as the worst Swerve and Avoid performance in the show's entire history, surpassing Sly Grosjean's performance from the seventh season - in which he accelerated to 100 km/h, drove straight ahead, and then braked, destroying the centre of the course.); Cameron passes his challenge despite initial doubt.; Jillian initially criticizes Mitchell at responsibility at her inability at driving; despite her frustration, she passes.; Polly correctly swerves away from the turtle, but then uses the acceleration, driving off the course and into a field of mud.; Results: Best Performer: Cameron, Renee, and Jillian all fared well; however, Cameron is proven to have done the challenged with minimal issue compared to Jillian (due to frustration) and Renee (due to anxiety).; Worst Performer: Shmuel, who completely lost control and destroyed most of the course during his run.; When she meets with the experts, Polly admits to having zoned out during the Swerve and Avoid; Cam then informs her of a recent incident where a 66-year-old woman was jailed after fatally injuring two children when she accidentally hit the gas instead of the brakes in a parking lot. Jordan says that his glasses prove to be beneficial, while Sholom admits luck for receiving a driving license. Shmuel withdraws his request to graduate due to his performance on the Swerve and Avoid. Jillian and Renee both reject graduation, but Cameron believes that he's learned enough to graduate. The experts quickly agree that Cameron is the choice to graduate, seeing as how he passed every challenge this episode. Andrew questions the other experts as to whether or not they'd be better not graduating anyone and making Cameron stick around a little longer to fully prove himself; however, Cameron becomes the season's third graduate.: Web Extra - The Speed Perception Challenge: In this test, which was also run last year, the drivers each have to drive at 70 km/h toward a wall made up of foam blocks, then brake sharply to avoid hitting them. Since their instrument panels will be blocked, however, they will have to use their instincts to judge their speed.; Cameron drives at nearly 85 km/h and crashes through the wall forcefully.; Jillian maintains speed precisely 70 km/h throughout her run; she still fails due to late braking.; Sholom takes his run at a slow speed, stopping over a car length short of the wall; Shmuel has the opposite problem by speeding and crashing through the wall.; Polly, Jordan and Renee are all hesitant to drive fast; consequently, none of them drive faster than 50 km/h, stopping short of the wall. (Despite this, they all failed the challenge.)
| 4 | "Nailing The Needle" | November 16, 2015 |
What Do You See?: For the first time since the fifth season (not counting season finales or off-screen practice sessions), the drivers leave the confines of the Driver Rehabilitation Centre for a public drive in the town of Dunnville, in order to get a better idea of how they drive in their everyday lives. Tim will accompany each driver and will ask them to make observations about potential hazards throughout their drive. Jillian, the contestant this challenge is primarily designed to help, is first up, but takes a lot of encouragement from Tim just to even leave the parking lot. During the challenge, she proves extremely nervous and panics at the slightest provocation, along with displaying a lack of practical knowledge on how to drive in public. Despite this, she still insists that she's a good driver, but Tim says that she still has a long way to go. Sholom proves extremely over-cautious, stopping at every single intersection whether or not he's actually required to. Shmuel does well; after being reminded to keep to observing relevant things on the road, he drives competently and is able to keep focused for the remainder of his drive. While Renee doesn't prove anywhere near as nervous as Jillian, she nonetheless keeps focusing far ahead and not identifying vehicles approaching from intersections. On top of that, she also turns out to have no idea what a crosswalk is, causing Tim to point out that stopping in one is a ticketable offense. Jordan initially focuses on the faces of other drivers, but when Tim advises him to look at front wheels instead, he gets the hang of it and performs the best at this challenge. Polly, by contrast, is easily the worst, as she proves generally unobservant and has to be prevented from making a dangerous illegal turn, which would have sent her into the oncoming traffic.; Best Performer: Jordan and Shmuel, who both proved very observant and drove safely during their runs.; Worst Performer: Polly, who didn't get the point of the challenge and nearly turned into an oncoming traffic lane.; Parallel Parking: In order to give the drivers experience in parallel parking tough vehicles, they are given a lesson in parallel parking from Tim and then asked to park a 1976 Cadillac Calais between two other cars. Each driver will have ten attempts. (Before her challenge, Shyamala counsels Jillian and her nominator, Mitchell by addressing Jillian's anxiety and her frustration toward Mitchell, while advising Mitchell to establish firmer boundaries.); Jillian struggles to control the vehicle and repeatedly strikes nearby cars, resulting in her directing frustration at Mitchell. Although Mitchell attempts to stand up to her, an emotional breakdown by Jillian prompts Andrew's assistance.; Polly passes on her first attempt, getting just within the 30 cm (12 in) required to be legally parked.; Sholom strikes the other cars in his first nine attempts, then fails his final attempt "parked" 6 ft (1.8 m) from the footpath.; Jordan fails all ten attempts, after repeatedly choosing a starting position just a few inches to the side of the car in front of the space.; Shmuel takes four attempts, but passes the challenge.; Despite initial struggle, Renee passes on her eight attempt.; Results: Best Performer: Polly, as she passed the challenge quicker than anyone else. (Although Jillian parked successfully, she continued to harshly criticize Mitchell despite attempts to improve, resulting in a fail.); Worst Performer: Sholom, for repeatedly striking the other cars during his runs.; Distracted Driving: Only three of the drivers have valid concerns with distracted driving: Shmuel, who tends to eat while driving); Jordan, who regularly texts and browses the internet, and; Polly, who does her hair and make-up at the wheel.; However, Andrew notes that distracted driving is still one of the leading causes of car-related fatalities and so the three are put through the challenge, which has them driving a 1974 Cadillac Fleetwood through a course, with and without distractions.; Jordan is asked to send a text to Andrew while driving; this, combined with grooming and brushing his teeth, results in him striking several objects. (After his run ends, Jordan is left upset at the thought of how dangerous his driving is.); Polly is asked to groom like Jordan, and her run results in severe damage, including stopping altogether at one point; Jeff points out the dangers of this kind of activity. (After crashing and leaving the course, Polly, like Jordan, is upset at the thought of speeding higher than the 25 km/h of the challenge.); Shmuel gets out a cigarette, resulting in him striking a garbage can and getting it stuck under the car; Andrew uses the destroyed can as evidence of what happens from distracted driving. In subsequent attempts, driving with a coffee results in Shmuel puncturing a tire; when the tire is replaced, he sends Andrew a text, which cause severe damage to the course.; Charger Challenge - Eye of the Needle: This year's version of the challenge has a higher speed than usual, requiring each driver to navigate the Charger through five foam arches at 80 km/h.; After initial speeding, Sholom brings his speed under control after the first arch to successfully complete the challenge as the first driver.; During the challenge, Renee spends most of her run looking at the speedometer, resulting in her smashing the first three arches. (Before her run, Renee drives Andrew to the track at 80 km/h to give her the confidence to complete the actual challenge.); Jordan passes through the first two arches successfully; by increasing his speed to 110 km/h, however, he strikes the third and fifth arches.; Before her run, Andrew gives Jillian a Shyamala-shaped air freshener with self-help tips written on its back. (She subsequently passes.); Sholom drives at over 100 km/h; smashes a majority of the arches; and then spins out of control, traveling off the track into the adjoining field. (Andrew then claims that, despite both brothers nominating each other, Sholom tends to do worse compared to Shmuel.); Polly comes close to passing, but ruins an otherwise good run by smashing the middle arch.; Results: Best Performer: Jillian, for keeping to the correct speed and passing flawlessly. (Shmuel also passed, albeit driving above the required speed.); Worst Performer: Sholom, for leaving the track entirely and getting the car stuck in the mud.; In her meeting with the experts, Jillian admits the effort to not express frustration towards Mitchell, explaining how it is cathartic to her; however, Andrew warns her to avoid expressing anger at Mitchell. Jordan thinks he's learned enough to graduate, as does Shmuel; the remaining drivers admit the need to learn more. Despite Jordan's request and minor reservations as to whether Jillian should remain in rehab when her problems aren't directly related to her driving skills, Andrew and all four experts agree that Shmuel is the obvious choice to graduate, for passing every challenge this episode. (Despite becoming the season's fourth graduate, Shmuel stays as Sholom's nominator, a first for the series.)
| 5 | "Slip And Crash" | November 23, 2015 |
Trailer Parking Challenge: After Tim gives each driver a lesson on driving in reverse with a trailer, the candidates are each given 10 opportunities to back a boat trailer, with boat, attached to a Dodge Grand Caravan minivan, around a fairly sharp corner and through a narrow door into one of Dunnville Airport's hangars. Renee is up first and quickly finishes the challenge, only briefly getting slowed down by a minor jackknife at the halfway point. Jordan proves incredibly slow during his run and after an hour of him fruitlessly trying to get the boat into the hangar, Lorraine bails out and has Andrew direct him for the rest of his run; however, this fails to yield results and Jordan eventually quits. Polly fails to make use of her mirrors and repeatedly jackknifes, eventually having to rely on Jeff to make all the decisions; she eventually gets the boat into the hangar, but her run is deemed a failure due to her over-reliance on Jeff. Jillian does almost as well as Renee and gets the boat into the hangar without major difficulty, but then manages to fail her run by crashing the van into the hangar door. Sholom, who has swapped out his glasses for contact lenses, does okay for the first half of the run, but then repeatedly jackknifes while trying to get the boat into the hangar. He nearly succeeds just as the sun begins setting, but jackknifes in the hangar doorway, with the only saving grace of his run being that it wasn't the worst of the day.; Best Performer: Renee and Jillian were the only two people who passed this challenge, but Renee did slightly better.; Worst Performer: Jordan did the worst, taking an hour and ultimately quitting when he couldn't get the boat into the hangar.; The Longest Reverse in the World: A straight 1.0 km (0.62 miles) lane is set up with various obstacles on the sides, including cars, concrete barriers, wooden boxes and foam shapes, getting a little wider with each section. The candidates are given one chance to reverse down the entire course in the 19 ft (5.8 m) long 1976 Cadillac Calais. The drivers are each told to take it as fast as they reasonably can, but to do it safely. Polly quickly starts hitting things, thanks to her over-steering and veering toward the driver's side, something that Andrew and the experts note is unusual given that the vast majority of bad drivers usually hit on the passenger side. At the end, she admits that she was staring at the driver's side obstacles rather than where she wanted to go. Sholom has a similar set of issues, over-steering and looking from side-to-side rather than at the end of the course and he posts a similarly poor run. Renee does well for most of her run, but gets increasingly flustered, eventually causing her to leave the course altogether and nearly hit the camera car. Jordan has the best run of the day, only hitting two objects late in the course. Jillian starts off well, but her run rapidly falls apart after she hits a parked car early on. Despite Andrew and Mitchell's best efforts, Jillian becomes overwhelmed with stress and ends up hitting a lot of things during her run. After this, Andrew decides to send her on a public drive with Tim and for the most part, she proves far less nervous than she did during the previous episode's public drive, even though she gets nervous while handling lane changes.; Best Performer: Jordan, who only hit two things.; Worst Performer: Renee, as she left the course and nearly hit the camera car.; Charger Challenge: Icy Corner: In an example of the mantra of the show, "Look Where You Want to Go," the candidates are given a lesson by Philippe on avoiding a collision on a low-friction surface by locking up the brakes, looking at the opening where they want the car to go, releasing the brake and steering through the opening. The candidates are then given five chances to get around a simulated icy corner. Jillian nearly passes on her first attempt, but needlessly hits the brakes a second time and locks up the wheels, causing her to fail. She then brakes too long on her second attempt and pumps the brakes on the third, before braking too long again on her fourth run. She becomes stressed and tries to quit at this point, but Andrew calms her down and makes her take her final run, which again ends in failure when she brakes too long and stares at the wall. Jordan doesn't steer at all in his first run and goes straight into the wall; he then brakes too long in his next two runs, then turns too early in his fourth run and fails to let go of his brake at all in his last run. Polly passes easily on her first attempt, much to the shock of Andrew, Jeff and all four experts. Prior to Renee's run, Jacque admits that seeing this challenge in previous seasons saved her from getting into an accident a year previously and Cam and Tim also comment about how they've had members of the public thank them for the useful tips. Renee ultimately fails all five or her runs due to braking too long and over-steering. Prior to his run, Sholom is given a sign reminding him to look where he wants to go, which he had specifically requested in an earlier episode; he duly fails his first run by over-speeding and his next three by under-steering. Andrew decides to stand near the end of the corner to remind him where he wants to look (and thereby drive toward) and he nearly passes, but pumps the brakes and spins out of control.; Best Performer: Polly, who had the only pass in the challenge.; Worst Performer: Jillian; all the drivers except Polly were practically as bad as each other, but Jillian attempted to give up prior to her last run.; Despite the generally very poor performances of everyone in this episode, with only three challenge passes in total (Renee on the first challenge, Jordan on the second and Polly on the third), Jordan and Polly put themselves forward to graduate. Jillian, meanwhile, admits that she should be forced to take more challenges by herself in order to build up her confidence. While the experts consider Jillian the best overall of the remaining drivers, her failure to pass a challenge this episode and admitting to still having confidence issues rules her out as a feasible candidate for graduation. Jordan and Polly are shortlisted simply because they were the only people who wanted to graduate and Jordan receives the half-hearted backing of Shyamala and Cam, while Philippe and Tim just as unenthusiastically support Polly. On further discussion, it's pointed out that Jordan quit the trailer challenge and performed disastrously in the Icy Corner, while Polly had a similarly disastrous run in the reversing challenge and overall seems a much less attentive driver than Jordan. In the end, the experts agree that no one did well enough to be seriously considered for graduation, meaning that the episode ends with nobody leaving rehab.
| 6 | "Soaked And Wet" | November 30, 2015 |
Canada's Worst Parking Lot: For this challenge, each driver is placed in control of a different type of car and they are all sent at the same time into a simulated parking lot. Spaces will periodically open up and the drivers must reverse into an open parking space in one clean move in order to pass. If drivers fail an attempt for any reason, they must take a "penalty lap" around the periphery of the course before making another attempt. Renee gets parked almost immediately and easily passes. Polly also gets parked quite quickly, though she asks to continue in the challenge and get more experience of parking successfully, which Andrew agrees to. Jordan has a lot more trouble and on his first attempt, he is incredibly slow and hits the car behind him; his second attempt doesn't go much quicker, but he does eventually get parked properly. Jillian has a lot of trouble to begin with, as she hits the car behind on her first attempt and as soon as she completes the penalty lap, her car breaks down, forcing her to switch to the car that Renee had been driving. She nearly gets parked correctly on her second go, but hits the car behind her again, forcing her to take another penalty lap. On her third attempt, she finally gets parked correctly, but her overall performance is judged as not worthy of a pass. Sholom never once comes close to parking correctly and, as the last driver remaining on the course, fails the challenge by default.; Best Performer: Renee and Polly, who both got parked up quickly with minimal fuss.; Worst Performer: Sholom, as he was the only driver who couldn't get parked up.; The Water Tank Challenge: In this year's variation of the challenge, the drivers have to drive a Volkswagen New Beetle with a shark-inspired livery and roof-mounted water tank down a straight section of road at 50 km/h, then through a course of wheel rims, over a pair of rails, then stop before they hit a suddenly-appearing baby carriage and finally turn the car around in a section made up of concrete Jersey barriers and blocks. Despite his best efforts, Andrew loses 18 litres (4.8 US gal) during the course of his demonstration, mostly because this year's incarnation is designed to soak drivers who spent too much time going up or down the rails. Sholom is the first to take the challenge and loses a lot of water on the initial straight section thanks to uneven acceleration and sharp braking. He gets through the wheel rims without hitting anything, although he misses the rails altogether, causing him to lose even more water. After that, Sholom hits the baby carriage and pushes it all the way to the concrete barriers, where he breaks the foam tail fin that has been attached to the car's rear. This, along with the amount of denting and scraping that he causes while trying to turn around and a total of 140 litres (37 US gal) of water lost, causes Andrew to comment that Sholom looks not only like Canada's Worst Driver (something even Shmuel has to agree with, considering he was nominated by Sholom to begin with), but very possibly the single worst driver who's ever appeared on the show. Polly doesn't fare much better, losing a lot of water on the initial straight after failing to brake at all and then accelerating and braking erratically throughout her run; she loses 120 litres (32 US gal). Jordan gets off to a bad start by braking sharply at the end of the initial straight, but after that, he loses even less than Andrew did in the corresponding parts of his demonstration and has an overall water loss of just 23 litres (6.1 US gal), by far the best performance of the day. Renee does well initially, but she rapidly loses her nerve (and a huge amount of water) when she hits the baby carriage at some speed. Subsequently, her acceleration becomes very erratic and this combined with a lot of hits while turning around in the concrete barriers causes her to lose a total of 130 litres (34 US gal). Jillian is exempt from this challenge, as the experts are not worried about her pedal control; instead, Andrew drives her and Mitchell into Welland, Ontario, then asks her to drive a 2.6 km (1.6 mi), five-minute route to a Tim Hortons on Niagara Street, guided by a talking GPS unit, this time without anyone else in the car. She proves so nervous that it takes her ten minutes just to get going and during the journey, she goes considerably off-course, though thanks to the GPS' turn-by-turn navigation, it does not take too long for her to get to her destination. Once she arrives, Andrew asks her to make the same journey again, this time in reverse, but she declines, claiming that she's too nervous to do so.; Best Performer: Jordan, who lost only slightly more water than Andrew did in his demonstration.; Worst Performer: Sholom, who he lost more water than anyone else.; Charger Challenge: Reverse Flick: Philippe gives each of the drivers a lesson in how to unbalance the car with a swift, slight turn of the steering wheel and then spin it around 180° with a larger turn of the wheel. The drivers are then given five chances to reverse the Charger into a turning area bordered by foam blocks and spin it around in the area. Sholom is up first and defies the dire predictions of Andrew and the experts by succeeding on his first attempt, finally passing a challenge (ironically, this was also the only challenge Canada's Worst Driver 5 "winner" Angelina Marcantognini passed during her season, even exactly the same day the episodes premiered, although she needed Andrew's help). Actually getting the car into the turning area proves to be Renee's major issue, as it takes her until her fourth attempt to get in there without hitting the entry lane markers; once she actually does so, however, she passes with ease. Andrew then tells her that with all the extra lessons that Jillian's been getting to help with her anxiety, it's only fair that Renee get the same for her fear of the highway. She's then sent with Tim for a drive on-and-off the Chedoke Expressway, which she then has to repeat three times; though she's initially very nervous, by her fourth and final run, she's able to handle being on the expressway relatively calmly. Jordan fails his first attempt when he fails to steer in the reverse portion and hits the entry lane barriers, but on his second attempt, he manages to pass despite not quite turning the car around fully. Polly fails to get into the turning space in four out of her five runs and in the remaining run, doesn't turn the wheel nearly far enough and skids through one of the side walls. After her run ends, Polly admits that her reversing is so bad that she had to cut down two trees next to her driveway at home, as she was constantly hitting them. Jillian also hits the entry barriers in her first run, after which Mitchell volunteers to monitor her speed while she focuses on where she's going; however, Andrew overhears this and orders him out of the car for the rest of her run. All her subsequent attempts end with her needlessly hitting the brakes, which causes her to lose control and repeatedly crash through the walls.; Best Performer: Sholom, who defied expectations by passing on his first attempt.; Worst Performer: Jillian and Polly, as neither of them came close to passing.; In her meeting with the experts, Jillian admits that she's still not ready to face the roads, although she is also confident that she is not Canada's Worst Driver. Sholom also admits that he's nowhere near ready to graduate, as does Polly, who asks for the same public lessons that Jillian and Renee have been getting. Renee wants to graduate, though admits that she doesn't quite feel confident enough to take her son on the highway and wants to get used to doing it herself first, which perturbs the experts. Jordan also wants to graduate, feeling beyond any doubt that he is ready to drive in public again; Cam also compliments him on the huge improvement he's shown in his previously selfish attitude. Andrew and Shyamala favour graduating Jordan for being more confident in himself, while Cam and Tim feel that Renee deserves to graduate for her superior technical abilities; Philippe is therefore left with the deciding vote. At the graduation ceremony, Andrew tells Renee that while there was a strong case to be made for letting her go this episode, she ultimately talked herself out of graduating by admitting that she lacked the confidence to take her son on the highway. Jordan is therefore this episode's graduate and he vows to never again be as blatantly selfish as he was before coming to rehab.
| 7 | "Easy as Pie" | December 7, 2015 |
The Cross: This challenge requires the drivers to use S-turns to gradually turn their vehicle 360° in a cross made up of concrete Jersey barriers and blocks. For this year's challenge, however, they will be using a much larger vehicle: a Wayne Lifeguard bus made up to look like a train.; Jillian becomes frustrated when she is initially denied assistance from Mitchell; later, he cooperates, with Jillian successfully completing the first corner. After Andrew orders Mitchell off the bus, however, Jillian's performance decreases. (During the run, both Andrew and Shyamala note that Jillian's anxiety is proving detrimental to her otherwise decent driving quality.); Sholom not only incorrectly adjusts his mirrors, but neglects to use them, leading to a poor run; Polly's run goes just as poorly, with an additional inability to steer in reverse.; During her run, Renee has Jacque measure the distance between the bus and the barriers (which Andrew considers to be acceptable since Renee is still making her own decisions). She subsequently posts the best performance in this challenge.; After the challenge, word is received that Polly and Sholom are receiving the same public driving lessons that Jillian and Renee have received.: Results: Best Performer: Renee, who completed the challenge with only a few hits.; Worst Performer: Polly and Sholom, who both experienced a huge number of hits. (Jillian performance, while poor, was largely improved thanks to Mitchell's help.); Forward Handbrake J-Turn: After Philippe gives each of the drivers a lesson in how to quickly spin the car around with a handbrake turn, they each have to use this technique to quickly turn a 2002 Honda Civic around in a confined space, while also avoiding a foam person (which features the face of their nominator) in the middle of the space. Each driver gets three chances. Polly's first run quickly turns into a complete disaster, as she carries out the turn far too late and then accidentally floors the gas instead of hitting the brakes, causing her to spin violently out of control. Between this, the similar incident in the Swerve and Avoid and her admission that this is a mistake she often makes outside the show, Andrew voices his opinion that Polly should seriously consider giving up driving. Her remaining two runs prove just as disastrous, as she repeats exactly the same mistake on her second run and then fails to brake at all in her third run. Renee's first two attempts are near-misses, as she only manages to turn the car about 4/5 of the way around. She does only slightly better on her third and final run, but she and Jacque feel it's worthy of a pass; Andrew isn't so certain, however. Sholom predicts that he'll pass on his first attempt, but his confidence proves misplaced and he fails by trying to take the turn too tight. He makes the same mistake on his second run and then pulls the brake far too late in his third, failing altogether. Jillian is forced to drive by herself from the very start and she remains relatively calm in her first run, but fails by trying to take the turn too late. This causes her to completely lose her nerve and she asks to have Mitchell back in the car, but Andrew refuses to allow this and explains in detail where she went wrong. Her second attempt is better, but still ends in failure when she turns too tight. She tries to quit after this, but is coaxed into making a third attempt, which again turns out to be better than the previous run but still a failure, as she turns too late and hits the far wall. Despite this, Mitchell and Jillian admit that she is handling the situation better than she would have earlier in the season and are fighting less.; Best Performer: Renee, since her run was only slightly out from what was required.; Worst Performer: Polly, for twice hitting the gas instead of the brake and losing control of the car.; Know Your Limits: For this challenge, the drivers have to carry out a widely spaced slalom (with foam figures 35 m (115 ft) apart) at 80 km/h, then repeat the slalom with as much (or as little) of a reduction in the slalom's spacing as they feel comfortable with. This was originally scheduled to be the Charger challenge for this episode, but Andrew says that in order to keep the Charger working until the following episode's Mega Challenge, they'll be using the 1976 Town & Country station wagon, with a roof-load of mounted luggage. Renee manages the initial slalom without any trouble, but then asks for a 5 m (16 ft) reduction between the figures, which causes her to smash one of the figures in her second run. Sholom can't even complete the initial slalom, due to his hand-over-hand steering, but wisely asks for the gap between the figures not to be reduced for his second run, which also ends in failure, due to his steering unbalancing the car, though Andrew notes that while Sholom may be a terrible driver, he's at least aware of his issues. Polly goes somewhat under the 80 km/h target speed in her first run, but otherwise passes it without any real trouble. However, she then asks for the same 5 m reduction as Renee and during her second run, she hits the second-last foam person, then closes her eyes and stops steering altogether, causing her to hit the last person dead-on. While the prior three contestants were taking the challenge, Shyamala took Jillian out into Dunnville and got her to undertake three short drives guided by a GPS unit, which she managed to complete despite still being extremely nervous. When she returns to rehab, she admits that she might now have enough confidence to drive in public, but tells Andrew that she wants to take part in the final Road Test in order to prove once and for all that she can drive alone, which Andrew agrees to. When she actually takes this challenge, however, she drives too fast in her initial run and ends up leaving the slalom altogether. She then asks to take her second run at a reduced speed of 50 km/h with the same figure spacing and she completes it flawlessly.; Best Performer: Jillian, since she understood the point of the challenge and passed her second run. Sholom was also given credit for understanding the lesson, though failed both his runs.; Worst Performer: Polly, for insisting on an unrealistic reduction in the figure distance and then closing her eyes and freezing up during her second run.; Renee admits to the experts that they did the right thing by denying her graduation in the last episode and that she now has the confidence to take her son on the highway. Sholom immediately admits that he deserves to be in the final, as does Polly, albeit slightly more reluctantly. Jillian, meanwhile, reiterates her request to stay in rehab for the final episode, believing that if she can complete the road test without anyone else in the car, it'll prove once and for all that she's capable of driving every day. With the agreement between Jillian and Andrew that she will take part in the final road test and Polly and Sholom ruled out as serious contenders for graduation due to their all-around dreadful performances this episode, the experts immediately come to the obvious decision and make Renee this season's penultimate graduate, ensuring that, for the seventh year in a row, there will not be an all-female finale. Note: This episode did not display an opening title screen or broadcast the opening animation.
| 8 | "The Checkered Flag" | December 14, 2015 |
The Forward and Reverse Slalom: For this last traditional challenge, run in both the eighth season and the previous season, the drivers have to drive a 1968 Pontiac Parisienne (something which visibly despairs Andrew, who is a big fan of this particular model) through a foam arch and then slalom around a set of foam pedestrians, both forwards and in reverse. Each driver gets 10 attempts and must finish the challenge within 45 seconds.; Sholom's first attempts take time before he gets the car stuck on one of the foam blocks bordering the course on his fourth attempt, resulting in Shmuel, Jeff, and Mitchell to push the car off the foam block. Afterwards, his runs gradually improve, but he either clips or completely destroys the starting archway. Despite the improved performance, Sholom fails.; Jillian's first four attempts go just as poorly as Sholom's first attempts; Andrew believes the presence of Sholom and Polly is contributing to her anxiety, requesting that Sholom and Polly leave the car. Afterwards, Jillian passes, thus preventing a bonus round that would occur if none of the contestants completed the Forward and Reverse Slalom in a combined 30 attempts.; Polly also takes time on most of her attempts, in addition to clipping the arch and/or the foam figures in the process. For her final run, Polly asks to have a "running start" from the arch. Andrew agrees to start the timer after Polly passes the arch; however, after smashing the front arch, Polly is given an automatic fail.; Results: Best Performer: Jillian, who had the only pass.; Worst Performer: Polly, who never came close to passing.; Charger Challenge: The Mega Challenge: This year's incarnation of the Mega Challenge is largely the same as those used in the previous two seasons, beginning with an Eye of the Needle and Slalom combo, followed by a precision drive forwards and then backwards through a short course of wheel rims (turning the car around in a section of concrete Jersey barriers in the middle), before attempting a reverse flick and then navigating a short second Eye of the Needle course into an Icy Corner.; Polly is able to execute the Eye of the Needle and Slalom combo flawlessly and only strikes two objects in the forward precision steering section; however, her performance quality decreases upon striking 12 objects while reversing. She then fails to arrive at the turning space for the Reverse Flick before striking an arch in the second Eye of the Needle. Finally, she smashes through the wall by locking up her brakes, understeering, and speeding, subsequently failing.; Jillian drives slowly during the Eye of the Needle and Slalom with minimal damage, but then strikes several objects in the precision steering section. She then fails the Reverse Flick by understeering, breaks the Charger's passenger-side wing mirror in the second Eye of the Needle, and then delays braking & drives at an excessive speed during the Icy Corner.; Sholom destroys two of the arches (and another passenger-side wing mirror) in the opening section; however, he is able to navigate the Charger through the first precision steering section and turn it around in the concrete barriers without damage. In contrast, he strikes several objects while reversing, before failing the Reverse Flick after striking the barrier leading into the turning section and then the Icy Corner due to delayed steering.; Results: Best Performer: Jillian, despite the poor performance of all 3 contestants. (Sholom passed only the Reverse Flick and Icy Corner.); Worst Performer: Polly.; Road Test: As with all seasons of the show since the seventh season, the show's decisive drive takes place on the streets of Hamilton, Ontario (this year in a BMW Z4 (E89)) with the beginning and ending at the MacMaster Automotive Resource Centre (MARC) parking lot on Longwood Road South.; Sholom's drive goes well, getting onto the Chedoke Expressway en route to a supermarket parking lot where he gets parked up (albeit somewhat to one side) without major difficulty. Afterwards, he begins committing ticketable offenses; by the end of his drive, Sholom commits seven ticketable offenses that cost a potential $1,135 in fines had he been caught.; Despite Andrew warning her, Polly turns left from the central lane twice within seconds. She completes the highway drive without issue. However, in downtown Hamilton, she commits nine ticketable offenses worth a potential $1,345 in fines had she been caught, including backing up traffic at the intersection of Main Street West and James Street South from being in the wrong lane.; Jillian's anxiety inhibits her from completing the drive without assistance from Andrew. After relying on substantial assistance (including Andrew driving her through the first section and relying heavily on a GPS), she completes a modified version of the route. However, the experts deem her test a failure due to the amount of assistance needed. Despite the assistance, Jillian's anxiety causes her to make several wrong turns (although not illegal) that are corrected with the GPS.; Results: Best Performer: Sholom, who completed a third of the test without making any major errors and even afterwards committed fewer ticketable offenses than Polly did.; Worst Performer: Polly committed more ticketable offenses than Sholom and briefly caused a traffic jam. (Jillian was unable to take the intended test due to anxiety.); In their final meeting with the experts, the three remaining drivers are asked whether they are Canada's Worst Driver: Sholom admits being Canada's Worst Driver; Jillian states that she is not Canada's Worst Driver after initially attempting to not answer, and; Polly states that her driving performance is poor, but not to the point of being named Canada's Worst Driver.; The experts end up in a dilemma; later, Sholom, expected to be given the title of Canada's Worst Driver after his poor performance in the Forward and Reverse Shalom, ends up as the one person who all the experts agree isn't Canada's Worst Driver, as he had an excellent road test and is the most aware of his limitations as a driver.: While Polly is agreed to be an overall worse driver than Jillian, Jillian was unable to attempt the final road test.; Shyamala and Philippe state that Polly's obliviousness makes her the worst driver.; Jn contrast, Andrew and Cam express concern that Jillian's panic attacks are a bigger liability than Polly's obliviousness, leaving Tim with the deciding vote.; The final three drivers assemble for the trophy presentation, with Andrew announcing that Sholom has is not Canada's Worst Driver for his performance on the road test However, his poor track record means that he leaves without graduating, as he passed only one challenge during his time on the show, the Reverse Flick. This leaves Jillian and Polly as the final two (only the third time in the show's history that both of the final two are women and the second in a row). After Sholom leaves, Andrew announces Jillian as Canada's Worst Driver. Initially, Jillian expresses dismay over the fact that she's worse than Polly (or Sholom), but Andrew says that Polly completed the final road test, while Jillian herself didn't. Andrew returns Polly's license to her, asking Jeff to drive her home and recommending that Polly discontinue driving. Jillian becomes the eleventh person (seventh woman) to be awarded the trophy. Despite her struggles on the course, Andrew notes that Jillian demonstrated the potential to eventually become a safer driver. Jillian and Mitchell then leave the rehabilitation centre with their relationship repaired through the season. (Jillian would later return as the nominator for Canada's Worst Driver 13 contestant Ashley Dunne, claiming to have become a much better driver after her time in rehab.)
