= Canada's Worst Driver 13 =

- Season 13

Release
- Original network: Discovery Channel
- Original release: 23 October – 11 December 2017

Season chronology
- ← Previous; Canada's Worst Driver 12 Next → Canada's Worst Driver 14

Canada's Worst Driver 13 is the thirteenth season of the Canadian reality TV show Canada's Worst Driver, which aired on the Discovery Channel. As with previous years, eight people, nominated by their family or friends, enter the Driver Rehabilitation Centre to improve their driving skills. The focus of this season was on the Fears of Driving and the number 13. This year, the Driver Rehabilitation Centre is located at the Dunnville Airport in Dunnville, Ontario, for the eighth straight season. The initial drive started in St. Catharines, Ontario, and the final road test occurred in Hamilton, Ontario.

== Experts ==
- Cam Woolley is the show's longest-serving expert, having been present in every season except the first and has seen the habits of Canadian drivers change drastically since 2000, with the most common offense having changed from DUI to distracted driving. He is the traffic expert on CP24 in Toronto and had a 25-year career as a traffic sergeant with the Ontario Provincial Police.
- Philippe Létourneau is a veteran high-speed driving instructor who counts BMW and Ferrari among his clients. Since joining the show in the third season, the average car has gained considerably in speed and acceleration, with the high-speed emphasis of this season making his job a particularly important one.
- Shyamala Kiru is the show's resident psychotherapist and relationship expert, a position which has become more demanding each year since joining the show in the seventh season, as the stresses in driving and everyday life seem to always be on the increase.
- Tim Danter is the show's head driving instructor, a position he has held since joining the show in the eighth season. In this position, he not only gives the drivers help and instructions for challenges, but gives them further lessons off-screen.

== Contestants ==
- Adam Bourré, 25 and licensed for eight years, from Kitchener, Ontario, is a grocery store clerk who lost his confidence behind the wheel after he skidded on ice and nearly slid into a mailbox. This has caused him such anxiety that he often has to pull over during the short drive to work in order to relax and his father, Pat Bourré, has nominated him out of concern that his stress issues may cost his son his dream job as a Chauffeured Limousine Driver. He drives a silver Hyundai Elantra.
- Ashley Dunne, 26, from The Goulds, Newfoundland and Labrador, only recently earned a driving license and the stress of driving causes her to have severe trouble even managing the short, familiar drive to work, to say nothing of driving elsewhere. Her story is all too familiar to that of her friend, Canada's Worst Driver 11 "winner" Jillian Kieley (née Matthews), who has become the first contestant from a previous season to return as the nominator of a new contestant. She drives a black Hyundai Tucson and drove a black Ford Escape to the rehab centre.
- Shayne Greer, 36 and licensed for three years, from Nepean, Ontario, was involved in a serious traffic accident in 1994 at the age of 13, nearly costing him his legs. He subsequently spent many years recuperating and didn't learn how to drive until 2014, only to have an accident within weeks after getting his license and his first car. He is currently living with his sister, Shanna Boudreau, who wants Shayne to have the independence he has never known, especially so that he can more easily visit his new girlfriend in Ottawa. He drives a silver Chevrolet Sonic.
- Mélanie Lautard, 27, from Oromocto, New Brunswick, is a single mother of four who used to rely on her ex-husband to do all the family's driving, but has now found herself tasked with that responsibility following her divorce. Her inexperience and panicky nature has led her best friend, Christina Harrison, to nominate her. She drives a black Dodge Grand Caravan.
- Travis Murray, 36, from Edmonton, Alberta, only recently earned a driving license after 17 years with a learner's permit, yet he never made a real effort to get one after moving out of his parents' home. Travis only took the test when his wife, Apryl Murray, threatened not to marry him until he got a full license (though she still did, even though he failed the test badly). With the couple thinking of starting a family, Apryl has brought him to rehab in an effort to finally get him a proper driving education. He drives a black Fiat 500L and drove a gray Kia Rio to the rehab centre.
- Joe Palozzi, 50, from Maple, Ontario, sees the road as his personal racing circuit and is prone to speeding, road raging, running red lights and many other moving violations. His business partner, Tony Mancini, no longer feels safe being in the car with him and brought him to rehab with hopes that rehab will make him see that he isn't as good of a driver as he thinks. He drives a white Ford F-250.
- Breanna Pratley, 19, from Milton, Ontario, is a university student who finds driving a highly stressful experience, in part due to her being used to being in control of situations, something that doesn't translate to sharing the road with other drivers and also because she was involved in an accident three years ago. Her grandmother, Georgina (known as Baba G on the show), wants to see her get over her fears and gain her independence. She drives a blue BMW X5.
- Julie Wrzesien, 37, from Edmonton, Alberta, has earned herself the nickname "Crash" for her accident-prone nature behind the wheel, having been in about 16 accidents, writing off four cars (although she told Andrew before heading for rehab she was in 13 accidents). Her best friend, Lara Petersen, no longer sees Julie's bad driving as a laughing matter and has nominated her for the sake of her five-year-old son. She drives a white Toyota 4Runner and drove a white Toyota RAV4 to the rehab centre. Julie passed away from struggles with addiction on July 15, 2025, aged 45.

== Synopsis ==
Contestant	1	2	3	4	5	6	7	8
Mélanie Lautard	IN	IN	IN	IN	IN	IN	IN	CWD
Ashley Dunne	IN	IN	IN	IN	IN	IN	IN	RUNNER-UP
Adam Bourré	IN	IN	IN	IN	IN	IN	IN	OUT
Shayne Greer	IN	IN	IN	IN	IN	IN	OUT	
Travis Murray	IN	IN	IN	IN	IN	OUT		
Breanna Pratley	IN	IN	IN	OUT				
Julie Wrzesien	IN	IN	OUT					
Joe Palozzi	IN	OUT						

The contestant became Canada's Worst Driver.
The contestant was the runner-up for Canada's Worst Driver.
The contestant was on the panel's shortlist.
The contestant graduated.

== Episodes ==
No.	Title	Original release date
1	"It All Begins Now"	October 23, 2017
The Drive to Rehab: This season, the journey to the Driver Rehabilitation Centre starts from Royal Canadian Legion 358 in St. Catharines, Ontario, with seven of the eight drivers (Travis is not present due to being at a family wedding and is represented by a cardboard cutout) having to make their way there via provided directions, a journey that Andrew notes should take an average driver like himself around 90 minutes. The contestants depart in the following order: Breanna (with Andrew making her go first so as to confront her fear of highway driving head-on), Joe, Ashley, Shayne, Mélanie, Adam and Julie. Joe's attitude is the polar opposite of Breanna, as he frequently drives far in excess of the speed limit. Before Ashley leaves, a reunion occurs between Andrew and her nominator, Canada's Worst Driver 11 "winner" Jillian, who tells Andrew that she can now drive without any issues, leading Andrew to subsequently tell Ashley that Jillian's experience is proof that rehab does work. Despite this, Ashley proves even more nervous than Breanna did, constantly asking Jillian to guide her throughout her drive, a trip Andrew narrates after Ashley arrives at rehab saw her cry 14 separate times. Shayne proves to be slow and generally inattentive throughout his drive, running more than one red light in the process, though Shayne openly admits that his inability to concentrate is his biggest issue. When he arrives at rehab, Andrew tells him that they'll be booking him a medical examination as soon as possible, due to fears that he may have sustained an undiagnosed brain injury during his childhood accident. Mélanie is another driver with confidence issues throughout her drive, though despite her own dire predictions, her drive is relatively uneventful. Similarly, Adam is extremely anxious about possibly getting into an accident, but he manages to make it to rehab without any major issues. Julie is the final driver to depart the parking lot and she quickly gets into trouble by missing a required turn, then committing an illegal 90° turn in the middle of the intersection to get back on track. Most of the drivers get to rehab safely, but Breanna's nerves ultimately prove too severe and her cameraman has to take over partway through the drive. It's also implied that Joe's habitual speeding would have caused his drive to be stopped, if not for his two-seater work truck being unable to seat a cameraman. Everyone makes a large number of moving violations on the way to rehab and the contestants arrive in the following order: Joe (speeding the whole way), Ashley (who cried 14 times), Melanie, Adam, Breanna (whose nerves proved too severe to continue driving), Julie (who missed a required turn, then committed an illegal 90° turn) and Shayne (never at the limit the whole trip).; First to Arrive: Joe was the second to leave, but the first to arrive.; Last to Arrive: Shayne was the last.; Slowest to Arrive: Shayne was also the slowest to arrive.; Fastest to Arrive: Joe was the fastest to arrive.; Camaro Challenge: Basic Assessment: In a move that Andrew predicts will once again earn the ire of car enthusiasts, the show has purchased another brand-new supercar for use as the recurring challenge car, namely a 2017 model Camaro. While the challenge remains in the same format that has been in use since Canada's Worst Driver Ever, by starting out with a reversing course made up of wheel rims, then having to turn the car around in a turning area made up of concrete barriers and blocks, followed by a slalom at 50 km/h around five foam figurines, the challenge is made a little easier by the wheel rim course and concrete barrier sections being wider than in previous years and the drivers being afforded use of the Camaro's reversing camera, which the previous challenge cars did not feature. Julie is first to take the challenge and gets through the wheel rims with only a couple of hits, but her overly hasty driving causes her to dent and scrape the car noticeably in the barriers, before clipping a foam person, then panicking and locking up the brakes in the slalom. Travis, who has finally arrived at rehab, proves incredibly slow and takes 22 minutes just to complete the reversing course, while still knocking most of the course down. He fares better while turning the car around, which he manages with comparatively few hits, but his erratically pumping the accelerator causes him to hit all but one of the foam figures in the slalom. Adam's performance is mostly the same as Julie's in the first two sections, with only a few hits while reversing, but more than a few scrapes while turning the car around. After three attempts at taking the slalom which prove far too slow (though without any hits), his fourth attempt goes perfectly and he becomes the first driver to pass at least one segment. Breanna's run proves the worst so far, causing several hits while reversing (despite being one of the only drivers to know what front-end swing is without needing it explained) causing more scrapes in the concrete barriers than all the previous drivers and hitting a foam person in the slalom despite being far too slow. Shayne gets through the reversing course with only a few minor hits, but causes even more damage than Breanna did while turning around in the concrete section and then drives too fast in the slalom, causing him to hit two foam figurines dead-on. Mélanie's run turns out to be particularly poor; forced to take the reversing section without Christina, she knocks over more wheel rims than any of the previous drivers, then severely damages the Camaro's driver-side door in the concrete barriers, before speeding in the slalom and hitting two foam figurines after becoming target-fixated upon them. Joe's run is one of the better ones, passing the reversing section with no trouble and then only having one hit while turning the car around, but he starts out too fast and then ends up too slow in the slalom, before deliberately fishtailing the car at the end of the track, earning both Andrew's and Cam's ire. Ashley relies too heavily on the reversing camera and does poorly in the reversing section, before managing to cause even more damage to the car in the concrete blocks than Mélanie did. Her run then completely falls apart in the slalom, as she speeds and hits every single foam person; Andrew then comments that not only was this the worst performance in any slalom challenge in the show's history, Ashley's overall assessment performance ranks as one of the worst ever seen on the show, if not the absolute worst.; Best Performer: Adam and Joe were the only two people who passed at least one segment of this challenge, but Joe doing slightly better.; Worst Performer: Ashley, who drove carelessly in the turnaround section, and then sped through the slalom and hit every single foam person.; In their first meeting with the experts, Mélanie states that she wants to improve as a driver for the sake of her four children, while Shayne is told that, despite what Andrew has told past contestants, slower doesn't necessarily mean safer. Shayne is also willing to admit that he might be Canada's Worst Driver, as are Ashley and Breanna. The other drivers deny that they might be the worst. As is usual for the show, no one graduates in the first episode, as this was merely a skills evaluation.
2	"Look Here"	October 30, 2017
Head-to-Head Reversing: The first real challenge of the season requires two drivers at a time in one 2006 Honda Civic each to reverse down a pair of lanes, turn the car around in a small area lined with wheel rims and then reverse the car down the lane in which they started. Ashley (who had admitted to Tim in her pre-challenge lesson that at home she exclusively relies on her car's rear camera when reversing) and Mélanie (who doesn't even reverse at all at home and gets someone else to do it for her) are the first pair to take the challenge; Mélanie does reasonably well for most of her run and while she gets careless and causes a couple of hits while reversing, her performance is good enough for a pass. Ashley, however, refuses to apply Tim's lesson and insists on only using the reversing camera, causing her to quickly get stuck and resulting in Mélanie finishing the challenge before Ashley even gets into the turning area. Breanna and Shayne are second to take the challenge and Breanna performs terribly in the first half of the challenge before getting it together and managing to reverse back to the starting line with no hits; Shayne isn't quite as bad as Breanna in the first half of the challenge, but his second half doesn't go any better than his first did and his run is also very slow. Next up are Julie and Travis and Julie performs well, her only issue being a little trouble getting the car turned around at the bottom of the course; Travis, on the other hand, is another driver who refuses to apply Tim's lesson (claiming that he can't use the recommended technique because of poor vision out of his right eye), being very slow and causing several hits during his run. Adam and Joe are the final pair to take the challenge and Joe, already a competent reverser even before attending rehab, quickly finishes the challenge with no issues; Adam eventually manages to finish the course with no major hits, but his run is another very slow one and he also fails to properly use the recommended reversing posture.; Riding the Rails: In a test of the drivers' knowledge of where their wheels are, each driver is tasked with driving a Suzuki Sidekick along a set of rails and then reversing the car along the same rails back to where they started. Falling off the rails and getting stuck will lead to an instant fail. Julie is first up and sets the bar very low, managing to fall off before even getting a full length of the mini SUV onto the rails. Travis doesn't have much trouble getting across going forwards, but then takes six attempts just to get onto the rails in reverse (the drivers are allowed to continue if they fall off, but don't get stuck) and then quickly falls off again and gets completely stuck. Joe and Breanna not only pass with ease, they both remember to adjust their wing-mirrors for reversing without any prompting from Andrew, which Breanna attributes (as a fan of Canada's Worst Driver) to remembering the need to do so from past seasons of the show. Adam gets across going forwards without any major issues, but loses his nerve while reversing and his excessive number of steering adjustments ultimately causes him to fall off. Ashley is forced to take her run without Jillian in the car, so that she will have to think for herself, but this only results in her panicking and falling off halfway through her forward run. Mélanie has her wing-mirrors adjusted for her by Andrew and while she gets across going forwards okay, she still falls off while reversing. Shayne's run is practically a copy of Mélanie's, as he gets across going forward fine, but is only able to make it about halfway across in reverse before falling off.; Best Performer: Joe and Breanna are the only ones that pass this challenge.; Worst Performer: Julie and Ashley, as neither of them made it to the end of the forward portion before falling off the course.; Camaro Challenge: The Shoulder-Check Challenge: In one of the show's oldest challenges, the drivers each have to drive the Camaro at 70 km/h down a straight, check over both shoulders to see which of a pair of markers is green and then steer into the corresponding lane. The drivers each have only one shot at getting it right. Mélanie is up first and her run rapidly turns into a complete disaster, as she never once checks her speed, resulting in her accelerating all the way up to 115 km/h, then losing control of the car and destroying a large chunk of the course. Travis's run is almost as destructive, as he unwittingly turns the wheel when he goes to shoulder check, then loses control and swerves erratically. Shayne practices shoulder-checking before his run and nearly passes, but unwittingly hits the gas pedal while steering, causing him to clip the wall dividing the lanes. Ashley gets a demonstration with Andrew in an attempt to build her confidence, but ends up jerking the wheel back and forth when she turns her head, causing her to hit the lane markers. Julie becomes the first driver to pass the challenge, doing so with no issues, with Andrew subsequently predicting her as this episode's graduate. Adam fails by the narrowest of margins, nicking one of the lane markers when he turns, but is nonetheless credited for understanding the lesson. Breanna achieves the rare dishonour of failing the challenge before even doing her shoulder-check, when she clips the entry lane marker and then fails to identify that both of the markers are actually green. Joe is the final driver to take the challenge and passes with no difficulty, leaving him 3-for-3 with this episode's challenges and in pole position to graduate.; Best Performer: Julie and Joe are the only ones that pass this challenge.; Worst Performer: Mélanie and Travis both lost control and caused the most damages on each of their runs.; When meeting with the experts, Julie makes a strong case for being the season's first graduate, admitting that she's learned a lot and needs to grow up. Joe also expresses a desire to graduate, but damages his chances by admitting that he probably won't slow down if he's allowed to go home and then admits that even if his daughter was in the car in front, he wouldn't slow down. To Joe's shock, his daughter, Kristen, is then brought into the studio and she's able to persuade him to promise to be a safe driver, for his own sake as well as his family's. With it obvious that there's nothing the experts can really teach Joe in terms of technical skills, the discussion quickly turns into one of how he should leave rehab; Tim does not believe his promise to slow down and advocates expelling him rather than letting him graduate. However, the other experts are ultimately convinced enough by Joe's promise to Kristen to allow him to graduate. Before he leaves, Joe is given a rear-view mirror air freshener with Kristen's photograph on it to remind him never to speed again.
3	"Threading"	November 6, 2017
Limo Figure-Eight Challenge: To teach them proper mirror usage and further illustrate the concept of front-end swing, the drivers are each placed at the wheel of a 1991 Cadillac Limousine, with the other six drivers as their passengers. They are then tasked with reversing the vehicle around a figure-eight course of foam blocks, wheel rims and aluminum trash cans, with finishing the course with few or no hits considered more of a priority than getting it done quickly. Travis is up first and, despite being slow and needing more than a little advice from Andrew, finishes the course with only a couple of glancing hits. Breanna also fares respectably well, hitting seven things early on, but getting it together as the challenge goes on. After Pat reveals Adam wants to be a limo driver, Andrew gives him a limo driver's hat and jacket for his run and, like Breanna, he has a slow and shaky start, but improves as the challenge goes on. Julie finishes the challenge with the fastest time thus far, though this causes her to have a couple of hits throughout her run. Mélanie both has the slowest run so far and hits more objects than any of the previous drivers, but her performance is still considered respectable considering her lack of practice at reversing. Shayne is another driver who initially has difficulty, but improves as the course goes on, managing to complete the second half of the figure-eight with no difficulty. Ashley is the last to attempt this challenge and, after some initial trouble, manages the first part of the figure-eight near-flawlessly, becoming the only contestant to complete the first part without having to reposition once; after undermining a foam block-perched Andrew while straightening out, however, she completely loses her nerve and falls apart in the second half.; Fastest Performer: Julie performed the fastest at 8:30.; Slowest Performer: Mélanie performed the slowest at 19:33.; The Trough: In this challenge, designed to both test the drivers' knowledge of where their wheels are and further educate them on front-end swing, they each have three attempts to drive the Suzuki Sidekick through a short course made up of concrete barriers placed on their side, without letting the wheels touch the ground between the barriers. Julie takes the challenge first and quickly completes it with no major issues, other than momentarily getting stuck near the end. Adam seemingly grasps the challenge at first, but after falling off in his first run, he loses his nerve and does successively worse in his next two runs, failing the challenge. Travis quickly fails all three runs, due to either oversteering or understeering on the turns. Before her run, Mélanie admits that she didn't understand the lesson Andrew gave her before the challenge, forcing him to demonstrate it again; despite this, she fails all three runs by turning too tightly, while also failing to use her mirrors. Ashley remembers to adjust her mirrors, but misinterprets the lesson and tries to take the turns tighter instead of looser on her first two runs, then over-compensates and turns too wide on her final attempt. Breanna seemingly grasps the lesson, but fails by not turning quite wide enough on her first two runs and then turning too wide on her third. Shayne has trouble even remembering the lesson and Shanna tries to help him, but this only succeeds in causing the two to argue and Shayne subsequently failing all three runs.; Best Performer: Julie is the only one that passes this challenge.; Worst Performer: Nobody else passes, but Mélanie and Shayne have the dishonour of failing to remember the lesson before the challenge.; Camaro Challenge: The Eye of the Needle: For another of the show's longest-running challenges, the drivers have to drive the Camaro at 80 km/h through a series of five foam arches. Mélanie is up first and after Andrew has to remind her that the intended lesson of the challenge is "look where you want to go" instead of "look where you're going," she ends up smashing three of the arches. Prior to Julie's run, Andrew says that barring it being a complete disaster, she'll almost certainly graduate this episode; she subsequently hits the first two arches and Andrew attributes her failure to her wedge shoes, to which Julie promises she won't wear while driving in the future. Breanna initially forgets to take the car out of parking mode and, like Mélanie, ends up smashing three of the arches, but does worse than Mélanie in that she also destroys one of the Camaro's side panels. Travis speeds up to 90 km/h and ends up smashing all but the last arch, which he can't even steer towards in time due to going too fast; Andrew brands this the worst Eye of the Needle challenge in the show's entire history (surpassing even Angelina Marcantognini's performance from the ninth season, in which she destroyed every single arch; Eye of the Needle was the final challenge Angelina attempted before being removed on medical grounds or the even more worst performance from co-"winner" Flora Wang from the eighth season, in which she pinned the gas pedal to the floor, went up to 140 km/h (as she didn’t know to let her foot off the gas after reaching 70 km/h) spun off the track, nearly flipped the car and destroyed the rear bumper). Adam initially seems resigned to failure, but posts the best run so far, smashing the first arch and lightly hitting the final one, but getting through all the other ones with no problem. Despite having the best run of the day other than Julie, Adam still feels like he failed this challenge. Shayne performs almost as badly as Travis, if not worse, smashing all but the middle arch and his extremely pessimistic outlook to the challenge (and needing to smoke a cigarette before becoming calm enough to be able to attempt it) makes Andrew concerned that there are deeper issues at work with him than just a lack of driving skill. Ashley is the final driver to take the challenge and she ends up being too scared to even attempt to drive through all the arches, deliberately missing the second-to-last one, forcing Andrew to make her do the course again (minus the first two arches, which she smashed on her first attempt and cannot be replaced due to time constraints, although it was the third arch she completely destroyed), but she speeds up to 120 km/h, hits all three remaining arches and, if not for her stepping hard on the brake pedal, most certainly would have spun out of control, causing her to completely break down in tears, leading Jillian to try to help calm her down.; Best Performer: Adam and Julie were the only two people who passed this challenge, but Julie doing slightly better.; Worst Performer: Travis did the worst, smashing the first four arches and unable to steer towards the final arch due to speeding.; When meeting with the experts, Ashley admits that the experience of the previous challenge made her physically ill. Julie is the only person who expresses any wish to graduate and vows never to be distracted at the wheel again. In the end, the experts agree that the decision facing them is obvious and no discussion is needed—Julie, who only narrowly missed graduating the previous episode on the grounds that Kristin convinced Joe to promise that he would no longer speed, is the panel's unanimous choice to graduate this time around.
4	"Look Out!"	November 13, 2017
The Teeter-Totter: In a test of the drivers' pedal control, each driver is given ten minutes to balance a Ford Crown Victoria on a teeter-totter, with proper clutch control paramount to success; unlike past versions of the challenge, this time an automatic transmission car is being used, due to previous drivers on the show having a habit of destroying the clutch on manual transmission cars. Ashley is up first and, after some initial difficulties, not only succeeds in passing her first challenge of the season, but, for the first time since arriving in rehab, doesn't cry. Shayne likewise has some initial difficulty, but soon gets to grips with the challenge and passes. Mélanie gets off to a bad start, repeatedly confusing the gas and brake, along with the "drive" and "parking" modes, but gets it together and passes. Travis' run turns out near-identical to Mélanie's, with initial mix-ups over his gears and pedals, but he's eventually able to pass, despite taking the longest time thus far. Adam quickly passes with no difficulty, finishing with the fastest time of the day. Breanna is the only driver to fail the challenge, as her clumsy pedal control causes her to quickly exceed the allotted ten minutes and, despite being allowed extra time, she never comes close to balancing the teeter-totter.; Fastest Performer: Adam performed the fastest at 2:45.; Slowest Performer: Travis performed the slowest at 5:50.; Best Performer: Adam, Shayne and Ashley were the only three people who passed this challenge in less than four minutes, with Adam finishing in less than three minutes.; Worst Performer: Even though Travis was the slowest of the drivers who did finish this challenge within the time limit, Breanna did the worst, due to her clumsy pedal control and the fact that she was the only one to surpass the 10:00 mark allowed to balance and succeed.; Parallel Parking: After each of the drivers is given a lesson in parallel parking by Tim, they are given the task of parking a 1971 Chevrolet Caprice coupe, which has been outfitted with a reversing camera, between two other cars and not more than 30 cm (12 in) away from the edge of the road. Each driver will have ten attempts. Breanna quickly fails her first nine attempts by understeering when backing into the space, but after Andrew gets into the car and advises her during her final run, she succeeds. Mélanie has the same issue during her run, causing Andrew to also climb in for her final run and, like Breanna, she passes on her last attempt. Ashley only takes two attempts to succeed. Adam's run is much like Breanna's and Mélanie's runs, understeering and backing in too far in his first nine attempts, but passing on his tenth go after Andrew reminds him of the lesson. Shayne also performs likewise, failing nine attempts but passing on his tenth (and notably taking notes after his run). Much to Andrew's disbelief, Travis makes the same mistakes all the previous drivers (barring only Ashley) during his run and also takes until his final run to pass. Despite being arguably the worst performer in the challenge, as none of his first nine attempts go even remotely well, Travis is also able to succeed on his final run.; Best Performer: Ashley was the only one who passed this challenge in less than five attempts, needing only two to succeed.; Worst Performer: Despite a five-way tie, in which, except for Ashley, the other contestants took all ten attempts to succeed, Travis did the worst, as none of his first nine attempts went even remotely well.; Camaro Challenge: Swerve and Avoid: For what is considered to be perhaps the show's most important lesson, the drivers have to approach a wall of foam blocks at 70 km/h, watch for a model black cat that will emerge from one side of the wall and then swerve the car into the lane on the other side of the wall, without hitting the brakes. Adam is up first and fails by initially steering towards the cat, then trying to swerve away too late, causing him to hit the dividing wall. Travis drives too fast in his run, doesn't see the cat at all and leaves it too late to steer, sending him through the wall. Breanna narrowly fails by leaving it too late to correct her steering after swerving, causing her to hit the lane markers. Shayne passes with no trouble, though is actually a little apprehensive about this, thinking that the experts will now graduate him, even though he wants to stay in rehab for longer. Mélanie has the worst run thus far, proving extremely nervous throughout the challenge and then swerving straight into the cat without attempting to correct her course. Ashley is the final driver to take the challenge and for her run, fog suddenly descends on the course, which Andrew notes is one of the conditions in which this skill is most vital; however, her run goes poorly and her understeering causes her to take off the edge of the dividing wall, then run through several lane markers, which results in the Camaro's bumper breaking away.; Best Performer: Shayne is the only one that passes.; Worst Performer: While nobody else passes this challenge, Mélanie did the worst by driving straight into the cat.; While the experts consider Shayne to be the episode's best performer overall, for being the only driver who passed all three challenges, he tells them that he doesn't want to graduate just yet, feeling that he has more to learn. As it turns out, nobody wants to graduate. The experts shortlist Adam (for finishing the Teeter-Totter in the fastest time), Breanna (for performing relatively well on both Parallel Parking and the Swerve and Avoid) and Shayne (for passing all three challenges and the clear improvement in his outlook). After a lengthy discussion, the experts agree that, since Breanna's only real problem is her nervousness on the highway, whereas both Adam and Shayne have deeper underlying issues, they'll offer Breanna a highway drive with Tim and if she can successfully complete it, she'll be allowed to graduate; otherwise, no one will graduate this episode. The drive in question subsequently goes with no issues and, on her return, Breanna is given back her license and becomes the third graduate, ensuring that, for the ninth year in a row, there will not be an all-female finale.
5	"All Wet!"	November 20, 2017
The Longest Reversing Challenge in the World/Highway Drive: For this year's incarnation of the challenge, the drivers have to reverse the Ford Crown Victoria down a 1 km-long course made up of wheel rims, concrete barriers and other cars, with finishing the course cleanly considered more of a priority than doing it quickly. Tim will also be taking some of the drivers through a drive on Ontario Highways 6 and the Chedoke Expressway after they finish reversing, in an attempt to demonstrate that the experience needn't be stressful. Mélanie is up first and finishes the course with nine hits, a performance which isn't considered too bad, but Mélanie herself admits that she still has a lot of room for improvement. When Tim takes her on her public drive, however, she gets extremely stressed just driving towards the Chedoke Expressway and repeatedly lashes out at Tim during the course of the drive, though by the time of a second run on the Chedoke Expressway, she proves a little less stressed. Back at the rehab centre, Ashley is next to take the challenge and has to be repeatedly reminded by Jillian to look out the rear window while reversing; despite a bad start, she finishes the challenge with only six hits. Like Mélanie, Ashley becomes stressed and tearful on the highways, though is eventually able to handle it. Travis has an even cleaner run, hitting four things, while Adam not only has the cleanest run of the day, he hits only one thing; neither of them is required to take a highway drive with Tim, as doing so is not considered a major issue for them. Shayne takes the longest time to finish the challenge, but only hits a single object; his highway run is only briefly shown, but he handles it with less stress than Mélanie or Ashley.; Fastest Performer: Ashley performed the fastest at 6:55.; Slowest Performer: Shayne performed the slowest at 30:26.; Best Performer: Adam and Shayne only hit once.; Worst Performer: Mélanie hit 9 times during her run.; Water-Tank Challenge: In what Andrew reveals was voted the show's most popular challenge in a fan poll in-between this and the previous season, the drivers have to drive a vehicle dubbed the "Carcodile" (actually a 2006-vintage Chrysler 300 made up to look like a crocodile) through a course, with smooth acceleration, braking and steering paramount to keeping the drivers (and their nominators) from being soaked by a water tank filled with 200 litres (53 US gal) mounted on top of the vehicle. Despite his own best efforts, even Andrew isn't able to completely avoid getting wet in his demonstration, though he points out that 5 litres (1.3 US gal) is the least he's lost in a water-tank demonstration thus far. Adam is up first and loses a lot of water right at the start by braking too sharply on the initial 60 km/h straight; the rest of his run subsequently proves very slow and he loses a total of 85 litres (22 US gal); despite Andrew considering his run disappointing, however, it still proves to be the best of the day. Ashley starts getting soaked from the very start of her run due to her erratic acceleration on the initial straight, although she brakes more smoothly than Adam did. Halfway through her run, Andrew decides that she's relying too much on Jillian, whom he asks to leave the car; despite getting stuck in a turning area made up of concrete blocks for nearly a half-hour, she eventually finishes her run with 120 litres (32 US gal) lost. Shayne gets off to the most erratic start yet and his run of passing challenges soon comes crashing down, as his lack of steering and pedal control throughout the challenge results in his losing the most water so far at 135 litres (36 US gal). Travis gets off to another erratic start and has Apryl ordered out of the car for the same reason Andrew asks Jillian to leave the car—for relying on her too much. His run ends up being one of the comparatively better ones, but he still loses 95 litres (25 US gal). Mélanie doesn't even make a real effort in the challenge and despite losing only 105 litres (28 US gal), less than either Ashley or Shayne lost, her performance is judged to be the worst of the day, with the experts seriously questioning her desire to improve as a driver.; Best Performer: Adam, for losing the least water out of all the other drivers.; Worst Performer: Mélanie, who didn't even try to make any effort in this challenge.; Camaro Challenge: Reverse Flick: After being given a lesson by Philippe in how to unbalance the car's steering and spin the car 180°, something that Andrew notes is actually illegal to carry out on public roads, the drivers are each given three attempts to reverse the Camaro into a turning area, then spin the car around and drive it forwards out the other end of the area. Ashley is first to take the challenge, but fails her first two attempts by hitting the barriers leading into the turning area and on her third attempt, steers to late and crashes into the far wall. Mélanie also hits the entry barrier on her first attempt, then turns too early on her second attempt and on her final attempt, she goes too slow and only succeeds in turning the car 90°. Adam is the third driver in a row not to even get into the turning area on his first attempt, but on his second attempt, he successfully passes the challenge. Shayne ends up failing all three of his attempts by speeding and over-steering, causing him to go through the wall of the turning area in his first and third attempts and not even being able to get into the area on his second run. Travis, who had severe trouble carrying out the technique in Philippe's lesson, ends up being the worst performer by far at this challenge, never even managing to make it into the turning area on any of his runs; on top of that, in his second run, he ends up impaling several pieces of wood (from the boxes that make up the lane barriers) through the Camaro's rear bumper, which breaks off when Andrew removes them.; Best Performer: Adam was the only one who needed two attempts to succeed.; Worst Performer: Travis did the worst, impaling several pieces of wood through the Camaro's rear bumper.; For the second episode in a row, none of the drivers have any wish to graduate. Despite this, Shayne and Travis admit that regardless of how much they've improved as drivers, their whole outlook on life is being changed for the better by the experience. With Adam having been the best performer in all three challenges, the experts immediately agree that he's the only even remotely feasible graduate this episode. However, his lack of desire to graduate causes Andrew to override their decision and he tells Adam that he'll only graduate when he feels ready to. Thus, the episode ends, as per usual for the fifth episode of a Canada's Worst Driver season, with no one graduating. Note: This episode did not display an opening title screen or broadcast the opening animation.
6	"No Parking"	November 27, 2017
Canada's Worst Parking Lot: For one of the few challenges that has all the drivers competing at once, the five drivers each have to drive around a simulated parking lot. Spaces will periodically open up, after which a driver will have to either reverse into or parallel-park in the bay. If the driver hits anything while trying to park, or takes any more than the absolute minimum number of manoeuvres to get into a space (one for reversing, two for parallel-parking), they will have to take a "penalty lap" around the perimeter of the parking lot. After a rather chaotic start, in which every driver ends up taking at least a couple of penalty laps before anyone gets parked up correctly, Mélanie, driving a 2001 Chevrolet Express van, becomes the first driver to get parked up correctly. Ashley, despite needing extensive guidance from Jillian when driving a pink 1972 Coupe de Ville, becomes the second driver to get parked up, soon followed by Shayne in the Crown Victoria. Travis, after repeatedly failing at parallel parking the 1971 Chevy Caprice coupe, finally manages to reverse into a bay, earning the fourth and final pass. Adam, in the gold 1991 Cadillac Limousine, is the last driver remaining and thus automatically fails the challenge; adding insult to injury, he then fails to get parked up even after being allotted extra practice time.; Trailer Reversing: In a variation on the Canada's Worst Driver 11 incarnation of this challenge, Tim gives each of the drivers a lesson in reversing with a small trailer, before the drivers each have to reverse the Chevy Express van towing a large Airstream trailer through the doors of one of Dunnville Airport's hangars. Mélanie, who it's revealed has been partying heavily throughout her time on the show, is unable to even handle the initial lesson and is taken to Haldimand War Memorial Hospital suffering from dehydration and exhaustion; consequently, she takes no further part in any challenges this episode. Travis is the first driver to attempt the actual challenge, which he passes with no difficulty. Adam nearly passes on his first go, clipping the hangar's door, but he easily corrects the alignment of the trailer and passes on his second attempt. Ashley has serious trouble remembering the lesson that Tim taught her—Jillian, despite remembering how to do this from her previous appearance on the show, refuses to let Ashley rely on her for all the instructions—and eventually gives up after the trailer repeatedly gets stuck. Shayne, who didn't even really need the lesson to begin with due to having a day job that involves reversing trailers, passes with no problem.; Best Performer: Travis and Shayne were the only two people who passed this challenge with no difficulty, with Shayne doing slightly better.; Worst Performer: Ashley did the worst, having serious trouble remembering the lesson and eventually having to give up.; Camaro Challenge: Forward Handbrake J-Turn: (Since the 2017 Camaro doesn't have a manual handbrake, this episode's extreme driving lesson was taught, practiced and challenged in a 1988 Ford Mustang coupe.) After getting a lesson on how to execute this high-speeds manoeuvre from Philippe (with Andrew noting that this is another challenge that would be illegal to perform on public roads), the drivers are each given four attempts to use the handbrake to spin the third-generation Mustang around 180° in a small turning area, while dodging a foam figure with the face of their nominator on it. Ashley is first up, with Philippe expecting the worst from her run after she repeatedly had trouble understanding the technique during his lesson; his expectations prove well-founded, as she subsequently fails her first three runs by trying to use the footbrake instead of the handbrake and, despite nearly succeeding on her last attempt, she carries out the manoeuvre just a little too late. Shayne's first two runs prove disastrous, the first after he never once touches the handbrake and the second when he unwittingly stomps on the gas pedal, causing him to fishtail out of control, but the third time proves to be the charm, as he passes with inches to spare. Travis volunteers to take his first three runs without Apryl in the car, so that he won't rely on her for help, but they end up going badly wrong, the first two due to not even being able to find the handbrake in time and the third when he drives too fast and turns far too late. Apryl joins him for his fourth and final run, which, like Ashley, he only narrowly fails by attempting the manoeuvre too late. Adam (accompanied by Pat in his first two runs, Andrew in his third and both men in his fourth) fails all four runs by both leaving it too late to pull the brake and failing to look where he wants to go, though like Ashley and Travis, he only narrowly fails his fourth and final attempt.; Best Performer: Shayne passes on his third attempt, the only one of the nominees to pass this challenge.; Worst Performer: Nobody else passes.; Though Mélanie is brought back to rehab for a talk with the experts, she proves too unwell to even manage that and is sent back to her hotel room. All of the other drivers (barring Ashley) express their wish to graduate, though the experts are perturbed by what Shayne tells them, namely that during a public drive on the Chedoke Expressway with Tim in-between the first and second challenges, he could feel an episode of road rage coming on after being challenged by another driver and likely would have cut the other driver off to prove a point had Tim not been there. Adam, Shayne and Travis are all nominated, leading to an intense discussion by the experts. At the graduation ceremony (with Mélanie still absent), while Andrew commends Shayne for his honesty in admitting to his road rage, he also says that after hearing that, there was no way the experts could seriously consider graduating him this week, despite being the only driver who passed all three challenges. That leaves Adam and Travis and despite Adam being considered the best overall driver of the group, Travis' performing better than Adam in every challenge this week and seeming more assured than Adam in his own public drive with Tim ends up swinging the decision his way, making Travis the latest graduate. Note: The credits that rolled after the conclusion of "The Trailer Parking Boys" credited Canada's Worst Driver 2 "runner-up" Michael Telford as "super computer," Canada's Worst Driver 3 "winner" Jason Zhang as "the quitter," Canada's Worst Driver 5 "runner-up" Michael "Mike" Butt as "muffler murderer," Canada's Worst Driver 6 "winner" Lance Morin as "worst actor," Canada's Worst Driver 7 "runner-up" Sly Grosjean as "Dunnville destroyer," Canada's Worst Driver 10 "winner" Chanie Richard as "the cheerleader," Canada's Worst Driver 12 "winner" Krystal McCann as "potato" and Advanced Motoring Bureau instructor Peter Mellor as "the South African Guy from Seasons 5, 6 and 7," among others. The credits also stated that "no antique vehicles were harmed during the filming of this production. This unreal driving is a piece of work."
7	"Ice, Ice, Maybe"	December 4, 2017
Know Your Limits Slalom: In a test of the drivers' awareness of their own abilities and limitations, each is asked to drive the 1991 Cadillac Limousine on a slalom course with foam figures spaced 35 m (115 ft) apart. They will then be asked to take a second run, with the gaps between the figures narrowed to a distance of their choosing. Ashley is up first and, in a far cry from her disastrous performance in the initial assessment, passes the first slalom with ease. However, this causes her to become overconfident and she asks for an 8 m (26 ft) reduction in the distance, which causes her to lose control of the car, hit the last foam person and nearly spin off the tarmac. Adam also manages his initial run with no trouble, but then makes a surprise request; instead of insisting on a single, large reduction, he asks for a series of additional runs with a further 2 m (6.6 ft) reduction each time. Consequently, he manages runs with 2 m (6.6 ft) and 4 m (13 ft) reductions fine, but 6 m (20 ft) proves a bridge too far and Adam subsequently admits that he should have stopped at his 4 m (13 ft) run. Mélanie handles her initial run reasonably well, albeit she becomes stressed out; despite this, she insists on the biggest reduction yet, at 10 m (33 ft), resulting in her second run rapidly turning into a total disaster, as she spins off the course altogether and her attitude leaves Andrew and the experts increasingly convinced that Mélanie is the worst driver of the group. Prior to Shayne's run, he's taken to a nearby medical clinic and given an MRI scan, where it turns out that, contrary to Andrew's earlier fears that he might have sustained a brain injury in his childhood accident, Shayne is just fine from a physical standpoint. Despite this, he ends up becoming the only driver to fail his initial run, hitting the second-last foam person, after which he admits becoming target-fixated on and steering towards it. As a result, he instead asks for the distance between the figures to be extended by 5 m (16 ft), which he passes with no problem, preventing this challenge from having a 100% failure rate.; Best Performer: Shayne, who was the only driver that knew his limits.; Worst Performer: Mélanie, as she carelessly reduced the spaces and went off the road.; The Cross: For this year's version of this challenge, each driver is placed at the wheel of a Type-C school bus and asked to turn the bus around 360° in a large cross made up of concrete blocks, with usage of mirrors and S-turns paramount to success. Ashley is up first and, despite initially doing well, she becomes increasingly careless and impatient, finishing the challenge with 12 hits. Adam, despite taking longer to get into the cross' first alcove than it took Andrew to complete his entire demonstration, soon gets the hang of the challenge and finishes with only two hits. Shayne also does well, taking a little longer than Adam, but also getting through with just two hits. Mélanie isn't asked to take the challenge and instead is sent on another public drive with Tim, which will include practicing parking up in parking lots. Despite this, she remains unfocused and uncommunicative throughout the drive. Ashley also gets taken on a public drive, which, for the most part, she manages better than Mélanie did, but she still proves very nervous while driving on the Chedoke Expressway and admits that she still couldn't do it without Tim being in the car.; Fastest Performer: Adam performed the fastest at 16:45.; Slowest Performer: Ashley performed the slowest at 45:20.; Best Performer: Adam and Shayne were the only two people who did remotely well, finishing with only two hits, but Adam finishing almost 5:00 faster.; Worst Performer: Ashley did the worst, finishing with 12 hits and taking the longest time of the three drivers who did take the challenge.; Camaro Challenge: The Icy Corner: In what is considered one of the show's most crucial challenges, each driver is given a lesson from Philippe in how to steer the car through a skid, followed by five attempts to navigate the Camaro around a simulated icy corner. Mélanie speeds and locks up the brakes on her first three runs, then continues to speed and oversteers on her final two attempts, failing. For Adam, success in this challenge is paramount, as the accident that robbed him of his confidence was caused by icy conditions. Adam fails his first run by braking far too early, then his second by oversteering, which causes him to completely lose his confidence and completely break down. Despite this, a pep-talk by Andrew and Pat gets him back into the game and he passes on his third attempt. Shayne does even better and passes on his first attempt, putting himself in pole position to graduate this week. Ashley takes her runs with Shyamala as a passenger, due to concerns by Andrew that Ashley is taking Shyamala's advice to "embrace failure" a little too literally and not making enough of an effort in the challenges. She subsequently fails her first run by speeding and pumping the brakes and her next three by oversteering; Andrew takes over as passenger for her last run, but she speeds once again, causing her to fail.; Best Performer: Shayne, who passed on his first attempt and did the most perfect threshold braking (according to Philippe). Adam also did it, on his third try.; Worst Performer: Melanie, who constantly oversped and oversteered and never once look where she wanted to go. Ashley was almost as bad as Melanie, but at least did slightly better by looking where she wanted to go.; When meeting with the experts, Melanie is sharply criticized by Tim for her repeated failure to apply the lessons he's repeatedly being trying to teach her in their public drives and she admits that she's destined for the finale, as does Ashley. Both Adam and Shayne do want to graduate, however, leading to both being shortlisted. Cam and Philippe both vote for Shayne to graduate, for performing as well as or better than Adam in all of the challenges this episode, while Andrew and Shayamala vote that it should be Adam, citing Shayne's failure in the initial part of the Know Your Limits challenge, leaving Tim with the deciding vote. Despite being shortlisted for the fourth week in a row, Adam misses out on graduation on the grounds that one of the other drivers was just that bit better, making Shayne, who only missed graduating the previous episode on the grounds that he admitted to the experts that he felt an episode of road rage coming on during his public drive with Tim and the fact that Travis performed better than Adam in every challenge and seeming more assured in his own public drive, the season's penultimate graduate and sending Adam into the finale with Mélanie and Ashley, with Adam joining Canada's Worst Driver 4 "winner" Ashley van Ham for the most shortlistings in the Canada's Worst Driver history and not once graduating.
8	"Drum Roll, Please..."	December 11, 2017
The Forward and Reverse Slalom: For this last traditional challenge, run in Canada's Worst Driver 8, Canada's Worst Driver 10, Canada's Worst Driver 11 and the previous season, the drivers have to drive a 1972 Cadillac Coupe de Ville through a foam arch and then slalom around a set of foam pedestrians, both forwards and in reverse. Each driver gets 10 attempts and must finish the challenge within 45 seconds and even Andrew finishes with just a second-and-a-half to spare in his demonstration. Adam (the only male nominee remaining after Shayne graduated last episode) volunteers to take the challenge first, hitting foam figures going forwards on his first attempt, then doing the same while reversing on his second. His third and fourth attempts are far too slow and he nearly passes his fifth, but clips the starting archway near the end. After that, he never comes close to passing on any of his next five attempts, always proving too slow and hitting things. Ashley fares even worse to begin with, veering wildly around the course while reversing and repeatedly demolishing the starting arch. Her sixth, seventh and eighth attempts go similarly to Adam's third and fourth, in that they are far too slow. Before taking her ninth attempt, Jillian suggests letting Ashley take her next attempt alone, remembering that it was Andrew who suggested the same thing to her then-fiancé, Mitchell, during Jillian's own attempt on the show, in which she was the only driver to pass (and on her fifth attempt, no less, preventing a bonus round from happening), after which she and Mitchell embraced with a hug; unfortunately, this does nothing to help Ashley, who does just as poorly on the subsequent attempt, if not worse. For her final attempt, Andrew gets in the car and gives Ashley words of encouragement and while it does end up being her best attempt of the challenge, she again fails by smashing the starting arch, leaving her completely despondent. Mélanie's performance goes similarly to Adam's, not even managing the forwards run on her first two attempts and then proving clean, but much too slow on her next five attempts. Her eighth attempt is similar to Adam's fifth, ending in a narrow failure when she clips the arch and then she completely falls apart on her last two attempts, meaning that for the first time in the show's history, no one succeeds at this challenge, leading Andrew to propose a first-ever "Bonus Round" in which the drivers will each get turns in posting a successful run and, much to Andrew's surprise, all three are successful at the first time of asking, with Ashley's run being the fastest, after which all three (and even Jillian on the sidelines) get emotional.; Camaro Challenge: The Mega Challenge: In this challenge, which brings together everything the drivers have learned, they first have to drive the Camaro through an Eye of the Needle and Slalom combo, then drive precision steering sections in both directions (while turning the car around in a concrete barrier section in-between), then carry out a Reverse Flick, followed by a short Eye of the Needle section and finally an Icy Corner. Adam is first up again and completes everything up until the end of the precision steering flawlessly. However, he then fails all the remaining parts of the course, though his overall performance is still considered quite creditable somewhat. Mélanie is second and she gets off to a bad start by hitting two arches in the opening section of the course. She at least manages the precision steering with no hits, then successfully carries out the Reverse Flick despite not really being sure on the correct technique (something Adam couldn't do), but ends up failing the Icy Corner. Ashley is the final driver to take the challenge and her run ends up being the worst of the three; she ends up hitting the same two arches that Mélanie did in her run, smashing the Camaro's passenger-side mirror in the process, then does so poorly in the precision steering that she ends up bursting a rear tire and breaking down yet again. After that, she's ready to give up on her run and declare herself Canada's Worst Driver, but Andrew forces her to continue (against her better judgment) and she narrowly fails the Reverse Flick, only spinning the car 90° after she hits the brakes, after which she fails both the Eye of the Needle and Icy Corner. After this, Andrew says that while none of the final three have done especially well, Ashley is now looking like the worst.; Best Performer: Adam and Melanie were the only people who passed the same amount of components in the Mega Challenge, but with Adam doing slightly better.; Worst Performer: Ashley did the worst, failing every component, taking the most time and hitting more things than either Mélanie or Adam.; Fastest Performer: Adam, completing the Challenge at 24:12.; Slowest Performer: Ashley, completing the Challenge at 37:15.; Road Test: As with all seasons of the show since the seventh season, the final drive has each of the three finalists driving Andrew through Hamilton, Ontario, this year in a 2017 Porsche 911 Carrera, with the beginning and ending at the Eaton Centre Parkade on Vine Street. For the first time, there will be two separate drives on the Chedoke Expressway—a short, 3 km (1.9 mi) one early in the challenge and then a longer one later on. Adam is the first to take the final drive and gets off to a good start, managing everything up until his second highway drive flawlessly. Shortly after that, however, he commits his only moving violation of the drive when he runs a red light at the intersection of Golf Links Road and Cloverleaf Drive, but this ultimately turns out to be the only ticketable offense he commits during his run and one of only a few mistakes overall from all three drivers. Near the end of his run, after Adam comments now that he's overcome his fear of driving, he'd like to try riding a ferris wheel to overcome his fear of heights; Andrew recommends that when he leaves rehab, he drive to Niagara Falls and try the wheel there, which he agrees to. Mélanie is intimidated just by the thought of driving the Porsche and has to take two laps of the starting parkade roof level just to be able to attempt the final drive. Andrew tries advising her to think positively, but she never does so during the drive and is visibly stressed and annoyed at all times and also refuses to carry out a running commentary of what she sees when Andrew asks her to. Despite this, Mélanie doesn't commit much more in the way of actual mistakes than Adam did, but her negativity and over-reliance on Andrew's advice makes for a generally miserable experience for both. Ashley is the final driver to attempt the challenge and performs perfectly up until her initial highway drive, only being let down by occasionally erratic steering. While Ashley spends most of her drive being on-course for a rare perfect run, she ends up committing arguably the most serious mistake of any of the finalists—nearly running down a distracted pedestrian while turning left through a crosswalk-- twice. Despite this, she manages to keep her nerve and finish with zero ticketable offenses and, more importantly, zero tears.; Best Performer: Adam, who, in spite of committing a few traffic violations, was able to complete the drive with confidence and a clear improvement on his driving outlook.; Worst Performer: Ashley, who nearly ran over a pedestrian while attempting to make a left turn (in spite of having no ticketable offenses on her run, it was considered the most major mistake out of the final drives this season).; In their final meeting with the experts, Ashley openly admits that, had Andrew not been with her, she would more than likely have hit the pedestrian during her drive. Despite this, not only does Ashley believe she is not Canada's Worst Driver, she actually claims that she deserves to be the final graduate. Adam also feels that he deserves to graduate, more justifiably in the eyes of the experts. Mélanie, however, admits that she might be Canada's Worst Driver and that, due to being a single mother, she can't realistically afford more driving tuition. In the ensuing discussions, the panel seems to quickly come to the agreement that Adam, who had been shortlisted four weeks in a row, only to narrowly miss graduating each episode on the grounds that Breanna successfully completed her highway drive with Tim, his lack of desire to graduate despite being the only feasible graduate, Travis performing better in every challenge and seeming more assured in his own public drive and Shayne performing as well as or better than Adam in every challenge, is the final graduate, while Mélanie is Canada's Worst Driver for never making a serious effort to improve throughout the season. However, Philippe then dissents and deems Ashley the worst for her dismal Mega-Challenge performance and nearly causing a serious accident in the road test and Cam sides with him, pointing out that, as poor and negative as Mélanie's attitude in the final drive was, her mistakes were comparatively minor. To Andrew's shock, Shyamala then changes her own mind and agrees with Cam and Philippe in that Ashley is Canada's Worst Driver. Tim, however, sticks to his initial decision and judges Mélanie to be the worst, something Andrew agrees with, leaving Shyamala, who Andrew feels is still somewhat on the fence, with the final decision. At the trophy ceremony, Andrew names Adam as the final graduate for his solid road test and generally performing well throughout the season and Adam leaves, declaring that his next stop is the Ferris wheel in Niagara Falls. This, therefore, leaves Mélanie and Ashley as the final two. After Adam leaves, Andrew makes the announcement that, in the end, Mélanie is named Canada's Worst Driver, judging her general lack of effort and bad attitude throughout the season to be a worse sin than Ashley's mistake in her final run, especially considering that Mélanie has four children who depend on her. While Ashley leaves without graduating, both Andrew and Jillian give her words of encouragement for avoiding Jillian's fate during her own appearance on the show, where she was named the worst after being unable to even attempt the Road Test on her own and Ashley is at least able to drive herself away, something Jillian was not able to do during her own appearance, as Mitchell had to drive her away. As for Melanie, despite being named the worst, she does get one bit of good news in that, since the experts do not believe she is such a bad driver that she should give up driving completely (especially given the consequences doing so would have for her children), they have arranged for her to have driving lessons when she gets home. Despite this, Mélanie gives Andrew the finger as Christina drives her away as the thirteenth person (and final woman) to be awarded the trophy, with Andrew's closing voiceover revealing that, despite the show paying for extra lessons in advance, Mélanie never once bothered using them.

== Production ==
Open nominations for Canada's Worst Driver were collected in March 2017. A scouting team then reviewed approximately 900 to 1,000 nominations. Individual appointments were then set by series' head of casting, Meredith Veats, to arrive at the "Elite Eight" who would appear on the series.

Shooting took place in Summer 2017.
