= Canada's Worst Driver 14 =

- Season 14
- Hosted by: Andrew Younghusband
- Judges: Tim Danter; Shyamala Kiru; Philippe Létourneau; Cam Woolley
- No. of contestants: 7
- Winner: Brandon Wilkins
- Runner-up: Alexis Pratola
- Location: Dunnville Airport; Hamilton, Ontario
- No. of episodes: 8

Release
- Original network: Discovery Channel
- Original release: October 29 – December 17, 2018

Season chronology
- ← Previous; Season 13

Canada's Worst Driver 14 is the fourteenth and final season of the Canadian competitive reality television series Canada's Worst Driver. This season is the ninth consecutive season filmed at the Dunnville Airport in Dunnville, Ontario. It premiered on October 29, 2018 on the Discovery Channel in Canada. After a final road test in Hamilton, Ontario, the season concluded on December 17, 2018, when Brandon Wilkins was named Canada's Worst Driver.

This season's theme was the "Evolution of Driving" and saw the introduction of several modern technological devices such as GPS navigation, backup cameras, and automatic trailer reversing.

== Contestants ==
This season features seven contestants, down from the eight featured in the previous season.

List of Canada's Worst Driver 14 contestants
Contestant	Age	From	Vehicle	Notes	Finish
Ryan Whittier	39	Bedford, Nova Scotia	Mercedes-Benz C-Class	Father of three who, in addition to being an aggressive driver, has also driven while impaired.	1st graduate
Darris Wilderman	22	Calgary, Alberta	Chevrolet Avalanche	Drives aggressively and has written off four cars and accumulated over 100 traffic tickets.	2nd graduate
Karlene Bowen	62	Airdrie, Alberta	BMW X5	Uncomfortable behind the wheel due to being struck by a vehicle as a pedestrian 13 years ago, requiring two years of recovery and physiotherapy.	3rd graduate
Descyara "Descy" McMurray	28	Campbellford, Ontario	Hyundai Accent	Self-taught "erratic and reckless" driver nominated after getting into six collisions in just over one year.	4th graduate
Brittany Dube	32	Victoria, British Columbia	Hyundai Elantra	Suffers from "severe anxiety", accumulated approximately 60 traffic tickets, texts "all the time when [she] drive[s]".	5th graduate
Alexis Pratola	21	Thunder Bay, Ontario	Hyundai Elantra	Distracted driver; damaged six cars and was T-boned with her infant daughter on board.	Runner-up
Brandon Wilkins	20	Saint John, New Brunswick	Toyota Corolla	Only licensed for 10 months. Struggles with basic driving skills and is impatient while operating a vehicle, leading to 35 accidents and five cars being written off. He also experiences anxiety while driving, which sometimes manifests itself as aggression.	Worst

== Experts ==
- Cam Woolley is the show's longest-serving expert, having been present in every season except the first and has seen the habits of Canadian drivers change drastically since 2000, with the most common offense having changed from DUI to distracted driving. He is the traffic expert on CP24 in Toronto and had a 25-year career as a traffic sergeant with the Ontario Provincial Police.
- Philippe Létourneau is a veteran high-speed driving instructor who counts BMW and Ferrari among his clients. Since joining the show in the third season, the average car has gained considerably in speed and acceleration, making his job a particularly important one.
- Shyamala Kiru is the show's resident psychotherapist and relationship expert, a position which has become more demanding each year since joining the show in the seventh season, as the stresses in driving and everyday life seem to always be on the increase.
- Tim Danter is the show's head driving instructor, a position he has held since joining the show in the eighth season. In this position, he not only gives the drivers help and instructions for challenges, but gives them further lessons off-screen.

== Challenge history ==
For further information on challenge results, see § Episodes below.

Ep.	Challenge	Contestant						
Ep.	Challenge	Brandon	Alexis	Brittany	Descy	Karlene	Darris	Ryan
1	Basic Assessment	Fail	Fail	Fail	Fail	Fail	2/3	Pass
2	Riding the Rails	Fail	Fail	Fail	Fail	Fail	Pass	Grad.
2	Head-to-Head Reversing	Fail	Fail	Fail	Fail	Fail	—N/a	Grad.
2	Eye of the Needle	Pass	Fail	Fail	Fail	Fail	Pass	Grad.
3	Limo Figure-Eight Challenge	Fail	Fail	Pass	Pass	Fail	Pass	Grad.
3	The Trough	Fail	Pass	Fail	Fail	Fail	Pass	Grad.
3	The Shoulder Check Challenge	Fail	Fail	Fail	Fail	Fail	Pass	Grad.
4	Distracted Driving	Fail	Pass	Fail	Pass	—N/a	Fail	Grad.
4	Swerve and Avoid	Pass	Fail	Fail	Pass	Fail	Pass	Grad.
5	Canada's Worst Parking Lot	Fail	Fail	Fail	Pass	Pass	Grad.	Grad.
5	Trailer Reversing	Fail	Fail	Pass	Pass	Pass	Grad.	Grad.
5	Reverse Flick	Fail	Pass	Fail	Fail	Fail	Grad.	Grad.
6	The Teeter-Totter	Fail	Pass	Fail	Fail	Fail	Grad.	Grad.
6	Forward Handbrake J-Turn	Fail	Fail	Fail	Pass	Fail	Grad.	Grad.
6	Water Tank Challenge	75 L	115 L	50 L	40 L	75 L	Grad.	Grad.
7	Know Your Limits Slalom Challenge	Fail	Pass	Fail	Pass	Grad.	Grad.	Grad.
7	The Cross Challenge	Fail	Fail	Fail	Fail	Grad.	Grad.	Grad.
7	Icy Corner	Fail	Pass	Fail	Pass	Grad.	Grad.	Grad.
8	The Forward and Reverse Slalom	Pass	Pass	Pass	Grad.	Grad.	Grad.	Grad.
8	Mega Challenge	1/3	2/3	2/3	Grad.	Grad.	Grad.	Grad.

== Episodes ==
Canada's Worst Driver 14 episodes
No. in season	Title	Original release date
1	"Start Your Engines!"	October 29, 2018
Seven contestants make their way from Niagara Falls, Ontario to the Driver Rehabilitation Centre at Dunnville Airport via GPS. Except for Ryan and Darris, who both drove perfectly, most of the other drivers make a large number of moving violations on the way to rehab. Karlene arrives last as her GPS was mistakenly set to the Toronto Pearson International Airport. In a brand-new Ford Mustang GT, contestants complete all three segments of the Basic Assessment: reversing through a narrow path, navigating a corral of concrete barriers, and zigzagging past obstacles in a slalom. Ryan passes all segments of the challenge without a single hit; Darris only passes two segments (having hit the concrete corral twice). The remaining five drivers all fail the challenge, with Brandon accelerating up to over 90 km/h (56 mph) in the slalom segment after hitting the last three foam people and skidding off the course. Due to the exceptionally awful performances by most of the drivers, Shyamala suggests graduating Ryan immediately so as to give the remaining contestants their full attention, citing Ryan's flawless driving both to rehab and in the assessment challenge (along with the fact that in between his audition video and promo footage, Ryan had given up driving with his cellphone). Ryan is the panel's unanimous choice to graduate in the first episode.
2	"Look Where You Wanna Go"	November 5, 2018
The first real challenge of the season, Riding the Rails, requires driving a Suzuki Sidekick along a set of rails and then reversing the car along the same rails back to where they started. Falling off the rails and getting stuck will lead to an instant fail. Darris passes the challenge with ease. Alexis, Descy, Brittany, and Brandon don't have much trouble getting across going forwards, but fail at reversing due to not adjusting their side-view mirrors. Karlene falls off before even getting a full length of the vehicle onto the rails. Next, contestants compete in the Head-to-Head Reversing challenge, in which pairs of drivers reverse one Ford Crown Victoria each down a lane, turn around in a circular area and then reverse back up the lane they started in. Before the challenge starts, Tim gives each driver a lesson in reversing. All contestants end up hitting obstacles, leading to a failure. Since Darris passed the assessment challenge's reversing segment in the previous episode, he is exempt from this challenge; instead, Tim takes Darris on a public drive through Hamilton. Contestants then have to drive the Mustang at 70 km/h (43 mph) through a course of five foam arches. Karlene smashes the last three arches, the high speed causing a panic attack that took six minutes to subside. Alexis and Descy both speed up past 90 km/h (56 mph) and crash into arches – Alexis hits every other arch, Descy only hits the last one. Brittany smashes the last two arches, knocking out the vehicle's passenger side headlight. Brandon and Darris both complete the challenge successfully, but the stress of the challenge causes Brandon to suffer a panic attack. In deliberation, Darris is the only driver who wants to graduate, but the experts all agree it would be a disservice if Darris graduated; citing his history of violence and road rage and the fact he has an assault charge pending at home convinces them that, as superior as his technical skills, they would be of absolutely no help if he got into an accident through road rage. At what would have been the graduation ceremony, Andrew bluntly informs Darris that, despite performing the best this episode, his road rage prevented him from graduating.
3	"Check. Check."	November 12, 2018
To teach contestants proper mirror usage and further illustrate the concept of front-end swing, the drivers are each placed at the wheel of a 1990 Buick Estate station wagon in the Limo Figure-Eight Challenge. Tasked with reversing the vehicle around a figure-eight course with an emphasis on driving accuracy rather than speed, Descy, Darris, and Brittany all finish the course without any hits. Alexis and Karlene both finish the course with several hits. While completing the challenge, Brandon loses his nerve and falls apart. In The Trough, designed to test the drivers' knowledge of where their wheels are, they each have 30 minutes to take as many attempts as needed to drive the Suzuki Sidekick, equipped with a bird's-eye view camera screen as part of the season's "Evolution of Driving" theme, through a short course made up of concrete barriers placed on their side, without letting the wheels touch the ground between the barriers. Alexis and Darris both pass the course; Brandon, Descy, Brittany, and Karlene all fail the challenge, mainly by not turning wide enough. In the final challenge, the Shoulder-Check Challenge, the speed control and shoulder-checking ability of each driver is tested by requiring them to drive the Ford Mustang up a straightaway at 70 km/h (43 mph), check over both shoulders then turn into the indicated lane at the end of the straight. Alexis, Brandon, Descy, Brittany, and Karlene all fail by hitting the lane markers, with Brandon speeding up to 90 km/h (56 mph) and Karlene slowing down to 25 km/h (16 mph). Darris passes the challenge with no difficulty. In deliberation, for the second week in a row, Darris is the only driver who wants to graduate, being the only one to pass every challenge thus far, but once again, Jen's fears that Darris' road rage will return if he graduates and goes home. Despite performing the best this episode, Darris did not graduate.
4	"Crash. Bang. Boom."	November 19, 2018
Distracted Driving: Prior to the challenge, a montage of contestants from previous seasons attempting this challenge are shown, with many promising afterwards never to drive distracted again and since nearly all the drivers in rehab are guilty of being distracted at the wheel on a regular basis (every driver except Karlene uses their cellphone while driving; Karlene is the only one who consistently refuses to be distracted at the wheel-- having been hit by a car while walking in 2005-- and, as such, is exempted from this challenge), the remaining drivers are each asked to drive a simple course at 30 km/h in a BMW 7 Series (E65) while undertaking the task that causes them to be distracted. Brittany causes a lot of damage to the course while eating a hamburger patty, opening a bottle of Gatorade and grabbing a cigarette. As if that's not enough, while waiting for a text from Andrew, Brittany receives a phone call, further missing the point of this challenge. Since attempting this challenge is impossible for Brandon due to his broken arm, Sarah is forced to attempt this challenge and causes even more damage just by combing her hair and attempting to respond to a text from Andrew, but while Sarah gets the point of this challenge, that texting while driving is not worth risking her life, Brandon continues to miss the point. Darris not only causes even more damage while trying to smoke a cigarette and open a bottle of Gatorade, but he also ends up missing the point, laughing throughout the challenge. Alexis causes even more damage while trying to change her clothes and shoes, but afterwards promises her entire hometown that she will change her ways. Descy also causes even more damage while smoking, but like Alexis before her, also promises to change her ways, breaking down in tears.; Highway Drive/Mustang Challenge: Swerve and Avoid: Tim will be taking the drivers through a drive on the Chedoke Expressway before they swerve and avoid, in an attempt to demonstrate that the experience needn't be stressful. For what is considered to be perhaps the show's most important lesson, the drivers have to approach a wall of foam blocks at 70 km/h, watch for a triceratops in high heels that will emerge from one side of the wall and then swerve the car into the lane on the other side of the wall, without hitting the brakes. Brandon is up first and, despite his initial thought that he would fail due to driving with a broken arm, passes with no trouble. Karlene, who had a full-blown panic attack after both the Eye of the Needle and the Shoulder Check Challenge, is instructed not to stop; despite failing by hitting the final lane marker, she didn't break down in tears. Descy is next and for her run, rain suddenly descends on the course; despite this, she also passes with no trouble, even though she drove slightly too fast. Brittany has the worst run thus far, shutting her eyes while driving straight through the right side of the wall and smashing several lane markers. Alexis proves even worse than Brittany (if that's even possible), speeding past 90 km/h and smashing the second line of lane markers. Darris is the final driver to take the challenge and passes with no trouble.; Best Performer: Brandon, Descy and Darris were the only three people who passed this challenge, with Darris doing slightly better.; Worst Performer: Even though Brittany drove straight through the right side of the wall and smashing several lane markers, Alexis was the worst, speeding past 90 km/h and smashing the second line of lane markers.; While the experts consider Darris to be the season's best performer overall for being the only driver who passed every single challenge, Cam suggests that, since Darris' only problem is his road rage on public roads, they'll offer Darris another public drive and if he can successfully complete it, he'll be allowed to graduate; otherwise, for the third episode in a row, no one will graduate. Before the drive begins, Darris apologizes to Tim for his previous comment about disliking him and for the lack of driver commentary in the earlier public drive. The drive in question subsequently goes with no issues and, even though Darris is the only person who expresses any wish to graduate and vows never to be distracted at the wheel again, the experts are split on how Darris should leave rehab; Cam and Shyamala are in favour of simply releasing Darris for showing no desire to change his personality, while Philippe feels that they should focus on the others (something Shyamala suggested in the first episode), which Andrew agrees with, although Andrew disagrees with Cam that they're wasting their time with Darris, leaving Tim to cast the deciding vote. At the graduation ceremony, Andrew announces that Darris, who only narrowly missed graduating in the first episode on the grounds that Ryan drove flawlessly on the Assessment Challenge, is only the season's second graduate.
5	"Back It Up!"	November 26, 2018
Canada's Worst Parking Lot: After receiving a lesson on parallel parking with help from a self-parking car, the five nominees' next challenge is to park in a simulated parking lot. Each driver must reverse into a parking lot stall in one motion; if they fail to do so or commit any ticketable offense (such as hitting a car or parking in a disabled parking spot), they must perform a penalty lap. Descy, who already knows how to park properly, easily reverses into a stall and is the first to finish. After Andrew gives Karlene her disabled parking permit (due to her accident 13 years ago), she manages to park in the disabled spot after a slow two minutes of reversing and is excited to finally pass a challenge out of the ten she has attempted so far. The other three contestants, however, struggle as most of them hit objects, with the worst offense being Brittany parking in the disabled spot (prior to Karlene legally parking in it) and hitting the disabled parking sign behind the space, requiring her to perform two penalty laps. After a reminder lesson from Andrew, Brittany manages to become the third nominee to park, although it is not counted as a pass as she had to do five penalty laps. After continuing to struggle, Brandon (the only male nominee remaining in rehab after Darris graduated last episode) eventually parks, but only after doing three penalty laps. This makes Alexis the worst of the worst, as she eventually parks, but not before doing six penalty laps.; Fastest Performer: Descy was the fastest to park, due to her previous knowledge of parking properly.; Slowest Performer: Alexis was the slowest.; Trailer Reversing: Due to confusion from nominees in the past about how to reverse a trailer (stemming from the fact that you must steer the wheel in the opposite direction to where you want the trailer to turn), this season allows the nominees a chance to use a special trailer reverse knob on a Ford 4x4 that is also equipped with a reversing camera. The challenge this year involves having to reverse the trailer through three gates and into the garage, with the choice of using the reverse knob or not. Alexis is up first and decides not to use the feature; she immediately sets the bar low by continually jackknifing, hitting the obstacles and even getting briefly trapped in a mud pit. However, Andrew is more concerned with the fact that Alexis continues to show a dismissive attitude throughout the challenge (which has been becoming a recurring problem as of late) and she finishes in 22 minutes. Both Descy and Brittany finish easily with the reversing feature in 12 minutes each and while Brandon takes 15 minutes with one hit, he also finishes easily thanks to the reversing feature. Karlene, the final nominee to take the challenge, decides not to use the reversing feature and while she takes the longest of the five (33 minutes), she manages to finish without hitting things, even though she gets annoyed when Darrell tells her to stop in the garage (the only thing he told her to do in rehab so far).; Best Performer: Descy and Brittany, who had the fastest time and didn't hit anything.; Worst Performer: Even though Karlene took the longest to reverse the trailer, Alexis had a careless attitude, along with jackknifing and hitting more things than anyone else.; Crown Victoria Challenge: Reverse Flick: Unlike previous seasons, the challenge will not be using the Mustang due to it having a computer chip that stops it from going faster than 30 km/h in reverse, so instead, the show's decommissioned cop car is used for the challenge in order to teach the nominees about weight distribution in a vehicle. Brittany is up first, but all five of her runs end in failure: the first ends with her hitting the entrance barrier before entering the turnaround section, the next three attempts go slow with her hitting the barriers and her final attempt has her hit the barrier due to front end swing. Alexis, who showed no interest in Philippe's earlier lesson and only did two practice attempts, fails her first four attempts by turning too late, but manages to pass on her final attempt, preventing this challenge from having a 100% failure rate. Brandon's first two attempts end up poorly as he hits entrance barriers, his third attempt has him go slow at 20 km/h and his final two attempts are carbon copies of his first two attempts. Afterwards, he has a meltdown and kicks the barriers in anger. For Karlene, she requests to do the challenge before 8:00pm as she has to take medication that prohibits her from driving afterwards, but her first two attempts are similar to Brandon's as she hits the front entrance barriers. Despite the crew clearing the area and not resetting the course for her three remaining runs, Karlene steers too early on her third attempt, too late on her fourth attempt and her fifth attempt has her hitting the front barrier again. Despite Descy getting close on her first two attempts, she fails to capitalize on her final three runs by turning too late, much to both her and Andrew's dismay.; Best Performer: Alexis, who had the only pass. Descy came close to passing, but eventually failed.; Worst Performer: Brandon, who never once came close to passing, then suffered a meltdown.; When meeting with the experts, Brittany's crash history is brought up (she says she has hit at most 50 cars, while crew members who are asked admit to hitting no more than two cars), along with her tendency to pay for damages out of pocket instead of informing her insurance company. Brittany admits that in order to afford those payments, she usually takes overtime shifts at her job and tearfully admits that it is starting to take a toll on her, as she has no healthy outlet outside of work. For the fourth time this season, nobody expresses interest in graduating and while Andrew is shocked that nobody has once believed that they were ready for graduation (aside from Ryan and Darris, both of whom have graduated), the panel honours their request and, as per tradition, nobody graduates in the fifth episode.
6	"Ups and Downs"	December 3, 2018
The Teeter-Totter: In a semi-annual challenge, drivers will have 15 minutes to balance a semi-automatic car perfectly on a teeter-totter using proper pedal control. Prior to the challenge, Brandon is examined by a doctor, who informs him he possibly has bipolar disorder given his unstable emotional outbursts. He fails after coming close several times and ends up breaking the horn after pounding on it in frustration. Brittany fails due to her insistence on using both her feet, causing her to hit both pedals simultaneously. Descy drives without her boots on, but does not pass either. Karlene is unable to do the challenge due to her medical issues, so Alexis is the final driver and manages to pass after encouragement to use her brakes.; Best Performer: Alexis, who had the only pass after using the brakes.; Worst Performer: Brittany and Descy, who once never came close to passing and Brittany using two feet instead of just one.; Mustang Challenge: Forward Handbrake J-Turn: After learning this extreme stunt-driving manoeuvre from Philippe (with Andrew again reminding viewers that being caught performing it on public roads will lead to an immediate license suspension), each driver is given five attempts to swing the car inside a box around a foam figure with the face of their nominator. Brandon fails all five runs due to continually hitting the foot brake while fixating on the back wall. Brittany ends up having the worst run so far, in which she fails her first three runs by also hitting the foot brake, then hits the foam figure, similar to that of Canada's Worst Driver 8 co-"winner" Flora Wang (with Andrew deeming Flora's performance as one of the worst-ever challenge performances he has ever seen on the show), on her fourth before failing her final attempt by hitting the brake again (then running over the headlight of the Mustang for good measure). Before her run, Tim takes Karlene on a public road lesson and she finally manages to drive on and off the highway by herself several times without issue. Although she fails the handbrake challenge proper, she considers it a personal pass. Descy fails her first two attempts, but finally manages to pass on her third. Alexis fails all five attempts.; Best Performer: Descy, who had the only pass.; Worst Performer: Brittany, who failed miserably, hitting the foam figure.; Water-Tank Challenge: In this yearly fan-favourite challenge, the contestants have to drive a Lexus ES designed with dinosaur fossils on it through a course, with smooth acceleration, braking, and steering being critical to keeping the drivers (and their nominators) from being soaked by a water tank filled with 200 litres (53 US gal) mounted on top of the vehicle. Andrew notes that this challenge is not only designed to test pedal control, but also how the drivers handle extreme situations. Alexis' poor pedal control and reckless use of the gas causes her to scrape the foam off the car and lose 115 litres (30 US gal) of water. Brittany starts off well on the initial straightaway, but quickly loses focus during the precision steering section; however, she only loses 50 litres (13 US gal). Descy once again drives barefoot, though is the best performer of the day, losing only 40 litres (11 US gal). During Karlene's run, she begins to argue with Andrew after failing to reach 60 km/h on the straightaway, then continues arguing throughout the rest of the challenge, ultimately losing 75 litres (20 US gal) and even angrily stating that she wants to leave and go home. Despite Alexis losing the most water with 115 litres (30 US gal), Karlene has the worst run of the day, mainly due to her lackadaisical attitude and arguing with Andrew. During his run, Brandon attempts to quit after the initial straightaway, but Andrew refuses to let him and he ultimately completes the challenge with only 75 litres (20 US gal) lost.; Best Performer: Descy, who lost the least water, thanks mainly to driving barefoot.; Worst Performer: Despite Alexis losing the most water and Brandon threatening to quit, Karlene's run was deemed the worst, made even worse when she argued with Andrew, yelled obscenities at him and had the most careless attitude.; With no one else desiring to graduate, Karlene is shortlisted on the basis of her improvement in challenges and her ability to now drive on the highway alone; however, the experts call her desire to actually continue driving into question. Karlene requests one more lesson with Tim to ensure that she is ready. After a discussion which also includes Darrell agreeing to said drive, Karlene technically graduates, intending on receiving the final lesson with Tim before leaving. However, she ultimately ends up refusing it, confessing she is worried she will return to her old ways at home. She later wrote to the show, saying that not only was she unable to drive after returning home, but she had to receive counseling due to her negative experiences while on the program. She described being on Canada's Worst Driver as "one of the worst experiences I ever had."
7	"Slippery When Wet"	December 10, 2018
At the beginning of the episode, Andrew reveals that a fan by the name of Will Vanda sent him a letter thanking the show for teaching him the Swerve and Avoid technique, as it saved him from a fatal accident. In response, Andrew invited Will to the rehab centre so he himself, the panel and the production crew could all hear it and thank him in person.: Know Your Limits Slalom Challenge: In a test of how well the nominees know their own limits, they will be driving through a slalom course that is 40 m (130 ft) long between at 70 km/h in the show's vintage Cadillac Coupe de Ville. Brandon is up first and while he passes the initial distance, his request to shrink the distance to 20 m (66 ft) each ends up in failure as he loses control after the second swerve and crashes into the side barriers. Descy also passes the initial distance and, despite Drew's concern about her request to reduce the distance 25 m (82 ft) (as her overconfidence has caused accidents in the past), she manages to pass the challenge. Alexis asks to reduce it to 30 m (98 ft) and while she passes, she requests that she be in the finals in order to prove she has improved a lot since entering rehab. Brittany is the final person up, but fails the initial distance due to target fixation on the final foam figure; she also fails her request to do the course at 30 m (98 ft) by hitting two foam people. After this, Brittany makes the promise that if she is named the worst, she will give up driving permanently.; Best Performer: Descy, who has the most shrinkage in distance by 15 meters. Alexis also passed, by reducing the distance by 10 meters.; Worst Performer: Brittany, who hit the foam figure going on the initial distance and when reducing it. Brandon also set it shrunk the distance at 20 meters and hit a barrier, going off the road.; The Cross Challenge: As Andrew believes the nominees should know how to drive a vehicle in tight situations without hitting anything by this stage of the season, the Cross Challenge will test how they back up a 2005 Jeep Grand Cherokee into four spots while also performing S-turns. Additionally, they have access to a birds-eye view camera to help them during the challenge. Descy is up first, but her impatience causes her to hit the Jeep seven times in 12:15. Brandon fails to set his mirrors properly before starting and hits multiple barriers until he does so. However, Brandon does not set his mirrors correctly and he damages the Jeep repeatedly, finishing with 19 hits in 15:55. Once again, Alexis is careless throughout the challenge and gets annoyed when Andrew tells her to show some care. Brittany is the final person up where she continually hits the barriers, finishing with 14 hits in 12:35.; Fastest Performer: Despite hitting only seven things, Descy performed the fastest at 12:15, 20 seconds faster than Brittany.; Slowest Performer: Brandon performed the slowest at 15:55.; Mustang Challenge: Icy Corner: In what has been known to be the most important skill for the drivers to learn, the nominees have to drive 50 km/h around a simulated icy corner by turning left after braking on the skid and making it through the opening. To drive home the point further, the show has disabled the Mustang's ABS feature (although Cam states that even with ABS, this challenge is needed to show how much control is required to execute the manoeuvre). Brittany is up first, but speeds on her first two attempts up to 60 km/h before hitting the wall due to target fixation and her third attempt sees her hitting the wall due to oversteering (causing the wheels to take longer to grip the surface) on her three remaining attempts before understeering on her fifth and final run, despite getting a reminder lesson. Afterwards, Andrew shows her how the ABS works and Brittany asks to be in the final three, as she wants to show her family that she can drive safely. For Descy, this challenge is paramount as she nearly died from an icy corner-related accident. While she fails her first attempt due to speeding to 60 km/h like Brittany before her, she manages to pass the challenge on her second. Like Brittany and Descy before her, Alexis fails her first attempt due to target fixation, but while she performs the manoeuvre perfectly on her second attempt, she does so at 48 km/h and is forced to make another attempt at speed, which ends with her hitting the wall again before deciding to quit her remaining attempts. Brandon fails all five attempts due to fixating on the wall, causing him to request to be in the finals and make the same promise Brittany made after the Know Your Limits Slalom Challenge-- to quit driving if he is named Canada's Worst Driver.; Best Performer: Descy and Alexis were the only two people who passed this challenge, but with Descy doing slightly better.; Worst Performer: Brittany and Brandon, who were both as bad as each other, but Brittany oversped on her first two tries.; When meeting with the experts, both Brandon and Brittany reaffirm their promise to quit driving if named Canada's Worst Driver. While Brittany plans to start taking the bus if she wins the title, Brandon plans to start from scratch, Alexis still remains defiant on the front of giving up driving if she were to win the title. Descy wants to graduate, even showing the panel that she recently had the word "focus" tattooed on her left hand. Despite the fact that Alexis, Brandon and Brittany have already filled up the three spots for the final episode, Andrew reveals to Descy that half the panel wanted to keep her around for the final episode, while the other half felt that she should graduate (it is unknown which experts wanted to keep Descy around for the final episode and which experts wanted to graduate her). Ultimately, Andrew, who was left with the deciding vote, opts to let Descy graduate, as she has not only shown herself to be the most improved, but he strongly believes her promise to commit to safe driving, once again ensuring that, for the tenth year in a row, there will not be an all-female finale, sending Alexis into the finale with Brandon and Brittany. Coincidentally, this makes it the first time in a Canada's Worst Driver season where every finalist was never once shortlisted as a potential graduate, even the first time when only one driver was shortlisted the entire season.
8	"The Final Three"	December 17, 2018
The Forward and Reverse Slalom: As with the past five seasons (excluding the ninth season), the drivers have to drive a Cadillac stretch limousine through a foam arch and then slalom around a set of foam pedestrians, both forward and in reverse, this time in less than 50 seconds. Alexis is first up and fails her first five attempts by erratically steering hand-over-hand and continually driving off-course. She fails her sixth attempt by hitting the arch, before passing on her seventh. Brittany does even better, not hitting anything on the forward and reverse drives before hitting the arch. She fails her next four attempts all by hitting the arch, before finally passing on her sixth attempt with just three hundredths of a second to spare. Brandon is the final driver and fails his first seven attempts after losing control and hitting things, including the arch. Sarah promises to return a hair brush she had taken from him two years earlier if he passes, which he does on his eighth attempt, marking the first time all three finalists have passed the three-in-a-car challenge. However, Brandon's temper scares off Brittany and Alexis, causing both to vow never to get in a car with him again.; Mega Challenge: In this season's version of the Mega Challenge, the finalists must manoeuvre the Mustang through an Eye of the Slalom, a precision steering section, a concrete reverse section, a reverse steering section, a reverse flick and finally the Icy Corner. Brittany is up first and nearly completes a perfect run before failing the Icy Corner, finishing with only six hits. Alexis starts off by hitting one of the arches and knocking over a rim, though she is perfect through the rest of the challenge, also finishing with only six hits. Brandon is last and is the worst, hitting the arches, knocking over the rims in the precision and reverse steering sections and failing the forward 180°, but does manage to pass the Icy Corner (the one portion of the Mega Challenge Brittany failed on), shocking Andrew (the first time in the history of Canada's Worst Driver every finalist passed at least one component of the Mega Challenge).; Fastest Performer: Brittany performed the fastest at 25:39.; Slowest Performer: Alexis performed the slowest at 32:57.; Best Performer: Alexis and Brittany were the only two people who passed this challenge with only six hits, but Brittany doing slightly better.; Worst Performer: Brandon did the worst, finishing with 19 hits despite passing the Icy Corner.; Road Test: As with all seasons of the show since the seventh season, the final Road Test has each of the three finalists driving Andrew through Hamilton, Ontario, this time by navigating a 50 km (31 mi) course in a Mustang convertible, with the beginning and ending at McMaster University. Brittany is the first to do the road test and her running driver's commentary, as well as her new knowledge of road signs and rules (due to her studying in the off-time), results in her not making a single mistake, with the experts noting it to be one of the best Road Test performances in the show's history. Afterwards, Andrew practically tells Brittany that, even without Brandon or Alexis having done their runs, her status as the final graduate is all but assured. Before Brandon's run, Andrew tells him that he doesn't have to take the drive, but Brandon remains determined to do so-- however Brandon quickly gets off to a bad start-- turning against traffic onto a one-way road (and not recognizing the sign), running through a red light and speeding in a 40 km/h zone. Brandon's offenses continue piling up, to the point where Andrew has him pull over for aggressive behaviour and halts the drive for 30 minutes. After resuming, Brandon runs two more red lights before Andrew orders him to pull over once again, telling Brandon he does not think he should drive, but Brandon insists on finishing. In the process, he makes an illegal U-turn, runs more red lights and commits his worst mistake-- fixating on the road ahead and running a stop sign, the view of which was blocked by a stopped city bus (Andrew notes that had someone been proceeding through from the cross-street, a serious T-bone accident could have occurred). Brandon finishes with 11 moving violations that would have cost him $2,100 had he been caught in stark contrast to Brittany's perfect drive, Cam rates Brandon's Road Test to be one of the worst ever. Before Alexis' drive, she finally makes the same promise Brandon and Brittany made in the previous episode-- to cut up her license if she is named Canada's Worst Driver. At first, she makes mistakes similar to Brandon's, such as not looking at signs or lights, before ultimately turning into a bus lane and making two unsafe lane changes (turning left into the MacNab Street Bus Terminal from the middle lane of King Street West and making an unsafe lane change at the intersection of Main Street East and Hughson Street South). However, Alexis finally improves once she starts using the driver's commentary and makes relatively few mistakes afterwards, finishing with only five moving violations that would have cost her $725 had she been caught.; Best Performer: Brittany, who did not commit a single moving violation and got a "gold star" from Andrew. Alexis only made five moving violations, but it was an unsuccessful run, due to her lack of knowledge about road signs and road rules.; Worst Performer: Brandon, who failed miserably, committing 11 moving violations, totaling $2,100.; In their final meeting with the experts, Brittany credits Tim for her commitment and perfect final drive. Despite a relatively good finish to an otherwise disastrous road test, Alexis admits that she might be Canada's Worst Driver due to not being as invested in the process as she should have been. Brandon is lambasted for his unstable emotions and ignorance of road rules; however, he refuses to believe he is Canada's Worst Driver. While Brandon's drive was clearly the worst, Cam argues that Alexis should be named joint-worst with Brandon, given the fact she still performed worse than others who were named the worst in the past, with Shyamala also concerned that, even if Alexis doesn't graduate, she won't make any efforts to improve as a driver after leaving rehab. At the trophy ceremony, Brittany is named the final graduate for her massive improvements and learning to focus at the wheel, with Andrew saying she had one of the greatest turnarounds in the show's history, as she was one of the most unaware and accident-prone drivers before rehab. After Brittany leaves, Andrew makes the announcement that, in the end, Brandon is Canada's Worst Driver because of his unpredictable emotions, being unable to process the lessons he was taught and his disastrous final drive. Alexis, therefore, fails to graduate and Andrew cuts up a copy of her license to drive home the point that she remains a very unsafe driver who still has much to learn, something Alexis reacts angrily to, believing that she deserved to graduate and is driven away by Gerry. In the end, Brandon cuts up his license and Andrew awards him the trophy before Sarah drives him home as not only the final person ever to be named Canada's Worst Driver, but also the last man. In the closing voice-over, Andrew reveals that Brandon has kept his promise and has not driven once in the five months since filming.

== Graduation table ==
Contestant		Episode							
No.	Name	1	2	3	4	5	6	7	8
1	Brandon	IN	IN	IN	IN	IN	IN	IN	CWD
2	Alexis	IN	IN	IN	IN	IN	IN	IN	RUNNER-UP
3	Brittany	IN	IN	IN	IN	IN	IN	IN	GRAD
4	Descy	IN	IN	IN	IN	IN	IN	GRAD	—N/a
5	Karlene	IN	IN	IN	IN	IN	GRAD	—N/a	
6	Darris	IN	IN*	IN*	GRAD	—N/a			
7	Ryan	GRAD	—N/a						

* The contestant was on the panel's shortlist.
The contestant graduated.
The contestant was the runner-up for Canada's Worst Driver.
The contestant became Canada's Worst Driver.

Episodes 2 and 3 were non-elimination weeks, due to Darris' pending assault charge and history of violence and road rage, and to Jen's fears that Darris' road rage might return if he graduates early, respectively.

Episode 5 was a non-elimination week, due to all contestants wanting to remain at the Driver Rehabilitation Centre and all contestants (except Alexis) failing the Reverse Flick.
