= Philippe Létourneau =

Philippe Létourneau is a former race car driver, a driving instructor and expert who has appeared on the reality-television show Canada's Worst Driver since 2007. Létourneau started racing at a young age. At age 11, he showed talent in the Québec karting championship. His compatriots and notably his father, Roger Blouin, a former rally champion, encouraged him to pursue the sport and pushed him into Formula racing. Létourneau finished on the podium more than 40 times in over 150 races. He competed in Formula 1600, Formula 2000, Champcar Light, Formula Renault, Formula Vauxhall Junior, Touring car, Spec Racer, Formula Atlantic and Daytona Prototypes, and competed at circuits including Silverstone, Magny Cours, Daytona Speedway, Mont Tremblant and Gilles Villeneuve. Létourneau is a high-performance driving and automobile racing instructor and is chief instructor for the Jim Russell Racing School, chief instructor for BMW Driver Training and principal instructor for the Ferrari Driving Experience. He trains driving instructors for the Québec police and other organizations. He is a critical analyst, aiding development for many car manufacturers and tire producers. In addition to his role on Canada's Worst Driver, Létourneau has been an expert in the Discovery Channel Canada program Star Racer.
