= Canada's Worst Driver 12 =

- Season 12
- No. of episodes: 8

Release
- Original network: Discovery Channel
- Original release: October 24 – December 12, 2016

Season chronology
- ← Previous; Canada's Worst Driver 11 Next → Canada's Worst Driver 13

Canada's Worst Driver 12 is the twelfth season of the Canadian reality TV show Canada's Worst Driver, which aired on the Discovery Channel. As with previous years, eight people, nominated by their family or friends, enter the Driver Rehabilitation Centre to improve their driving skills. The focus of this season was on the dangers of speeding.

This year, the Driver Rehabilitation Centre is located at the Dunnville Airport in Dunnville, Ontario for the seventh straight season. The initial drive started in Niagara Falls, Ontario and the final road test occurred in Hamilton, Ontario.

This season notably featured reckless and texting while driving contestant Krystal McCann, who not only drove in a way that was described by the show as rude, inconsiderate, selfish and unacceptable, but also became the first-ever Canada's Worst Driver "winner" to not receive the trophy due to her refusal to learn.

Reactions towards Krystal's behaviour on the show was overwhelmingly negative, due to her overall equally negative appearance, especially her rudeness noted towards host Andrew Younghusband. Following the conclusion of the season, Krystal stated in an interview with CBC News that she had been diagnosed with borderline personality disorder after filming, which she attributed as a factor for her behavior on the season.

== Experts ==
- Cam Woolley is the show's longest-serving expert, having been present in every season except the first and has seen the habits of Canadian drivers change drastically since 2000, with the most common offense having changed from DUI to distracted driving. He is the traffic expert on CP24 in Toronto and had a 25-year career as a traffic sergeant with the Ontario Provincial Police.
- Philippe Létourneau is a veteran high-speed driving instructor who counts BMW and Ferrari among his clients. Since joining the show in the third season, the average car has gained considerably in speed and acceleration, with the high-speed emphasis of this season making his job a particularly important one.
- Shyamala Kiru is the show's resident psychotherapist and relationship expert, a position which has become more demanding each year since joining the show in the seventh season, as the stresses in driving and everyday life seem to always be on the increase.
- Tim Danter is the show's head driving instructor, a position he has held since joining the show in the eighth season. In this position, he not only gives the drivers help and instructions for challenges, but gives them further lessons off-screen.

== Contestants ==
This season features eight contestants, down from the nine featured in the eleventh season:

- Mike Adrain, 44, from Renfrew, Ontario (near Ottawa), suffered a serious brain injury in a traffic accident in September 2003, when he was hit head-on by a driver who fell asleep at the wheel. While Mike's driving license was subsequently revoked in medical grounds, he was able to earn it back in recent years. However, his wife and nominator, Christian Adrain, is increasingly questioning whether Mike would have been better staying off the roads, as he has experienced many accidents in the time since he regained his license. He drives a red Dodge Ram 1500 and drove a brown Chevrolet Malibu to the rehab centre.
- Amrinder Dua, 25, from Hamilton, Ontario, originally learned to drive in his native India and managed to earn a Canadian driving license with little effort. However, his lack of familiarity with Canadian road laws has resulted in him earning several suspensions and crashing a new car that his best friend, Akash, had only bought two days prior was the final straw, leading to Akash's nominating him. He drives a silver Dodge Grand Caravan.
- Tyler Dupont, 44, from Innisfail, Alberta (near Red Deer), is by his own admission an accomplished welder but a poor driver. The stress that driving causes him, likely originating from his being badly hurt in a crash a decade prior, has resulted in him increasingly resorting to driving while under the influence of alcohol, which in turn has resulted in him committing at least 20 hit-and-run offenses over the previous year. This has caused his wife, Jana Dupont, to nominate him for the show as a last-ditch effort to get him to reform. It was revealed by Jana that Tyler also received a brain injury from a past traffic collision and that it ultimately affects his driving ability. He drives a gray Dodge Grand Caravan and drove a purple Pontiac Montana SV6 to the rehab centre.
- Daniella Florica, 30, from Kitchener, Ontario, lacks confidence when it comes to driving. She purposefully sought out a job that allowed her to work from home; this allows her to drive as little as possible. After relying on friends and family to drive her everywhere, Daniella now feels she is a liability on the road; which is her excuse for her disinterest and limited knowledge of driving. She has been known to suffer panic attacks when attempting to merge onto the highway. Her sister, Chantal Scapinello, has brought Daniella to rehab to help her gain the confidence she needs to start driving assertively. She drives a silver Ford Escape.
- Diana Hutchings, 33, from Edmonton, Alberta, is a substitute teacher who relies more on spiritual energies than the rules of the road, sometimes even burning incense and reciting mantras while at the wheel. Her brother-in-law, Joedy, is less than convinced by her approach, however, especially since she has twice had her driving license suspended for dangerous driving, leading to him nominating her in an effort to give her a wake-up call. She drives a black Honda Insight and drove a blue Toyota Yaris to the rehab centre.
- Cody Jensen, 28, from East St. Paul, Manitoba (near Winnipeg), has already had his driving license suspended five times and is just one ticket away from a sixth suspension. He attributes his reckless driving habits to the adrenaline rush that he gets from driving at extreme speeds, and is able to get away with repeatedly wrecking his vehicles thanks to his mechanical expertise, which allows him to repair even severe damage. His girlfriend, Sarah, has had enough of his reckless habits and has nominated him with the ultimatum of either making an effort to improve or ending their relationship. He drives a blue Dodge Ram 3500 and a silver Cadillac STS and drove a black Dodge Magnum to the rehab centre.
- Krystal McCann, 28, from Edmonton, Alberta, never had any formal driving education, and was able to get her driving license with her prior experience mostly consisting of joyriding with cars stolen from her neighbours, something she was doing as early as the age of 13. Despite her past, Krystal has too much over confidence in her abilities behind the wheel and her brother, Steven McCann, has nominated her in an effort to finally give her a proper education in driving. She drives a blue Jeep Renegade and drove a blue Saturn Vue to the rehab centre.
- Lou Valcourt, 41, from Winnipeg, Manitoba, only got her driving license a year ago after having a learner's permit for 15 years. She lost any desire to drive at an early age, when her best friend was killed by a speeding driver and has driven four times in her entire life. Her common-law husband, Derek Trevor Lambert, has nominated her in an effort to give her the confidence boost she needs to be an independent driver. She drives a red Ford Expedition and drove a white Toyota RAV4 to the rehab centre.

== Synopsis ==
Contestant	1	2	3	4	5	6	7	8
Krystal McCann	IN	IN	IN	IN	IN	IN	IN	CWD
Daniella Florica	IN	IN	IN	IN	IN	IN	IN	RUNNER-UP
Tyler Dupont	IN	IN	IN	IN	IN	IN	IN	OUT (Note: Since Krystal wasn't worthy of the trophy, Tyler subsequently received the trophy instead as the "Final Graduate" trophy)
Lou Valcourt	IN	IN	IN	IN	IN	IN	OUT	
Mike Adrain	IN	IN	IN	IN	IN	OUT		
Diana Hutchings	IN	IN	IN	OUT				
Amrinder Dua	IN	IN	OUT					
Cody Jensen	IN	OUT						

The contestant became Canada's Worst Driver.
The contestant was the runner-up for Canada's Worst Driver.
The contestant was on the panel's shortlist.
The contestant graduated.

== Episodes ==
No.	Title	Original release date
1	TBA	October 24, 2016
The Drive To Rehab: For the third time in five seasons, the journey to the Driver Rehabilitation Centre starts from Niagara Falls, this time from Queen Victoria Park. Tyler is first to make the journey and, even before setting off, earns a reprimand from Andrew for repeatedly driving drunk. He subsequently speeds throughout his drive and runs at least one red light. Daniella is petrified by the thought of driving on the highway, even if only for a brief duration and subsequently demands that Chantal make all the decisions during their drive, to the point of having Chantal take over for part of it. Diana spends much of her drive reading a spiritual book and looking at "positive thinking cards," leaving Joedy anxious throughout the drive. Mike proves very slow in his drive and tends to drift between lanes. Cody gets to rehab without any major issues, as does Lou, albeit she proves extremely nervous throughout. Amrinder speeds, texts and runs several stop signs during his drive. Krystal is the final driver to make the journey and Andrew reveals that, due to her dangerous driving when shooting her audition videos, the camera crew have refused to accompany her for her drive. As if that's not bad enough, it is revealed before Krystal leaves that, due to her horrible driving, her insurance premium is $10,000 per year, second only to Canada's Worst Driver 6 contestant Scott Schurink as the highest in the show's history. She subsequently commits an extreme number of moving violations during the course of her run and even goes so far as to tear up the directions that she was given at the start and throwing them at Steven, committing a total of 107 ticketable offenses before arriving in rehab by using directions from "Siri." Andrew subsequently says that, based on what he has seen so far, Krystal looks like the worst driver in the show's history.; Best Performer: Cody, for arriving safely at the shortest time (before Daniella).; Worst Performer: Krystal, who commits an extreme number of moving violations, citing Andrew to mention that the way she drove was "like the actions of a horrible person."; Mustang Challenge: Basic Assessment: After briefly teasing the viewers by suggesting that this year's recurring challenge vehicle will be a huge mobile home, Andrew reveals that it will actually be a 2016 Ford Mustang GT. As with the previous few seasons, the basic assessment requires the drivers to reverse the car through a section of wheel rims, turn it around in an area made up of concrete barriers and blocks and then perform a 50 km/h slalom around five foam people. Krystal is first-up and performs extremely poorly in the reversing section, even more so after Andrew has Steven leave her to make her own decisions. She does a little better in the remaining two segments, but still fails both due to her stress and lack of focus. Tyler does almost as poorly as Krystal in the reversing section and then badly damages the car's bumper, before trying to drive the slalom with only one hand on the wheel, predictably failing. Daniella is made to take her entire run without Chantal in the car, so that she will think for herself; her performance ends up being mostly the same as Tyler's and she also takes the slalom too slowly. Cody manages the rare feat of passing every part of this first challenge, causing Andrew to comment that his problem clearly is not one of skill, but rather his attitude. Mike performs poorly while reversing, but is able to turn the car around in the barriers just fine, only to then hit two foam people on the slalom, much to his frustration. Diana is forced to drive without any of her usual spiritual distractions, and passes the first two parts of the course with ease, only to speed on the slalom and clip one of the foam people. Despite her otherwise good performance, the thought of driving without her usual rituals causes her severe stress. Amrinder gets through the reversing section with only three hits and turns the car around without trouble, only to then speed on the slalom and hit one of the foam people head-on. Lou proves incredibly slow on the first two parts of the course and then completely loses control on the slalom after panicking and hitting the gas instead of the brakes.; Best Performer: Cody, Diana, Amrinder and Mike were the only people who passed at least one segment of this challenge, but Cody doing clearly better.; Worst Performer: Lou hit many things in both the reversing and concrete sections (while taking at least a half an hour for each section) and for spinning off the course during the slalom.; The experts have harsh words for Krystal and Tyler, due to their confrontational attitude and drunk-driving habits, respectively. Tyler admits from the start that he might be Canada's Worst Driver, but Krystal angrily denies that she is the worst and the experts are perturbed by her repeated claims that she is not really a bad driver because she has never severely injured anyone. As usual, no one graduates this episode, as it serves merely as a skills evaluation. Note: This episode did not display an opening title screen or broadcast the opening animation.
2	TBA	October 31, 2016
Riding the Rails: The first real challenge of the season tests the drivers' knowledge of their wheel position, by requiring them to drive a Suzuki Vitara across a short set of I-beam rails and then making the same journey in reverse. If the driver falls off at any point, they will fail. Cody and Amrinder both pass with ease, further cementing Andrew's opinion that they are both competent drivers who just need an attitude adjustment. Mike also passes without any real difficulty. Daniella fails by falling off near the end of her forward run. Diana comes close to passing, but goes too fast in her reverse run and drifts off the rails near the end. Krystal gets across fine going forwards despite forgetting to take the parking brake off, only to mistakenly assume that all she needs to do is hit the reverse to end up exactly where she started, causing her to fall off the rails and fail almost immediately. Lou narrowly passes the forward section, but has difficulty with her mirrors and quickly fails while reversing. Tyler falls off the rails within seconds of starting.; Best Performer: Cody, Amrinder and Mike went over the rails without any trouble.; Worst Performer: Tyler did the worst, falling off seconds within starting.; Head-to-Head Reversing: This challenge, being run in its Canada's Worst Driver 10 incarnation, pairs off two drivers reversing one Ford Crown Victoria each down a lane, turn around in a circular area and then reverse back up the lane they started in. Daniella and Lou are the first to attempt the challenge and the former repeatedly over-steers while the latter under-steers, meaning that they cause a lot of damage even before getting to the turning area. Lou proves so slow that Daniella is able to take four additional runs and while she still fails the challenge for not passing on her first attempt, she is nonetheless given credit for a clean run on her final go. Diana and Tyler go second and Diana initially insists on wearing a backpack containing books during her run, which Andrew tells her to put in the back seat (she sneaks it back onto her lap before starting). Both drivers are able to get to the turning area without hitting anything, only to then get overly competitive and treat it as an actual race, causing them both to narrowly fail (with one hit and three hits, respectively) as they rush to be the first to finish. Before Cody and Mike take the third run, Andrew brings them together for a talk, so that Mike can let Cody know first-hand what the consequences for a person injured by a dangerous driver can be, assuming they are lucky enough to survive at all. Christian also reveals that she was injured almost as severely as Mike, requiring reconstructive surgery. Cody is moved to tears by this and vows that he will never again be such a reckless driver. Unfortunately, he forgets to looks out of the back window, causing him to fail. Mike also fails to pass, but does not do too badly, with just four low-speed hits. Amrinder and Krystal are the final pair to face off and Amrinder fails by driving too quickly, resulting in two hits, but Krystal, who, for once, is forced to drive without distractions, passes despite also driving a little too fast for Steven's comfort.; Best Performer: Krystal, who does not hit anything during her run.; Worst Performer: Lou and Daniella, both taking extremely long and hitting a large number of objects, although Daniella was credited for taking multiple runs and having a clean fifth run.; Mustang Challenge: The Shoulder-Check Challenge: This annual challenge tests the speed control and shoulder-checking ability of each driver, by requiring them to drive the Mustang up a straightaway at 70 km/h, check over both shoulders to see whether a green sign is placed to their left or right and then turn into the corresponding lane at the end of the straight. Mike correctly shoulder-checks, but fails by oversteering and hitting the lane markers when getting into the right lane. Cody, Amrinder and Diana all pass, though the former two drive a little over the advised speed. Lou narrowly fails by clipping the lane divider as she turns, but is given credit for understanding the lesson and otherwise carrying out the challenge correctly. Krystal refuses Andrew's offer to be driven through the course beforehand (something every other driver accepted) and then back-talks him when he tells her to put her phone away. She subsequently takes her run far too fast (at 100 km/h), cannot carry out the shoulder-check in time and then crashes through the lane divider, badly damaging the Mustang's front bumper. Things then go from bad to worse when Andrew confronts her over her performance, only for her to reply with more back-talk and then claim that the challenge has no relevance to real life. Andrew forces her to take a second run, in which she still drives a little too fast and only checks over one shoulder and then a third run, which she finally succeeds at. Daniella, who refused to believe that there was any such thing as a blind spot until Andrew demonstrated it, gets very anxious even when Andrew drives her through the course and then freezes up and stops the car when she actually attempts the challenge. She is allowed to take a second run and turn into the lane of her choosing, but she panics, closes her eyes and then hits the dividing barrier, causing the already-damaged front bumper to break away entirely. Tyler, who also did not understand what a blind spot was, commits the common error of turning his wheel when he turned his head, causing him to fail by hitting the lane markers.; Best Performer: Cody, Amrinder and Diana, going through the correct lane without hitting anything.; Worst Performer: Daniella broke the front bumper and crashed the car through the dividing barrier.; When meeting with the experts, Krystal complains that Andrew is being unduly harsh on her, but the experts are unsympathetic and say that so far, she has proved his criticisms to be correct. Despite this, she believes that she deserves to graduate and that her only problem as a driver was not knowing how to reverse, much to the panel's disbelief. Cody also tells the panel what he has learned in the episode, and that he now fully understands what is at stake if he continues to drive recklessly. While Andrew's opinion is that Cody is just telling the panel what they want to hear, the experts feel that he has learned enough to graduate. Cody therefore becomes the season's first graduate and, before leaving, is given a Mike-shaped rear-view air freshener to remind him of what could happen if he lapses back into his speeding habits.
3	TBA	November 7, 2016
Reverse Figure-Eight: In order to educate the drivers on the concept of front-end swing and encourage them to use their mirrors, each driver is required to reverse a 1980s GMC Conversion van containing the other six drivers around a figure-eight course. Lou takes the challenge first and proves extremely nervous, finishing with a total of 15 hits. Before his run, Tyler is forced to openly admit to his drunk-driving habits, which gets a particularly disapproving reaction from the other drivers and nominators, especially Mike and Lou, due to the former's driving-related injuries and the latter's losing a friend to a dangerous driver. Tyler's actual run is not shown, though is implied by Andrew to have been not overly impressive. Diana lights an incense stick before her run, only for Krystal to angrily grab it and throw it out of the van, complaining about the smell, leading Andrew to reprimand both women. While Diana's run is not too bad, she spends too much time switching between mirrors and causes eight hits. Mike has the best run so far, with only a single hit, though Andrew and Christian remain concerned about his ability to drive in public. Daniella also does well, hitting only two things. Krystal, who had already been reprimanded for not paying attention during Andrew's demonstration, as well as her rudeness toward Diana, drives so carelessly and quickly that she bursts one of the van's tires, causing her run to be halted. Amrinder has easily the best run of the day, not stopping or hitting anything and even doing so with all the nominators in the van in addition to the drivers.; Best Performer: Amrinder did not hit anything throughout his run.; Worst Performer: Krystal punctured the tire and did not take the challenge seriously.; Road Signs: The drivers are each tested on their knowledge of common Canadian road signs. None of the drivers perform particularly well on this test, although Krystal is the worst with 2/10 right.; The Water Tank Challenge: For this year's incarnation of this signature challenge, the drivers each have to navigate a 1992 Buick Roadmaster station wagon through an obstacle course. A partially-open plexiglas tank containing 200 litres (53 US gal) of water is mounted on the roof and any less-than-smooth driving will lead to a soaking for the driver and their nominator. Even Andrew is unable to carry out the course perfectly, losing 20 litres (5.3 US gal) in his demonstration. Tyler is up first and his sharp, erratic braking leads to him losing 185 litres (49 US gal), setting the bar very low. Daniella gets off to a terrible start, crashing through the barrier at the end of the initial straight and losing a lot of water, though she does a little better in the rest of her run, losing 110 litres (29 US gal). Lou requires two attempts on the initial straight after suffering a panic attack on her first go and then has to be guided by Andrew for much of her run. While she loses less than Tyler, with 120 litres (32 US gal), she takes by far the longest to complete the challenge. Krystal ends up quitting the challenge after only driving a few car lengths, during which she still gets soaked thanks to erratic acceleration and sharp braking. Diana drives too hastily during her run, causing her to lose 150 litres (40 US gal). Mike has one of the better runs so far, losing slightly over 100 litres (26 US gal), but his slow response times still prove a major issue. Amrinder, whom Akash is unable to accompany in this challenge due to an old back injury, has a less-than-enthusiastic Tim in the car with him. Despite Amrinder committing a major blunder when he makes a wrong turn and nearly leaves the course, causing him and Tim to get soaked when he is forced to brake, he still has the best performance for the second challenge in a row, losing 80 litres (21 US gal).; Best Performer: Amrinder, for losing the least amount of water other than Andrew (80 litres (21 US gal)).; Worst Performer: Krystal, who quits.; Mustang Challenge: The Eye of the Needle: For this challenge, which has been present in every season of the show so far, the drivers each have to navigate the car at a fixed 70 km/h through five arches at staggered positions. Diana, who is forced to drive with no distractions, passes with ease. Lou spends her entire run repeating the phrase "look where you want to go" to herself, and despite her best efforts, smashes all but the first arch. Daniella gets very nervous in her run and hits two arches, breaking one of the car's headlights in the process. Amrinder takes his run much too fast, at 90 km/h, and ends up hitting all but one of the arches, ruining what Andrew points out would have been a near-certain graduation this episode. Before Tyler's run, Andrew also reveals that the track section where this challenge is attempted has been nicknamed the "Flora Turn," in reference to Canada's Worst Driver 8 co-"winner" Flora Wang, who spun off the track going sideways at 140 km/h. Tyler recounts seeing this when watching that season; unfortunately, he unwittingly proceeds to emulate Flora's run, speeding up to 120 km/h before hitting an arch, then losing control and leaving the track. After witnessing this, Andrew is left wondering whether Tyler should drive at all, even leaving aside his driving under the influence. Mike does well initially, but speeds up to 100 km/h and smashes the third arch. More concerningly, he admits being unable to remember the lesson that Philippe gave him earlier that day. Krystal gets through the arches correctly, but her run is judged to be a failure because she sped up to 110 km/h near the end.; Best Performer: Diana, who is the only contestant to go through the eye of the needle without hitting the arches while maintaining speed (although Krystal also had a clean run, she sped to 110 km/h which constituted a failure).; Worst Performer: Tyler, for going off course by losing control of the vehicle.; Tyler admits to the judges that this episode has been a wake-up call, both in terms of the other drivers' reaction to his drinking and driving (particularly Lou, who continued to remind him about her deceased friend off-camera) and realizing that he is not as good of a driver as he thinks he is. Krystal again wants to graduate, but is immediately shot down by the judges and does not help her cause by implying that nothing Tim has taught her has been of any use. Amrinder and Diana put themselves forward for graduation and the judges consider both, due to the former being the only person to pass two challenges this episode and the latter's exemplary Eye of the Needle performance. Tim and Shyamala back Amrinder to graduate for being the more technically skilled of the two and believing that Diana was still too distracted, while Andrew and Philippe back Diana, as they are unconvinced that Amrinder has reformed his speeding habits, but are satisfied that Diana has learned to drive without distractions. This leaves Cam with the deciding vote, which he casts in favour of Amrinder, who not only becomes the season's second graduate, but also wins a $20 bet with Krystal that he would graduate before her.
4	TBA	November 14, 2016
The Trough: In order to further illustrate the concept of front-end swing, this challenge requires the drivers to navigate a Suzuki Vitara through a trough made up of concrete Jersey barriers placed on their side. Each driver will have two attempts. Tyler fails his first by not taking the turns wide enough, then overcompensates and takes the turns too wide on his second. Diana also overcompensates and narrowly fails on her first attempt, but then passes with ease on her second. Mike quickly fails both attempts, after having trouble getting the car onto the course. Krystal fails her first attempt just as quickly and makes more of an effort on her second go, but still falls off about halfway down the track. Lou is the only driver who sets her mirrors without Andrew needing to prompt her to do so, but that is as good as her run gets and she quickly falls off in both her runs. Daniella nearly succeeds on her first go despite her extreme nerves, which then get the better of her and cause her to fail her second run early on.; Best Performer: Diana passed the trough from beginning to end on her second attempt.; Worst Performer: Mike had the most trouble getting the vehicle on the trough and fell off the earliest.; Distracted Driving: While only three of the drivers are felt to be habitually distracted enough to be required to take this course, Andrew notes that Diana and Krystal are quite possibly the two most distraction-prone drivers ever to appear on the show. They, along with Mike, are therefore given the task of driving a decommissioned police cruiser around a simple track, both with and without distractions. Diana takes the course first and is initially irritated at having to undertake the challenge, believing that her distractions are not a problem and that all she needs to do is drive slower in order to compensate. She soon gets a dose of reality when she crashes out of the course altogether, leading to her admitting that she often lacks confidence in herself and uses her spiritual techniques to help; Andrew tells her that there is nothing wrong with doing so, but that she absolutely cannot do them while at the wheel. Mike habitually smokes while at the wheel and quickly comes to learn how even a relatively small distraction like this can severely impact his driving ability, with even Christian vowing not to ever have any distractions at the wheel. Krystal also does not want to take the challenge, as she believes that she is a skilled enough driver that she can use her phone at the wheel without it affecting her driving. She subsequently crashes on one of the course's turns while texting Andrew, only to claim that this proves nothing, as she only texts while driving on long, straight stretches of road (despite the show having plenty of footage proving otherwise). At the end of the challenge, Krystal remains defiant, believing that she has in fact proved she can drive while distracted.; Mustang Challenge: Swerve and Avoid: For this challenge, which is often credited as the one most likely to save a driver in real-life, the drivers have to drive down a straight stretch of road at 70 km/h toward two entrances; a grey foam wall will then block one of the entrances, requiring the driver to swerve into the other entrance. Each driver has two attempts. Lou target fixated on her first attempt, driving her directly into the foam wall. On her second run, she succeeds, passing a challenge for the first time this season. Mike succeeds on his first attempt; he swerves a little erratically before correcting course, but is nonetheless given the pass. Daniella fails her first run by driving right into the foam wall and then understeers and turns far too late on her second run, hitting the wall dividing the two lanes. Diana nearly passes on her first go, but commits a fatal error by tapping the brake as she goes into the correct lane, causing her to spin out of control. Andrew tells her that she will almost certainly graduate if she passes this challenge and she does so at her second attempt. Krystal speeds up to 100 km/h in her first run and then drives straight into the foam wall, admitting afterwards that she just chose a lane at random without even looking for the barrier and trying to deny that she was driving any faster than 70 km/h. Adding insult to injury, it then turns out that the force of the crash damaged the new car's on-board computer, rendering it unable to start; after this, Krystal is barred from taking her second run. Tyler, as the last remaining driver, has to use a Ford Crown Victoria for his run and despite Andrew admonishing him not to speed, he accelerates to 83 km/h and then drives straight into the foam wall. On his second attempt, Tyler hits the brakes as he steers, causing him to lose control and crash through the central wall, leaving Andrew further unconvinced that Tyler is fit to drive at all.; Best Performer: Mike, who swerved successfully on his first attempt.; Worst Performer: Krystal, who sped to 100 km/h and damaged the Mustang, forcing Tyler to use an alternate car in his run.; Diana puts herself forward for graduation and admits that she is finally ready to give up her distracted driving. Krystal also puts herself forward yet again, but continues to claim that she is skilled enough to text and drive and when Andrew and Cam call her out on this, she storms out of the meeting with the experts, flipping off Andrew and angrily yelling obscenities at him and Cam even hints Krystal will eventually end up being the "winner." Despite Krystal's outburst, the experts decide that her actions are not worthy of expulsion and immediately come to the unanimous decision to graduate Diana for her near-flawless performance in this episode.
5	TBA	November 21, 2016
Mustang Challenge: Speed Kills: In what is not so much an actual challenge as a demonstration of the effect that even a small amount of excess speed can have, the drivers are each given the task of performing a mini Swerve-and-Avoid course in the Mustang (which has been successfully repaired after the damage Krystal caused in the previous episode), where they are asked to steer around a foam moose at 50 km/h, 60 km/h and 70 km/h. All of the drivers accomplish the task at 50 km/h, but only a couple of them do it at 60 km/h, and all of them hit the moose at 70 km/h. Krystal has difficulty performing the demonstration, driving at 70 km/h on her first run due to her poor pedal control, which requires Andrew to give her a lesson on how to properly use the accelerator. After this, she manages to carry out the demonstration correctly, but still claims that it is okay to speed in certain situations, much to Andrew's annoyance. Meanwhile, Daniella is also given a lesson in highway driving by Tim on the Lincoln M. Alexander Parkway in an attempt to calm her nerves.; The Longest Reversing Challenge in the World: This year's incarnation of this challenge has the drivers reversing a 1972 Cadillac Coupe de Ville down a 1-kilometer course made up of various different obstacles, including wheel rims, parked cars, concrete barriers and foam blocks. The drivers are told to take the course at whatever speed they feel comfortable at. Mike is first up and gets off to a poor start, due to going too quickly and not looking out the back window. He does better in the latter parts of the course, finishing with 12 hits, but admits that he'd probably be better off at home by getting rid of his truck and driving a smaller car. Krystal sets a new low for this challenge by knocking over the start sign just getting lined up for the course and then yelling insults at Andrew when he calls her out on her carelessness. After Steven has to remind her to set her mirrors, Andrew orders him out of the car for her run, in which she knocks over several wheel rims almost immediately and then starts texting while at the wheel, leading to yet another argument with Andrew. Steven has to get back in the car just so that she will actually make an effort; she subsequently speeds and hits several objects, yet rates her performance as an "A+," leaving the experts to further question her attitude. Lou takes 15 minutes (longer than it took Mike to complete the entire challenge) just to travel a single car length and still knocks wheel rims over; it eventually takes her 57 minutes to finish. Daniella is the best performer by far at this challenge, finishing in a reasonable time with just five hits, which she attributes to reversing being one of the few driving situations not to make her nervous. Tyler tries to complete the challenge by looking exclusively at his driver's-side mirror, instead of looking out the back window, causing him to hit several things. After Andrew reminds him of the correct technique, he does better for the remainder of the challenge, finishing with 11 hits.; Best Performer: Daniella, who only hit five things and also driving the fastest.; Worst Performer: Krystal, who violently went off course and for texting mid-challenge.; Forward Handbrake J-Turn: In order to perform this manoeuvre, which Andrew reminds the viewers is considered stunt driving by the authorities and can lead to a person getting a $10,000 fine and an instant driving license suspension if caught performing it on public roads, the drivers have to unbalance an early 2000s Honda Civic's steering and then use the handbrake to turn the car around 180°. The challenge itself requires the drivers to enter a confined space and use the technique to dodge around a foam person featuring the face of the driver's nominator. Each driver has five attempts. Lou fails her first attempt by hitting the foot brake instead of the handbrake, and then fails her remaining four attempts by consistently leaving it much too late to apply the handbrake. Daniella approaches the challenge with the expectation that she will fail and her fears are well-founded: she subsequently fails her first run by hitting the foot brake and then her second when Chantal's face blows off the foam person, causing her to panic and completely lose control. On her third attempt, however, she manages to pass. Krystal fails on her first run by forgetting to pull the handbrake until it is far too late, but succeeds on her second run. However, she continues to reiterate that she will still text at the wheel and drive over the speed limit (though "only" by 20 km/h), causing Andrew to tell her that if she continues with that attitude, it will guarantee her the title of Canada's Worst Driver. Mike easily passes the challenge at the first attempt. Tyler, who takes the challenge in one of Andrew's trademark striped-purple shirts (with Andrew himself wearing Tyler's shirt and impersonating Tyler), repeatedly hits the footbrake, eventually crashing into the foam Jana on his third run. He narrowly fails his fourth run, carrying out the technique correctly but clipping the foam Jana and then more severely fails his final run by under-steering and braking too late.; Best Performer: Mike, for easily passing the challenge on his first attempt.; Worst Performer: Tyler, who had an overall bad performance.; Though Daniella and Mike are noted to have been the two best performers in both of the episode's challenges, Mike says that he still does not feel ready to graduate, while Daniella's admission that she occasionally "blacks out" at the wheel instantly destroys any chance of her graduating this episode. Lou and Tyler both admit that they are nowhere near ready to graduate, while Krystal, for the first time this season, finally admits that she is a poor driver and needs a lot more help. Mike is the only person who makes the experts' shortlist, but they immediately decide to honour his wish to stay. As a result, the episode ends—as usual for the fifth episode of a Canada's Worst Driver season—with no one graduating.
6	TBA	November 28, 2016
Know Your Speed: For this year, this challenge has been extensively overhauled, with the challenge now requiring the drivers to drive a mobile home down a long straight course, with a target speed of 30 km/h in the first section, 50 km/h in the second and 70 km/h in the third section. The speedometer will be blacked out, however, forcing the drivers to use their judgement in finding the correct speed. Krystal is supposed to be first-up, but gets into an argument with Steven over her continued insistence on using her phone while at the wheel and then when Andrew tells her that she was making a fuss over nothing, she storms off and refuses to attempt the challenge. Tyler's run proves much less dramatic, but he still drives well over the target speeds, going 15 km/h too fast in the first section and 20 km/h too fast in the second and third sections. Daniella goes 10 km/h too fast in the first section, despite her fears of driving at speed, but is on-target in the second section and actually 10 km/h too slow in the third section. Mike is even more over-cautious, going around 10 km/h too slow in all three sections. Lou is the slowest of all, however, by 10 km/h in the first section and 20 km/h in the second and third. Krystal, after making an implied threat to quit the show unless Andrew apologizes for what she claims to be overly vindictive behaviour towards her, finally relents and undertakes the challenge; when she does so, she speeds far more even than Tyler did, going double the speed limit in the first section, 40 km/h too fast in the second and 30 km/h too fast in the third.; Trailer Parking Challenge: After Tim gives each driver a lesson in how to properly reverse a trailer—with Andrew noting that a lesson was not originally scheduled, as the experts felt this was something the drivers should be able to do without needing a lesson, but one was added to the schedule anyway after Tyler requested one—they have to use the 1980s GMC Conversion van to reverse a trailer down a straight track and then back it into a garage that is on a right-angle to the track. Tyler is the first to attempt the challenge which, in a change of form, he passes flawlessly at the first time of asking. During his run, Jana reveals that Tyler actually has a brain injury himself, after he was involved in a crash that sent a metal pole into his skull. Despite a frustrating experience during Tim's lesson, Daniella also succeeds on her first attempt, after looking up online tutorials on how to reverse a trailer. Mike also passes without difficulty, despite initial worries. Lou, however, does not fare nearly so well and a combination of her forgetting the lesson and Derek's poor advice sees her take well over a half-hour to finish the challenge, a performance not considered worthy of a pass. Krystal is the only driver who fails to finish, as she tries to take a shortcut by driving onto the field in front of the garage so that she can reverse the trailer straight into it, which causes the van to get stuck in the mud.; Best Performer: Mike, Tyler and Daniella for easily parking the trailer on their first attempt.; Worst Performer: Krystal, for going off course and getting stuck in the mud.; Mustang Challenge: The Icy Corner: In what is considered one of the most critical challenges taught on the show, the drivers are given a lesson in how to correctly navigate around an icy corner and then have to get the Mustang through a simulated icy corner. Each driver will have five attempts. Tyler is up first and surprises Andrew by revealing that he disabled the anti-lock braking system on his car at home (despite the increased chance of an accident) because he did not like the jerky feeling on the brakes, causing Tim to point out that this proves Tyler has a habit of braking too harshly. Tyler subsequently fails his first two runs by forgetting to release the brake, his third and fourth by over-steering and his final run by speeding. Daniella badly over-steers on all five runs and also releases the brake too late on most of her attempts, causing her to fail. Lou's scheduled five attempts are not shown, but they all end in failure (implied to be the result of taking the corner too tight), causing Andrew to allow her an extra run in which he walks her through each of the steps required, after which she succeeds. Mike, in stark contrast to the episode's first challenge, drives far too fast on his first run and is left with no time to carry out the manoeuvre. He fails his next three attempts by staring at the wall and under-steering and his final attempt by pumping the brakes. Krystal fails her first two runs by speeding and pumping the brakes and then the next two by steering erratically. Determined to see at least one person pass, Andrew gets in the car with Krystal, and while her final run is the best of the day, it still narrowly ends in failure when she momentarily steers in the wrong direction near the end of the corner, sending her into the wall. This leaves Andrew frustrated that everyone failed the challenge and even more so that Krystal was so near, yet so far from passing.; Best Performer: Krystal, who was the closest to passing the icy corner.; Worst Performer: Mike, mainly because he stared at the wall and hit the wall the most of all contestants.; While the experts consider Daniella to be the overall best performer in this episode and praise her for researching how to properly reverse a trailer on her own time, she admits that she still finds highway driving an immensely stressful experience and is not yet ready to graduate. Mike also does not want to graduate despite having done reasonably well so far, but is confident that he is not Canada's Worst Driver. Krystal does not believe she is Canada's Worst Driver and claims that Tyler is the worst of the group, something that Tyler himself actually admits might be the case. For the second episode in a row, Mike is the only person to be shortlisted. Despite his wish to stay in rehab, the lack of any other feasible graduate and Tim's positive feedback about his performance in the highway drives between challenges sees Mike become the next graduate.
7	TBA	December 5, 2016
Before the episode begins, Andrew hosts a short skit commemorating this being the show's 100th episode (assuming the Canada's Worst Drivers vs. the World, 147 Driving Don'ts, Why Accidents Happen: 101 Problems on Canadian Roads and Canada's Worst Driver: U Asked! specials are counted).: The Cross: After showing lessons that the drivers have been getting (including parallel parking, three-point turns and S-turns), the drivers have to put these techniques to the test in this challenge, by turning a 1999 Volvo V70 a full 360° in a tight, cross-shaped space formed by concrete barriers and blocks, with a further challenge added by the car being a European right-hand drive model. Daniella is unnerved by this right-hand drive car and the resulting stress causes her to perform poorly, hitting the car 22 times during the challenge. Krystal ejects Steven from the car early in her run rather than handle his criticisms and finishes with only 13 hits, but Andrew notes that she could have done a lot better if she did not have such a cavalier attitude toward driving. While Tyler (the only male nominee remaining after Mike graduated last episode) finishes with 15 hits, Andrew judges his performance to be even worse than both Krystal's and Daniella's (considering Krystal finished with only 13 hits and Daniella finished with 22 hits), as all 15 hits were with much more force and he did more damage to the car than Krystal did with her 13 and Daniella did with her 22. While Lou is the only one of the drivers who correctly plans how to do the challenge (by using S-turns), she has difficulty actually doing so and finishes with 20 hits, while taking longer to finish than the other three drivers combined; while Andrew notes that her performance left a lot to be desired, he still considers her the safest of the remaining drivers and the one most likely to graduate this episode.; Best Performer: Lou; although she took the longest to complete the challenge, at least she planned out the challenge with a safer attitude.; Worst Performer: Tyler, whose hits caused the greatest impact to the vehicle (in spite of hitting less than Lou and Daniella).; Mustang Challenge: Reverse Flick: After Andrew reiterates the harsh penalties that a person would face for actually carrying out this trick while on the road (though adding that such techniques are an effective tool when done in safe conditions), the drivers each get a lesson from Philippe in how to unbalance the car's steering and then spin it around 180°. They then have to spin the Mustang around in a confined space, with each driver getting five attempts. Daniella is first-up and, on her first attempt, she panics and stops before ever reaching the turning area. On her second turn, she crashes into the barrier leading into the turning area, but on her third attempt, she manages to pass, earning only her second challenge pass for the season. Krystal, accompanied by Andrew in her run after she and Steven had a physical altercation between challenges, passes on her first go, despite steering a little erratically while reversing, leaving Andrew more than a little concerned that Krystal might very well end up being the only viable graduate this episode. Tyler nearly passes on his first attempt, spinning the car around without hitting anything, but pushing the footbrake in the process. He is therefore made to carry out a second run, which he passes. Lou's first run ends in disaster, as she takes the turn too slowly and then panics and mistakenly hits the gas instead of the brake. She then fails her second run by hitting the entry lane barrier, but just barely passes on her third run, making this a rare challenge with a 100% success rate.; Best Performer: Krystal, who passes on her first attempt.; Worst Performer: Lou, although she also passed the challenge, was positioned closest to the wall when doing so.; The Teeter-Totter: For this challenge this season, the drivers are placed at the wheel of an automatic transmission car (not manual-transmission as in previous seasons) and tasked with driving it onto and balancing a teeter-totter. Each driver will get ten minutes in which to complete the challenge and if they fail, they have to admit to one accident they've caused at the wheel. Daniella is once again first-up and, this time, fails the challenge; her story is that she once wrecked her husband's brand new snow blower after mistakenly hitting the gas instead of the brake. Lou nearly balances the teeter-totter right at the start and, to her own surprise, manages to position the car exactly right just a few moments later, further cementing Andrew's belief that she will be this episode's graduate. Tyler also nearly passes out of the gate, but unlike Lou, he lacks the finesse to balance the teeter-totter and ends up failing; afterwards, he admits to accidentally damaging another car's front bumper while reversing in a parking lot and then driving away without leaving his details. Krystal (accompanied by Andrew again) just barely succeeds within the allotted time limit; Andrew makes her admit to causing an accident anyway and she gives a similar story to Tyler, only in her case, she hit the other car's bumper with enough force to cause it to break away entirely. On the way back to the studio, Krystal casually mentions to Andrew that she accidentally hit-and-run her own mother's car, only for Andrew to point out that the cameras were still rolling and force her to apologize on-air.; Best Performer: Lou, who balanced the teeter totter the quickest.; Worst Performer: Daniella, who was the furthest from balancing the teeter totter.; Know Your Limits: In a test of the drivers' perception of their own level of driving skill, the drivers are each placed at the wheel of what Andrew calls a 1977 Town & Country station wagon (actually a 1969 Buick Sport Wagon) and will perform an 80 km/h slalom around foam figures spaced 35 m (115 ft) apart, after which they perform a second run with the figures moved closer together by a distance of their own choosing. Just to add to the challenge, the station wagon's speedometer displays in miles per hour, forcing them to work out and remember the correct speed (50 mph) they need to drive at. For the fourth challenge in a row, Daniella is up first, but her under-steering causes her to hit two figures and Andrew is left concerned that she cannot recall anything about her run afterwards. She actually asks for the course to be widened (with the figures 45 m (148 ft) apart) for her second run and nearly passes, but fails after staring at the last foam person and driving straight into it. Tyler avoids hitting anything on his first run, though drives too slowly and brakes at one point. Tyler thinks he can still pass with the gaps shortened to 30 m (98 ft) and, to Andrew's and Jana's surprise, actually succeeds in doing so. Lou passes her first run with ease, but declines to take a second run, feeling that she would not pass with a shorter gap, which the expert panel commends her for. Krystal (now accompanied by Steven again) succeeds in her first run, but insists on an ambitious reduction of the gaps to 25 m (82 ft) for her second run and, on her way back to the starting point, earns both Andrew's and Cam's ire by texting at the wheel while driving past crew members resetting the course. Krystal sarcastically apologizes, which only makes Andrew even angrier and Steven even more unconvinced that Krystal is ever going to reform, causing him to get kicked out of the car yet again. When she finally takes her run, Krystal speeds and the unrealistically short distance between the figures causes her to spin violently off the track.; Best Performer: Tyler, for completing the slalom at the tightest gap, without hitting the foam figures.; Worst Performer: Krystal, for having the most ambitious goal of the tightest gap, for backtalking Andrew after being confronted for texting during the "resetting" of the course and for steering violently out of control.; When Krystal meets the experts, they tell her that had she not displayed such a blatantly poor attitude in the last challenge, she would almost certainly have been shortlisted to graduate this week. In response, Krystal blames Andrew, accusing him of being unhelpful and overly negative. Daniella declines to graduate, feeling that she needs to take part in the final road test to fully prove herself, but both Lou and Tyler feel that they have learned enough to graduate. Lou and Tyler are both shortlisted. Tim and Shyamala back Lou, feeling that she has the best attitude of the remaining drivers and the safest approach toward driving, while Philippe and Cam back Tyler for an overall better performance in this episode, leaving Andrew with the deciding vote and, in a 3–2 split decision (Tim and Shyamala backing Lou and Philippe and Cam backing Tyler), Lou becomes the season's penultimate graduate, though it is Tim's feedback on her public drives that ultimately seals the deal, sending Tyler into the finale with Daniella and Krystal.
8	TBA	December 12, 2016
The Forward and Reverse Slalom: For this last traditional challenge, run in the eighth season, the tenth season and the previous season, the drivers have to drive a 1972 Cadillac Coupe de Ville through a foam arch, and then slalom around a set of foam pedestrians, both forwards and in reverse. Each driver gets 10 attempts and must finish the challenge within 45 seconds. Tyler immediately gets the forward section right, but struggles a lot more while reversing, ultimately taking until his ninth attempt to register a pass. Daniella starts out similar to Tyler, managing the forward section without difficulty, but doing poorly while reversing and being further hampered by Krystal's laughing at and mocking her errors. Tyler takes offense to this and demands that she swap seats with him and all three nominators are just as offended as Tyler, if not more, leading to Jana confronting Krystal, who responds by hurling abuse and obscenities at everyone present, Andrew included, before storming out of the challenge. Despite Krystal's departure, Daniella initially does not do any better, but does manage to get it together and pass on her eighth attempt. Krystal is persuaded to come back and attempt the challenge, but has to be accompanied by Andrew, as no one else is willing to accompany her... and for good reason, as she subsequently fails to make a real effort and never comes close to passing the challenge, leading Andrew to state that, if this challenge alone decided the title of Canada's Worst Driver, Krystal would be awarded the trophy.; Best Performer: Daniella, who in spite of having been made fun of by Krystal during her run, passes at the quickest time with the fewest attempts.; Worst Performer: Krystal, who fails all attempts, did not care about the challenge and for bullying Daniella during the latter's run.; Mustang Challenge: The Mega-Challenge: For the final time this season, the drivers are placed at the wheel of the Mustang and tasked with completing this course which combines several key skills, starting out with an Eye of the Needle/Slalom combo, then driving forwards and backwards through a long corridor of wheel rims (while turning the car around in some concrete Jersey barriers midway), then carry out a Reverse Flick, before driving through a short second slalom and finishing the course with an Icy Corner. Tyler is first-up and turns in what Andrew notes is one of the best Mega Challenge performances in the show's history, with only a single mistake (knocking down a set of wheel rims while reversing) committed during his run. To reward him for such a good performance, Andrew gives him one of his trademark shirts to keep. Krystal is again accompanied by Andrew, because Steven did not want to even be near Krystal after having enough of her attitude, the final straw being Krystal's bullying behaviour towards Daniella in the previous challenge (although he does make an interview cameo at the end). Krystal nearly manages to go one better than Tyler, flawlessly passing every part of the challenge up until the Icy Corner, but ruins an otherwise perfect run by oversteering and braking too late, causing her to go through the wall. Daniella's run proves to be the worst, as she hits one of the foam people during the initial slalom, knocks over several wheel rims in both directions, spins the wrong way during the Reverse Flick (taking out one of the walls of the turning area), somehow manages to tear off the Mustang's rear bumper during the second slalom and ending by failing the Icy Corner.; Best Performer: Tyler, who has only hit one rim during the forward corridor of rims.; Worst Performer: Daniella, who hits many things and breaks off the rear bumper.; Road Test: As with all seasons of the show since the seventh season, the show's decisive drive takes place on the streets of Hamilton, Ontario, this year in a rented 2016 Chevrolet Corvette, with the beginning and ending at the Pier 7 Boardwalk on Discovery Drive. Tyler is up first and commits several errors while driving through the city, including running red lights, making unsafe, illegal turns and nearly failing to get onto the Chedoke Expressway, which he only remedies with an extremely unsafe lane change. After getting onto the highway, the rest of his drive goes without incident, but he ultimately racks up six ticketable offenses that would have cost $1,090 had he been caught. Daniella's drive up until she merges onto the Chedoke Expressway is virtually flawless, despite running a red light at the intersection of Golf Links Road and Stone Church Road early on, but she ultimately crumbles while on the highway to the point where she becomes so nervous and indecisive that Andrew has to guide her through every single decision she makes, something which persists even as she re-enters Hamilton and takes Andrew back to the starting parking lot. Krystal's run is last and, by far, the worst of the three, as she drives in an aggressive and highly unsafe manner throughout, often driving as much as 20 km/h over the limit (something that leaves Cam practically speechless), running red lights and stop signs, making illegal turns, one of which damages the rental car's wheel hubs, as she makes an ill-advised U-turn on James Street South, causing Krystal to become completely unglued to the point she wants to quit her drive right then and there, forcing Andrew to take over and drive into a nearby parking lot to allow Krystal to reconsider quitting her drive, although she would have been better off quitting her drive, as she races against other drivers and cuts them off, making lane changes without signaling or using her mirrors and generally being hostile toward Andrew. The final straw comes when, heading back to the starting point, Krystal responds to Andrew's requests to slow down by deliberately taking a corner at a dangerously unsafe speed, after which she shouts back at Andrew and defiantly makes a sudden brake when Andrew requests Krystal to pull over and stop. After this, Andrew finally decides that he has had enough and, for only the second time in the show's history (after the ninth season), calls a complete halt to the final drive, gets out of the car and storms off, to which Krystal replies by flipping him off and driving back to the starting point without him, leaving Andrew to head back to the starting point with a camera crew.; Best Performer: Tyler, although he made many mistakes throughout his run, at least performed the final road test with minimal help.; Worst Performer: Even though Daniella's nerves and indecisiveness causes her drive to ultimately crumble, Krystal was the worst for purposely breaking many road rules and for her backtalk against Andrew, causing him to storm out of the challenge for the first time.; In his final meeting with the experts, Tyler confidently declares that he is not Canada's Worst Driver, while Daniella admits that, despite having improved as a driver, she still feels far too nervous to drive on the highway. Krystal, meanwhile, remains defiant until the end. Ultimately, the experts agree that there is no need for a discussion over who is the worst of the final three; while Tyler made some major errors on his final drive and Daniella's poor track record, alongside her dangerous indecisiveness on the highway, may have caused her to be named the worst in many previous seasons, Krystal is agreed to be obviously the worst for her hostility and refusal to learn. Andrew, however, does express disappointment that they could not reach through to Krystal properly and feels that they failed as teachers this season. Cam, however, tells him not to feel that way, reminding him and the other experts that there have been others like Krystal that were given an opportunity to make a change, but never took it seriously enough. At the usual trophy presentation, Andrew says that he and the experts decided that, while not yet naming her the worst, Krystal did not deserve the traditional trophy normally awarded to the show's "winner," due to her behavior. Instead, the trophy is turned into a "Final Graduate" trophy and awarded to Tyler. Though Andrew notes that his final drive proves he still has a lot to learn, he also congratulates Tyler for having turned himself around during the course of the season. This, therefore, leaves Krystal and Daniella as the final two (only the fourth time in the show's history that both of the final two are women and the third season in a row). After Tyler leaves, Andrew tells Daniella that while she is not Canada's Worst Driver, she still fails to graduate due to her ultimately being unable to drive on the highway unaided, the one thing she wanted most out of rehab and leaves disappointed at this outcome. In the end, Krystal is named Canada's Worst Driver and not only becomes the twelfth person (eighth woman) to be named as such, but also the first "winner" not to be awarded the trophy, after which she shrugs and flips off Andrew when he turns away from her and then checks her phone.
