= Canada's Worst Driver 10 =

- Season 10
- No. of episodes: 8

Release
- Original network: Discovery Channel
- Original release: October 27 – December 15, 2014

Season chronology
- ← Previous; Canada's Worst Driver Ever Next → Canada's Worst Driver 11

Canada's Worst Driver 10 is the tenth season of the Canadian reality TV show Canada's Worst Driver, which aired on the Discovery Channel. As with previous years, eight people, nominated by their family or friends, enter the Driver Rehabilitation Centre to improve their driving skills. This year, the Driver Rehabilitation Centre is located at the Dunnville Airport in Dunnville, Ontario for the fifth straight season. The initial drive started in Niagara Falls, Ontario and the final road test occurred in Hamilton, Ontario.

== Experts ==
- Cam Woolley is the show's longest-serving expert, having been present in every season except the first and has seen the habits of Canadian drivers change drastically since 2000, with the most common offense having changed from DUI to distracted driving. He is the traffic expert on CP24 in Toronto and had a 25-year career as a traffic sergeant with the Ontario Provincial Police.
- Philippe Létourneau is a veteran high-speed driving instructor who counts BMW and Ferrari among his clients. Since joining the show in the third season, the average car has gained considerably in speed and acceleration, with the high-speed emphasis of this season making his job a particularly important one.
- Shyamala Kiru is the show's resident psychotherapist and relationship expert, a position which has become more demanding each year since joining the show in the seventh season, as the stresses in driving and everyday life seem to always be on the increase. With Shyamala returning for her fourth season (breaking a tie with Dr. Louisa Gembora), that officially makes her the longest-tenured psychologist in Canada's Worst Driver history.
- Tim Danter is the show's head driving instructor, a position he has held since joining the show in the eighth season. In this position, he not only gives the drivers help and instructions for challenges, but gives them further lessons off-screen. With Tim returning for his third season, that ties him with his predecessor, Peter Mellor (the head instructor from seasons five-seven of Canada's Worst Driver) and Scott Marshall (the head instructor from seasons one-three of Canada's Worst Driver) as the longest-tenured head instructor so far.

== Contestants ==
- Ian Brannan, 33, from Kingston, Ontario, is renowned as the worst taxi driver ever, having written off two cars and caused six accidents during just a year. His habit of blaming other drivers and unwillingness to admit to his own faults has resulted in his buddy, Adam, bringing him to rehab, in an attempt to prevent Ian from becoming "Canada's Worst Taxi Driver." He drives a silver Chevrolet Impala and drove a silver Chrysler Sebring to the rehab centre.
- Mariah Carriere, 22, from Port Colborne, Ontario, is a habitual drunk driver whose preferred method of dealing with her anxiety over driving was to ignore any and all driving laws. This carefree attitude has led to a $7,000 insurance bill, and even resulted in her rear-ending a police car while texting at the wheel. Her best friend, Jessica, has nominated Mariah in an effort to finally get her under control. She drives a black Pontiac G5.
- George Firth, 36, from St. Catharines, Ontario, is prone to road rage, enjoys racing other drivers and often spends more time watching TV shows on his smartphone than paying attention to the road. These dangerous habits have caused his best friend, Patrik, to nominate him for rehab. He drives a black Ford F-150.
- Tyler Fitzsimmons, 27, from Notre-Dame-de-l'Île-Perrot, Quebec (near Montreal), is a self-described old man trapped inside a young man's body. His buddy, John "Q" Quart, has nominated him for his extremely over-cautious driving style, something that, oddly enough, does not carry through to Tyler's day job as a light aircraft pilot. Tyler drives a blue Toyota Tercel.
- Jason Marcoux, 45, from Sudbury, Ontario, has a car that is literally held together with duct tape as a result of dozens of accidents caused by apparent issues with vision and spatial awareness, which have resulted in him being pulled over for drunk-driving despite being a teetotaler. His brother, Bart Marcoux, believes that Jason should give up driving, and has brought him to rehab in a last-ditch effort to get to the bottom of Jason's problems. He drives a beige Chevrolet Cavalier and drove an orange Pontiac Wave to the rehab centre.
- Siham Martell, 27, from Calgary, Alberta (originally from Morocco), was a new driver in Halifax, Nova Scotia where her newly found independence was shattered after she was involved in a four-car pile-up in 2010. Now she struggles to keep her composure and her driving skills while at the wheel. Originally nominated by her husband, Wayne Martell, for Canada's Worst Driver 8, she turned down the opportunity, but got nominated again this year in hopes that rehab will restore her confidence in herself. She drives a black Volkswagen Tiguan and drove a black Ford Escape to the rehab centre.
- Santana Pike, 22 and licensed for four years, from Port Aux Basques, Newfoundland (near Corner Brook), is a self-taught and perpetually distracted driver who estimates that she has had between 200 and 300 minor accidents since getting her license in 2010. Her carefree attitude has resulted in her best friend, Jim-Bob Kane, nominating her as the nation's worst driver. She drives a red Chevrolet Cobalt and drove a red Chevrolet Aveo to the rehab centre.
- Chanie Richard, 27 and licensed for nine years, from Calgary, Alberta, is a surface land administrator and mother of one who obtained her Prince Edward Island driving license through "beginner's luck" at the first time of asking and only the second time she had driven overall. Since moving to the big city from the Maritimes, her lack of driving skill has become glaringly obvious to the point that her boyfriend, Jeremy King, has brought her to rehab to gain the driving education she never had. She drives a red GMC Sierra and drove a blue Toyota Yaris to the rehab centre.

== Synopsis ==
Contestant	1	2	3	4	5	6	7	8
Chanie Richard	IN	IN	IN	IN	IN	IN	IN	CWD
Siham Martell	IN	IN	IN	IN	IN	IN	IN	RUNNER-UP
Jason Marcoux	IN	IN	IN	IN	IN	IN	IN	OUT
Tyler Fitzsimmons	IN	IN	IN	IN	IN	IN	OUT	
Mariah Carrière	IN	IN	IN	IN	IN	OUT		
George Firth	IN	IN	IN	OUT				
Santana Pike	IN	IN	OUT					
Ian Brannan	IN	OUT						

The contestant became Canada's Worst Driver.
The contestant was runner-up for Canada's Worst Driver.
The contestant was on the panel's shortlist.
The contestant was under consideration to be expelled from the Driver's Rehabilitation Centre.
The contestant graduated.

== Episodes ==
No.	Title	Original release date
1	"Welcome to Rehab..."	October 27, 2014
The Drive to Rehab: For the second time in three seasons, the journey to the Driver Rehabilitation Centre starts from Niagara Falls, this time from Maxximum Motors, a used car lot on Bridge Street (it has since been replaced with Victory Automobile International), with the eight drivers heading to rehab using a provided set of instructions, a journey that Andrew notes would take most drivers like himself 90 minutes.; Chanie is the first to set off, though Andrew becomes concerned when she admits that she does her make-up and takes 15-20 selfies while at the wheel and especially when she reveals that she isn't quite sure how to turn the car around. During the drive to rehab, she repeatedly runs red lights and illegally stops in a crosswalk. (The same one, in fact, that Canada's Worst Driver 6 "runner-up" Dale Pitton turned left from.); Jason sets off next; his poor eyesight causes him to not only run red lights, but miss vital landmarks and street signs. (Upon his arrival, Andrew tells him that they will be booking an eye test for him as soon as possible.); Siham, who is next to leave, has to take anti-anxiety medication (which she indicates she usually does three times per day) before starting her drive, which goes without any major incidents or errors, though she is still worried. (Upon her arrival, she makes the same vow that Kevin Simmons did in the previous season: by saying that should she be named the worst, she will destroy her driving license and give up driving permanently.); Tyler has the opposite problem than most of the other drivers, proving so over-cautious that he frequently stops at green lights.; Santana frequently runs red lights; her admission of repeatedly hitting things in her hometown results in Andrew admitting that his fellow "Newfies" don't always know how to drive.; Ian becomes the show's first driver to head to rehab in a taxi; during the drive, Adam reprimands him for using excuses to dodge responsibility for his errors, though his drive goes without incident.; Andrew is concerned about not only Mariah's lackadaisical attitude prior to her drive, but Jessica's as well: Mariah subsequently insists on holding onto the directions herself while driving, runs red lights, and even drives the wrong way up a one-way street.; George is the final driver to set out for rehab; during his journey, he drives well over the speed limit, texts while driving, and deliberately tailgates other drivers; he arrives in the fastest time, but only because he disregarded the instructions. (Like Sly Grosjean in the seventh season, he used his smartphone's GPS, causing Andrew to warn him that he needs to do what the show tells him to do.); Results: First to Arrive: Chanie was the first to leave and the first to arrive.; Last to Arrive: Mariah was the last.; Slowest to Arrive: Even though Mariah was the last to arrive, Santana was the slowest, arriving at 3:14.; Fastest to Arrive: Even though Chanie was the first to arrive, George was the fastest, arriving at 1:29.; Cadillac Challenge - Basic Assessment: This season's recurring challenge car is revealed to be a high-performance Cadillac CTS-V that the show purchased for $60,000. The basic skills test is identical to the one used in the previous season, with the drivers first having to reverse through a small course made up of wheel rims, then turn the car around in a space bordered by concrete blocks and finally drive a high-speed slalom.; Santana is the first to take the challenge; her failure to adjust the mirrors (even after Jim-Bob reminds her to do so) results in her knocking down several rims, then badly denting and scraping the Cadillac while turning it around. She then takes the slalom and hits one of the four foam figures.; Tyler doesn't use his mirrors at all, knocking down more rims than Santana and doing a similar amount of damage to the car while turning it around; he then goes too slow in the slalom and hits two of the foam figures.; Mariah actively refuses to use her mirrors despite both Andrew and Jessica reminding her to do so, the latter of whom becomes very worried.; George manages to break the trend, getting through the first two segments of the challenge without hitting a single thing. (Andrew then concludes that George's problem is with his attitude rather than a lack of skill, something demonstrated when he speeds in the slalom and hits the last foam person.); Chanie repeatedly hits the wheel rims in the initial section, puncturing the Cadillac's tire. After the punctured tire is replaced, she strikes the concrete blocks so hardly that she displaces them. She then completes the slalom at half the required speed, while also hitting several of the foam figures and repeatedly hitting the brake pedal rather than the accelerator.; Jason knocks down nearly every set of wheel rims on the left-hand side of the initial section, then causes further damage to the Cadillac's body while turning it around; he takes the slalom at half of the mandates speed.; Ian proves to be incredibly slow, yet still knocks down many wheel rims; then causes more damage while turning around, then goes excessively fast in the slalom, striking two foam figures. (Andrew also points out that there are no formal requirements to becoming a taxi driver in Ontario - other than a $150 additional license; he then attaches a magnetic "Taxi" sign to the Cadillac's roof early in the run.); Siham is the final driver to take the test. Andrew asks her to take the first part of the test without Wayne in the car to boost confidence; she subsequently gets through the wheel rims without a strike. Consequently, when Wayne is brought back into the car, Siham asks him to make the decisions; she subsequently hits two foam figures.; Results: Best Performer: George and Siham were the only two people to pass at least one segment of this challenge, with George doing slightly better.; Worst Performer: Chanie punctured the Cadillac's tires; she also hit the concrete blocks forcefully to the point of displacement. (Jason also did poorly in the wheel rim section, but did slightly better in the slalom than Chanie.); After the initial test, the drivers have their first meeting with the experts. The experts reiterate to Jason the importance of taking an eye test as soon as possible; Andrew then expresses disbelief at the fact that driving-related eye examinations are not mandatory until the age of 80. Mariah is also called out on her attitude toward her drunk-driving, and Cam informs her that should she fatally or non-fatally injure someone while doing so, she would face jail time. Most of the drivers are convinced that they are not Canada's Worst Driver (though Jason, Chanie and Siham admit that they may be). No one graduates this episode, as it serves merely as a skills evaluation.
2	"Crash, Bang, Boom!"	November 3, 2014
Riding the Rails: In a new variation on what was also the first real challenge of the previous season, the drivers each have to drive a Chevy Tracker up a pair of rails, staying on them at all times, then stopping in a marked zone at the end and then reversing back down them. Unlike the previous season, the rails are a continuous slope and do not level off; this confuses Andrew, nearly causing him to fail his demonstration.; Jason takes the challenge first, almost falling off immediately after failing to adjust his mirrors. (After being reminded to adjust them, he gets to the end of the rails; however, he fails after driving too far.); Chanie drives straight off the end of the rails while arguing with Jeremy.; Santana fails almost immediately by falling off the rails before she can even get the car fully on them.; George's overconfidence and carelessness causes him to fall off about halfway up the track.; Mariah has the best performance so far, getting all the way up the track with no problem at all; however, her inattention causes her to fall off when reversing.; Tyler fails almost immediately, not even managing to get on the track correctly.; Before his run, Ian presents Andrew with a list of his irrelevant major issues as a driver. He subsequently gets all the way up the rails, but his drifting causes the car to fall off the rails.; Siham's confidence issues result in her being incredibly slow while taking the challenge. (She, despite taking more than 60 minutes, is the only driver who passes.); During Siham's run, Andrew has time to deliver copies of Ian's list to the experts, who question his suitability for rehab if the main issues can be addressed outside of the show.: Results: Best Performer: Siham, despite her slow pace, is the only driver to pass this challenge.; Worst Performer: Santana and Tyler both failed the challenge almost immediately.; Head-to-Head Reversing: In this challenge, previously run in the eighth season, the drivers are split up into two Honda Civic coupes and have to reverse in a straight line down a short course, turn around in a small area at the bottom and then reverse back up the lane they started in.; Santana and Siham are the first heat - while Santana completes the course quickly and flawlessly, Siham refuses to apply the advice to look where she wants to go; combined with her slow speed, she causes major damage to the course.; Jason and Tyler are the second heat - Tyler gets down the starting lane with minimal issue, but his wide turns in the bottom part of the course result in him knocking down several of the wheel rims bordering the course; he additionally holds the steering wheel at the bottom; Jason experiences repeated collisions in both directions.; Chanie and Mariah make up the third heat - both fail after experiencing several collisions in both directions. Chanie, however, takes on more damage.; George and Ian are the final heat - while George passes with no issue, Ian (who again has a "Taxi" sign attached to the roof of his car) has the worst run of the day by veering wildly around the course and causing massive amounts of damage.; Results: Best Performer: George and Santana both passed without a single hit.; Worst Performer: Ian caused more hits than any other driver.; Cadillac Challenge: Eye of the Needle: For this, one of the show's most well-known challenges, each driver must drive the Cadillac at a constant 70 km/h, and navigate it through five arches which have been each staggered by the width of a highway lane.; A combination of her shock at the Cadillac's power and failing to look at the direction she wants to go results in Santana hitting two of the first three arches, missing the last two entirely.; Tyler's performance is more improved, but he fails to drive the required speed, clipping two of the arches and smashing the final one.; Mariah drives excessively over the required speed (speeding up to 100 km/h), destroying the third arch and not being able to reach the fourth.; Chanie smashes all but one of the arches due to driving too fast (at 90 km/h) and wearing wedge shoes.; George first belittles the drivers who failed to complete this challenge in previous seasons; subsequently, he gets through the course without hitting anything. (However, his run is deemed a failure since he took the course at 85 km/h instead of the required 70 km/h.); Jason drives at 90 km/h; he smashes three of the arches and destroys a camera placed by the side of the course.; Siham quickly loses her composure after hitting three arches, and missing one, eventually failing the challenge.; Ian manages to get through most of the arches, but ruins an otherwise-decent run by smashing the third arch.; Results: Best Performer: George was the only driver not to hit any arches. (However, he was reprimanded for taking the run 15 km/h too fast.); Worst Performers: Chanie smashed more arches than any other driver, while Jason destroyed almost as many arches and totaled a camera as well.; After the Eye of the Needle, the experts meet with Ian about the list he gave Andrew prior to the Riding the Rails Challenge, noting that the issues he listed indicate that he is someone who until now simply wasn't prepared to put in the effort required to be a good driver, rather than suffering from any technical issues. Ian then admits that he has decided to give up being a taxi driver and that the only reason he was even doing the job was to fund the journalism degree that he's currently undertaking. George is the only driver who actively wants to graduate, while the others all admit that the drivers still need to work before they can even consider graduating.: The panel are split: Andrew and Philippe want to graduate George for being technically the most proficient driver.; Cam and Shyamala favour the notion of graduating Ian, who has shown awareness of the issues he needs to address; they also feel that George's arrogant attitude and the possibility of him teaching bad habits to Cody is a deal-breaker.; Tim casts the deciding vote, naming Ian becomes the first graduate of the season.; Before Ian drives himself home, Andrew makes him remove the "Taxi" sign from his car, wishing him a successful career in journalism.
3	"What Just Happened?"	November 10, 2014
Distracted Driving: In the first episode, Cam noted that when the series began, DUI was the country's most common motoring offense. However, distracted driving has taken over: nearly all the drivers in rehab are guilty of being distracted. (Tyler eats, drinks, and smokes while at the wheel; Jason reads newspapers; and everyone else uses their cellphone while driving.) Excluding Siham (who refuses to be distracted), the drivers are each asked to drive a simple course in a Ford Mustang coupe while undertaking the task that causes them to be distracted.; Santana causes severe damage to the course even while sending simple texts.; Tyler does even more damage while drinking from a bottle of soda, then only worsens the damage by looking for the lid.; Chanie causes the same amount of damage to the course just finding her cellphone; it then culminates in a severe accident when she takes a selfie, nearly flipping over the car.; Jason's run is more improved; however, he still causes a lot of damage both while eating a cupcake and reading from a drivers' handbook.; George is asked to call his fiancée, Michelle, during his run; she speaks to Andrew over the speakerphone, revealing just how much she's been trying to break his habits.; Mariah doesn't take the challenge seriously by laughing throughout the destruction she causes while simultaneously eating and driving.; Reverse Figure-Eight: In another frequent challenge, the drivers are each placed at the wheel of a second-generation Dodge Ram Campervan covered with a huge number of signalling lights, and tasked with reversing around a course shaped like a figure-eight, with the other drivers as their passengers.; Mariah quickly sets off without bothering to adjust her mirrors or using them at all; she ends up hitting 13 objects, with her run deemed a failure by not taking the course seriously.; Chanie ends up hitting 32 objects due to her inability to understand front-end swing.; Tyler doesn't understand how to counteract the front-end swing, leading to a similarly poor run in which he hits 25 objects. (Prior to his run, Tyler puts the other drivers at ease with a mock preflight announcement.); George hits an object early on, but quickly fixes his mistakes and doesn't hit another thing during his run (finishing faster than Andrew did in his demonstration).; Santana fails to adjust or use her mirrors early on; however, she grasps the technique and doesn't hit anything after the first corner.; Even with his new glasses, Jason hits 17 things. (Before Jason's run, it's revealed that he was sent for an eye examination the previous day: his bad eyesight was caused by a combination of early-stage glaucoma and nerve damage caused by excess pressure on his eyeballs. Due to the poor eyesight, the attending optometrist says he is obligated to contact the Ministry of Transportation.); Siham has the final run; her anxiety causes her to give up after the first corner. (Andrew therefore takes her for a private lesson elsewhere in the rehab centre, teaching her proper mirror usage.); Results: Best Performer: George and Santana finished quickly and with minimal hits.; Worst Performer: Siham gave up almost immediately; of the remaining drivers who completed the challenge, Chanie had the highest number of hits, with 32.; Cadillac Challenge - The Shoulder-Check Challenge: After the drivers each get a lesson from Philippe in proper driving posture, they are each tasked with driving up a lane at a fixed 70 km/h and then shoulder-checking two towers to see whether they will be required to turn left or right around an obstacle at the end of the lane. Each driver gets two attempts.; Siham correctly shoulder-checks, but changes lanes too late and hits the obstacle; on her second run, she turns the wheel while shoulder-checking, hitting the barriers bordering the lane.; Tyler, like Siham, turns too late in his first run, then swerves around erratically on his second, failing both attempts.; Mariah passes with ease on her first run.; Chanie turns the wheel while shoulder-checking, causing her to hit the barrier and the obstacle; she fails her second attempt by braking too sharply.; George fails by turning too soon and then by turning into the wrong lane.; Jason turns the wheel while shoulder-checking and consequently clips the barrier, along with failing to even drive at the required speed. (He subsequently passes on his second attempt.); Santana has the final run and performs flawlessly, passing on the first attempt.; Results: Best Performer: Mariah and Santana, who both passed flawlessly on their first attempts.; Worst Performer: Siham and Tyler were the worst as they failed both of their attempts. (Chanie also failed both attempts, but only narrowly on the second run.); Most of the drivers tell the experts without any hesitation that they will never drive while distracted again; Jason also reveals that he's going to wear his glasses full-time from now on. However, while Mariah vows never to drink-drive again, she won't commit to also giving up the use of her phone while driving. The biggest concern is Siham's defeatist attitude, as she openly admits that she isn't overly concerned whether or not she continues to drive, refusing to commit to making herself a better driver.: Every one of the experts has a different opinion on who should leave rehab: Tim is in favour of expelling Siham for showing no desire to learn (which would have made her the second contestant in the show's history to be expelled by the experts for showing no desire to learn, after Colin Sheppard from the second season).; Shyamala says that no one should graduated.; Philippe feels that, with glasses, it's safe to return Jason to the roads.; Cam says that George is the most technically skilled, nominating him for graduation.: Andrew wants to graduate Santana for showing the best attitude and passing both challenges this episode.; Andrew is eventually able to convince the other judges to back his fellow Newfie, and Santana becomes the second graduate of the season. Note: This episode did not display an opening title screen or broadcast the opening animation.
4	"Piece of Cake"	November 17, 2014
The Speed Perception Challenge: In a brand-new challenge, the drivers are each put at the wheel of a decommissioned police cruiser, which has its instrument panel hidden behind a plastic shield (though a camera points behind the shield to show the crew the speedometer). They are then tasked with taking two runs, one where they drive in a straight line to 50 km/h and a second where they're asked to drive to 70 km/h, then brake sharply before hitting a "wall" made up of foam boxes. The difficulty of this challenge is demonstrated when Andrew fails his demonstration, driving at 75 km/h on the second part and hitting the boxes, though not hard enough to knock them over.; Mariah is too slow in her first run, driving at just 38 km/h. She drives at almost exactly 70 km/h on the second part, but her delayed braking causes the car run into the wall.; Tyler performs identically to Mariah on the first run, while Jason drives far too fast at 65 km/h. Both are presumed to have failed, like Mariah.; Chanie also drives too fast on her second run (80 km/h) and delays braking, resulting in her completely demolishing the wall.; Siham succeeds in the second part of the challenge, but her run is deemed a failure because Wayne was directing her speed throughout.; George also drives too fast; despite braking almost perfectly, he still runs through the wall.; The Water-Tank Challenge: For this annual challenge, the drivers must navigate an early 1990s Volvo station wagon with a roof-mounted 400 litres (110 US gal) water tank (specially reinforced to prevent a recurrence of the incident from the previous season when Canada's Worst Driver 3 "runner-up" Shelby D'Souza accidentally broke the tank midway through his run, losing 100 litres (26 US gal) of water) through a course designed to test their ability to drive smoothly.: Andrew has another rocky demonstration, getting soaked three times, but only loses 25 litres (6.6 US gal) of water.; Tyler loses large amounts of water on every part of the course, in addition to knocking down a foam person in the final slalom; he loses 180 litres (48 US gal).; While George only loses 60 litres (16 US gal) (the smallest amount other than Andrew), his braking and acceleration are erratic throughout the challenge.; Jason loses over half the water on the opening straight alone due to jerky acceleration and sharp braking; he loses 150 litres (40 US gal).; Siham also drives erratically throughout, and the experts note that Wayne's advice is becoming as much of a problem as Siham's own lack of self-confidence; she loses 140 litres (37 US gal).; Mariah loses 280 litres (74 US gal) of water; Chanie loses exactly the same amount of water due to repeated sharp braking.; Results: Best Performer: Even though everyone's driving was rough, George lost far less water than any other driver.; Worst Performer: Chanie and Mariah lost almost all of the water in the tank.; Cadillac Challenge - Swerve and Avoid: In what is regarded one of the show's most important challenges due to its potential to save lives, each driver has to drive down a straight section at 70 km/h, toward two openings. An oversized foam birthday cake will then appear in one of the openings and the driver must steer the car into the other opening, with looking where they want to go an important element of the challenge.; Chanie, who still insists on wearing wedges despite Andrew's pleas to the contrary, fails her first attempt by failing to look where she wants to go, stomping + locking on the brakes, and then skidding directly into the lane that the cake appeared in, badly damaging the Cadillac's front bumper. (On her second attempt, she manages to steer into the correct lane, passing her first challenge.); Before George's run, more footage of Tim's private lessons with Cody is shown; Cody is quickly becoming aware of the faults in his father's (and his own) techniques. When he takes his run, George drives at 80 km/h, but still successfully passes the challenge.; Siham fails her first run by initially steering toward the cake and failing to correct her in time, with Wayne's continued chatter only worsening her performance. (The Cadillac's front bumper, which had already been badly damaged in Chanie's first run, also detaches itself from the car.) On her second run, she chooses her lane before the cake even appears; on top of that, she also locked up the brakes and skidded for 15 m (49 ft).; Jason fails his first attempt when he looks at the cake, thus steering directly into it; he then passes on his second go after Andrew reminds him to look where he wants to go.; Tyler drives too fast (at 90 km/h) and fails his first run by steering directly into the cake. He drives at the right speed on his second run, but again drives straight into the cake, leaving Tyler as the only remaining driver to fail all challenges so far.; On Mariah's first run, she fixates on the wall dividing the two exits, never sees the cake, and smashes directly through the wall. Despite Jessica pointing out that she saw the cake with plenty of time to spare, Mariah refuses to acknowledge her error; this results in her losing her second attempt on the course.; Results: Best Performer: George was the only driver to pass on his first attempt.; Worst Performer: Mariah, whose attitude got the challenge halted after her first run. (Of the drivers who did get two runs, Tyler performed the worst, steering right at the cake both times.); After the Swerve and Avoid, George is finally told that Cody has been brought to rehab and he takes George and Andrew on a quick drive through the surrounding area to demonstrate that, if anything, Cody is now an even better driver than his father. George acknowledges his bad teaching habits, such as his arrogance and teaching his son, Cody, bad driving habits. After passing all three challenges and demonstrating improvement in his attitude, George becomes the third graduate.
5	"1 - 2 - 3 - Go!"	November 24, 2014
Airbag Safety: Before the first challenge, Andrew gives the remaining five drivers a brief safety lesson on the dangers of the violent inflation of an airbag, as nearly all of them have bad habits that could cause them to be injured. (Mariah's constant smartphone use, Tyler's habit of hunching over his wheel, Jason's incorrect wheel grip, and Chanie's bizarre driving posture. Siham is the only driver with no major issues in this department, having been in a four-car pileup in 2010.) The triggering of a Honda Civic's passenger-side airbag is shown to be so violent that it blows the rear-view mirror into the car's backseat.; School Bus Three-Point Turn: While challenges involving a three-point turn are commonplace for the show, the task is much harder this year, as the drivers each have to drive a school bus (which Andrew adds is being used to give the drivers a lesson in front-end swing) into a large turning space bordered by cars and make a three-point turn without hitting anything. Each driver has 40 minutes in which to complete the challenge.; Chanie, who didn't even know what a three-point turn was until a few days ago, initially doesn't use her mirrors, making no effort to avoid hitting the cars. She still manages to pass before her time limit expires. (Andrew draws her a map to illustrate how to do the challenge, and she completes it on her next turn.); Like Chanie, Tyler also didn't know what a three-point turn was, but he manages to carry it out on his first turn without Andrew even needing to explain it, finally passing his first challenge of the season.; Jason fails all of his first three runs within seconds, as the front-end swing causes him to hit the barriers leading into the turning space, then runs out of time.; Siham succeeds on her first go, but the pass is questionable since Wayne directed her throughout.; Mariah ends up using the entire 40 minutes on her first attempt alone, as her overly-tight turning causes her to get stuck, causing her to fail. (However, Andrew teaches her how to do the three-point turn after the challenge has officially ended.); Results: Best Performer: Tyler, who passed on his first try with minimal assistance.; Worst Performer: Mariah was the worst for using up the entire allotted 40 minutes just making one attempt.; Forward Handbrake J-Turn: In what is noted to be one of the show's harder challenges, the drivers must each drive a Ford Mustang coupe into a small turning space at 50 km/h and use the handbrake to spin the car around 180° while dodging an oversized foam birthday cake, before safely driving out of the space. Each driver has three chances to succeed.; In his first turn, Jason forgets that he's supposed to use the handbrake, hitting the far wall with the car still entirely facing forwards. (He makes a similar mistake by using the footbrake on his second turn.) He finally gets the technique on his third attempt, but Jason ends up hitting the side wall.; Tyler relies on Q to read out his speed during his first two attempts - he fails his first attempt when he uses the footbrake; his second attempt goes better by spinning the car by about 140°; and his final attempt is taken too fast at 60 km/h. By the third attempt, he does the technique correctly.; (Andrew tells him that his speeding would normally cause this to be deemed a failure, but agrees to call it a pass since he did it without Q's help.): Chanie is seen to pass the challenge on her first attempt. (However, the experts & Andrew reject the pass, as she pulled the handbrake early, missing the cake by just inches.) Chanie subsequently passes the challenge on her third attempt.; Wayne asks to sit out Siham's run, concerned that the challenge would trigger his motion sickness; Andrew is glad to take his place in the car, as it will force Siham to think for herself. (In contrast, Siham smashes through the outer walls on all three attempts.); Mariah's run is less dramatic, but she fails all three attempts due to her using the footbrake instead of the handbrake.; Results: Best Performer: Chanie and Tyler were the only ones to pass this challenge, with both needing all three attempts.; Worst Performer: Siham was the worst, as she crashed through the turning area's outer walls on each attempt.; Cadillac Challenge - The Reverse Flick: In an attempt to take advantage of the previous lesson still being fresh in the heads of the drivers, the show's other car-spinning challenge is the next one to be held. This time the drivers have to reverse into a turning space at 40 km/h and again spin the car around 180°, with the number of chances also being three. Due to Andrew only narrowly passing his demonstration, the course is widened to make the difficulty easier for the others.; Jason fails all three attempts - on his first attempt, he delays steering; on his subsequent attempts, he ends up crashing through the barriers.; Mariah also smashes the entry barriers on her first attempt by failing to look at the direction she is traveling to, but passes on her second attempt after she focuses properly.; On his first attempt, Tyler hits the entry barriers; he fails his second attempt due to driving too fast (at 60 km/h) & turning late.; Siham becomes the third driver in a row to hit the barriers in her first run; her refusal to stop results in her smashing one of the turning area's walls. (Before she takes another run, Siham gets a private lesson from Andrew; she ends up passing with his help.); After failing her first run by smashing the entry barriers at high speed, Chanie admits to having no reversing experience on the final run. (She then passes with ease.); Results: Best Performer: Chanie, Mariah and Siham, who all passed on their second attempts.; Worst Performer: Jason and Tyler, who failed the challenge entirely.; While Chanie is noted to be the obvious front-runner to graduate, as she passed every challenge, she admits that she does not fully comprehend all the challenges and wishes to stay in rehab for the time being. Siham and Tyler, who both passed two challenges, also express their desire not to graduate.: Mariah and Jason aren't considered for graduation due to the minimal challenges that they passed.; Cam and Philippe nominate Chanie to graduate, as she was statistically the best driver this episode, though Cam is unsure about letting Chanie graduate.; Shyamala and Tim agree that Siham is the person who deserves to graduate, as they consider her the most technically adept of the five remaining drivers, despite her confidence issues.; This leaves Andrew to cast the deciding vote; however, he elects not to back Chanie or Siham, as he feels they are both still lacking in focus and confidence, respectively. The episode ends with no one graduating (which Andrew notes has become an annual tradition for the show).: Web Extra: Road Signs: As is often done on the show, each of the drivers was given a brief test by Tim on their road sign awareness. Siham and Tyler post the joint-highest scores (their total is not revealed), while Chanie posts the worst score, getting just 3/10 and although she correctly identifies a "yield" sign, Chanie admits to having no idea what she's actually supposed to do when she sees one when driving.
6	"Know Your Limits"	December 1, 2014
Canada's Worst Parking Lot: All the drivers admit to having caused at least one accident while in a parking lot (even Siham, who is regarded as the best-behaved of the drivers, once broke her driving-side mirror), leading to this semi-regular challenge being held. Each driver has a different car and is required to reverse into a parking spot when it opens up; furthermore, each driver is permitted no more than three or four turns while parking.; Mariah and Siham get into parking spots, albeit failingfor taking too long to do it.; Chanie (who is disadvantaged by having by far the largest vehicle) reverses into a marked "parent with child" spot.; Jason hits a bus and then illegally parks in a disabled spot, a mistake then made by Mariah, who is ignorant about parking laws.; Tyler becomes the first person to park, doing so without any trouble; Chanie fails two more attempts due to hitting another car and poorly aligned parking respectively.; Siham then passes, with Mariah also passing shortly after that, though their techniques are far from perfect.; After more and more failed attempts from Chanie and Jason, Andrew calls a halt to the challenge, declaring that they have both failed.; Results: Best Driver: Tyler was the first to get parked up with minimal difficulty.; Worst Performer: Chanie and Jason both failed to get parked up at all.; Parallel Parking: Due to the generally poor performances in the last challenge, a full parallel parking challenge is held next, with Tim giving each driver extensive lessons in how to park without hitting anyone or anything. Each driver has ten attempts in the decommissioned police cruiser.; Siham passes without any mistakes.; Mariah passes with six attempts.; Despite being the best performer in the previous challenge, Tyler fails all ten attempts.; Jason remembers the lesson and passes on his fifth attempt.; Chanie hits more things on her first run alone than all the other drivers combined. Like Tyler, all ten of her runs end in failure.; Results: Best Performer: Siham, who passed on her first attempt without difficulty.; Worst Performer: Chanie and Tyler, since all ten of their runs ended in failure, although Tyler was more attentive during his attempts.; Cadillac Challenge - The Slalom: In a variation on the third part of the initial skills test, each driver has to first slalom around five foam people at 80 km/h, then move the people closer together to the shortest distance they feel safe steering around. Jason can't even complete the initial run, but still insists on a totally unrealistic 10 m (33 ft) reduction in the distance between each figure; he fails by smashing two of the figures, ending up in the adjoining field.; Siham completes the first section, then completes a course with a 2 m (6.6 ft) figure distance reduction.; Mariah passes the first section just as easily as Siham; she then performs equally well in the second section despite an ambitious 5 m (16 ft) reduction, causing Andrew to admit a toss-up graduation between her and Mariah.; Chanie relies on Jeremy to watch her speed, failing her first run. She elects to take her second run with the figures spaced the same distance apart, but she closes her eyes during the run, which ends up resulting in her smashing off the Cadillacs' rear bumper.; Tyler has the final run; he fails to grip the steering wheel correctly. Tyler then insists on the same 5 m (16 ft) reduction that Mariah had; his second attempt not only results in him smashing the same number of foam people as in his first run, but he locks up the brakes and spins completely out of control.; Results: Best Performer: Mariah and Siham; though Mariah managed a greater reduction between the figures than Siham, both were considered equally aware of their limitations.; Worst Performer: Jason was the worst for asking for an even more unrealistic distance reduction than Tyler did.; Mariah and Siham are easily agreed on as the only two possible nominees, as they both passed every challenge this episode and want to graduate. Jason only partially puts himself forward to graduate, while Tyler and Chanie admit to stay in rehab in order to improve.; Tim and Shyamala back Mariah to graduate, with Tim feeling that she has superior technical skills & confidence and Shyamala convinced that Mariah has drastically reformed her attitude.; Philippe and Cam back Siham to graduate for performing better than Mariah in all the challenges, once again leaving Andrew with the deciding vote.; Andrew chooses Mariah as the next graduate. Before she leaves the Driver Rehabilitation Centre, Mariah gets a tattoo on her left forearm, to specifically remind her never to drink-drive again. (Mariah appears in a bonus clip of Canada's Worst Driver 12 in an attempt by Andrew to reform eventual "winner" Krystal McCann from texting and driving prior to Krystal's final drive.): Web Extra: Parallel Parking, Cont'd: Extra footage of the drivers' attempts at the parallel parking challenge is shown. Siham admits gaining a lot of confidence after her practically flawless performance; Mariah complains that parking spaces should be bigger; Chanie optimistically asks Jeremy whether he'd trust her parallel parking his truck, which he immediately answers in the negative; Tyler admits that he didn't carry out a single part of the challenge correctly and is ashamed of his performance; and Jason says that he has "won the battle, but not the war.".
7	"Slip and Slide"	December 8, 2014
The Longest Reversing Challenge Ever: This challenge, which has been held annually since the eighth season, has the drivers reversing a 1993-model Mustang through a 1 kilometre-long course bordered by wheel rims, cars, concrete blocks and foam obstacles. While each driver is allowed to take the challenge at their own pace, Andrew emphasizes that the challenge is timed and says that ideally, each driver should be travelling at 50 km/h by the latter, wider stages of the course.; Tyler manages to avoid knocking any wheel rims down, but he repeatedly hits and scrapes the car, then smashes both of the wing mirrors.; Chanie relies her wing mirrors to reverse and steers very erratically, resulting in her knocking down nearly half the wheel rims in the opening section; her speed is also slower than Tyler. She ends up hitting 32 objects in all.; Jason's run is just as poor as Chanie's in the early sections despite actually trying to use the correct technique. During the later, wider parts, he only hits a few objects.; Siham constantly veers to the right and very rarely looks out the back window, before speeding up to 80 km/h and eventually spinning violently out of the course, meaning that her performance actually ends up being the worst performance in this challenge.; Results: Best Performer: Tyler hit fewer things than anyone else.; Worst Performer: Siham was the worst for driving at a dangerously fast speed and losing control of the car.; The Cross: Before this challenge, a brief clip is shown of Andrew introducing the challenge in previous seasons and former Canada's Worst Driver "winners": Jason Zhang, Ashley van Ham, Lance Morin, Shirley Sampson, and Kevin Simmons, all attempting this challenge (and eventually failing) in their respective seasons.: This year, the challenge requires them to turn around the Dodge Ram Campervan (which is still covered in signal lights) in a small cross-shaped course made up from concrete barriers.; Jason gets the first run, which sees him complete the challenge in 21 minutes with no major hits at all. Jason's nominator, Bart, is impressed with Jason's performance.; Tyler hits the van eight times making the first 90° turn; he then destroys the lights and the strengthening bar of the van. (It takes him 29 minutes to finish the challenge, with a total of 36 hits.); Chanie proceeds through the challenge recklessly by not using her mirror; while she completes the in the fastest time (16 minutes), she hits the blocks 46 times.; Siham again relies on Wayne to make all the decisions during her run. She subsequently gets frustrated at him when she fails her run by not listening to his advice.; Results: Best Performer: Jason was the only driver not to hit anything during his run.; Worst Performer: Chanie and Tyler were labeled the worst drivers - Chanie for causing more hits than anyone else and Tyler for being the slowest.; The Icy Corner (This was originally supposed to be the episode's Cadillac Challenge, but Andrew reveals that the car will not start due to damaged electronics): The decommissioned police cruiser has been pressed into service for this challenge, which requires the drivers to safely navigate a simulated icy corner at 45 km/h. Each driver gets five attempts.; Chanie's drives at nearly 70 km/h, locks up the brakes, and doesn't look where she wants to go on her first attempt. She fails her next three runs for exactly the same reasons; on her last run, she finally gets the technique right, but her speeding and late braking cost her a pass.; Despite Andrew's reminder to not speed prior to his first run, Tyler not only speeds, but fails to look where he wants to go. He then fails his second, third, and fourth attempts after repeatedly pumping the brakes. (His fifth attempt nearly ends in success, but he clips the end of the wall.); Siham relies on Wayne to monitor her speed during her first run, but she pumps on the brakes and combined with speeding, a mistake made on her four remaining turns.; Despite Andrew reminding him not to speed, Jason fails all five of his attempts due to constant speeding and improper braking techniques.; (Jason's subsequent fail results in a 100% failure rate for the challenge for the first time in the show's history.): Results: Best Performer: None of the four drivers passed the challenge.; Worst Performer: Chanie, Jason, and Siham came nowhere closest to passing the challenge. (Tyler also failed the challenge, but was close to passing on his fifth attempt, with the pass being ruined by a late braking.); The experts face a major quandary, as there was only one clear challenge pass in the entire episode: Jason's performance in The Cross.: Of greater concern, however, are the weak performances in the Longest Reversing Challenge Ever: Jason ruins his chances of graduation by saying he thought the point of the challenge was to complete it as fast as possible.; Chanie also admits to the same mistakes that Jason pointed out; however, unlike him, she concedes that it was clearly the wrong thing to do.; Siham shows no awareness of how fast she actually went during the challenge.; Tyler also gets reprimanded over his bad performance on that challenge. However, because his performance was the best in the challenge, he is given a pass the Icy Corner run.; However, due to the disappointing performances, Andrew suggests a four-person final (something he previously suggested in the seventh season before ultimately graduating Afiya Lassy), a suggestion that none of the experts take up. Their discussions are not shown; however, Andrew gives Tyler his license back, telling him that they were still the best of the group (even if his performances in the reversing and Icy Corner challenges were disappointing). This - along with him having more confidence compared to Siham and being more aware of his mistakes than Jason - results in him becoming the season's penultimate graduate, sending Jason into the finale with Chanie and Siham. (Incidentally, this also makes this the first Canada's Worst Driver season where every finalist was shortlisted as a potential graduate at least once.)
8	"Icing on the Cake..."	December 15, 2014
The Forward and Reverse Slalom: The finale begins with this challenge, in which each driver has to steer a 1977 Pontiac Parisienne coupe in a slalom around four foam people, in both directions. Each driver has ten runs and must finish the challenge within 45 seconds.; Jason (the only male nominee remaining after Tyler graduated last episode) is first to try the challenge, immediately managing the forward section without any trouble, but goes too slow and makes wide turns while reversing. (However, his runs gradually improve, passing by the eight attempt.); Siham ends up hitting the very first foam person in her forward run; on her second run, she smashes several of the foam people while reversing, then destroys the foam arch that serves as the challenge's starting point. (Additionally, she drives off the track on two instances.); Chanie predicts that she will pass the challenge in one attempt; in contrast, however, she smashes a foam person in her first forward run, then ruins her third run by hitting the starting arch. After several attempts resulting in the arch being hit, she fails after time expires.; The Mega-Challenge: With all attempts to repair the Cadillac having failed, the Mustang is called into service for this year's final challenge. The course layout is virtually identical to the previous year, beginning with an Eye of the Needle/Slalom combo taken at 60 km/h, then a precision drive through wheel rims in both directions, during which the car must be turned around in a tight section of concrete blocks. After leaving the wheel rims, the car has to be turned around with a reverse flick and finally negotiated through an icy corner.; Chanie struggles throughout the challenge by hitting the foam pedestrians during the arches, causing vehicle damage, and pausing mid-run to apply makeup. She ends up failing both the reverse flick and icy corner tests while believing that Siham deserved the dishonor of Canada's Worst Driver.; Jason starts start in the slalom, but he gradually accumulates heavy vehicle damage during the turnaround section; he ultimately fails both the reverse flick and icy corner maneuvers.; Siham's nominator, Wayne, was ordered out Andrew from the car. Despite the absence of Wayne, Siham still struggles through the precision steering, reverse flick, and icy corner challenges.; Best Performer: Jason, who passed everything up to and including the first precision steering section.; Worst Performer: Chanie, who didn't successfully complete one section of the challenge.; Road Test: The road test is conducted on the streets of Hamilton, Ontario (the location of the show's decisive drive since Canada's Worst Driver 7), this time in a Ford Thunderbird, with the beginning and ending in front of the Residences of Royal Connaught on King Street East.; Jason misses the first turn; his subsequent U-turn results in him causing traffic backup. He runs red lights and stops at green lights, makes prohibited turns and stops in crosswalks. He gets onto the Chedoke Expressway safely enough, but slows down and drops gear. He then misses the Aberdeen Avenue turn-off, then makes an unsafe lane change to get back on-track. After his run is over, with 16 moving violations that would cost him $1,865 had he been caught, Andrew predicts that the only way Jason will avoid the title of Canada's Worst Driver is if either Chanie or Siham do worse.; Chanie stops in the very first intersection after exiting the starting point, twice. It is then followed by illegal lane changes, driving in the wrong lane, making prohibited turns, and even driving in a bus lane through a bus terminal (the same one, in fact, that Canada's Worst Driver 8 co-"winner" Flora Wang drove into on her own final drive). She drives below the speed limit on the highway and makes exactly the same illegal lane change that Jason did while exiting the highway. After her drive, Andrew points out the 24 moving violations that would cost her $2,715 had she been caught.; Siham, like Jason, misses the first turn; she then cuts through a parking lot and drives the wrong way down King William Street. The rest of her drive goes mostly without incident, with the exception turning off onto the Main Street West exit, then re-entering the flow of traffic and leaving her indicator light on. This is subsequently followed by a U-turn in the intersection of John Street South and Charlton Avenue East (in front of St. Joseph's Healthcare Hamilton's Charlton) against a red light. In the end, Siham ends with 10 moving violations that would cost her $1,450 had she been caught.; Best Performer: Jason and Siham - Jason committed more careless moving violations than Siham, while Siham committed fewer ticketable offenses.; Worst Performer: Chanie, who racked almost as many ticketable offenses as Jason and Siham combined.; After the Road Test, the drivers each have their final meeting with the experts. Despite her earlier lackadaisical attitude, Chanie shows more awareness of what exactly went wrong as she talks to the experts. However, she reveals that she was supposed to be on medication for her loss of focus; due to the delay, she has been driving without the medication, leaving the experts and Andrew horrified. Andrew tells her that he would not have allowed her to take her final drive if he had known earlier; Cam then warns Chanie that her failure to take her medication contributed to death by dangerous driving could result in the same range of punishments as a murder charge. A reprimand is then given to Siham, due to the dangerous mistakes during her highway run and a potentially fatal collision on the four-way intersection; she tries to blame the former mistake on the off-ramp being too short, but admits to learning a lot from rehab. Of the three, Jason is the most willing to admit to his mistakes, but the experts are unconvinced about exactly how much he has learned.: For the first time in the show's history, there are effectively three in contention for Canada's Worst Driver, due to all three drivers performing poorly on the final road test.; Shyamala wants Siham to be the final graduate for having the best overall track record of the final three and having the least eventful road test, advocating for naming Chanie and Jason the joint-worst (which, if it occurred, would be the second time that two drivers became Canada's Worst Driver, after Kevin Simmons and Flora Wang in the eighth season).; Cam nominates Siham to be Canada's Worst Driver, feeling that the mistakes she did make were more likely to result in a fatality than any of the 24 mistakes Chanie committed.; Tim deems Chanie the worst for her lack of focus and failure to take responsibility for her actions.; Philippe thinks Jason is the worst, pointing out that he ran several red lights, nearly resulting in wrecks.; With the panel unable to agree who should be the final graduate, the decision on the final three's rankings ends up once again falling to Andrew. When the three drivers assemble for the trophy presentation, Andrew announces that Jason is not Canada's Worst Driver. Instead, he becomes the season's final graduate, as he showed the most improvement of the final three, had the best performance on the two final Rehab Centre challenges, and show the best performance on the final drive. This leaves Chanie and Siham. Chanie is named Canada's Worst Driver because she did not learn anything from her time on the show (aside from not to drive distracted) and showed no real improvement in her driving skill. She also showed a reckless disregard for safety by not disclosing that she was supposed to be on medication. (While Siham does not graduate, Andrew notes that she did improve significantly in rehab and believes that she will become a good driver again someday.) As the episode ends, Andrew cuts up what is seen to be Chanie's driving license, but reveals that what he actually destroyed was a duplicate license that she gave him on the first day of rehab. He then gives Chanie the trophy and her actual license back before Jeremy drives her away as the tenth person (sixth woman) to be awarded the trophy.
