= Port Caledonia =

Community in Nova Scotia, Canada

Coordinates: 46°10′53″N 59°54′38″W

Port Caledonia Gàidhlig: An Port Cailleannach
- Community
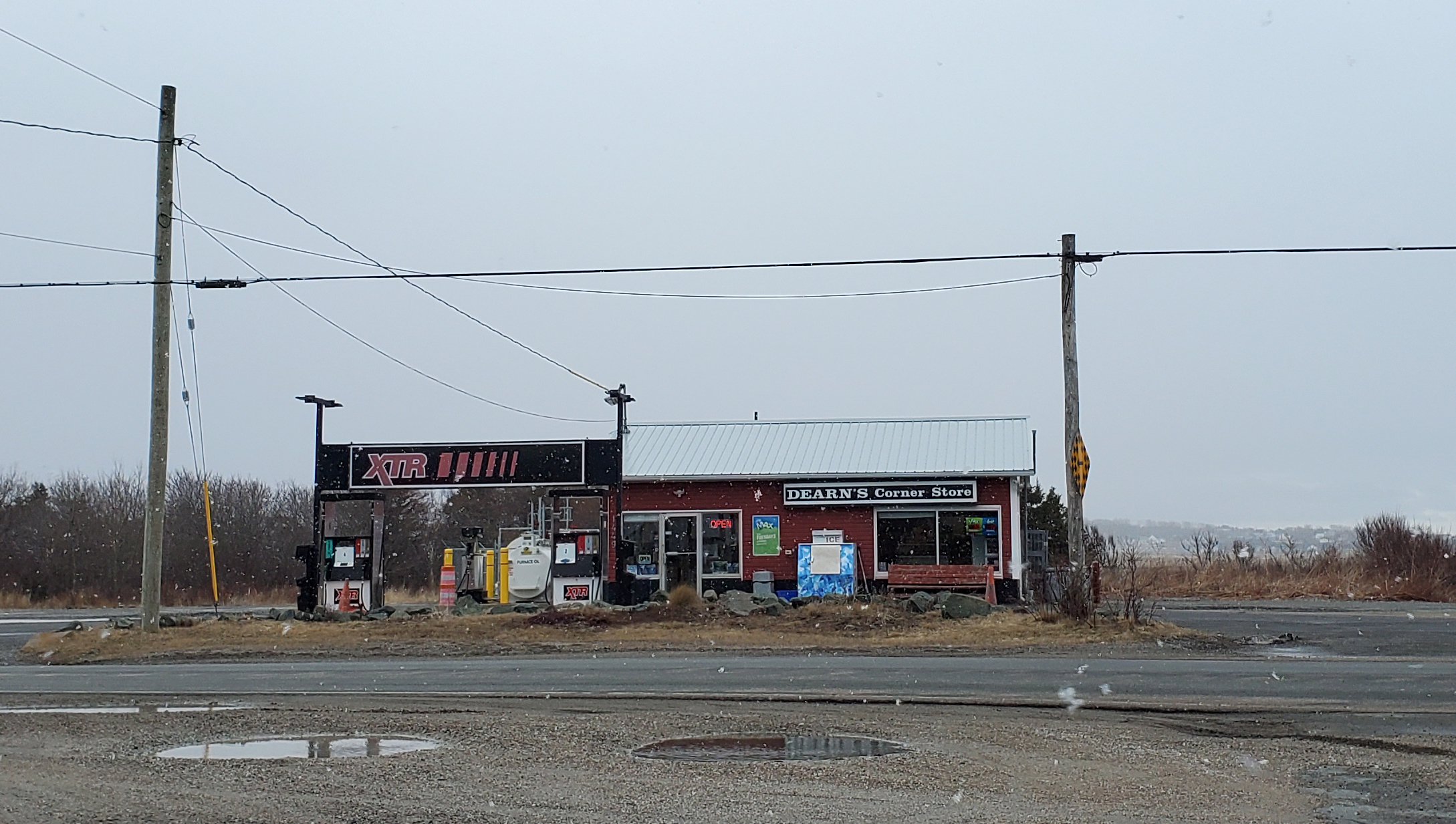
- Port Caledonia in 2022
- Interactive map of Port Caledonia

Port Caledonia in Nova Scotia

Port Caledonia (also known as Big Glace Bay) is a small community in the Canadian province of Nova Scotia, located in the Cape Breton Regional Municipality on Cape Breton Island. It is located on the Donkin Highway, between the town of Glace Bay and the village of Donkin.

It currently has one gas station/convenience store as well as a public beach, known as the Big Glace Bay Beach.

The community received media attention in 2011 when resident Shirley Sampson appeared on the reality television program Canada's Worst Driver 7, ultimately being named the worst driver in Canada.

== Demographics ==
In the 2021 Census of Population conducted by Statistics Canada, Port Caledonia had a population of 212 living in 92 of its 101 total private dwellings, a change of −0.9% from its 2016 population of 214. With a land area of 10.04 km^{2} (3.88 sq mi), it had a population density of 21.1/km^{2} (54.7/sq mi) in 2021.
