= Canada's Worst Driver 7 =

- Season 7
- No. of episodes: 8

Release
- Original network: Discovery Channel
- Original release: October 24 – December 13, 2011

Season chronology
- ← Previous; Canada's Worst Driver 6 Next → Canada's Worst Driver 8

Canada's Worst Driver 7 is the seventh season of the Canadian reality TV show Canada's Worst Driver, which aired on the Discovery Channel. As with previous years, eight people, nominated by their family or friends, enter the Driver Rehabilitation Centre to improve their driving skills. This season makes a particular emphasis on the uniquely Canadian nature of driving, rather than having any driving-related motifs as in past years. This year, the Driver Rehabilitation Centre is located at the Dunnville Airport in Dunnville, Ontario for the second straight season. The initial drive started in St. Catharines, Ontario and the final road test occurred in Hamilton, Ontario. This season is the first to be broadcast in high definition, owing to the launch of the high-definition simulcast of Discovery Channel. As part of the promotion for this season, a special Monday edition of The Alan Nursall Experience, a segment on Daily Planet (which normally airs on Tuesdays and Thursdays), takes a behind-the-scenes look at the Driver Rehabilitation Centre.

The Discovery Channel reported that it had received roughly 900 driver nominations for the show's seventh season. One of the drivers nominated was a driver who had difficulty with directions, whose family believed he relied too heavily on his phone's GPS system.

== Experts ==
Three experts return from Canada's Worst Driver 6, though Dr. Lauren Kennedy-Smith, psychologist from the past season, is not among them.

- Cam Woolley is the show's longest-serving expert, having been present in every season except the first and has seen the habits of Canadian drivers change drastically since 2000, with the most common offense having changed from DUI to distracted driving. He is the traffic expert on CP24 in Toronto and had a 25-year career as a traffic sergeant with the Ontario Provincial Police.
- Philippe Létourneau is a veteran high-speed driving instructor who counts BMW and Ferrari among his clients. Since joining the show in the third season, the average car has gained considerably in speed and acceleration, with the high-speed emphasis of this season making his job a particularly important one.
- Shyamala Kiru is an expert on interpersonal relationships and how they can cause emotional breakdowns in drivers. Her experiences have brought her to every corner of the globe.
- Peter Mellor is the show's head driving instructor, a position he has held since joining the show in the fifth season. With Peter returning for his third season, that ties him with Scott Marshall (the head instructor from the first three seasons of Canada's Worst Driver) as the longest-serving head instructor so far.

== Contestants ==
- Lauri Bencharski, 37, from Prince Albert, Saskatchewan, is an animal lover, but for her fiancé and nominator, Shaun, the animals prove to be a distractor while behind the wheel. She drives a white Dodge Ram and a silver Chrysler Intrepid and drove a grey Ford Five Hundred to the rehab centre.
- Aaron Cheshire, 30 and licensed for ten years, from Calgary, Alberta, is a former parking lot attendant involved in an accident in June 2005 due to a distracted driver. Despite recovery, he has struggled with confidence. His father and nominator, Lee, hopes that the Driver Rehabilitation Centre will be the last step towards total recovery. He drives a silver Smart Fortwo and drove a beige Mitsubishi Pajero to the rehab centre.
- Sly Grosjean, 40 and licensed for 17 years, from Lethbridge, Alberta (moved to Red Deer, Alberta; now lives in Edmonton, Alberta), is a technophile who excessively uses cell phone GPS for his job as a deliveryman. However, his brother-in-law and nominator, Fred Hillyer, believes that he is too reliant on new technologies. He drives a green Pontiac Grand Am and drove a blue Chevrolet Optra to the rehab centre.
- Afiya Lassy, 25, from Montreal, Quebec, struggles with road frustration; her family and her nominator, Cindy, are concerned that she has become a hazard on the road due to running red lights and not sharing the road. She drives a red Kia Rio and drove a beige Nissan Altima to the rehab centre.
- Tabitha "Tab" Parks, 39, from Calgary, Alberta, is a former school bus driver who is a uncomfortable behind the wheel. Her boyfriend, Matt, hopes that the Driver Rehabilitation Centre can help her conquer her fears. She drives a black Acura EL and drove a blue Ford Focus to the rehab centre.
- Jonathan "Jon" Parsons, 24 and licensed for eight years, from Bowmanville, Ontario (near Oshawa), has an arrogant attitude due to adrenaline brought on by driving. His concerned girlfriend and nominator, Elise, believes that this attitude will prove detrimental when she and him start a family. He drives a red Chevrolet Corvette.
- Benjamin "Ben" Reiman, 36, from Surrey, British Columbia (near Vancouver) believes that driving is becoming a major point of contention to their relationship—so much so that he and his wife and nominator, Jan, never drive together anymore. He drives a grey Hyundai Accent and drove a grey Ford Focus to the rehab centre.
- Shirley Sampson, 60 and licensed for 45 years, from Port Caledonia, Nova Scotia (on Cape Breton; now lives in Donkin, Nova Scotia), is a retired elementary school teacher who is comfortable driving around the small towns of rural Nova Scotia, only refusing to drive into Halifax where her daughter and nominator, Janis Wall, lives. She drives a grey Kia Rio5 and drove a red Ford Focus to the rehab centre.

== Synopsis ==
Contestant	1	2	3	4	5	6	7	8
Shirley Sampson	IN	IN	IN	IN	IN	IN	IN	CWD
Sly Grosjean	IN	IN	IN	IN	IN	IN	IN	RUNNER-UP
Aaron Cheshire	IN	IN	IN	IN	IN	IN	IN	OUT
Afiya Lassy	IN	IN	IN	IN	IN	IN	OUT	
Tab Parks	IN	IN	IN	IN	IN	OUT		
Ben Reiman	IN	IN	IN	OUT				
Lauri Bencharski	IN	IN	OUT					
Jon Parsons	IN	OUT						

(CWD) The contestant became Canada's Worst Driver.
(RUNNER-UP) The contestant was runner-up for Canada's Worst Driver.
(OUT) The contestant graduated.
(IN) The contestant was shortlisted for graduation.

== Episodes ==
No.	Title	Original release date
1	"Take Off, Eh!"	October 24, 2011
The Drive to Rehab: This season, the journey to the Driver Rehabilitation Centre starts from the Ontario Street Garage in St. Catharines, Ontario, with the eight drivers heading to rehab using a provided set of instructions, a journey that Andrew notes is an hour-long drive. The contestants depart in the following order: Shirley; Ben; Afiya; Sly; Tab; Aaron; Lauri, and; Jon.; Everyone commits several moving violations on the way to rehab; the contestants arrive in the following order: Ben; Shirley; Sly (whose habit of using his cell phone for directions would have cost him $155 had he been caught); Tab; Aaron; Afiya (pulled over by the camera crew for going 50 km/h over the limit and thus, given a ride the rest of the way); Jon (who would have been pulled over by a camera crew member for speeding and his car impounded for the excessive moving violations), and; Lauri.; Results: First to Arrive: Ben was the second to leave, but the first to arrive.; Last to Arrive: Lauri was the last.; Challenger Challenge - Basic Assessment: This year's featured car is a used 2009 Dodge Challenger RT (painted in a flag-inspired livery), to be used in one challenge per episode. Contestants will first turn the car around in a cross, before going down a short maneuvering course in reverse, turning the car around and performing a slalom at 50 km/h.; Afiya scratches the car and then loses control in the slalom.; Sly get the left side of the car pinned, resulting in the cross being widened; despite this, he still strikes several objects and speeds.; Lauri goes through the cross with minimal incident without her pets. After Andrew brings her four stuffed animals, however, her performance quality decreases.; Ben nearly knocks down the entire course, including the obstacles in the slalom.; Tab initially refuses to do the slalom at 50 km/h, but she is persuaded to do the challenge. Despite giving up on the reverse, she still strikes three obstacles on the slalom.; Jon's speed throughout the course results in multiple hits.; Shirley forgets to turn around in the cross, yet still strikes objects in forward during the reverse section. (At the slalom, she hits all of the obstacles.); Aaron is given coaching by his father, Lee, to get through the reverse. He ends the challenge by striking the second obstacle in the slalom.; When the experts interview the contestants, the experts question Tab on her anxiety, Ben on his relationship, Jon on humility, and Shirley on confidence.; Lauri, who has seen past seasons on the show, is quietly confident. Sly, on the other hand, is not as confident.; Afiya is ignorant as to why she was nominated.; Aaron becomes emotional when talking to the experts.; No one graduates this episode, as it serves merely as a skills evaluation.: The Alan Nursall Experience: Daily Planet correspondent Alan Nursall takes on the Trough, a challenge that has been featured in past years, which will also be used later on this season.
2	"Use Your Mirrors, Eh?"	October 31, 2011
The Rail Bridge: The annual "know where your wheels are" challenge has contestants cross a rail bridge in a Toyota RAV4. To encourage crossing in reverse, the course is initially set up with the rear wheels on the rails; Andrew demonstrates the challenge in reverse. Drivers only fail if they get the car stuck and unable to move.; Sly falls off going in reverse, then gets stuck.; Jon drives forward, doubtful of his reversing skills.; Ben doesn't look as he reverses, but manages to reverse across the bridge and into the finish sign.; Lauri and Shirley both choose to drive forward and pass.; Tab, with Andrew's help, manages to drive her way across forward.; Aaron tries in reverse; while trying to adjust his wheels, however, he gets stuck.; Although there is doubt about whether or not she passed, Afiya is able to get through the course without getting stuck.; Challenger Challenge - The Eye of the Needle: The first lesson from Philippe this year is on target fixation, which is tested in the annual challenge in the featured car. The five archways, which are not arranged in a line as in previous years, must be traversed at 60 km/h. Shirley gears up to 80 km/h and hits the driver's side in the second arch and the passenger side in the third and fifth arch.; Ben crashes into the first arch before accelerating to 90 km/h and colliding with the other arches.; Aaron slowly accelerates to 100 km/h after clearing the first arch, but he crashes into three of the next four arches.; Jon clears the arches easily.; Tab accelerates to 110 km/h and collides into four of the arches, having missed the third arch due to being unable to turn in time.; Lauri passes despite clipping the fourth arch.; Sly strikes all of the arches on the passenger side.; Afiya speeds to 110 km/h and clips her mirrors.; The Group Reverse Figure Eight: The contestants must reverse a Ford F-Series short bus (which can be driven by ordinary drivers as long as it has fewer than eight seats) around a figure-eight course. For this challenge, all of the contestants will be in the same car together as each contestants make their run.; Jon strikes seven objects as the first contestant to go due to excessive speed.; Ben, licensed to drive buses, strikes 29 objects and is left on the first turn after several minutes.; Tab, also licensed to drive full-sized buses, strikes 20 things in her run.; Afiya, ignoring her mirrors, strikes 59 obstacles in her run.; Shirley proceeds to do most of the rest of the course flawlessly after initial mistakes, with only 13 hits in her run.; Aaron goes through the course at minimal speed, even stopping when he is flustered by the crosstalk However, he ends up with only two hits in total.; Sly spends four minutes adjusting his mirrors; he subsequently relies on Jon for help.; Lauri is able to go through the course without a hit, helped by having an unobstructed view.; In deliberation: Ben admits he will not be the first to graduate.; Shirley and Tab both admit to needing more improvement. (Philippe believes that the root of Tab's problems is that she is looking not far enough ahead.); Afiya admits to graduation, with learning as an afterthought.; Lauri believes that she should be first to graduate, while thinking that she would benefit from rehab; she becomes emotional when discussing the risk of injury to her pets. (Cam suggests that she disable the passenger-side airbag and get specialized safety gear.); Jon wants to graduate, after a discussion with Aaron's life story. (Aaron, in return, is grateful for the news.); The experts are divided on Jon and Lauri being the first graduate: Cam and Philippe wants Jon to graduate based on his dealings with Aaron, while Andrew and Shyamala both want Lauri to go home because Lauri did better in all the challenges, leaving Peter with the deciding vote. In the end, the experts agree to honour Lauri's request to stick around and Jon becomes the first graduate.: The Alan Nursall Experience: Alan Nursall goes into the car maintenance garage at the Driver Rehabilitation Centre to assist mechanic Bill Hoffie in making quick fixes to the cars so that they will be ready for the next challenge. Among the repairs he assists is the replacement of side mirrors and the RAV4's shocks that were damaged from the Trough.
3	"Dangerous Driving"	November 7, 2011
Distracted Driving: The distracted driving lesson has been described in years past as "the easiest course of the year." This year, the contestants must drive in a Nash Canadian Statesman built in Toronto in 1954 on a racetrack course in order to demonstrate the dangers of distracted driving. Aaron, himself a victim of distracted driving, is exempt from this challenge; instead, after everyone else goes through their run, they must tell Aaron all about what they have learned from the challenge and how they will pledge to avoid creating more people like Aaron in the future. Shirley's run is focused on her eating and driving, while Afiya's is focused on texting while driving. While on her run, she slows down to walking speed but still hits the obstacles. Sly's run is also focused on both of the above, but he goes so far off course on his first lap that he destroys the engine. Lauri, already well aware of her issues with being distracted by her pets from the last episode, has makeup as the focus of her run. Ben's texting while driving is the focus of his run. The final run belongs to fellow Calgarian Tab, who believed that smoking, texting and eating while driving stick-shift can be done with enough training. She aborts the lesson early once she cannot handle the course and breaks down while talking to Aaron.; Reaction Time Exams: A series of exams are administered to test the reaction speeds of the contestants. The battery of tests consists of catching a falling stick, catching a dropped tennis ball from shoulder-height, and catching balls thrown from a tennis-ball machine. Lauri and Shirley have the fastest reaction times in the first test, Afiya and Tab do the best in the second test and Aaron, much to his surprise, is the best in the third test. Across all three tests, there is one common thread—Sly has not just the worst reaction time of the contestants, but reaction times vastly slower than the national average for a man of his age. Ben's reaction times are also noted to be rather slow, albeit not to nearly the same extent as Sly's.; The Head-to-Head S-Turn Challenge: In this challenge, using two Plymouth Horizons, contestants must use the S-turn to navigate in reverse into the centre of a spiral course before switching positions with the other car and going back out in reverse towards the other car's starting spot. Ben and Tab make up the first heat. Tab picks up the S-turn right away and reaches the centre without hitting anything, but for Ben, it takes longer for the lesson to take hold. Once the two pass each other, though, Ben pulls ahead and finishes ahead of Tab, who exhibits some mild road rage in frustration in the second half. Afiya takes on Lauri in the second heat. Lauri had never understood this before this lesson, but she finishes the course without hitting anything and ahead of Afiya. Afiya is unusually focused in her run, but her performance quickly degrades on the way out. The third match-up involves Aaron facing off against head driving instructor Peter. By the time Peter reaches the centre, Aaron must be slowly guided by Lee to the centre, having forgotten the lesson almost immediately. Andrew gets into the car to remind Aaron of how to do the S-turn and he goes through the second half unassisted without hitting anything. Shirley and Sly make up the final heat. Sly picks up the lesson quickly, but he barely gets moving. Both proceed to exceed the hit count of the other contestants combined before reaching the centre. Shirley gives up before reaching the centre and it takes Sly 88 minutes to reach the centre.; Challenger Challenge: The Shoulder-Check Challenge: After a posture lesson from Philippe, the annual challenge must be taken at 60 km/h. Contestants have up to two attempts to try and clear the course this year. Shirley passes easily on her first try. Aaron accelerates to 80 km/h in his first run and when he does his shoulder check, he takes one hand of the wheel when checking to the right (as if he's preparing to drive in reverse), takes an exit (which turned out to be the right one) and careens out of control for a long period after the exit is taken. After a bit more practice, he narrowly passes his second. In both of Sly's runs, he hits the lane obstacles as he prepares to take the correct exit. Lauri passes on her first try, despite temporarily going under speed. Afiya also passes on her first try. Tab also speeds to 80 km/h before taking the wrong exit (but clearing it) in her first run. She attributes the failure to panicking and she similarly panics in her second run, randomly guessing (correctly) an exit. Because she guessed, she fails. Ben accelerates to 90 km/h in his first run and hits the center marker. He also goes over speed in his second run, but he does clear the course.; In deliberation, Aaron doesn't want to graduate, if only to further make an impact on the other contestants. Afiya in particular is moved by Aaron. Tab, Lauri and Ben all feel that because of Aaron, they feel ready to graduate. Sly and Shirley are also moved by Aaron, but also vowed to stay. The experts make their deliberation short by granting Lauri, who only narrowly missed out on graduating in the previous episode on the grounds that she wanted to stay in rehab to learn more, the unanimous decision for graduation this episode.: The Alan Nursall Experience: Alan Nursall assists in setting up a parallel parking challenge as well as a parking lot challenge, both being parts of later episodes.
4	"Buckle Up"	November 14, 2011
The Trailer Challenge: With a normal driving license, a driver can tow a trailer 10 m (33 ft) long. In this challenge, contestants must tow such a trailer loaded with hay through an obstacle course with both short forward and reverse portions. Even with her nominator, Matt, helping her from outside the Dodge Ram 2500, Tab hits obstacles 26 times in her run. Aaron, battling the rain in his run, does not have an issue moving forwards, but he also needs his nominator, Lee, to help in reversing the trailer from the outside. When he fails to also get Andrew's help in reversing from the outside, he quits in frustration. Sly has trouble taking the forward turns wide enough in his run and he repeatedly turns in the wrong direction in reverse, for 29 hits total. Shirley also has trouble taking wide turns and quits even before finishing the forward portion. Afiya persists through 47 hits in her run, largely due to confusion over which direction to turn the wheel in reverse. Ben is unusually focused through the forward part of the run and, after reversing with speed, manages to finish his run without hitting anything. He credits his run with not having to perform the same action repeatedly.; The Three-Point Turn: In this challenge, contestants must perform a three-point turn in a Suzuki X-90 while on top of a raised platform. Tab only manages to do a nine-point turn. Aaron nearly falls off and does an 11-point turn while constantly getting input from Lee. Sly and Afiya also fall off the course. Shirley gets stuck after turning 21 points, but does manages to get out after a 31-point turn. Ben does a seven-point turn, after realizing that his initial entry (proceeding straight rather than turning) was erroneous.; The Water Tank Challenge: A Jeep Grand Wagoneer with 200 litres (53 US gal) of water is used for this annual challenge. The obstacle course this year consists of a slow portion, which includes a sudden stop to accommodate a reversing parked car, an acceleration to 30 km/h, a gradual deceleration and turn and then a slow bump that concludes the challenge. In Andrew's demonstration run, he loses 20 litres (5.3 US gal), mostly from the bump that has also soaked him in previous years. Sly doesn't brake at all in his run and collides into the reversing car. He proceeds to power his way forwards, not realizing that the hitting of obstacles has resulted in a flat front right tire heading into the acceleration portion. He loses 100 litres (26 US gal) in his run. Aaron also nearly collides into the car, losing control of the car as he powers forward. Like Sly before him, he also loses 100 litres (26 US gal), while Afiya loses 120 litres (32 US gal). Shirley only loses 35 litres (9.2 US gal) (the lowest amount other than Andrew's demonstration) and does not hit anything, only losing water at the bump. Tab goes through the course too fast, losing 90 litres (24 US gal) in her run. Ben loses 50 litres (13 US gal) in his run, all from intentionally soaking Jan in the beginning of the run; when he drives seriously through the acceleration portion and thereafter, he does not lose a single drop, even on the hump and even as he goes over speed (35 km/h) on the acceleration portion.; Challenger Challenge: The Reverse Flick: In this challenge, contestants must perform the reverse flick inside a confined space. Tab, originally so nervous she freaked out as the technique was being demonstrated, has a slight turn when reversing the car, hitting the entrance obstacles in most of her five attempts. Aaron turns the wheel too many times through his first four runs and needed Andrew's help in his fifth run; even then, he steers too far. Afiya brakes through her first three runs and plows into the foam barriers. She passes on her fifth run. On Shirley's first run, she doesn't attempt the turn until she is at the exit. Frustrated, Janis leaves the car and Andrew takes her place. Shirley passes on her third attempt after a near miss in her second run. Sly, who has a nonverbal learning disorder, is given written instructions for his run. He hits the brake in his first three runs. He is too frustrated and barely turns at all in his fourth attempt, but before his final attempt, the rain sets in. Forced to do a slower 30 km/h reverse instead of a 40 km/h reverse, he passes on his last attempt. Ben oversteers in his first three runs and tries to brake to compensate. He flicks too early in his fourth run and he flicks slightly too far in the opposite direction in his last attempt, failing the challenge.; In deliberation, Tab wants to stay to aid in her emotions, while Aaron does not feel that he warrants graduation. Afiya, Sly and Shirley also do not want to graduate. Ben, however, wants to graduate, having learned many things about his original licensing process, which included settling on the cheapest driving school available and being a class clown rather than focusing on fundamentals. Because only one contestant wanted to graduate, the experts debate whether they should graduate Ben: Cam and Shyamala feel that he should stay, while Philippe and Peter feel that he should graduate, leaving Andrew to cast the deciding vote and ultimately, in a 3-2 split decision (Peter and Phillipe backing Ben and Shyamala and Cam not backing anyone), Ben's vow to replace his stick-shift car with an automatic turns the tide in his favour and he becomes the next graduate, once again ensuring that there will not be three men in the finale.
5	"Park and Slide"	November 21, 2011
Canada's Worst Parking Lot: This challenge is only done once every two years. This year, contestants must park into the spaces by reversing. Initially, no spaces are available and spaces will only open up as blocker cars move out. Aaron is the first to be penalized with a lap when he suddenly stops in the parking lot (as advised by Lee) and Shirley is penalized when Janis takes her steering wheel; no other penalties were assessed for the rest of the challenge. Aaron is the first to park after a brief encounter with a blocking cube truck and initially trying to give up the space; the cube truck is unable to park in the space and promptly moves out, prompting Aaron to try again. Sly is the second to park, though he is initially unsure as to whether he is between the lines until he stops. Tab is third to park, though she was "shaking somewhat" through her run. The last space is claimed by Afiya when she beats Shirley to the vacated space.; Parallel Parking: After a lesson on parallel parking (Sly getting written instructions as requested), the contestants must park a 1967 Chrysler Newport into a space. Contestants have 30 minutes to park and must make only one parking attempt per trip through the course. Tab eventually passes in five attempts. Afiya demands silence and, despite getting out of her seat to check the passenger side as she is reversing, passes on her first try. Andrew observes Sly from the backseat throughout his run; Sly spends two minutes to recognize where the wheels are and another eight minutes to reverse, only to end up too far from the curb. He runs out of time and fails. Aaron repeatedly solicits Lee's advice, but though the advice is well-meaning, Aaron fails each attempt. When he demands silence, Aaron succeeds after two additional attempts. Similarly, Shirley solicits Janis' advice. On Shirley's final attempt before running out of time, Janis adamantly refuses to assist her mother despite repeated solicitations and Shirley passes as a result.; Best Performer: Afiya, as it took only one attempt for her to parallel park properly.; Worst Performer: Sly is the only person to fail this challenge.; The Trough: The annual challenge consists of a simple course with two turns using the Toyota RAV4. Contestants will have 30 minutes to go through the course. Janis is repeatedly fed up with her mother's solicitation and Shirley fails. Aaron passes on his last attempt before running out of time, again demanding silence from Lee after being given bad advice in every previous run. Tab inches along in each run, but due to Matt's bad advice, Tab banishes him from the vehicle. She makes the first turn but fails the second as a result and runs out of time. Afiya repeatedly falls off the course and though she wants to quit after 20 minutes, she is convinced to go the entire 30 minutes. She fails on the last turn in her last attempt. Sly, in an ill-fated attempt to "gun it" through the second turn, causes severe damage to the underside of the SUV, ripping out the exhaust manifold and puncturing the fuel line when the rear wheel hops the rails. Tearing a hole in the RAV4's gas line was considered to have been impossible by the show's vehicle maintenance crew and the challenge is thus aborted.; Best Performer: Aaron is the only person to pass this challenge, thanks mainly due to demanding silence from Lee.; Worst Performer: While everyone else ran out of time, Sly was deemed the worst, as his ill-fated "gun-it" decision caused severe damage to the car.; Challenger Challenge: Icy Corner: After a lesson on collision avoidance, the icy corner must be tackled at 50 km/h. Contestants have three attempts at the corner before failing. Sly releases the brake too late and hits the wall in all three attempts. After this, Andrew voices his opinion that Sly's driving is showing no signs of improvement and that he should seriously consider giving up driving permanently, a point which Andrew would continue to make until the end of the season. Tab goes over-speed (at 60 km/h) during all three runs and hits the wall each time. Afiya brakes too soon and takes up the tarp in her first attempt and hits the wall in her other two attempts. Shirley also pulls up the tarp too soon in her second attempt and in all three attempts, she does not release the brake and hit the wall. As for Aaron, he passes on his first try.; Best Performer: Aaron is the only one who passes this challenge.; Worst Performer: While everyone else hit the wall due to braking too soon, Sly was the only one to brake too late.; In deliberation, Afiya apologizes to Andrew for cursing at him after failing the Trough. Cam reprimands Sly for "gunning it" during the Trough, while Shirley is confident that she deserves to graduate. Tab also feels confident in graduating even though she went over-speed in the icy corner. Aaron, the consensus best performer in the episode, believes that he also deserves to graduate based on his performance, but he would rather stay put, as he believes his moment has not arrived. Shirley and Tab are shortlisted by the experts, but Andrew is not confident in graduating either of them. As a result, no one graduates this episode.
6	"Hard!"	November 28, 2011
At the start of the episode, Andrew recalls an incident where a contestant on Canada's Worst Driver's Dutch counterpart, De Allerslechtste Chauffeur van Nederland (The Netherlands' Worst Driver), injured host Ruben Nicolai—Andrew's Dutch counterpart—and a cameraman during its Shoulder Check Challenge (the contestant, later identified only as Pim, mistook the gas pedal for the brake, closed his eyes and let go of the wheel) and how it has put him on edge (Canada's Worst Driver 7 was filmed as the Dutch series was airing in the Netherlands). The episode also opens with Tab and Afiya seeking help from Shyamala between episodes to address both Tab's driving anxiety and Afiya's lack of taking on responsibility.: The Snowplow Challenge: A Dodge Ram outfitted with a snowplow is used for this challenge. Contestants must proceed forward through a short course at 20 km/h (with wood chips being used in place of snow) without hitting any of the parked cars at the side of the course. Contestants have 30 minutes to attempt the course. Shyamala's counseling pays off, with Tab passing the challenge after seven minutes and Afiya after 17 attempts. Sly continues to be unaware that he hits things in his attempts; it is only when he looks far ahead that he passes (he had also sped up to 25 km/h in his successful run). Aaron is not confident going up to speed and even under speed, he hits things due to the lack of looking far ahead. However, Aaron slowly begins to speed up, but it's too late, as time runs out before he can get off a successful run. As with previous challenges, Janis refuses to assist Shirley through her run despite her soliciting advice; Janis' refusal to help also pays off, as forced to make her own decisions, Shirley passes.; Best Performer: While everyone but Aaron passes, Tab's counseling session with Shyamala allows her to pass after seven minutes.; Worst Performer: Aaron is the only person to fail this challenge, mainly due to his lack of speed.; Rules of the Road Test: Peter administers a quick 10-question road sign test to the contestants on rules of the road, with a special emphasis on road rules specific to various parts of Canada; such as regulations around right turn on red in Montreal (where Afiya is from; the only part of Canada where it is illegal, owing to unique safety issues) and stopping behind Toronto's streetcars (which do not stop curbside, meaning cars must stop behind a streetcar when its doors are open to allow passengers a safe place to embark and disembark from the sidewalk). While most of the other nominees' scores are not known, Shirley is the worst, scoring 1/10 largely on the back of outdated knowledge.; Car Curling: As curling is a popular sport in Canada, this challenge is inspired by the amateur pastime. A Buick Skylark is used for this challenge. Contestants must push a large "rock" with the car and brake before reaching a "hog line," while the momentum of the rock carries it into a "house." The contestant closest to "the button" wins. Contestants have eight rocks to try to push into the house. In Shirley's attempts, she never gets comfortable getting up to speed without losing control of the rock and she only gets two rocks to the hog line, both of which promptly stop a few feet past the line. Sly loses control in six of his eight rocks before reaching the hog line and doesn't place any of the rocks in the house. In contrast, Afiya starts quickly and accelerates so fast, all of her rocks sail through the house; none of her eight rocks actually land within the house. Aaron also loses control of his rocks early on and his timid driving and over-correcting for his errors does not get him any of his eight rocks in the house. Tab wins the competition when her first rock sails into the "four-foot" in the house.; Best Performer: Tab is the only person to pass this challenge.; Worst Performer: Shirley, as she goes way too slow to get most of her "rocks" to reach the "hog line."; Challenger Challenge: Swerve and Avoid: The challenge is themed around avoiding moose on the road. This is a particular issue for Shirley, who has killed family pets due to not swerving to avoid them. In this year's version, contestants must clear the course at 70 km/h in the Challenger. Tab accelerates to 80 km/h and in trying to slow down, she does not have enough time to get back down and hits the barriers, destroying the front bumper. In her second attempt, she swerves too wide and destroys the back bumper. Tab does, however, clear the course in her third attempt. Aaron passes the challenge on his first try. Shirley swerves too early in her first two runs and hits the last lane marker. She clears the course in the third attempt. Afiya fails the course, as she goes over-speed and hits the moose in her first run. She swerves too early in the second attempt and too late in the third. Sly accelerates to 100 km/h and goes straight ahead and brakes, destroying the centre of the course. The challenge is aborted then as Andrew remarks that he could not have done the challenge any worse.; Best Performer: Aaron, who passes on his first try.; Worst Performer: Even though Afiya oversped on her first run and swerved either too early or too late on her two subsequent run, Sly was deemed the worst for destroying the centre of the course, causing the challenge to be aborted.; The experts commend Tab and Shirley on their improved behaviour and both claim that they deserve to graduate. However, Afiya admits to being overconfident when she entered rehab and the realization of the true nature of her driving skills means that she is not ready to graduate. As for Aaron, he feels that his moment has still not arrived. Sly admits to not making any ground so far through rehabilitation. Cam believes that Tab should be the graduate while Philippe still has an issue with Tab driving too fast, so he endorses Shirley. For the second time in three episodes, Andrew is left with the deciding vote and, in another 3-2 split decision (this time, with Philippe and Shyamala backing Shirley and Peter and Cam backing Tab), Tab becomes the next graduate, as Shirley's driving was still too inconsistent for the experts' tastes.
7	"Glazed Over"	December 5, 2011
At the start of the show, Andrew comments on the destruction of 14 cameras of various qualities from challenges over the previous six episodes.: The Maze: The contestants must drive in a tight concrete box forwards, around a sharp turn and into a widened turnaround bay where the contestants must turn all the way around and drive out the way they came. The challenge car is a Plymouth Horizon. In Aaron's run, he has a minor incident in the in-turn and it causes him to rely on Lee throughout his run; though it does not stop him from backing the car into the concrete barriers during the turnaround. Sly drives right into the wall in the opening turn and in trying to make the turn, he scrapes the side of the car. By the time Sly reaches the turnaround, he, too, relies on Fred to get him out of trouble. Afiya's run is better, never once relying on Cindy and hitting only three things in the turn, though, like the others, she hits the corner trying to make the turn. Shirley relies on the inside corner as a pivot point going in and Janis eventually relents and helps her through the turnaround.; Best Performer: Even though no one passed this challenge, Afiya did hit less things than everyone else, thanks mainly to not once relying on Cindy.; Worst Performer: Even though Shirley scraped the car more than everyone else and Janis finally helped her through the turnaround, Sly hit the first wall in the front and repeatedly scraped the side door with the barrier.; Drifting Doughnuts: After the annual lesson on how to do "drifting doughnuts" is taught, the task must be repeated inside a confined space in a Ford Mustang GT (with dye in the rear tires to produce red smoke). Shirley tries to finish after slowly driving in a circle, before spinning out of control repeatedly. In one attempt, she is so fixated by the boxes on the outside of the course (rather than on the road in trying to find the exit), she drives into them and does not stop until after the car is well into the fields. She never manages to do the doughnut. Afiya, described as the best in lessons, often counter steers too early; and in her run, she fails to do the doughnut. Aaron has a tendency to hit the central marker (a maple leaf) due to target fixation and he too does not manage to do the doughnut. Sly initially only manages to repeatedly drive in circles, prompting Cam to suggest that Sly is a guarantee for the final three. When he does manages to spin the car out, like Aaron, he repeatedly hits the central marker.; Best Performer: Even though Afiya failed, she was given credit for understanding the lesson.; Worst Performer: Aaron, Sly and Shirley, who either hit the wall or the leaf and never once came close to passing.; Challenger Challenge: The Reverse Slalom: A simple reverse slalom must be attempted in 30 seconds or less. As with previous challenges, the faces of the nominators are on some of the foam figures. Contestants have 10 attempts to do this challenge. Shirley exceeds the time limit in her first attempt without hitting anything, but she hits obstacles in the rest of her attempts. Afiya is always on pace to finish in terms of time, but she either spins out past the last obstacle—Afiya once blaming a failed attempt on Cindy's countdown distracting her—or hits the last obstacle in each of her runs. Aaron also reverses wildly out of control in his attempts and fails to finish. Sly's condition prevents him from trying to drive backwards reliably and in his run, he sometimes turns so wide that he goes off of the course and misses some of the turns. He, too, does not finish.; The Beer Truck: The contestants must drive a large beer truck around a "circle of frustration" and a pillar of rims, before entering a forward and reverse obstacle course towards a loading dock. Aaron is frustrated not by the circle of frustration, but the reverse portion of the course—and for good reason, as it takes him 13 minutes for the circle and forward sections and 19 minutes for the reverse. Fred is warned to not advise Sly in any way through his run. Sly hits the pillar and the challenge is aborted when the truck gets stuck atop some of the overturned rims. Afiya only hits one thing around the circle of frustration, though not the pillar of rims. Afiya remains focused through the reverse (even through hitting things), finishing in 27 minutes. Shirley quits the challenge even before she drives into the circle of frustration.; Through some of the challenges, Fred had been contemplating whether Sly would have been better off quitting driving altogether, a sentiment also echoed by Andrew after the Beer Truck Challenge. Sly cannot defend his performance in any of the challenges and admits that he is bound for the final three. Shirley also admits being bound for the final three as well. Aaron also wants to be in the final three, if only to prove himself on the only test that matters to him—the final drive in Hamilton. Afiya admits to progress during this episode and it is enough for the experts to unanimously agree to graduate her. However, Andrew is still unconvinced, as he believes that she is still a pathological liar who tells the experts what they want to hear and believes that this year's final challenges should have four contestants instead of the usual three, something that, luckily for Afiya, none of the experts agree with him on. Nevertheless, Andrew gives in to peer pressure from the experts and assents to graduating Afiya, who becomes the season's penultimate graduate, sending Aaron into the finale with Shirley and Sly.
8	"Oh Canada"	December 12, 2011
Straight-Line Reversal: The opening challenge has all three contestants in the same car as they attempt to reverse in a straight line through a straight hallway in 20 seconds or less; contestants have ten attempts to do the challenge before failing it outright. The challenge car is the 1967 Chrysler Newport used in the parallel parking challenge. Aaron volunteers to go first, but in his first attempt, he barely goes one car length before his 20 seconds expire and he finishes his first attempt in five minutes after hitting things. Aaron is distracted by Sly in most of his subsequent attempts and is unable to finish. Shirley (the only female nominee remaining after Afiya graduated last episode) passes on her first attempt after 19 seconds. Sly collides with many of the obstacles in a horrific manner in each of his first eight attempts, only stabilizing somewhat in his last two; nevertheless, he still hits things and is unable to finish in 10 attempts.; Best Performer: Shirley, who passed on her first attempt, with a second to spare.; Worst Performer: Even though Aaron took five minutes on his first attempt and was distracted by Sly in most of his subsequent attempts, Sly was the worst, as he scraped and hit the Newport with either another vehicle or an obstacle, mostly in a horrific manner.; Challenger Challenge: The Mega-Challenge: The annual challenge begins with a 50 km/h slalom, before dropping to 40 km/h into an icy corner and then through a forward obstacle course, into a doughnut, through another obstacle course in both forward and reverse. The drivers must then go through an Eye of the Needle in reverse, before finishing with a Reverse Flick. Aaron fails the Slalom by taking the turns too wide and is a little late in the Icy Corner (though he does not hit the wall, he does go off the course in making the turn). He has no significant problems in any of the obstacle courses or the reverse Eye of the Needle (though he fails the doughnut) and makes his Reverse Flick attempt too early. In his run, Sly goes too fast in the Slalom and goes off the course entirely. He recovers in time to attempt the Icy Corner, but goes through the wall. His doughnut attempt is not shown, but he collides with things in both the forward and reverse obstacles. His reverse Eye of the Needle goes well, up until hitting the last arch. He is unable to properly perform the Reverse Flick. Shirley does a flawless Slalom in her run and nearly makes the Icy Corner while going at 50 km/h. She turns in the opposite direction too early in the doughnut and does not hit anything in the obstacle courses; the rest of her hits were all from hitting the arches in the reverse Eye of the Needle. She finishes by performing a perfect Reverse Flick.; Best Performer: Aaron and Shirley, with Shirley hitting seven objects and passing four components and Aaron hitting four objects and passing three.; Worst Performer: Sly, who not only hit 11 objects, but failed every component.; Road Test: Drivers must navigate a course involving 30 turns through Hamilton in a 1966 Ford Mustang convertible, with the beginning and ending at Sam Lawrence Park, since the Challenger is no longer road-worthy. Shirley is confused through the streets of Hamilton, with a particular trouble in dual-turn lanes (intending to turn in the outside turn lane but eventually going straight through on two occasions) and stopping in pedestrian crosswalks (which she does throughout her run). She is even caught going down the wrong way down both King William Street in front of a police vehicle and John Street North up a blind hill on the left side of a double yellow line. When trying to merge onto the Chedoke Expressway at Longwood Road South, she stops in the merge lane and once she gets into the middle lane of the highway, she goes too slow—so much so that she is unable to make her exit due to traffic on both adjacent lanes going faster. Her run finishes with 26 moving violations (the most of any nominee) totaling $2,860 in fines (the highest of any nominee). Sly is ultimately confused by trying to find the right turn and on numerous occasions, he stops in the middle of the intersection trying to read the crossing street signs. There were no major incidents once on the highway and Sly even reflects on his own driving behaviour after a passing driver tries to take a picture of their car with a cell phone. In Aaron's run, he starts by running a stop sign (ironic as it was ultimately the cause of his hospitalization six years earlier) and his composure comes crashing down when a police car suddenly blares its siren behind him. However, as the police car passes by, his driving becomes much better, with no problems in the rest of his run, which earns a round of applause from the experts.; Best Performer: Aaron and Sly, despite Aaron running through a stop sign and Sly stopping through an intersection, but the two of them doing relatively well.; Worst Performer: Shirley, who committed 26 moving violations and ended up costing a total of $2,860 (the highest infraction cost ever).; After a somber farewell to the Challenger (complete with a mock funeral ceremony), the experts give their final opinion. Sly admits that the road test was more comfortable than any of the challenges, but he was ultimately on edge through the test. The opposite happened for Shirley—good challenge performances but a horrible Road Test. Aaron admits that after the Road Test, he finally got everything and more out of rehab. In their final discussion, the experts immediately agree that while he still has some way to go, Aaron is not Canada's Worst Driver as, despite his composure crashing down when a police car suddenly blared its siren behind him, he improved the most. As for the remaining two, Philippe and Peter judge Sly to be Canada's Worst Driver due to his performance in the challenges, while Cam and Andrew judge Shirley as such, feeling that even though Sly stopped in the middle of an intersection on numerous occasions during his Road Test, Shirley was disastrous on hers, leaving Shyamala with the deciding vote, which swings in Sly's favour as, despite performing the worst in the Straight-Line Reversal Challenge and the Mega Challenge, the fact that Sly is considered to be able to drive away on his own, while Shirley isn't, means that Shirley is named Canada's Worst Driver and becomes the seventh person (fourth woman) to be awarded the trophy. However, Andrew tells Sly that, despite avoiding being named the worst, he has absolutely nothing to be proud about and Fred agrees, saying that Sly simply got lucky that Shirley happened to perform so poorly on the Road Test. Despite ultimately being named the worst, Shirley still leaves with parting words of encouragement from Andrew, who implores her to continue driving and, as a special mark of respect for doing so well, allows Janis to drive Shirley home instead of the usual final humiliation of being forced to catch a plane or limousine while her car is towed all the way back to her hometown.
