= Canada's Worst Driver 6 =

- Season 6
- Canada's Worst Driver 6 logo
- No. of episodes: 8

Release
- Original network: Discovery Channel
- Original release: October 25 – December 13, 2010

Season chronology
- ← Previous; Canada's Worst Driver 5 Next → Canada's Worst Driver 7

Canada's Worst Driver 6 is the sixth season of the Canadian reality TV show Canada's Worst Driver, which aired on the Discovery Channel. As with previous years, eight people, nominated by their family or friends, entered the Driver Rehabilitation Centre to improve their driving skills. This year, the Driver Rehabilitation Centre is located at the Dunnville Airport, a registered aerodrome in Dunnville, Ontario that has since ceased airport operations.

For this season, a new series logo was commissioned, coinciding with an increase in the teaching of the fundamentals of High Performance Driving in the lessons this year (although the logo from Seasons 1-5 was used in the opening and all commercial outros). The initial drive started in Hamilton, Ontario and the final road test occurred in Niagara Falls, Ontario.

== Experts ==
Three experts return from Canada's Worst Driver 5, though Dr. Louisa Gembora, psychologist for the past three seasons, is not among them.

- Cam Woolley is the show's longest-serving expert, having been present in every season except the first and has seen the habits of Canadian drivers change drastically since 2000, with the most common offense having changed from DUI to distracted driving. He is the traffic expert on CP24 in Toronto and had a 25-year career as a traffic sergeant with the Ontario Provincial Police.
- Philippe Létourneau is a veteran high-speed driving instructor who counts BMW and Ferrari among his clients. Since joining the show in the third season, the average car has gained considerably in speed and acceleration, with the high-speed emphasis of this season making his job a particularly important one.
- Dr. Lauren Kennedy-Smith is a professional psychotherapist who has also moonlighted as a race car driver and entertainer.
- Peter Mellor is in his second season as the show's head driving instructor. With Peter returning for his second season, that makes his predecessor, Canada's Worst Driver 4 head instructor Dan Bagyan, the shortest-serving head instructor so far.

== Contestants ==
- Diane Akers, 49 and licensed for 32 years, from Edmonton, Alberta, is a suburbanite who is uncomfortable driving anywhere past 5 km (3.1 mi) from her home—a comfort radius that quickly degenerates to nothing under inclement conditions. It's gotten so bad, one of her six children, Raeanne (known for her "Canada, this is the woman that made you late for work" comment in the audition video), is staging an intervention on her behalf. She drives a blue Pontiac Montana and drove a blue Dodge Caravan to the rehab centre.
- Jamie Giberson, 25 and licensed for six years, from Hampton, New Brunswick (near Saint John), has been traumatized by fear after hitting an elderly couple early in her driving career. Her fear has caused her to fail a driving exam four times, and she often blames her bad driving on her newlywed husband, Eric. She drives a silver Oldsmobile Intrigue and drove a grey Ford Five Hundred to the rehab centre.
- Bradley "Brad" Hengerer, 34, from Springbank, Alberta (near Calgary), is a grocery store clerk who has been banned from driving by his wife and nominator, Donna, as well as his father-in-law, Gil Masson, due to an escalating pile of accidents and tickets. He enters rehab out of necessity, as Gil's health is failing following a recent heart attack and Donna has lost the use of her right arm following a farming accident in 2003, forcing Brad to take up driving once again. He drives a red Pontiac Sunfire GT and drove a white Chevrolet Impala to the rehab centre.
- Lance Morin, 27 and licensed for four months, from Ottawa, Ontario, is a fashionista whose driving history goes further back, as he had been caught driving unlicensed with an uninsured car when he was 16. In the 11 years since, though, he had been a nervous wreck behind the wheel despite diligently awaiting the day that he would be fully licensed. He is nominated by his best friend, Gilles Proulx, a parking enforcement officer. He drives a silver Chevrolet Cobalt and drove a black Ford Focus to the rehab centre.
- Dale Pitton, 62 and licensed for over 30 years, from St. Catharines, Ontario, is a social worker, hostess, mother of two and grandmother of four who desires to learn, but no one around her has a desire to drive with her... and for good reason, as she has amassed an escalating accident record, including an occasion where she hit a police car as she was being ticketed. One of her nephews, John, was one of six people who nominated her. She drives a blue Chevrolet Cavalier.
- Scott Schurink, 25, from Chestermere, Alberta (near Calgary), is a speed addict who loves to weave in and out of traffic on busy highways going at 150 km/h. He is also a drunk and has spent time in prison numerous times for possession with intent to traffic. As such, he has had his license suspended seven times and has owned over 60 cars. His roommate, Danny Bridgman, wants him to adopt the proper rules of the road, especially since he is driving on Danny's insurance due to the prohibitive cost of $15,000 that it would entail to insure himself. He drives a black Nissan Maxima and drove a beige Nissan Altima to the rehab centre.
- Dean Sibanda, 33, from Saint-Laurent, Quebec (on Montreal Island) (originally from Zimbabwe), is yet to be accustomed to driving in Canada since immigrating in 2001—even basic knowledge such as the meaning of stop signs elude him. His friend and nominator, Brian Glenzitoe, has known him for the nine years he has been in Canada. He drives a gray Nissan Altima and drove a green Nissan Sentra to the rehab centre.
- Paul Thurston, 54, from Collingwood, Ontario (near Barrie), has never been comfortable with anything on four wheels, an oddity for a former stunt motorcyclist who once jumped 15 cars on his bike. He has a hatred of cars after losing five friends in bike/car collisions, but he is motivated to drive a car after finally realizing that riding a bike in the middle of winter is unsafe. His biker buddy, Tommy Bettles, will be accompanying him to rehab. He drives a white GMC Conversion Van and rode his motorcycle, along with Tommy, to the rehab centre.

== Synopsis ==
Contestant	1	2	3	4	5	6	7	8
Lance Morin	IN	IN	IN	IN	IN	IN	IN	CWD
Dale Pitton	IN	IN	IN	IN	IN	IN	IN	RUNNER-UP
Brad Hengerer	IN	IN	IN	IN	IN	IN	IN	OUT
Jamie Giberson	IN	IN	IN	IN	IN	IN	OUT	
Dean Sibanda	IN	IN	IN	IN	IN	OUT		
Diane Akers	IN	IN	IN	IN	OUT			
Paul Thurston	IN	IN	IN	OUT				
Scott Schurink	IN	EXPL						

(CWD) The contestant became Canada's Worst Driver.
(RUNNER-UP) The contestant was runner-up for Canada's Worst Driver.
(OUT) The contestant graduated.
(IN) The contestant was shortlisted for graduation.
(EXPL) The contestant was expelled.
^1 Non-Elimination Week, due to all contestants wanting to remain at the Driver Rehabilitation Centre.

== Episodes ==
No.	Title	Original release date
1	"Ready, Set, Go!"	October 25, 2010
The Drive to Rehab: This season, the journey to the Driver Rehabilitation Centre starts from Heddle Marine Service in Hamilton, Ontario, with the eight drivers heading to rehab using a provided set of instructions, a journey that Andrew notes is an hour-long drive. The contestants depart in the following order: Paul, the first contestant to head to rehab on a motorcycle; Lance; Diane; who travels so slowly, she causes a traffic jam; Dale; Brad; Jamie; Dean, and; Scott.; Most of the drivers make a large number of moving violations on the way to rehab; the contestants arrive in the following order: Dale, Brad, Diane, Lance, Scott (who committed 37 moving violations), Jamie, Paul and Dean (who also drove 50 km/h over the speed limit). Dean and Scott are the first contestants in the history of Canada's Worst Driver not to complete the drive to the rehab centre.: First to Arrive: Dale was the fourth to leave, but the first to arrive.; Last to Arrive: Dean was the last.; Camaro Challenge - Basic Assessment: In response to complaints about vintage used cars being demolished in previous seasons, a brand new Chevrolet Camaro is commissioned for this season, to be used in one challenge per episode and sold after the season ends. The challenge, mostly identical to that of the previous season, consists of a reversing course made of concrete barriers with one foot of space on either side, followed by a 50 km/h slalom before stopping in front of a wall.; Paul, going first, causes damage in the reverse and spins out on the slalom.; Diane and Dale continue rapidly devaluing the car; neither makes it to the full 50 km/h. **Lance gets the Camaro stuck on a stack of hubcaps in the first turn, never arriving to the end of the challenge.; Donna's frustration during the reverse portion means that Brad has to stop and take a break for her sake.; Dean speeds his way through the slalom, but stops well short of the wall.; Jamie inflicts the most damage on the Camaro, ripping off the entire front bumper through contact with a concrete barrier.; Scott, going last, shows off prior to the challenge, making a perfect reverse run. However, he demonstrates why he is in rehab when he shows off a handbrake turn before attempting the slalom. He then forgets to release the handbrake, ruining an otherwise perfect run.; Results: Best Performer: Scott, who completed the first two sections of the challenge with no trouble, and only failed the third by carelessly leaving the handbrake on.; Worst Performer: Lance, whose anxiety caused him to give up halfway through the first section. Of the drivers who managed to complete the challenge, Jamie did the worst, by tearing off the Camaro's front bumper in the concrete barriers and then hitting every obstacle in the slalom.; In the deliberation, each contestant meets with the experts for a personal discussion on why they are here. No one graduates this episode, as it serves merely as a skills evaluation. Web extras for this episode: Bad Passengers - Andrew reflects on the nature of the nominator after five years. He claims that in the first few years, people were usually nominated by their loved ones out of spite, while in later years, the desire to have their loved ones improve has taken over. Nominations have increased from 100 in the first year to 500 this year. He also talks about nominators who act as "backseat drivers," generally out of affection for their nominees. He recommends that being a calming influence will help their nominees become better and that one challenge on the show may turn out to be two challenges—one for the nominee and one for the nominator.; Viewer Mailbag - As with Canada's Worst Handyman 5, Andrew takes time to answer questions submitted by viewers prior to the start of the season. On why nominees are allowed to leave rather than adopting the Canada's Worst Handyman format and have everyone stay the entire length of the series, Andrew states that eliminating nominees allows them to have more contestants (eight versus five) and the limited amount of education that could be provided on CWD compared to the wide range of skills that can be taught in CWH.; Bad Drivers - Philippe, who admitted that this was the first year that he nearly vomited while teaching the contestants their skills, talks about the extensive preparation needed for the show needed by everyone on the crew. Despite the fact that this is his fourth year on the show, he still feels as if he is unprepared. He talks about a greater emphasis on high-speed challenges (having to drive up to 80 km/h for some challenges, which had not been done since the second season, before he first joined the show) this year, owing to the number of contestants who are not confident behind the wheel or are otherwise unskilled. Philippe also mentions that, in the upcoming teeter-totter challenge (first seen in the third season but taken from the fourth season), five cars were used for the challenge, prompting Philippe to suggest that each contestant should get their own challenge car in the future.; Challenge Links - The crew of the Canada's Worst Driver series take a behind-the-scenes look at the "Challenge Link," the short introductory pieces done by Andrew before every challenge. Links are also done for each episode (as the show's cold opening) as well as the season itself (as the cold opening for the first episode).; Sound for the Show - Tobin Mills, sound director of the series (and one of the few crew members other than Andrew who has been with the show since the first season), explains his behind-the-scenes role in the show and how his role has evolved over the years.; New Car - Andrew goes into further detail on viewer complaints that vintage cars were being destroyed for the show by the contestants in past years (most notably the Rolls-Royce Silver Shadow from the previous season) and how the Camaro was commissioned "fresh off the assembly line." Andrew then details the extent of the damage that the Camaro goes through over the course of the series. Still, despite the rapid devaluation (claiming that it is only worth about $40 at the end of the series), Andrew takes solace in the fact that the engine still works.; Vehicle Damage - Rob Collum and Bill Hoffie, the show's mechanics (and billed as the show's "unsung heroes"), talk about the maintenance of the cars used for the show. They compare the Camaro with a 40-year-old car that was also used on the show and say the older car is in much better shape. They also claim that the damage incurred on the show is not due to a lack of respect for the car, but the lack of knowledge on how to have the proper respect for the car. A detailed look on the extent of damage the Camaro takes over the course of the series is also examined.
2	"Driving Blind"	November 1, 2010
The RV Challenge: In every province in Canada, ordinary drivers are licensed to drive a vehicle 12 m (39 ft) long and weighing up to 11 t (24,000 lb). In this challenge, contestants must reverse a 1985 Gulf Stream Sunstream recreational vehicle around a gentle curve lined with metal barriers, with all the other contestants aboard as passengers.; Dean, going first, scrapes the paint off; Scott, in the passenger seat, manages to correct his course in the latter half of his run.; Paul and Scott coach Jamie through her run in a similar manner, but she hits 18 things.; Scott has minimal problems in his own run.; In contrast to Scott, Brad focuses so much on his driver-side mirror that he takes off his passenger-side mirror; the cross-talk between Scott, Dean and Paul gets him confused as well. (Despite these, he completes and passes the course.); Paul forces his way through the course, but only hits six things.; Dale is guided by four contestants inside the vehicle and John outside to pass her run.; Diane also goes through the first half of the course without hitting anything; her second half is only marginally worse.; Lance cries during his run, being the last person to take the course.; Results for the RV Challenge: Best Performer: Scott, despite not taking the challenge seriously, finished his run faster and with fewer hits than anyone else.; Worst Performer: Lance, who caused the most damage to the RV, took the longest to finish, and broke down in tears.; Running the Rails: The contestants must drive a car up a set of rails over a pool and touch a stop sign with the front bumper without dislodging a set of garbage cans above the sign, before reversing back the way they came.; Brad slides off after three seconds and fails.; Dean slides off to the right going forward.; Neither Dale nor Jamie are aligned in the beginning.; Scott has an advantage from a long lead-up, but knocks over the garbage cans and falls out of alignment in the reverse; Diane does the same mistake.; Paul, whose main problem is driving in the presence of other cars, remains calm; he is only driver who passes.; Lance manages to stay balanced, but he starts to reverse well before touching the stop sign.; Results for Running the Rails: Best Performer: Paul was the only nominee who passed this challenge.; Worst Performer: Dale and Jamie, as neither of them were able to align themselves properly before getting on the rails properly.; The Posture Check: Philippe evaluates the driving postures of all eight contestants and corrects them if necessary. He also teaches them the proper way to check their blind spot while driving, in preparation for the next challenge.; Camaro Challenge - The Shoulder Check Challenge: The traditional shoulder check challenge is done in the Camaro this year. In this challenge, drivers must drive past a set of lights to either side of them at 80 km/h, with one set of lights being all red and the other all green. Contestants must check over both shoulders to determine which side has the green lights and steer to that side to avoid hitting a large stop sign in front of them. (If neither side is safe, drivers must stop in front of the stop sign.); Paul passes easily, despite Andrew's concerns that he has a larger blind spot due to his long hair.; Jamie fails as she turns her wheel while performing her checks.; Lance does not turn in time and hits the stop sign.; Dean passes the challenge.; Brad goes too fast and heads in the incorrect direction.; Dale, like Dean, also passes, albeit out of luck rather than skill, as she does not see which side to steer to and blindly guesses.; Diane, who has trouble accelerating to highway speeds, accelerates to 80 km/h; her failure to shoulder check ends with her crashing into the stop sign.; Like Diane, Scott drives too fast and does not have time to check both shoulders, resulting in him taking the wrong turn and failing.; As he and Scott leave the course, Danny criticizes Scott for failing to take things seriously, especially after his subsequent joking about the failure from the last challenge. Danny then tells Andrew that he had overheard Scott bragging about his speeding habits to Jamie and Raeanne the previous night, intending to tell the panel that he had not learned anything, which further proves Scott's unwillingness to improve his attitude.: Results: Best Performer: Both Paul and Dean pass this challenge.; Worst Performer: Both Diane and Lance have the worst performances for hitting the stop sign during their runs.; Before Scott takes his run, his driving history is revealed. Though entering rehab to be a better driver for his son (Issac), he quickly earns the dismay of the show's crew for his juvenile behaviour. "Scott states on camera that he had driven far over the speed limit (once going as high as 200 km/h), kept driving despite having his license suspended, used another person's license while his was suspended (once while also under house arrest), committed hit-and-runs and driven while drunk; Cam relays the information to the Calgary Police Service, due to an obligation to his former profession as a police sergeant. Meanwhile, Danny (due to Scott effectively driving on Danny's insurance) calls his insurance company, having the insurance policy cancelled effective the day after the challenge. As a result, Scott is no longer insured or permitted to drive in any future challenges. When meeting with the experts, Scott says he needs to find a new "sucker friend" to insure him and act as nominator. He believes that if he drives safely for five years under someone else's insurance, he will then be able to afford his own. However, Scott is told that he will not be allowed to do so and will only be permitted to continue on the condition that he can pay for his insurance himself. Scott admits that this is completely infeasible, as his history of driving offenses means it would cost at least $1,200 per month to get his own policy; consequently, the experts tell him he is immediately expelled from rehab, becoming the second contestant in the show's history to be expelled (the first being Colin Sheppard from the second season for not willing to learn), and the first by his nominator. Due to his ineligibility to drive, Scott's license is returned and he leaves rehab in a cab with Danny, but not before the weight of reality sets in for him, as he becomes emotional. As Scott is driven away, Andrew's voiceover states that, in the three-and-a-half months since the season was filmed, Scott had not been criminally charged in relation to any of the issues raised in the episode. (However, on May 9, 2015, Scott was caught and charged with speeding when he was allegedly doing 176 km/h in a 100 km/h zone. He then faced several other charges including driving with a suspended license and operating an unregistered vehicle.)
3	"Up in Smoke"	November 8, 2010
The Three-Point Turn: A four-wheel-drive Jeep TJ will be used for this challenge, first introduced in the first season but last used in the second season (called The Dirty Circle at the time). Contestants must drive into an area surrounded by a moat and two large rocks and make a three-point turn without falling into the moat in 20 minutes. **Lance's best effort is a 21-point turn in eight minutes.; Dean gets frustrated after repeated attempts to improve a five-point turn, but he does finish with a three-point turn after six attempts and five minutes.; Paul and Brad both eventually pass thanks to their respective nominators.; Diane, understanding the geometry of the challenge, passes on the second try.; Jamie and Dale get the Jeep stuck in the moat.; Results for the Three-Point Turn: Best Performer: Diane, Paul, Brad, and Dean are the only ones who passed this challenge.; Worst Performer: Although Lance made a 21-point turn within eight minutes, Jamie and Dale are declared the joint-worst for getting the Jeep stuck in the moat.; The Teeter-Totter: This traditional challenge from the third season (but presented in its Canada's Worst Driver 4 incarnation) has contestants driving a stick-shift Mini and trying to balance it on a teeter-totter. Dale and Jamie have no prior stick-shift experience and thus, Peter gives them a lesson before the challenge.; Lance, who drives a stick-shift car at home, quickly burns through the clutch. The Mini is replaced by a 1990 Mazda Miata; Lance ends up burning out the Miata's clutch, too, consequently resulting in a fail.; In a third car, Diane manages to balance the car after repeated rocking of the teeter-totter.; Paul finishes quickly, as his motorcycle experience pays off. (Motorcycles, like stick-shift cars, have a clutch.); Because Donna is unable to accompany Brad due to her shoulder injury, Andrew accompanies Brad through his run. Another burned clutch causes Brad to fail.; Dean destroys the clutch on a fourth car, which results in him failing. (During Dean's run, Cam calls attention to Brian's habit of putting his feet on the dashboard, which would cause him severe injury if the passenger-side airbag deployed.); Dale drives right off the teeter-totter and burns the remaining clutch that was left following Dean's run.; Jamie, who was scheduled to go last, is exempt from doing the challenge, as they are out of stick-shift cars. (She was asked by Andrew if she would buy a stick-shift car, to which she said "probably not," thus automatically passing the challenge.); Results for The Teeter-Totter: Best Performer: Jamie is the only person who passed this challenge without even attempting it due to the fact there were no more stick-shift cars. (Of the people who did attempt the challenge, Paul is the only one to pass flawlessly; Diane also minimally balanced the teeter totter after several attempts.); Worst Performer: Dale is declared the worst for driving right off the teeter-totter.; Road Signs: Peter tests the drivers on their knowledge of road signs. Of the 14 questions asked, Brad got 8/14, while Dale posted the lowest score, with 1/14.; Camaro Challenge - Icy Corner: This challenge, last presented in the fourth season, has contestants use the Camaro (whose anti-lock braking system has been disabled) to accelerate into a curved wall at 50 km/h and make a sharp turn to avoid hitting it. Philippe's lesson teaches threshold braking to all contestants; contestants must brake, but avoid locking up the wheels to make the turn and pass the challenge.; Jamie, Paul and Diane all hit the wall.; Donna apologizes for Brad failing his run (as she becomes alarmed and screams while he makes the turn and causes him to hit the wall), even though Brad demanded silence before his run.; Dean, who has a habit of letting go of the brake altogether, destroys the course.; Dale had a falling out with John before the challenge, so Andrew helps Dale pass her run.; Finally, Lance passes the challenge on his first try.; Results: Best Performer: Lance and Dale are the only ones who passed this challenge, with Lance clearly performing the best.; Worst Performer: Dean is declared the worst for letting go of the brake altogether.; In deliberation, no one has a desire to graduate. However, Paul receives consideration by both Philippe and initially Peter (though he quickly retracts his statement). Paul is considered safety-aware, though Cam argues that his failing the Icy Corner challenge is a condemnation of his skills. In the end, the experts agree to honour everyone's request, marking the first time of the series that seven contestants remain heading into the fourth episode.
4	"Wet Behind the Gears"	November 15, 2010
Crazy Eights: The head-to-head reverse figure-eight challenge is first on the docket. This year, both cars (both Honda CR-X del Sols, one grey and one red) will start in the middle of the figure-eight course and the passing point will also be in the middle, after both cars have made one loop.; Dale and Peter comprise the first heat. Andrew accompanies Dale once again (after her falling out with John prior to the last challenge) in the red car; she drives opposite Peter (in the grey car). Peter finishes quickly and has to wait for Dale to pass and to finish. Dale eventually has to be stopped after she drives over a rim and punctures her car's gas line.; Diane and Dean comprise the second heat. Dean, frustrated with the slow reverse, passes the midway point; he then intentionally backs into Diane, forcing both to stop, though neither hit anything else.; Jamie and Brad form the third heat. Brad quickly grows frustrated due to Donna's mocking laughter and subsequent controlling behaviour, which Donna admits is a problem on her part. In contrast, Jamie is reluctant to take control of the car, continually asking Eric for advice. (Both Brad and Jamie do finish with minimal incident.); Lance and Paul make up the final heat. Lance, having taken every private lesson opportunity available to him, quickly gets to the halfway point in 48 seconds with minimal incident, but Paul (having to drive a small car) aggravates a back problem. His discomfort makes him unaware of an errant rim, which he runs over, rupturing the gas tank on the red car. Paul admits failure in the challenge, while Lance is somehow let off free.; Camaro Challenge - The Slalom Challenge: Back in the first episode, everyone failed the slalom portion of the basic assessment. After Philippe gives the contestants lessons on how to slalom properly, everyone must redo this portion of the assessment, this time at 80 km/h. This had never been done in previous seasons due to the crew having never trusted the older used cars employed for a challenge of this nature, hence the use of the Camaro.; Lance and Diane both go too fast and hit the foam figures.; Paul passes despite his frustration.; Donna's lack of screaming (an effort on her part to reduce a negative influence on Brad) nets Brad a pass as well.; Andrew is frightened when Dale drives, but she passes.; Jamie, going at 88 km/h, also passes to Eric's astonishment.; Dean's habit of letting go of the brake when things go wrong ruins his run, turning a pass into a fail at the last minute.; Rules of the Road: Peter tests the drivers on their knowledge of road rules. Of the ten rules tested, Paul got 8/10, while Lance posted the lowest score, with 2/10.; The Water-Tank Challenge: A Plymouth Reliant "K-car" station wagon with 200 litres (53 US gal) of water is used for this annual challenge. The obstacle course this year consists of a straight section of road at 60 km/h before slowing down and turning into a winding precision driving course, which includes a sudden stop to accommodate a pop-out car, leading to another precision section through rims and then to a raised platform before finishing with a slalom in reverse. For the third consecutive year, Andrew gets splashed on after being too ambitious on the raised platform, but the water he loses is still very little in comparison to that of the nominees.; Jamie quickly panics after the first turn and fails the reverse slalom.; Brad never drives slowly throughout the entire course and barely makes the first corner.; Diane, described as 'chronically slow,' ironically goes too fast on the straightaway and, like Jamie, quickly loses concentration (and composure) thereafter.; Paul has minimal issues in the initial portion, with most of his lost water coming from hitting obstacles. He learns that concentration is the key to success, and Tommy reiterates this throughout the challenge.; John returns as Dale's nominator for this challenge, but she destroys much of the course in her run.; Lance loses all his water by nearly failing to make the first turn.; Dean is too afraid to accelerate to 60 km/h and does not have enough room to slow down for the initial turn. The ensuing massive spill of water floods the car's engine, rendering it unusable.; In deliberation, Jamie, Paul and Lance all desire to graduate, though Lance admits he has no real chance of doing so. Dale expresses further resolve to improve, while Brad allows that he needs work on the relationship front more than on his driving skills. The experts make a unanimous decision to graduate Paul, described as "the perfect student," as the season's first official graduate without further discussion. Web extras for this episode: Dale's Confession – Dale and John, in the confessional, discuss on what happens when Dale was quizzed on what the speed limit on the highway is. Prior to that, she had thought that the speed limit varied between lanes (which is not true anywhere in Canada) before John corrects her and says that the speed limit on Ontario's highways (referring to the 400-series highways in Ontario) as 100 km/h. She also comments on various misconceptions she had before entering rehab (such as being able to drive with a malfunctioning speedometer, "blinker fluid" and needing only air conditioning and a good rear-view mirror to drive). The conversation goes into how she had gotten her driver's license 30 years ago and she admits that various luck factors may have played a part in how she avoided getting into some of the trouble by talking her way out of things.; Paul's Graduation – Paul takes to the confessional one last time and reflects on the skills that he had learned during rehab: the rules of the road (for which he later discovers that he had the best score with 8/10), as well as the skills taught to him by Peter and Philippe, which he credits to passing at least two challenges (as well as a third that he knew how to do but had failed), despite his many troubles fitting into the various cars on the show. He also speaks of the virtues of patience, as well as going back to the stresses of his normal life. He also reflects on how easily he absorbed the various lessons, chalking it up to experience and never regretting anything he has done.
5	TBA	November 22, 2010
Camaro Challenge: Swerve and Avoid: This annual challenge is dedicated to Sara Stosky, a fan of the show, who had taken the lessons from this challenge to heart and narrowly avoided a truck; she and her husband, Evan, are invited to the Driver Rehabilitation Centre as guests for this challenge. Contestants have two attempts at passing, driving at 70 km/h.; Lance hits the brakes and fails on his first go; due to his induced anxiety, he fails his attempt second as well.; Jamie, despite her anxiety (similar to Lance) and in sharp contrast to Lance, passes on her first try.; Dale misinterprets her senses, hitting the car on the first try and the brakes on the second.; Despite Donna's alarmed reactions, Brad also passes, a stark contrast from the earlier cornering challenge.; Diane fails her first run by going too slow and braking far beforehand; she is convinced to drive up to 100 km/h on a practice run before attempting her second run, where she accelerates to 80 km/h and almost clears it. (Nevertheless, she is considered to have passed the challenge for overcoming her fear of speed.); Dean clears the obstacle at 80 km/h, but later spins out of control, thus failing his first run; he then skids too far and loses control in the second as well.; Results of the Camaro Challenge, Swerve and Avoid: Best Performer: Both Jamie and Brad pass the challenge on their first attempts. (Diane also passes with an extra attempt.); Worst Performer: Nobody else passes, but Dean is declared the worst for spinning out of control in both his runs.; The Lane Change Rally: The challenge from the previous season returns, with the six contestants required to drive at 35 km/h and pass Andrew twice in his car. Each incorrect lane change will be penalized by one additional required pass. Despite Andrew telling everyone in advance that this is not a race: Lance starts the challenge by racing ahead and then entirely comes to a stop on the course when he realizes Andrew has not even gotten into his car. After Andrew temporarily halts the challenge in order to confront Dale (who had cut him off three times), Donna angrily criticizes Lance for staying in two lanes and trapping Brad.; When the rally resumes: Dean becomes the first person to "finish"; unfortunately, because he made three bad lane changes - and because Brian failed to make Dean do the extra laps - Dean actually fails.; Brad then finishes the rally successfully, but the experts refuse to consider it a true pass since Donna was controlling Brad's every decision, and he still made four bad lane changes.; Lance eventually gives up after getting nearly every lane change wrong, having to park some distance away from the rest of the group to avoid Donna's frustration.; Jamie, despite making more bad lane changes than anyone except Lance and Dale, eventually manages to grasp the challenge and passes.; Diane easily has the best performance as, despite her slow and steady pace, she only makes two bad lane changes and finishes with minimal input from Raeanne.; Dale is therefore left as the last person on the course, meaning that she automatically fails, with minimal knowledge on how to correctly change lanes.; Results of the Lane Change Rally: Best Performer: Diane and Jamie are the only ones who passed this challenge, with Diane clearly performing better.; Worst Performer: Dale is declared the worst for cutting Andrew off three times, even though Lance straddled two lanes and trapped Brad.; Drifting Donuts: The challenge first introduced in the third season returns, with Philippe first teaching the drivers how to perform donuts through countersteering. Though it requires contestants to do only one donut in 30 minutes, Andrew does two to make up for his rare miss last season.; Jamie steers ahead too often and fails the challenge.; Lance, who mistakenly believes a full circle is 365°, also fails.; Brad, with Donna cheering him on, passes with ease, celebrating with donuts of the edible variety.; Dean fails from frustration.; Diane manages to complete a donut after several attempts.; Finally, Dale, who had trouble learning the technique (having driven off the course on many occasions during her lesson), hits the central obstacle repeatedly, causing Andrew to force her out of the car after she nearly runs him over as a joke.; Results of the Drifting Donuts Challenge: Best Performer: Brad and Diane are the only two people to pass this challenge, with Brad passing with ease and Diane taking several attempts.; Worst Performer: Dale is declared the worst for nearly running Andrew over.; In deliberation, Brad states his case for graduation, having been angered and upset (like Donna) after Lance's antics during the Lane Change Rally (they evoked memories of his mother's death in a construction accident in 1990, when she had been run over by a dump truck). Lance knows he is not graduating as a response to this, but promises to keep his attitude in check. Diane also states her case for graduation and Jamie also wants to graduate based on her performance. In the end, Brad and Diane make the experts' shortlist due to their similar successes. The initial vote is 3–2 in Diane's favour, but Andrew disagrees, as he still feels that Diane needs a little more confidence, whereas Brad's problem is more Donna's controlling behavior than his bad driving, which Cam agrees with. In the end, however, Dr. Kennedy-Smith somehow talks Andrew and Cam into also backing Diane, whom she points out was indisputably responsible for her own success in the Lane Change Rally, whereas Brad performed worse even with Donna's constant advice. Diane therefore gets the unanimous vote to become the season's second graduate (marking the second time a contestant graduated in the fifth episode after Billie-Jean Leslie graduated in the fifth episode of the third season; Shelby D'Souza would have graduated that episode instead of being the eventual "runner-up" if not for Dr. Louisa Gembora's sole dissenting opinion that Billie-Jean, passed over three straight episodes due to Denice Koke (who was the last to arrive in rehab that season), Thomas Hobbs (who passed both Billie-Jean and that season's eventual worst, Jason Zhang, to make it to rehab before everyone else), and Marnie Maddison (whose performance in The Cross proved to be the difference-maker, as she finished with the fastest time, considering she quit on The Balanced Beam for Unbalanced Drivers) all having breakout performances, wouldn't be passed over a fourth straight week), ensuring that there will not be three women in the finale. Web extras for this episode: Diane's Graduation – Diane reflects on her graduation and the basic (and not so basic) skills that she has learned and that, without it, she would have been crying and at a loss of what to do. She thanks the producers of the series for letting her on the show and what she has learned through them.
6	TBA	November 29, 2010
The Eye of the Needle: This annual challenge will take place in a right-hand-drive Nissan 300ZX for this season, to test the theory that drivers in the past were more likely to hit arches on the passenger side (in past seasons, on the left-hand side) as opposed to the driver side.; Dale is quickly confused by the right-hand drive car and hits every single arch on the passenger side at below the minimum speed of 50 km/h. (Contestants only have one attempt at speed, so Dale is permitted another run, in which she hits all the arches on the passenger side again and fails.); Lance also fails the challenge after clipping the first and fourth arches on the passenger side and the last on the driver side. Donna's anxiety makes Brad nervous during his run and he hits an arch every time she screams (which she does twice), once on each side of the car.; On Jamie's run, she hits the third arch so off-centre (to the passenger side) and at such high speed that the windshield nearly shatters. (Up to that point, the show's crew had never even considered this possible.); Because Jamie had seriously damaged the right-hand drive vehicle, Dean will get to do his run in a left-hand drive Suzuki Swift. He goes flawlessly at 40 km/h, prompting him to try for an 80 km/h run (Andrew's directions had been to drive at the fastest speed that he felt comfortable). He passes easily, much to Brian's surprise.; Results of the Eye of the Needle: Best Performer: Dean is the only person who passed this challenge.; Worst Performer: While nobody else passes, Jamie is declared the worst for shattering the windshield during her turn.; The Cross: Though the show had tried to avoid using vintage cars for challenges this year, they are forced to use their 1970 Chevrolet Monte Carlo—previously used as Andrew's car in the Lane Change Rally in the previous episode—in this challenge, first introduced in the third season due to running out of cars from the 1980s and 1990s. (So far, four stick-shift cars have burnt clutches; the Plymouth Reliant "K-car" station wagon used in Episode 4's Water-Tank Challenge is flooded; and many other vehicles have either gotten extensively damaged or gotten stuck.); Lance quickly scratches the car's doors in his run.; Jamie also has trouble, further scratching one side.; Dale's bleeding gums causes concern from Andrew.; While Dale rests through the challenge, Brad takes to the course. He makes a perfect run while trying to reassure Donna (though Donna believes that his approach is not the way that she herself would have done had she been the driver).; Dean finishes the fastest, only striking one object.; Camaro Challenge - The Trailer Challenge: For this challenge, contestants must tow a sailboat hooked onto the back of the Camaro and prior to it, Peter gives everyone a lesson on how to drive forward and reverse with a trailer. The course consists of a precision forward section into a hairpin turn before reversing the boat onto a boat launch into the Grand River. Andrew encounters a slight problem on his demonstration run (he makes contact with obstacles on two separate occasions), causing the show's crew to widen the course for everyone else's run.; Brad and Donna they cooperate through the forward portion, while subsequently arguing through the reverse.; Jamie also encounters problems and constantly asks Eric for directions; Eric eventually helps after attempting to keep quiet through much of her run.; Despite frustration with the hairpin turn, Dean runs through the course without hitting anything in six minutes on a course that took Andrew 33 minutes in his demonstration.; In sharp contrast, Lance nearly tips the boat by getting the trailer wheels caught on the rims while also negotiating the hairpin turn; next, he drives the trailer through a stack of hubcaps, starting to drag more obstacles even prior to switching from forward to reverse; and finally, he jackknifes the boat into the wall of the boat launch while backing it into the water.; Dale is uncomfortable through her run, but John advises her through half of it. Though he tries to avoid helping her through the second half, he is forced to help her through that as well.; In deliberations, both Dean and Brad want to graduate (though Brad admits that his communication struggles with Donna are still a major obstacle). Jamie knows she will not graduate after her poor performance in the Eye of the Needle and Lance knows he still needs to learn more in order to graduate. Dale also wants to graduate, but her performance says otherwise; Dale claims that her medical issues are preventing her from continuing in her rehab. Dean is at the top of everyone's graduation shortlist, with Philippe even claiming that Dean is the only person on his shortlist. Dean graduates, but the experts also believe that Dale's medical problem will prevent her from continuing. Because only one person may leave per episode, though, Dale is forced to make the final choice. She ultimately chooses to let Dean go free over her own health, making Dean the next to leave the Driver Rehabilitation Centre, once again guaranteeing that there won't be three men in the finale. Web extras for this episode: Dean's Graduation – Dean reflects on his experiences and that going at high speed can be lethal. He also reflects on the proper posture for driving and how it contributed to not speeding like he had before. Brian also makes notes of Dean's improvements and Dean summarizes his experiences as "entering as an aggressive driver and leaving as a perfect driver."
7	TBA	December 6, 2010
The Trough: The challenge from the previous season returns, in which the contestants must drive the Jeep TJ on a course made of a series of concrete Jersey barriers placed on their side. Contestants must remain on the concrete at all times; if the TJ slips off or gets stuck, the contestants must start over.; Lance is unable to go through the course in the one-hour time limit.; Jamie makes it across on her third try after panicking on her first two attempts.; Because the nature of the course may aggravate Donna's shoulder injury, Andrew must accompany Brad. He makes it about three feet from the end in the final run before running out of time and scraping the bottom of the truck.; Andrew also accompanies Dale on her run (John sits out due to extreme heat), but Dale promptly gets herself stuck repeatedly.; Distracted Driving: The annual lesson on why distracted driving (especially texting while driving) should not be done has contestants drive a figure-eight course while doing many things at the same time.; Dale, who had driven straight through her garage door on one occasion, gets the point easily.; Jamie, who is from the only province where there is no ban on cell phone use while driving (at the time of taping; the ban has since been put in effect), has never done this nor tried this herself. When she attempts it, she ends up doing poorly.; Brad, who does not own a phone, tries instead to apply lipstick, with similarly destructive results.; Lance, though, treats the exercise as a joke and fails to get the point when he is told to apply lipstick, eat, and drink while behind the wheel.; Canada's Worst Cup: In a variation of the Shopping Cart Hockey challenge from the previous season, the contestants must push an oversized soccer ball across a soccer pitch with a car. The ball may bounce off any number of foam defenders, but the car may not hit any of them. Furthermore, when shooting at the goal, the car may not cross the final white line.; Dale has trouble controlling the ball initially, but manages to score eight goals in 15 minutes.; Lance repeatedly hits the foam goaltender with his ball and only gets four goals in his run.; Brad accidentally injures Donna in the passenger seat during his run and thus is disqualified with four minutes left.; Jamie becomes frustrated with Eric talking too much during her run, but she manages to tie Dale for the most goals, with eight.; Results of Canada's Worst Cup: Best Performer: Dale and Jamie are the only ones to do fairly well, scoring eight times each despite Dale initially having trouble controlling the ball and Jamie complaining about Eric talking too much (something Donna did a lot of during Brad's Eye of The Needle run).; Worst Performer: Even though Lance only scored four times due to repeatedly hitting the foam goaltender, Brad is declared the worst for accidentally injuring Donna in the passenger seat.; Camaro Challenge: Handbrake J-Turn: The contestants must take on the traditional challenge in the Camaro this year (but at 60 km/h).; Jamie picks up the lesson quickly, but is too nervous about challenge time; she hits the foot brakes repeatedly and fails her set seven runs.; Andrew makes Brad do a few dry runs before making his attempts. Brad manages to pass after three attempts (he fails the first two due to hitting the foot brake), but Cam is quick to discount Brad's accomplishment - in his mind, Andrew overstepped his bounds by helping Brad too much.; Rain strikes before Lance's run, so Andrew tells him to never accelerate above 70 km/h due to hydroplaning concerns; the course speed limit is now lowered to the standard 50 km/h due to the rain.; Lance fails his first three runs by triggering both the handbrake and foot brake before making the turn; he then fails his next three attempts by pulling the handbrake too late; and he then fails his last attempt by failing to even find the hand brake (as he had taken his hand off of it).; Dale fails all of her seven runs by triggering the foot brake (and, in some of the runs, she hits obstacles en route to the obstacle she has to turn around), prompting her to think that this challenge is beyond her.; Neither Dale nor Lance will graduate for sure, by their own admissions. Jamie admits that Brad is the better driver, but Brad believes that he is bound for the final three. The experts are again split on whom to let go. In another 3–2 split decision (with Peter and Dr. Kennedy-Smith backing Jamie and Phillipe and Cam backing Brad, leaving Andrew to cast the deciding vote), Jamie ends up being this season's penultimate graduate, sending Brad into the finale with Dale and Lance. Web extras for this episode: Jamie's Graduation – Jamie expresses surprise at her graduation and managing to avoid the final three. She also talks about her thoughts of her experience on the show and she credits passing the high-speed challenges as key to improving her confidence. Eric also comments on Jamie being a better driver, which means that he would not have to escort Jamie around as much as he did before rehab.
8	TBA	December 13, 2010
The Gimbal: The first challenge has the contestants all together in the same Plymouth Reliant "K-car" station wagon as they attempt to balance the car on top of a gimbal in half an hour, with their nominators sitting outside.; Lance narrowly avoids running out of time, balancing out at 29:43. He then helps Dale (the only female nominee remaining after Jamie graduated last episode) finish in 8:30.; Brad finishes in 5:41 in uncharacteristic silence.; Results: Fastest Performer: Brad performed the fastest at 5:41.; Slowest Performer: Lance performed the slowest at 29:43.; Mustang/Camaro Challenge: The Mega-Challenge: This year's version of the final exam challenge features two legs: the first to be performed in a third-generation Ford Mustang and the second to be done in the Camaro. In the Mustang portion, contestants must take a sharp turn at a corner before proceeding to a precision forward and reverse course. They then have five minutes to perform one donut before switching to the Camaro for the second leg, in which they must perform an Eye of the Needle, a slalom and a handbrake turn before balancing on a teeter-totter.; Brad takes the corner too late, but manages to make the donut. (However, Donna's alarmed reaction after accompanying him in silence through the first leg causes him to suddenly stop after crashing through the last two arches in the Eye of the Needle, making him unable to make speed for the handbrake turn.); Neither Lance nor Dale pass any portion of the Mustang leg, but Dale makes a slightly better run in the Camaro, balancing on the teeter-totter on the first try.; Lance goes too fast on the Eye of the Needle and slalom portions, only managing a 3/4th turn in the handbrake turn.; Despite hitting the most objects, Dale's run is judged the best since she kept her cool throughout and applied the lessons taught, though it is noted that all three runs were relatively poor and that the three remaining drivers are essentially equal going into the Final Road Test.; Road Test: Drivers must navigate a course involving 30 turns through the streets of Niagara Falls in a Porsche Boxster (modified with a speed limiter to prevent sudden bursts of acceleration), with the beginning and ending at Parking Lot Niagara Falls, since the Camaro is no longer road-worthy.; Lance suffers an anxiety attack shortly after making the initial turn onto Niagara River Parkway; his challenge is immediately called off, due to Andrew believing Lance needs medical assistance.; For Brad's run, Donna is beside him in the passenger seat, with Andrew in a chase car. Despite going off-course, Brad and Donna somehow manage to maintain their composures; Brad's run finishes with a minimal number of incidents, none of which were moving violations.; Dale, commits a moving violation less than five minutes into her drive, and the moving violations keep accumilating; by the end of her run, she commits 19 moving violations, which would have cost $2,532 in fines had a police officer seen them all.; In deliberation, Dale says she has learned a lot, but her results say otherwise. However, the experts still do give her credit for finally admitting that she has severe issues behind the wheel and that, regardless of whether or not she is named Canada's Worst Driver, she still has a massive amount to learn. The experts congratulate Brad and Donna for the improvements in their relationship that have led to better driving; however, they question whether Lance's anxiety, which he claims to be unrelated to his driving, could be affecting him. Dr. Kennedy-Smith suggests that he see a psychiatrist, but Lance bluntly states he does not need any more help. In the end, after 20 minutes of deliberation, the experts arrive at a unanimous decision: Brad, having been shortlisted twice and made relatively few mistakes in the Road Test, is not Canada's Worst Driver. Dale does not graduate, but, by at least managing to finish the Road Test despite her numerous errors, avoids being named Canada's Worst Driver. However, the experts feel that she should not drive until she is retested; Andrew refuses to allow her to drive herself home and has John do it instead. (Usually, the runner-up is allowed to drive themselves home.) In the end, Lance, by virtue of having failed to complete the Road Test and refusing to acknowledge the issues which cause him so much trouble on the road, is named Canada's Worst Driver and becomes the sixth person (third man) to be awarded the trophy.
