= Canada's Worst Driver 5 =

- Season 5
- No. of episodes: 8

Release
- Original network: Discovery Channel
- Original release: October 26 – December 14, 2009

Season chronology
- ← Previous; Canada's Worst Driver 4 Next → Canada's Worst Driver 6

Canada's Worst Driver 5 is the fifth season of the Canadian reality television show Canada's Worst Driver, which aired on the Discovery Channel. As with previous years, eight people, nominated by their family or friends, enter the Driver Rehabilitation Centre to improve their driving skills. This year, the Driver Rehabilitation Centre is located at CFB Borden, the military base previously used as the rehab centre for Canada's Worst Driver 2; however, it is only referred to on-air by Andrew as an "undisclosed military location." The focus of this season was on Driver's Boot Camp. The series launch was set to coincide with the launch of a new law in Ontario prohibiting the use of handheld electronic devices while driving. Similar bans have been instituted in Atlantic Canada and Quebec, with Manitoba and Saskatchewan considering similar laws. The initial drive started in Barrie, Ontario and the final road test occurred in Toronto, Ontario for the second year in a row and third in the last four seasons. This season will also be the second to be featured on the iTunes Store and the first to have new episodes one day after first airing.

== Experts ==
Three experts return from Canada's Worst Driver 4, though Dan Bagyan, head instructor from the past season, is not among them.

- Cam Woolley is the show's longest-serving expert, having been present in every season except the first and has seen the habits of Canadian drivers change drastically since 2000, with the most common offense having changed from DUI to distracted driving. He is the traffic expert on CP24 in Toronto and had a 25-year career as a traffic sergeant with the Ontario Provincial Police.
- Philippe Létourneau is a veteran high-speed driving instructor who counts BMW and Ferrari among his clients. Since joining the show in the third season, the average car has gained considerably in speed and acceleration, with the high-speed emphasis of this season making his job a particularly important one.
- Dr. Louisa Gembora has been in private practice since 1994 and has been in the psychology field since 1980. In her off-time, she drives a single-seat race car.
- Peter Mellor is the new head instructor this season who is with the Advanced Motoring Bureau and is the host of Wheel Base, a Canadian syndicated driving program. A graduate of the Jim Russell Racing School and the Ferrari and BMW driver training programs, he is dedicated to the "art of driving."

== Contestants ==
- Michael "Mike" Butt, 28 and licensed for 12 years, from Regina, Saskatchewan, is a telemarketer who has had 11 vehicles and has asked others to drive cars in reverse for him. His brother-in-law, Jodie Burkholder, is the only one in his family who believes driving skill is not hereditary and he is willing to go into rehab with Mike to prove his point. He drives a black beat-up Buick Century and drove a red Ford Focus to the rehabilitation centre. Mike is the nephew of comedian/actor Brent Butt.
- Melissa Cook, 32 and licensed for 15 months, from Saint John, New Brunswick, is a mother whose problems are twofold—one is that she has never had formal driver's education and it shows when she constantly drives 20 km/h under the speed limit. The other is her common-law husband, Wil Fawcett, who verbally abuses her when she is driving. She drives a silver Pontiac Grand Prix and drove a silver Ford Taurus to the rehab centre.
- Crystal Hubley Farao, 46, from Windsor, Ontario, is a businesswoman who has had 11 reported major accidents on the road, including one occasion in which she caused $15,000 damage in her car, only to cause another major accident in a rental car while her car was being replaced. This is partly because, aside from the fact that she has 20/120 vision in her right eye, she is extremely distracted, as she appears to be severely addicted to her cell phone. Though she has been nominated by eight or nine separate people, a record for the series, her ex-sister-in-law and business partner, Theresa, represented the other seven or eight people. She drives a black Pontiac G6 GT convertible.
- Father Giles Joly, 56, from Richmond, Ontario (near Ottawa), is a Roman Catholic priest who is too conservative on the road: on major highways, he has only driven the full 110 km/h limit once in his lifetime. It is frequently observed that he drives too slow. His brother, Guy, wants him in rehab to help him get more confidence. He drives a silver Ford Freestar.
- Joanna "JoJo" Kopty, 19 and licensed for two years, from Dollard-des-Ormeaux, Quebec (near Montreal), is a spoiled teenager who's on the limit of her demerit points; she's had 13 accidents, including backing her mother's car into her father's car. Her friend, Nima, wants her in rehab to avoid another episode where the two were hospitalized as a result of an accident. She drives a black Honda Civic and drove Andrew's green 1998 Mazda B4000 to the rehab centre.
- Angelina Marcantognini, 26, from Sudbury, Ontario, is a recently licensed "stay-at-home girlfriend" who has had many fender benders. Her best friend, Christine Latondress Andrews, wants her in rehab for her own good, as her unsafe driving has led her to drive when the two are going out together. She drives a beige Pontiac Sunfire.
- Jakob Poirier, 25 and licensed for nine years, from Charlottetown, Prince Edward Island, is a punk rocker whose road rage has led to 12 major accidents. When on tour, his band, "Slaveclass," no longer allows him to drive. He has been nominated by his girlfriend, Stacey Fitzsimmons. He drives a white Chevrolet Blazer and drove a black Ford Escape to the rehab centre.
- Arun Suryanarayanan, 25 and licensed for six years, from Windsor, Ontario (originally from Mumbai, India), is a mechanical engineering student who has yet to be accustomed to the rules of driving on Canadian roads, having moved to Canada in 2005. His wife, Sanah Shaheen, wants him in rehab to get rid of his habit of driving in the middle of two lanes and taking up two spots when parking. He drives a blue Pontiac Grand Am and drove an orange Chevrolet Cobalt to the rehab centre.

== Synopsis ==
| Contestant | 1 | 2 | 3 | 4 | 5 | 6 | 7 | 8 |
|---|---|---|---|---|---|---|---|---|
| Angelina Marcantognini | IN | IN | IN | IN | IN | IN | IN | CWD |
| Mike Butt | IN | IN | IN | IN | IN | IN | IN | RUNNER-UP |
| Arun Suryanarayanan | IN | IN | IN | IN | IN | IN | IN | OUT |
| Jakob Poirier | IN | IN | IN | IN | IN | IN | OUT | |
| Father Giles Joly | IN | IN | IN | IN | IN | OUT | | |
| Crystal Hubley Farao | IN | IN | IN | IN | WD | | | |
| Melissa Cook | IN | IN | OUT | | | | | |
| JoJo Kopty | IN | OUT | | | | | | |

(CWD) The contestant became Canada's Worst Driver.
(RUNNER-UP) The contestant was runner-up for Canada's Worst Driver.
(OUT) The contestant graduated.
(IN) The contestant was shortlisted for graduation.
(WD) The contestant withdrew for compassionate/personal reasons.
^1 Non-Elimination Week, due to all contestants wanting to remain at the Driver Rehabilitation Centre.

== Episodes ==
| No. | Title | Original release date |
|---|---|---|
| 1 | "Basic Training" | October 26, 2009 |
The Drive to Rehab: This season, the journey to the Driver Rehabilitation Centre starts from Minet's Point Park in Barrie, Ontario, with the eight drivers heading to rehab using a provided set of instructions, a journey that Andrew notes is an hour-long drive that includes following a list of 50 turns. The contestants depart in the following order: Melissa, Father Giles, Jojo, Mike, Arun, Crystal, Angelina and Jakob. Everyone makes a large number of moving violations on the way to rehab and, aside from Melissa (who endured 60+ insults from Wil) and Father Giles (never at the speed limit the whole trip), who both arrive in the same order they left, the other contestants arrive in the following order: Mike (despite stopping for directions), Jojo (speeding the whole way), Crystal, Jakob, Arun and Angelina (wildly off-course after making the wrong first turn).; First to Arrive: Melissa was the first to leave and the first to arrive.; Last to Arrive: Angelina was the last.; Silver Shadow Challenge: Basic Assessment: The skills evaluation is performed in a Rolls-Royce Silver Shadow vehicle this year and involves a tight reverse course, before turning the car forward inside a concrete box and driving into a 45 km/h slalom before crossing a white line and braking, stopping in front of a wall. Mike, going first, gets stuck in reverse (and was excused from the box because of it) and fishtails out of control in the slalom. Crystal fails her slalom due to holding a cigarette in her hand and thus having one hand off the steering wheel. Jojo has no issues in reverse or in turning the car forward, but hits the slalom obstacles repeatedly. Angelina is the first to hit the car inside the box and hits the slalom obstacles going half the required speed. Arun hits the very first obstacle going into the reverse portion and fishtails out of control on the slalom. Melissa goes the entire course enduring insults from Wil and Wil going as far as to abandon her in the concrete box. Worst of all, she hits the wall in the end. Father Giles hits obstacles on the way to the slalom, where he never makes it above 40 km/h. Finally, Jakob learns firsthand the trademark difficulty of the challenges, as he gets stuck in the concrete box and nearly rolls the car over in the slalom, in a course that he originally dismissed as "easy."; Best Performer: Jojo, who managed the first two sections of the course without any difficulty despite failing the third.; Worst Performer: Jakob, whose overconfidence causes him to do poorly in the first two sections before nearly having a dangerous accident in the slalom.; In the evaluations, Mike and Jakob admit to not as being skilled as they had originally thought, while everyone else is taught harsh lessons by the drivers. As usual, no one graduates this episode, as it serves merely as a skills evaluation. Discovery Channel's web extras for this episode: Jakob: Punk or Poseur? - Jakob, in the confessional, trashes Andrew while discussing his own attitude issues and the fact that he admits that all eight contestants are bad drivers, but then retracts his trash-talk when he fears that Andrew will retaliate based on his comments the next day.; Crystal - Crystal, in the confessional, discusses her past driving history and her distractions behind the wheel. Like Jakob, she gives her first impressions on Andrew.; Arun - Arun, in the confessional, admits that he had failed to notice that his handbrake had been on or five minutes during his first drive and how he had not worn seat belts before due to "cramping his style." However, he is optimistic about learning at the Driver Rehabilitation Centre.
| 2 | "Standard Manoeuvres" | November 2, 2009 |
The Shoulder Check Challenge: To teach shoulder checking, contestants must speed down a straightaway at 70 km/h, and check on both sides to see if the signs are green or red and, if necessary, take an appropriate turn at a fork in the road ahead. Contestants have only one attempt at this challenge. Jakob is the first to pass after stopping at the fork when he is faced with reds on both sides. Jojo passes facing a left-side green. Crystal and Arun hit the side of the road, while Mike, Melissa and Angelina all plow into the fork in the road. As for Father Giles, he goes too slow and does not make his exit, leading Andrew to teach him how to accelerate to 120 km/h (so high it is over the speed limit everywhere in Canada).; Best Performer: Jojo and Jakob, who both passed without any trouble.; Worst Performer: Angelina; while she was one of several drivers who crashed into the fork in the road, Angelina additionally kept applying the gas after her crash, further wrecking the course.; Medical Exam: All contestants are required to take a medical exam this season. Melissa has the best reaction time, while the person with the slowest reaction time and the poorest vision is, not surprisingly, Father Giles.; Stick Shift Parallel Park: The contestants must drive a Mercedes-Benz G-Class, a standard transmission vehicle, in a 300 m (980 ft) off-road circle before returning to the starting point and parallel parking it between two cars. Mike, an experienced stick-shift driver, takes 14 attempts to park. Novice Melissa does better with only ten attempts, even though Wil insults her about it. Crystal hits the car in front of her, while Jakob manages to damage the car's gearbox on a climbing portion. Father Giles parks too far from the curb, while Arun, despite having once owned a stick-shift vehicle, has trouble getting the car going as he attempted to use one foot to operate the clutch and gas pedals. Angelina had the worst performance, nearly hitting every obstacle. Jojo was the only person to pass easily, due to Nima's assistance in parking.; Best Performer: Jojo, who despite needing help from Nima had the only pass.; Worst Performer: Angelina, who had by far the most hits.; Limousine Figure-Eight: In the first figure-eight challenge of the season, the contestants must reverse a limousine in a wide figure-eight loop, with the other seven on board. Jakob, going first, sets the mark by taking only two minutes, only hitting five things in the far end of the course. Arun, going last, however, tops that by taking six minutes and not hitting anything (the only driver to achieve this feat), earning the praise of everyone else. Jojo (having veered off-course) and Father Giles (going slowly through the course) were only slightly off Jakob's mark, hitting six and seven things, respectively. Everyone else veers wildly off-course and hits many things.; Best Performer: Arun, who was the only driver not to hit anything, and Jakob, who had the fastest run.; Worst Performer: Mike, who had the highest number of hits and got into a major argument with the other drivers (especially Angelina) during his run.; In the end, three drivers received consideration for graduation: Jakob, Jojo and Father Giles. Phillippe believes that Jakob's "punk attitude" still needs to be addressed and thus, he was eliminated from consideration. Between Jojo and Father Giles, one fared better overall and the other was "more safe." Because Jojo did better, she is the first graduate. As a reward for being first out, she does not drive home in the car she arrived to rehab; instead, she is allowed to drive away in a Mercedes-Benz.: What Accounts for CWD's Popularity - Series Executive Producer Guy O'Sullivan is interviewed on why Canada's Worst Driver has become popular.; The Man Who Buys the CWD Cars - Series Producer Blair Ricard is interviewed on his roles as a producer, including sourcing the cars that are used on the show. He admits that the cars used are all used expensive cars that he has always wanted and admits that he is saddened by the fact that they are almost always damaged on the show.
| 3 | "Head to Head Combat" | November 9, 2009 |
The Figure Eight Redux: Due to the shockingly bad performance in the last Figure Eight challenge (in which Melissa, Crystal, Mike and Angelina knocked over at least 40 obstacles each), the Figure Eight Challenge returns, but this time is taken from Canada's Worst Driver 3. In this challenge, two Mercury Grand Marquis sedans begin face-to-face in the middle of the Figure Eight course and the contestants must reverse all the way around the course. First is Crystal and Arun. Arun, the only driver who didn't hit anything in the Figure Eight challenge last episode, is careful, but gets too greedy and reverses too far. While Arun and Crystal argue, Sanah is the only one to notice the sole passing area in the whole course (on one end of the figure-eight where Arun had passed) and further cooperation allows Crystal uses to finish ahead of Arun. Arun, confident in reversing slowly but horrible reversing fast, is given a lesson on how to reverse fast by Andrew. Melissa and Father Giles make up the second heat. Father Giles accidentally steps on the gas pedal instead of the brake while reversing, sending his car out of control and nearly hitting Andrew (stopping only because the car was trapped above a rim). When Andrew forces Wil from the car after seeing Melissa hit too many things, Melissa has no further problems reversing. Mike and Angelina are in the third heat. Christine immediately gets Angelina to drop the coffee and cigarette while reversing, but it only gets her into more trouble, causing Angelina to break down. Meanwhile, Mike has reversed to Angelina's position, on the opposite end of the passing point, causing Mike to be frustrated (though both do eventually finish). Jakob, without a partner after JoJo graduated last episode, gets to reverse with Andrew. Jakob's only hits were while driving forward and, during the challenge, admits to a change in driving attitude.; Best Performer: Jakob, who had the fewest hits during his run.; Worst Performer: Angelina, who insisted on trying to attempt her run while drinking a coffee, and caused the most damage to the course.; Road Signs: The annual road sign test is given to the contestants. Jakob is the best at signs, getting seven right, while Angelina misses all but one sign (the picnic table).; The S-Turn Challenge: The S-Turn is a lesson that's taught every year in various forms. The challenge is performed in a right-hand drive Nissan S-Cargo, in an S-shaped course. Contestants must move laterally through the S-shaped course using repeated S-turns. Arun, going first once again, often mistakes forward and reverse gears and eventually gives up after 52 minutes. Crystal hits seven things, but picks up the lesson easily. Angelina is distracted through the challenge due to taking a phone call partway through. Jakob still hits many things, but he is proud at not losing his composure during his run. Mike relies on Jodie the whole way through the challenge. Father Giles repeats the mantra "halfway" through the second half of the course and hits only one thing in his run. Wil, pledging not to speak during the challenge, hypocritically insults Melissa 10+ times in her run, leading Andrew to look into Wil's behaviour as a passenger. In a private meeting recommended by Dr. Gembora, Andrew makes Wil listen to footage of himself insulting Melissa.; Best Performer: Father Giles, who completed the challenge with only a single hit.; Worst Performer: Arun, who was the only driver who failed to complete the challenge. Of the drivers who did complete the challenge, Angelina was the worst, taking a phone call during her run and having by far the highest number of hits.; The Eye of the Needle: This year, there are four numbered archways, which the contestants must go through at 70 km/h in order in a standard-transmission Lowrider. Arun hits the obstacles. Father Giles, who, in his youth, drove stick-shift, makes a perfect run. Wil's positive attitude also leads Melissa to drive another perfect run. Crystal repeatedly hits on the right side and admits that her accidents in the last 15 years are due to not wearing corrective lenses, which are a condition of her driver's license. Jakob makes a perfect run despite poor car handling. Angelina mistakes first gear for third and, as a result, hits two arches. Mike also makes a perfect run without effort.; Best Performer: Father Giles, Melissa, and Mike all had perfect runs. Jakob also passed, albeit while oversteering the car.; Worst Performer: Arun and Crystal, who had the joint-highest number of hits.; In deliberation, Melissa and Jakob make the experts' shortlist, but Wil's attitude change proves to be the difference maker, as Melissa is named the season's second graduate, guaranteeing that there won't be an all-female finale like in the previous season. Discovery Channel's web extras for this episode: Those Cars are Just Pieces of Metal - Philippe is interviewed on the program from an experts' point of view and Andrew's progress as a driver over the years. He also states that, contrary to his line of work, in the end, cars are just "pieces of metal" and that the driver is the one who makes the car.; Andrew's Retrospective - Andrew reflects on his favourite contestant of past years-- Canada's Worst Driver 3 "runner-up" Shelby D'Souza-- and his most horrifying moment to date, the portion of the road test where eventual "winner" Jason Zhang stopped while trying to merge onto Ontario Highway 400.
| 4 | "Tanked" | November 16, 2009 |
Distracted Driving: The annual lesson on the dangers of not putting the player's full attention to the road is done in a new way. This year, contestants take an AMC Marlin and perform a series of tasks while driving, trying not to hit any obstacles in process. Unlike previous years, contestants are not driving in a circle (but the course contains many turning portions and tight curves). Common tasks include applying lipstick, eating while driving, changing CDs and so on. Mike and Jakob learn hard lessons from the challenge (Jakob, in particular, pledges to eat drive-thru food while parked in a parking lot). Arun, in particular, has a habit of driving slower while distracted, but nevertheless hits many things. Angelina's run is highlighted by being so distracted by repeated calls, including one to her boyfriend, Andy, that she fails to notice that one of her tires had blown out. Father Giles is perplexed at how women could apply makeup while driving during his run. Crystal refuses to learn the lesson, adamantly defending her "right" to smoke while driving.; Rules of the Road Test: Peter administers a quick 10-question road sign test to the contestants on proper road behaviour, such as which car has right-of-way when two cars are arrive at a four-way stop at the same time. Jakob is the best with seven right and Mike is worst with only three.; Drifting Donuts: The annual donut challenge teaches contestants to look where the car should be going when in a rear-end skid, as well as countersteering. After lessons taught by Phillipe, they must do so inside a confines, around a foam donut. Notably, Andrew takes two attempts to do the challenge himself, despite having learned how to do the donut in the third season and having done it every year since on the first try. Mike and Father Giles both fail at the challenge, despite picking up the lesson well. Crystal completely demolishes the walls before making a donut and believes the car was deliberately rigged. Angelina initially could not handle the lesson, but despite her squeamishness, she learns quickly. During the challenge, however, she quickly forgets her lessons and blows her second tire of the episode. Stacey, having witnessed Jakob crashing firsthand, closes her eyes through much of his run, making Jakob question whether he deserves to graduate.; Best Performer: No-one; all the drivers were practically as bad as each other.; Worst Performer: Angelina, who not only failed the challenge but blew one of the car's tires as well.; Silver Shadow Challenge: The Water-Tank Challenge: This year, the Rolls-Royce Silver Shadow is used for the annual challenge. In this year's course, after a simple right turn at a stop sign, a precision driving challenge follows, before going on a straightaway at 30 km/h, heading into a sharp curve, through a corral, where they must reverse the car at 20 km/h into the finish. Andrew is splashed for the second year in a row, losing 16 litres (4.2 US gal) of water in the tank. Arun misses the stop sign and the water makes him destroy the course, hitting 26 things. Father Giles, calm throughout, does not hit anything, but repeatedly hits the brakes suddenly, losing half the water in the tank (but, despite this, posts the best run of the day). Crystal's habit of pulsing the pedal leads to getting splashed and missing the stop sign, resulting in 180 litres (48 US gal) lost in her run. Angelina, who also pulses the pedals, fears the water tank and rightly so, as she loses 130 litres (34 US gal) and struggles to drive in reverse. Jakob, who has grown a dislike for the Rolls-Royce after a disastrous performance in the Basic Assessment Challenge, in which he nearly rolled the car, is repeatedly splashed, losing 160 litres (42 US gal) and, in the confessional, admits he had one of the most destructive runs of the day. Despite understanding the intent, Mike nevertheless loses 170 litres (45 US gal).; Best Peformer: Father Giles, who lost the least water.; Worst Performer: Crystal, who lost the most water, narrowly ahead of Mike and Jakob.; In deliberation, it is recognized that everyone did poorly in the donuts and water tank challenge. In the end, none of the six contestants believe they deserve to graduate, a first for the series. Nevertheless, Father Giles receives consideration for graduation (by Cam). The experts agree to honour everyone's request to stay, so no one graduates. Discovery Channel's web extras for this episode: Melissa: The Second Graduate - Melissa is interviewed after her graduation. Wil also presents his input on becoming a better passenger, vowing to keep the CD given to him by Andrew on their private drive in their car's glove box.
| 5 | "Close to Home" | November 23, 2009 |
The Lane Change Rally: The contestants will attempt to pass Andrew, driving a Cadillac limousine at 25 km/h, twice on an oval circuit. All the contestants will be on the course at the same time, so the challenge will require various lane changes as the contestants will also need to pass each other. The cars that the contestants drive are as follows: Angelina: 1960s Chevrolet; Mike: Ford Pinto; Arun: Buick Riviera; Jakob: Mercury Grand Marquis; Father Giles: Cadillac DeVille; Crystal: Chevrolet Camaro; Each incorrect lane change will result in requiring an additional pass of the limo. Arun gets into his habit on driving between two lanes, which Cam notes is a $110 offense for failure to stay in marked lane. Two minutes into the challenge, Father Giles is the first to finish. Jakob exits the course second much later. Angelina repeatedly makes the mistake of checking the wrong side (checking to the right when intending to change to the left lane). Arun, in the meantime, repeatedly cuts off everyone else (first Crystal, then Andrew—both on bad passes—and then Mike from the outside lane into the infield) before having to be dragged off the course for everyone else's safety. Crystal finishes after nine bad passes and Mike finishes with 19 bad passes, but both are considered to have failed the challenge due to the excessive number of bad passes they each made; the experts also did not feel that Crystal had learned anything from the exercise. Before Angelina finishes, Andrew intentionally drives off the course, but it is a while before Angelina realizes that the challenge has concluded.: Best Performer: Father Giles and Jakob were the only drivers to pass, with Father Giles performing slightly better without making any bad passes, proving that slower really is safer.; Worst Performer: Even though Crystal finished with nine bad passes and Mike finished with 19, and Angelina failed to realize that the challenge ended after Andrew drove off the course, Arun committed so many unsafe passes (along with being consistently rude to Sanah) that he had to be removed from the challenge.; Driving at Night: The contestants are driven in a windowless van and taken to Oasis, a desolate garage in Alliston, Ontario 33 km (21 mi) away from the Holiday Inn Hotel and Suites in Barrie, where they are staying during rehab. The contestants must drive back to the hotel, but this time with another contestant's nominator (the contestants are free to arrange who they will pair up with). Angelina's car is discovered to have an expired registration (her registration expired in February, less than six months before filming began), so her car is intentionally towed to the location. Father Giles is paired with Theresa (who immediately asks for directions back to the hotel), while Jakob is paired with Guy (driving without directions, though fortunately, Guy was able to recognize local landmarks and work out a route). Arun is paired with Stacey, while Mike is paired with Sanah. Prior to the challenge, Crystal (paired with Christine) arranged for an eye exam and is prescribed a contact lens over her right eye (as she has 20/120 vision and no peripheral vision). She immediately discovers that she tends to drift into oncoming traffic. Meanwhile, Angelina (paired with Jodie), adamant on using her own car, asks her boyfriend, Andy (who, as Andrew notes, is half a world away in Indonesia), to repair her headlights, but eventually calls a tow truck (and sealing up last place). Mike, however, is caught driving 110 km/h in a 50 km/h zone, something Cam notes is a $10,000 fine with immediate license suspension and car impoundment. Once again, Father Giles is first to finish (thanks to Theresa's good directions and Father Giles' "brand-new speedy skills," as Andrew notes, for finally going the speed limit, even accidentally breaking it), with Jakob finishing 10 minutes later, just as the tow truck finally arrives for Angelina. Arun finishes third, with Mike coming in fourth. Crystal was the slowest of the drivers who actually participated in the challenge, but her dramatically improved peripheral vision was demonstrated when Christine revealed upon arrival that Crystal was able to narrowly dodge a raccoon on her way to the hotel.; Best Performer/First to Arrive: Father Giles was the first to arrive, thanks to Theresa's good directions and his brand-new speedy skills.; Last to Arrive: Even though Crystal was the last of the drivers who actually participated in the challenge, Angelina was the last to arrive due to having to call a tow truck because her vehicle's registration had expired.; Worst Performer: Mike, who repeatedly drove far over the speed limit, to the point where his car would have been impounded had the police caught him.; Handbrake J-Turn: The contestants are taught by Philippe on how to perform a Forward Handbrake J-Turn (a modified bootleg turn), as first seen on Canada's Worst Driver 3. The key to the technique is to make the car front-heavy by taking the foot off the gas, before using the pendulum effect (turning right before a sudden turn to the left) and the handbrake to swing around (this process is known as a Scandinavian flick). For the challenge, the contestants must accelerate the Mini Cooper to 50 km/h, making the turn around a foam figure. Contestants have five attempts before being forced to retire. Angelina hits the brakes and loses control of the car, failing her five attempts. Jakob and Mike both make it on their fifth attempts after a few close calls. Crystal fails her five attempts, her last knocking down the foam figure.; Before Arun and Father Giles can take their attempts, Crystal receives information that her brother-in-law was fatally injured in a motorcycle accident. She is permitted to leave the Driver Rehabilitation Centre to be with her family. In the confessionals and in front of the experts, everyone expresses grief over Crystal's loss, reflecting on their own skills in the process (Father Giles also weeps). It is also revealed via footage that all of the drivers of this season fail to yield in their daily driving routines. While speaking to the panel, Father Giles says that hearing of Crsytal's tragedy has only made him more determined to improve his skills; Jakob and Angelina admit to causing minor accidents via their own failures to yield, while Mike is given a stern warning by Cam over his excessive speed during the night driving challenge. Out of respect for Crystal's brother in law, no one graduates this episode; the end credits for this episode were silent, with a dedication prior to the credits. Discovery Channel's web extras for this episode: Angelina's Words of Wisdom - Angelina presents excerpts from her own personal scrapbook in the confessional, compiled since her teenage years.
| 6 | "Riding the Rails" | November 30, 2009 |
Reverse Flick: The Reverse Flick, first taught in the previous season, returns. In this challenge, the contestants must reverse into the box at 30 km/h, do a 180 J-Turn in a confined space, before exiting the box forwards. Contestants have 10 attempts before retiring. Mike finishes on his final attempt, while Jakob fails, due to overspeed and swinging the wrong way. Arun also fails for hitting the brakes and losing control of the car in his attempts. Father Giles finishes easily and patiently, while Angelina (the only female nominee remaining after Crystal withdrew from rehab last episode) requires Andrew's assistance to pass, due to her new "hands-on" learning philosophy (this would ultimately be the only challenge Angelina would pass all season).; Best Performer: Father Giles, who passed the challenge without needing assistance.; Worst Performer: Arun and Jakob, who both failed all their runs.; The Trough: The annual lesson on knowing where the wheels on a car are takes this form this year. In the challenge, contestants must travel through a sand and concrete course, while having the wheels remain on the concrete at all times. Sanah learns quickly the key to the winding course is to take wide turns and gets Arun to pass after three attempts. Jakob, however, tops that by passing on his second attempt. Mike frequently hits the sand on the first turn and fails. Angelina and Father Giles gets their cars stuck on multiple occasions and also fail.; Best Performer: Jakob, who passed the fastest in only two attempts.; Worst Performer: Mike; he, Angelina and Father Giles all failed, but Mike made the least progress between the three.; Shopping Cart Hockey: The experts had been baffled at how Mike drives poorly at low speeds but well at high speeds. On the first day, Mike explains to Andrew that he had learned high-speed driving from pushing shopping carts with his car. Fascinated, Andrew and the experts endorsed the challenge of Mike's creation (because of this, Mike doesn't do the challenge as he shows it to Andrew). In this challenge, contestants must push a shopping cart with a car up until a white line before letting the shopping cart's momentum lead it through a goal. Contestants have up to ten attempts to score a goal. Angelina's first shot only narrowly missed, but she was never able to match it in her next nine, usually losing control of the cart before she got to the line. Jakob had looked like he scored on his last attempt, but his car was over the line. Arun was intent on ramming the cart from a distance, but never succeeds. Father Giles prefers a slow approach, accelerating towards the line only at the end. He is the only one to score.; Best Performer: Father Giles, who was the only contestant to score.; Worst Performer: Arun, who never came close to scoring on any of his attempts (Angelina and Jakob didn't score either, but both had at least one narrow miss each).; Trailer Troubles: The annual trailer challenge has contestants drive a truck which has two trailers, making the car a total length of 23 m (75 ft). They must drive the trailer into a campsite and park it in marked spaces; the truck itself faces the outside of the campground, while the large and small trailers are behind it. Due to the difficulty of reversing with two trailers, Andrew clearly states that some problem solving is needed: the smaller trailer will invariably need to be unhitched and pushed to its space. Jodie, who drives with trailers daily, gets this and directs Mike to finish. Arun overdrives the campground and fails in the reverse. Guy, recognizing the problem, leads Father Giles to pass the challenge, with the truck and trailers facing three different directions. Angelina fails after declining the idea of unhooking a trailer. Jakob is puzzled by the challenge and, due to Stacey being unable to drive, is puzzled by what to do.; Best Performer: Father Giles and Mike, who both passed despite needing significant help from their respective nominators.; Worst Performer: Although he, Angelina, and Jakob all failed for similar reasons (not thinking to unhook the trailer), Arun caused the most damage to the car and the trailer.; In deliberation, only Father Giles and Jakob express the desire to graduate. The experts also feel similarly, but note that Father Giles' only issue, being underspeed, is fully addressed (as evidenced by the night driving challenge in the previous episode), while Jakob's issue, road rage, still needs work. Because of this, Father Giles graduates, but not before everyone salutes him with his signature two thumbs up pose. Discovery Channel's web extras for this episode: In Father Giles We Trust - Father Giles is interviewed after his graduation. The Driver Rehabilitation Centre served to reinforce his beliefs and was worth the spiritual journey. Guy also retracts his "Sunday driver" comment from his initial nomination, stating that he is an "all week" driver now.
| 7 | "Uphill Battle" | December 7, 2009 |
The Trough, In Reverse: Except for Jakob, who passed this challenge on his second attempt last episode, everyone else had done so badly on the Trough that the same challenge (on a slightly different course) will be done in reverse. As Andrew notes, the key to the challenge is to take wide turns to allow the car to swing when reversing around a curve and adjusting the car's mirrors to ensure that the wheels stay on the concrete. Jakob does worse in reverse compared to forwards in the last episode, nearly losing his composure and failing the challenge outright. Arun, who also passed going forward, is told by Sanah to stop and think, but still oversteers and fails. Angelina fails to use her side mirrors and uses Christine extensively for advice. Christine eventually caves and handles the wheel for Angelina. Though the run is without incident, she fails as Christine effectively drove from the passenger seat. Mike, whose major issues is reversing, is slow and methodical, but does manage to pass after 21 attempts.; Best Performer: Mike, who had the only pass.; Worst Performer: Jakob, who in the complete opposite of the forward version of this challenge, quickly got stuck on all his attempts (Arun also failed, but was able to get a little further in his attempts).; The Gimbal: The season's featured challenge (shown on Daily Planet after the first episode aired, with host Ziya Tong attempting the challenge) is one where the contestant must balance a stick-shift truck atop the gimbal, a swiveling platform with a hemispherical base. The truck must remain on the gimbal at all times. The lesson is on fine movement on a stick-shift vehicle. Angelina is convinced to quit the challenge by Christine when her platform shoes start to impair her ability to "feel the pedals," while Arun eventually perseveres after 13 minutes. Jakob, keeping his composure, also balances in five minutes (faster than Andrew in his demonstration run). Mike is initially frustrated, but also balances after 12 minutes.; Best Performer: Jakob, who completed the challenge in by far the fastest time.; Worst Performer: Angelina, who was the only driver not to complete the challenge at all, choosing to give up rather than switching to more suitable footwear. Between the drivers who did finish, Arun marginally took the longest.; Off-Roading: The drivers must drive off-road, passing through eight gates on an off-road course. As the course has a real danger of rolling over due to the steep hills, each contestant, after their run, must coach the contestant going after him. Jakob, going first with Andrew as his guide, proceeds calmly and gets Arun to do the same. When Arun tries to do the same to Mike, an experienced off-roader, Mike proceeds recklessly and fails. Similarly, Angelina, intimidated by Mike, also proceeds recklessly on her run.; Best Performer: Jakob, who not only passed, but was able to coach Arun to a pass on his run.; Worst Performer: Mike, who completely ignored Arun's advice on his own run, and then proved more of a hindrance than a help to Angelina on her run.; Swerve and Avoid: In the annual challenge on not braking in order to retain steering control when sudden obstacles appear, the contestants must drive at 70 km/h before swerving to avoid a foam car that may appear in one exit. Contestants must do the run five times, with Andrew as a passenger on the final run. Arun fails only once. Angelina, after challenges where her high-heeled shoes often got in the way, gets new driving shoes for this challenge, but the shoes do not appear to help, failing all five runs. Jakob also fails only once, ironically when no cars appeared. Mike makes the mistake of "guessing in advance" and driving overspeed on several occasions (which would only make the swerve harder) and fails his last three runs.; Best Performer: Arun and Jakob, both of whom passed four of their five attempts.; Worst Performer: Angelina, who failed all five of her runs.; In deliberation, Jakob and Mike express interest in leaving. Arun does not feel ready to graduate yet, but is confident that he is not the worst of the remaining drivers, while Angelina finally starts to believe she is Canada's Worst Driver. The experts, however, are unanimous in their decision without a second thought—Jakob, shortlisted but passed over three times due to someone else having a breakout performance, is the season's penultimate graduate, not only ensuring that there won't be three men in the finale, but also sending Mike into the finale with Arun and Angelina. Discovery Channel's web extras for this episode: The Last Stand of Jakob Poirer - Jakob is interviewed after graduation. He explains that he may still be "punk rock" and that he still does "what he feels like," he concedes that "what he feels like" has changed. He also admitted that he knew that he had an attitude problem before arriving in rehab and that the experts' opinions further cemented the point.; Confession Jams - Music consisting of mashups of confessional footage of Jakob, Arun, Mike (on Father Giles' leaving the previous episode) and Angelina (on the Water-Tank challenge), is shown.
| 8 | "Judgement" | December 14, 2009 |
Reverse Serpentine: The contestants must reverse around a slalom course in 30 seconds or less. Contestants have up to ten attempts before being forced to retire and will drive with each other as passengers. Mike fails all ten attempts (including one where the rear passenger door swung open), while Angelina kills the transmission on the Audi after her seventh attempt (while making Mike vomit as she fishtails the car, as seen in the episode's preview in the previous episode). In a new car with better handling, she fails her last three. Arun notes that wide turns would kill his chances of finishing on time and, despite Angelina being distracting by talking on the phone, manages to pass on his last attempt, finishing off with a reverse spinout and preventing a bonus round from happening when none of them could pass that season's Forward and Reverse Slalom in a combined 30 attempts, leading Andrew to propose a first-ever bonus round, in which all three finalists would succeed on their first attempt, with Ashley finishing the fastest).; Best Performer: Arun, who had the only pass on his final try, preventing a bonus round.; Worst Performer: Angelina, who killed the Audi's transmission and never once came close to passing.; The Mega-Challenge: This year's mega-challenge is in two legs. In the first, contestants must do a reverse flick before a forward slalom and an Eye of the Needle portion. Then, continuing with the car in reverse, they must proceed in a precision course before switching to the second car. In the second, the contestants must drive forward and do a forward handbrake J-Turn before tackling a short reverse, before ending the challenge attempting to balance on the gimbal. Mike fails each key portion, becoming more and more frustrated with each part. After the challenge, Mike admits that his only saving grace is if either Angelina or Arun do worse. Luckily for Mike, Angelina does do worse, as she causes the Camaro to overheat partway through the precision reverse and destroys the whole reverse portion while out of control in the forward handbrake J-Turn, causing Andrew to wonder if she should be driving at all. Arun's run is somewhat better, passing the first precision reverse, the forward handbrake J-Turn and balancing on the gimbal all on his first attempt.; Best Performer: Arun, who fully passed three components of the Mega Challenge.; Worst Performer: Although Mike and Angelina both failed every component, Angelina was far worse, as she caused the Camaro to overheat in the precision reverse, then drove carelessly, and finally destroyed the reverse portion while out of control in the forward handbrake J-Turn.; Road Test: Drivers must navigate a course involving 35 turns through Toronto, this time in a Ford Mustang GT convertible, with the beginning and ending at the Charles Hayden Municipal Parking Garage. Mike makes 23 moving violations, including an illegal right turn onto Nassau Street from Augusta Avenue after missing his turn onto Spadina Avenue from Dundas Street West (the same one, in fact, that Amy-Lee "Amy" Wisniewski from the previous season made during her own final drive), committing two moving violations within seconds—stopping past the line at the intersection of Spadina Avenue and Dundas Street West (the same one, in fact, that saw Canada's Worst Driver 2 "runner-up" Michael Telford commit the fourth of his six moving violations when he only drove a meter when the signal turned green) and turning into two lanes, but what was considered his breaking point came when he is so distracted by three bicyclists on his right at three separate intersections—Beverley Street and Dundas Street West (in front of the Art Gallery of Ontario), Spadina Avenue and Baldwin Street (the same one, in fact, that Michael also missed during his own final drive and had to do said U-Turn at Spadina Avenue and Dundas Street West to get back on track) and Queen Street West and Peter Street—that he fails to notice an old, blind pedestrian crossing in front of him. The rest of his run includes failing to signal while changing lanes on Yonge Street in front of the Mirvish Theatre, stopping at the intersection of Dundas Street West and Huron Street, running a red light at the intersection of Yonge Street and Dundas Street, turning left on a red light at the intersection of Bay Street and Dundas Street West, turning onto Gloucester Street from Church Street from the wrong lane and turning left from Gloucester Street onto Jarvis Street and into the oncoming lane (believing Jarvis is a one-way). With a total of 23 moving violations (in that regard, the worst-ever final drive by a nominee who wasn't named the worst of their season) Mike knows that the only way that he will not be named Canada's Worst Driver is if Angelina really screws up on her drive, because Arun most certainly won't on his. Luckily for Mike, Angelina does screw up, as her anxiety forces her to take medication combined with plenty of pulling over to regroup herself, first within 30 seconds of the drive, then a second time at the corner of Wellesley Street West and St. Nicholas Street after turning onto Wellesley Street West from Yonge Street for 20 minutes, then a third time after changing lanes while crossing Spadina Avenue from Nassau Street onto Cecil Street (the same intersection Mike ran a red light on during his drive). Andrew tries to convince her that, in her state, she is unfit to drive at all. Finally, at the corner of Carlyle Street and Wales Avenue in front of Toronto Western Hospital, Andrew tries to convince Christine to tell Angelina the same thing, but after a rest, Angelina walks off in disgust, vowing never to relinquish her license or stop driving. As for Arun, his own drive was uneventful, making a rare perfect run that included naming the five best things he learned in rehab despite a heckling bystander at one point. Andrew even considers him the "poster boy" for the Driver Rehabilitation Centre (assuming there was anyone deserving to be on a poster) and an amazed Cam admits that he was just about to give up on him prior to the Road Test before considering him the most improved driver in the four years he has been an expert, while Phillipe admits to being blown away by Arun's perfect drive.; Best Performer: Arun, who had a perfect, flawless final drive.; Worst Performer: Mike committed 23 moving violations and nearly running down an old lady at the intersection of Queen Street West and Peter Street. (Angelina's final drive was called off due to her anxiety.); In the end, Arun is given a round of applause by Andrew and the experts, with his status as the final graduate all but confirmed due to the Road Test and since he is the obvious final graduate, as he passed every challenge this episode. Andrew calls Arun a great example of a rehabilitated driver; Aru thanks the rehab centre for their help and support (he thanks Sanah for nominating him for rehab in his departure video). In contrast, criticism is given to Mike, who is still upset by his experience in the final drive. After Cam reprimands him, Mike admits that he probably shouldn't continue to drive and Andrew challenges him to decide once and for all, by handing him back both his license and a pair of scissors. Mike destroys his license, admitting that he couldn't live with himself if he killed someone through his bad driving, especially after seeing how Crystal was affected by her brother-in-law's death earlier in the season. An embarrassed Angelina refuses the notion of destroying her license, claiming that she was awarded it legitimately. Despite all four panel members strongly recommending that she give up driving, at least until she is able to better control her nerves, Angelina remains defiant to the end. While Cam, who disagrees with Andrew and the rest of the panel that Angelina is the worst, is unconvinced that Mike will actually stop driving and Dr. Gembora questions whether Angelina and Mike could be named the joint-worst, Andrew pushes for the panel to make a unanimous—and ultimately, inevitable—decision on who is the worst, as Angelina is named not just the worst driver of this season, but the worst to have appeared on any of the show's first five seasons—as she passed just one challenge during her time on the show, the Reverse Flick in Episode 6, albeit with Andrew's help (the only other driver in history to have passed only one challenge up to this point was Donna Hicks from the previous season. Normally, the "runner-up" would be allowed to drive home, but since Mike, who therefore fails to graduate, cut up his license, a limousine was hired to take him home. During the journey, Mike reflects on his overall attitude, vowing to reform himself and earn a new license (he has since quit driving), while Angelina's car is towed away and she is given a cab ride to a nearby airport, as the fifth person (third woman in the last four seasons) to be awarded the trophy.

== Reception ==
Canada's Worst Driver 5 continues the series trend of being the most-watched show on Discovery Channel, with the first episode garnering the highest ratings in the history of Discovery Channel, and was the highest-rated non-sports specialty channel show for the night. Discovery Channel also boasted that the show's ratings routinely beat out those for conventional channels in the same timeslot, specifically naming Heroes (on Global) and The National (on CBC).
