= Canada's Worst Driver 4 =

- Season 4
- No. of episodes: 8

Release
- Original network: Discovery Channel
- Original release: October 27 – December 15, 2008

Season chronology
- ← Previous; Canada's Worst Driver 3 Next → Canada's Worst Driver 5

Canada's Worst Driver 4 is the fourth season of the Canadian reality TV show Canada's Worst Driver, which aired on the Discovery Channel. As with previous years, eight people, nominated by their family or friends, enter the Driver Rehabilitation Centre to improve their driving skills. The focus of this season was on the Legal Consequences of Bad Driving. This year, the Driver Rehabilitation Centre is located at the old Guelph Reformatory Prison, an abandoned correctional facility in Guelph, Ontario, that closed down in 2002 due to being too harsh. The initial drive started in Kitchener, Ontario, and the final road test occurred in Toronto, Ontario.

== Experts ==
Three experts return from Canada's Worst Driver 3, though Scott Marshall, head instructor for the first three seasons, is not among them.

- Cam Woolley is a legal expert who has been present in every season except the first and has seen the habits of Canadian drivers change drastically since 2000, with the most common offense having changed from DUI to distracted driving. He is a retired traffic sergeant who had a 25-year career with the Ontario Provincial Police (at the time of filming, Cam was still with the OPP) and now serves as the traffic expert on CP24 in Toronto.
- Philippe Létourneau is a high-performance driving instructor with the Jim Russell Racing School, having been also featured on Discovery's Star Racer series. He is also a lead driving instructor for BMW Driver Training and the "Ferrari Driving Experience" at the Mont Tremblant race track. Philippe has enjoyed a successful career with over 40 podium finishes in 120 race starts.
- Dr. Louisa Gembora is a psychologist who worked at the Hamilton Psychiatric Hospital in Hamilton, Ontario, before moving on to private practice in 1994. She drives a race car in her spare time.
- Dan Bagyan is the new head instructor this season who is with Signature Driving School.

== Contestants ==
- Teagan Cramer, 18, from Edmonton, Alberta, despite being an excellent skateboarder, is a young and nervous driver who tries to compensate by jerking the steering wheel back and forth (termed the "wobble"). However, his dangerous driving is causing him trouble in meeting girls. The youngest nominee in the history of the series at the time, he is nominated by his buddy, Mat Smith. He drives a black Ford Ranger and, because he is too young to have a rental car insured, drove Andrew's green 1998 Mazda B4000 to the rehab centre, forcing Andrew to head to rehab in a different vehicle, as his truck is way too small for Teagan, Mat, Andrew and a camera crew all at the same time.
- Curt Higham, 51, from New Westminster, British Columbia, has been in 46 accidents through his driving career. Part of this may be because he is so distracted, often he does not watch the road. He was originally nominated by his husband of 31 years, Vance McFadyen, for Canada's Worst Driver 3, but he was apparently too good for rehab then, as he hadn't hit rock bottom. In fact, Vance had refused to allow Curt to drive for over three years due to his driving record. He drives a green Ford F-150 and drove a black Ford Windstar to the rehab centre.
- Donna Hicks, 61, from Sault Ste. Marie, Ontario, is a fearless driving grandmother – so much so, she refuses to stop at stop signs or red lights; yet simple driving tasks, such as reversing, seem to elude her. She even sometimes drinks and drives, which she claims happens "only when I play bingo"; i.e. when she drives home from the bingo hall. She is nominated by her son, Claude Vienneau, who is worried for his safety, her safety and the safety of her grandchildren. She drives a blue Dodge Spirit and drove a beige Mazda Protege to the rehab center. Donna died on March 1, 2022 due to complications from COVID-19.
- Lindsay Kloss, 23, from Kelowna, British Columbia, is a sales representative who is an accident-prone and extremely distracted driver, claiming to hit something every few weeks and knowing all of Kelowna's tow truck drivers on a personal basis. On one occasion, she managed to hit the gas meter of her fiancé's home. Her driving was so bad that three people nominated her, though the fiancé whose home gas meter she hit, TJ Papp, will be accompanying her to rehab. She drives a white Ford Taurus and drove a gray Ford Taurus to the rehab centre.
- Ashley van Ham, 21 and licensed for seven years, from Medicine Hat, Alberta, is a road raging and easily distracted driver (her favourite feature on her car is a plug to plug in a curling iron, ostensibly to curl her hair while driving), having cost her husband and nominator, Bryan, over $15,000 in vehicle repairs. Ashley enters rehab in order to protect their infant son, Diesel and is especially motivated to graduate early in order to not miss his first birthday. She drives a black Ford F-350 and a Mitsubishi Endeavor and drove a beige Mitsubishi Lancer to the rehab centre.
- Emily Wang, 33, from Calgary, Alberta (originally from China), is an inexperienced and distracted driver struggling with something as simple as moving a car forward. This may be because her driving skills were a result of having only 10 hours of training in obtaining her license and English is not her first language. She is nominated by her fiancé (at the time of taping; they are married by the time the show aired), Scott Nicholson. She drives a green Chevrolet Cavalier and drove a black Chevrolet Cavalier to the rehab centre.
- Kenneth "Ken" Westwood, 59, from Mission, British Columbia, is a traveling salesman who has a habit of tailgating and speeding and is unapologetic about his ruthless behaviour on the road. He is nominated by his buddy, John Levitt, who is worried that his antics may cost him his license and way of living. He drives a silver Kia Rio and drove a red Ford Focus to the rehab centre.
- Amy-Lee "Amy" Wisniewski, 30 and licensed for seven years, from Bethune, Saskatchewan, is a mother of five who is a nervous wreck behind the wheel, stemming from a lack of confidence in driving. Because of this, she refuses to drive the 59 km (37 mi) to Regina, even though her business depends on a weekly commute there. She is nominated by her husband, Bob, a truck driver. She drives a white Pontiac Sunbird and drove a blue Ford Focus to the rehab centre.

== Synopsis ==
Contestant	1	2	3	4	5	6	7	8
Ashley van Ham	IN	IN	IN	IN	IN	IN	IN	CWD
Emily Wang	IN	IN	IN	IN	IN	IN	IN	RUNNER-UP
Amy-Lee Wisniewski	IN	IN	IN	IN	IN	IN	IN	OUT
Teagan Cramer	IN	IN	IN	IN	IN	IN	OUT	
Lindsay Kloss	IN	IN	IN	IN	IN	OUT		
Donna Hicks	IN	IN	IN	MED				
Ken Westwood	IN	IN	OUT					
Curt Higham	IN	OUT						

(CWD) The contestant became Canada's Worst Driver.
(RUNNER-UP) The contestant was runner-up for Canada's Worst Driver.
(OUT) The contestant graduated.
(IN) The contestant was shortlisted for graduation.
(MED) The contestant was medically released.
^1 Non-Elimination Week, due to all drivers failing the swerve and avoid.

== Episodes ==
No.	Title	Original release date
1	"Guilty as Charged"	October 27, 2008
Starting on Top: This season, the journey to the Driver Rehabilitation Centre starts from the Duke-Ontario Parking Garage in Kitchener, Ontario, with the eight drivers heading to rehab using a provided set of instructions, a journey that Andrew notes is an hour-long, 45 km (28 mi) drive. The contestants depart in the following order: Amy-Lee, Donna and Emily, Curt, Lindsay, Teagan (who, because he is too young to have a rental car insured, is driving in Andrew's personal truck), Ken and Ashley. Everyone makes a large number of moving violations on the way to rehab and the contestants arrive in the following order: Donna (who sped 34 times), Curt, Lindsay, Ken (who Andrew refuses to allow park in his space due to his engaging in a brief street race with Ashley), Amy-Lee (who committed nine moving violations), Teagan, Emily (who committed 25 moving violations) and Ashley (who broke 26 laws).; First to Arrive: Donna was the second to leave, but the first to arrive.; Last to Arrive: Ashley was the last.; Porsche Challenge: Basic Assessment: In the traditional skills evaluation, the contestants must reverse a Porsche 928 out of a tight corner and then in a straight line, before going through a slalom portion at 40 km/h with both hands on the wheel at all times. After exiting that portion, they must accelerate the Porsche to 60 km/h, before stopping in front of a wall of boxes. Ken, going second, is the first contestant to scratch the car (Ashley, who went first, had managed to not hit anything except for the boxes at the end), while Emily cannot even reverse out of the corner, getting her car stuck and Donna gets a rim stuck under the car. Lindsay is the only contestant (other than Ashley) to not hit the barriers, while Curt destroys most of the rim section. Teagan needs two attempts just to get up to speed in the slalom, which he does on the second try, only to hit three on the first try and not hit any obstacles in the reversing portion. However, none of the contestants could avoid hitting the wall of boxes.; Best Performer: Ashley and Lindsay were the only two to not hit the barriers, with Ashley doing slightly better.; Worst Performer: Although Curt destroyed most of the rim section, Teagan was the worst, due to his constant jerking of the steering wheel.; Before the episode draws to a close and the contestants have their first meeting with the experts, Cam takes Donna, Teagan, Ken and Ashley for a tour of the prison and explains to them that their actions that had led them to their nomination and arrival at rehab could have caused them to be sentenced to prison time—Donna for drinking and driving, Teagan for hit and runs and Ken and Ashley for their street racing on their way to rehab—after which all four are locked in separate cells for a few minutes, long enough to break down and understand where their consequences will lead them if they're not careful. As usual, no one graduates this episode, as it serves merely as a skills evaluation.
2	"Big Manoeuvres"	November 3, 2008
Having arrived at the Driver Rehabilitation Centre, the lessons and challenges begin in earnest. The lessons begin with a how-to on large vehicle handling.: Prison Laundry: The contestants must reverse a laundry trunk through a simple obstacle course, up a ramp and into a garage. To do so successfully, however, each contestant must use their mirrors and repeatedly do the "S-bend" (a staple lesson at the Driver Rehabilitation Centre), as each nominator will tell their nominee. Amy learns the hard way, hitting obstacles left and right and not using her mirrors, while Ken, who does not finish in his hour, is so frustrated at the end of his run that he is contemplating quitting driving. Neither Ashley nor Lindsay finish in their hour (though both were affected by a sudden thunderstorm over the course). Donna and Teagan hit the building in front of them with the front bumper. Curt has the best run of the day, encountering trouble only in the middle of the course while keeping his emotions in check. Emily's poor vision in the challenge prompts Andrew to commission an eye exam for every contestant, to be done after the second challenge.; Best Performer: Curt's performance was easily deemed the best by the experts.; Worst Performer: Ken, Ashley, and Lindsay all fail to complete the course on time.; Parallel Parking: The annual tradition of a parallel parking challenge returns here. Contestants must park a Ford Windstar between two vehicles in front of the patio of the Albion Hotel in downtown Guelph full of onlookers (the other contestants and their nominators included). The contestants will have one minute in each attempt and each failure will cause the driver to take one lap around the block. Lindsay is the only one to pass on her first try (claiming that it is her strong suit, even though she did not use her mirrors once during the challenge), while Curt gets it in two (the first being too far away from the curb). None of the other contestants (including Teagan, who, because he is too young to have a rental car insured, is once again forced to drive Andrew's personal truck) finish, but Donna is the worst; she even gets out of her car during her first attempt to berate a passing car waiting for her to park, causing five moving violations in one (no signal, no seatbelt, jaywalking, abandoned car and dangerous driving). This was enough to not only cost her $595 in potential fines had she been caught, but also have her license suspended on the spot.; Best Performer: Curt and Lindsay were the only two people who passed this challenge, but Lindsay doing slightly better.; Worst Performer: Donna did the worst, going so far as to get out of her car during her first attempt to berate a passing car waiting for her to park.; Icy Corner: In this challenge, on a car lacking an anti-lock braking system, contestants must corner around a simulated ice patch. Each contestant will have two tries in accelerating their car to 25 km/h before tackling the corner, which they should be able to handle by looking at where they want to go. Curt and Amy both do this on their second try (no one makes it on their first). Lindsay was close on her second, only missing the corner and turning too soon. Teagan failed both runs when his foot got stuck between the pedals. Donna, however, has the worst run of the day, fishtailing wildly out of control when she mistakenly hits the gas on the turn, thinking it was the brakes (this run, in particular, would be referenced in following episodes and be one of the factors cited in the decision to ultimately expel her from the show).; Best Performer: Curt and Amy were the only two people who passed this challenge.; Worst Performer: Donna did the worst, as her fishtailed out of the course left tire trenches in the fields.; The vision tests reveal that, indeed, Emily has the worst vision among the contestants, with poor eyesight out of the right eye (which will require wearing glasses while driving). Ken, however, is also discovered to be colour-blind. When the judges convene, Curt and Amy make the shortlist—Amy because she showed no signs of breaking down and Curt because when not distracted, he could be very competent. Andrew, who is left with the deciding vote, believes that if Curt was to be let go, he could have small minor accidents moving forward, yet if Amy was to be let go, she could be in for a big accident. Because of this, Andrew casts his deciding vote in Curt's favour and Curt becomes the first graduate of the season.
3	"The Urge to Merge"	November 10, 2008
In this episode, the experts decide to address the contestants' difficulty with regards to merging into traffic.: Shoulder Checks: In a new challenge, the contestants must accelerate their car up to 60 km/h before encountering a sign. After reading the sign by shoulder checking, they must take the correct exit at a fork in the road. Contestants have five attempts, failing if they fail to make the shoulder check, making the wrong exit or hitting any obstacle. Teagan tries to cheat by removing his head restraint (though with it he passes on his third try), while Lindsay learns to "watch the road" when she passes on her second try (no one passes on their first try, while Ashley is the only other contestant to pass on her second). Emily, who is too vision-impaired to drive without glasses, makes it on her final attempt, but it is later discovered that she guessed an exit at random and had guessed right. Donna is too scared to go up to 60 km/h and she even failed a run at 50 km/h (but did pass a 30 km/h run, which would prove to be her only pass of the season before being removed from the show on safety grounds in the next episode). Amy fails all five runs, but discovers that, while making the shoulder check, she drifts her car to the right to overcompensate a natural leftwards drift when she turns her body.; The Traffic Circle Challenge: In this challenge, the contestants must drive a Jaguar and enter a traffic circle and pass six cars (two in the inner lane driving around at 15 km/h the other four in the outer lane at 25 km/h) before exiting, without exceeding 30 km/h in any part of the run. Ken finishes in four minutes with John barking orders at him, so when Andrew (driving the fifth car in this challenge) goes into the passenger seat (and have John in the fifth car), Ken finishes with a perfect run (including full lane change signalling, something he does not do at home) in three minutes. Teagan finishes without passing the sixth car, failing the challenge, while Amy, frightened by the challenge, cries her way through a perfect run in nine minutes. Ashley screams through her run, but manages to learn how to use her mirrors. Emily also passes with ease, while Donna has her left blinker on despite being in the inner lane. Lindsay also fails the challenge, as she does not do a full check-in four of her lane changes.; Road Signs: Dan tests the drivers on their road sign knowledge. Dan tests the drivers on their knowledge of road signs. Of the 15 questions asked, Amy got 7/15, while Donna posted the lowest score, with 3/15.; Public Lane Change: The contestants are put out onto public roads, where they must make 15 safe lane changes, as determined by her nominators. Lindsay is first to finish, while Ashley finds herself having driven with the parking brake down for half an hour and needs to get her car towed away. Emily and Amy are driven to the edge, but eventually finish. Donna runs into her old habits of running past stop signs, while Ken does not run into his old habits, even admitting to Andrew that the "old Ken" would have cut off others on a number of occasions.; In the end, Emily admits to needing more rehab, while Amy, Teagan and Donna are told that they will not graduate this episode. The experts and Andrew are deadlocked, though: Dan and Cam are willing to overlook Ashley's parking brake incident, while Ken has taken rehabilitation to heart (even admitting that he is doing this for his quadriplegic wife), which, in Dr. Gembora's and Phillipe's eyes makes him the best driver. However, Andrew, once again left with the deciding vote, places his behind Lindsay, but is pressured by the experts to change his vote and break the tie between Ken and Ashley. Thus, Andrew chooses Ken to be the next graduate, citing Ken's changing behaviour in the Public Lane Change Challenge as the reason.
4	"Shifty Manoeuvres"	November 17, 2008
The focus of this episode is driving manual transmission vehicles and each contestant is given lessons on how to drive stick-shift. Manual transmission cars will be used throughout this episode.: The Teeter-Totter: In this challenge, the contestants must balance their car on top of a teeter-totter. Ashley, who was self-taught in manual transmission at home (her F-350 is stick-shift), finishes the challenge quickly, though complaining the entire time that the car—in this case, a Honda Accord—is garbage, to the point Bryan asks for earplugs after the challenge. Emily and Donna also finish, but both admit that they may have lucked out. Teagan (the only male nominee remaining after Ken graduated last episode) and Amy are also given different cars—Teagan (given a more powerful Pontiac Sunfire because he too drives stick-shift at home) and Amy (given an Audi S6 due to her confidence issues). Teagan finishes, though he burns the clutch the entire time, while Amy is the only one not to finish, managing to kill her car and stalling 26 times just trying to get over a speed bump in third gear alone.; The Water-Tank Challenge: In the annual tradition, contestants must navigate through an obstacle course while having a roof-mounted pool of water on their car (this time, it is a stick-shift military vehicle as Cam notes). Notably, after three straight seasons where he stayed virtually dry, Andrew also gets soaked (losing 20 litres (5.3 US gal)), earning the ridicule of the show's crew. However, despite getting soaked and earning the ridicule of the crew, Andrew still fares better than the contestants—Scott is so soaked from Emily's bad driving that he leaves the challenge without his shirt, while Lindsay is forced to repeat a portion. Ashley also screams throughout her ride. However, the most serious news comes from Donna: having failed a straightaway portion, she repeats it, only to suffer an angina attack at the end of the straightaway when a fake taxi appears out of nowhere. For her, the challenge is aborted, and Dan and Cam are compelled through their positions as a certified driving instructor and a police officer, respectively, to call for reviews of her license based upon her medical condition.; Straight to 60: In this challenge, contestants must drive straight up to 60 km/h in standard transmission, with Andrew in the passenger's seat. Though five challenges finish quickly (Andrew having to tell Lindsay and Amy to not drive with the parking brake on), Andrew is nervous throughout, due to Donna's heart condition and her upcoming turn in the challenge, to the point of Andrew refusing to let Donna take the challenge (as Andrew explains, the challenges are designed to induce stress so that the contestants learn how to resolve the situations). Andrew convinces Donna not to do the challenge, as her heart condition continues to be examined.; Instead of Donna's run, Andrew discusses Donna's driving problems, at one point taking her back to the scene of her out-of-control spinout from the Icy Corner challenge. Donna is taken to the courtroom (the experts are not present) and shown video replays of her performances in the challenges thus far, after which Andrew returns her driving license. When asked what she intends to do next, Donna replies she intends to keep driving, only slower; surprisingly, despite having nominated her out of safety concerns, Claude shares her resolve. However, Andrew tells her that as far as he and the experts are concerned, Donna is the worst driver they have ever seen on the show (at the time of this episode's release though), she should never drive again, and due to her health issues (along with her effectively falsifying her medical form by not declaring them), she is being sent home immediately. Afterwards, Andrew and the panel agree that Donna will be sent home in what Andrew terms an "anti-graduation"; she is taken away by limo and is last heard repeating she plans to keep driving, but slower. Andrew, in narration, indicates that months after filming, Donna's license was still being reviewed by the province of Ontario. However, after leaving the show, Donna sent an e-mail stating, "I'm going to lose my license thanks to your damn show" (whether she actually did lose her license is not stated, though it's heavily implied she did). On March 1, 2022, Donna died, aged 75.
5	"A Turn For the Worst"	November 24, 2008
The five remaining contestants work on their skills in making smooth turns at the Driver Rehabilitation Centre. At the end of the previous episode, it was revealed that all four women remaining normally wear poor driving shoes to drive, which can be a hazard. Thus, all four women were ordered to do every subsequent challenge in "driving shoes.": Driving Distracted: Each of the remaining drivers must drive clockwise in a circle while having to perform several tasks (including answering the phone, reading out of a driver's manual, operating an electric shaver and drinking Gatorade) while maintaining speed. For Ashley, Bryan himself may be a distraction, as she nearly breaks down (and eventually gets her revenge by dumping her bottle of Gatorade in his lap). Lindsay realizes that text messaging while driving (which she does as part of her job) is a particular problem, as it could be outlawed in her jurisdiction (it is already illegal in every province east of Ontario except for PEI). Mat also gets a laugh at Teagan's expense when a collision with a barricade results in Teagan spilling Gatorade all over himself. Dan mentions that accident odds increase 100% per teenage passenger. Emily's problems are compounded by her poor vision (stopping in the middle of the course to answer the phone). Amy, who uses cigarettes to calm herself on the road, learns that even lighting up could be dangerous. This challenge is undertaken as an education measure and is not considered part of the "competition" aspect, so there are no winners or losers. All of the drivers eventually hit the barricades on the course.; The Snake: The episode's showcase challenge has the drivers move through a tight obstacle course through various slopes (upwards, downwards and to the sides). Ashley, scheduled to go first, is delayed because she did not bring flats, making Lindsay go first. Lindsay finishes faster than Andrew, but hits nine things. Emily falls off the track many times (requiring the crew to lift the car back onto the track). Teagan, who navigated the course on his skateboard with ease, slowly pulses his way through the course. He admits that a few more similar courses could improve his skills. Amy manages to remain calm after falling off the track on the first two turns and manages to finish the rest of the course without hitting anything. When Ashley returns, she finishes the course in 90 seconds with minimal error, the fastest out of any of the contestants, perplexing the experts, so Andrew challenges Ashley to do the course in reverse. Ashley promptly breaks down, arguing with Bryan, taking more than 15 minutes to round the first turn. However, Bryan manages to calm her down after that ordeal at the end when she gives up going in reverse.; Swerve and Avoid: In this episode's lesson, Philippe teaches the contestants to swerve, emphasizing to never brake while swerving. The contestants have three attempts to accelerate to 35 km/h (originally 40 km/h, but lowered at the last moment) and swerve in the direction opposite where a fake taxi appears, either to the left or the right. Amy, going first, fails her three runs (the first when she swerved towards the fake taxi, the second one when she was confused by the absence of either fake taxi, the third by swerving too wide). Emily also fails her three runs, partly due to her poor vision and partly due to poor cornering. Ashley, motivated by her son's first birthday at the end of the week (which she will miss if she does not graduate this episode), also fails her three runs, driving into the fake cab every time. She is also there to watch Lindsay fail her three runs (once while underspeed). Teagan also fails his three runs from oversteering.; The fact that all five failed the Swerve and Avoid challenge makes the experts' choice of whom to graduate difficult and Andrew himself is not comfortable with graduating anyone. Emily admits that she had owned glasses ten years ago (when she was still in China) and has since stopped wearing them, but agrees to allow the show to arrange an eye exam for her. Ashley admits that her emotions are getting the best of her. Teagan admits his issue may simply be inexperience. Amy admits disappointment in her challenges, but still admits that there is improvement to be had. The experts shortlist comes down to Lindsay and Ashley, with the panel split between the two. Andrew, in the end, declares that Lindsay was the better of the two and even had a graduation in the bag before the Swerve and Avoid (which would have been the second consecutive season to graduate someone in the fifth episode), but because she failed, no one graduates this episode.
6	"It's All Reverse"	December 1, 2008
The focus on this episode is on driving in reverse.: Reverse Flick: Phillippe normally teaches the reverse flick (a modified J-turn) to prospective Quebec police officers. Today, inspired by Ed Porter (who spun wildly out of control in the same manner in the reversing race from the previous season), the contestants learn the same maneuvers and then, for their challenge, repeat them inside a confined space. Teagan and Amy fail their 10 attempts due to over-steering and under-speeding, respectively. On the other hand, Lindsay makes it on her first try, Ashley on her second and Emily on her third.; Canada's Worst Parking Lot: The annual non-race to park a car in an open parking space has all five contestants driving five different luxury vehicles, with the additional requirement of having to reverse into their parking spaces. Amy is first to park (beating Ashley to a space), followed by Ashley, Lindsay and Emily (with a parallel park). Teagan is left without a space.; The Cross: This challenge returns from the previous season, where drivers must reverse their car through all four points of the cross. Amy, who is performing the challenge on her wedding anniversary, scratches the car only once in her 19-minute run. Bryan is conspicuously quiet during Ashley's run, while Teagan struggles through his second half.; The Figure-Eight Challenge: In the new twist on an annual classic, the drivers must make three laps around a double-wide figure-eight course. Instead of driving with their nominators, however, the five drivers sit in the car together. Neither Lindsay nor Ashley hit anything, though Lindsay was faster through the course. Amy, now more confident, hit only three things. However, both Teagan's oversteering and Emily's poor vision caused them to hit many objects.; The experts agree that Lindsay and Ashley made the shortlist, though Phillippe gave Amy some consideration. The deciding factor is Lindsay's self-control with TJ in the car because, despite being the better technical driver, Ashley breaks down whenever Bryan is in the car. Therefore, Lindsay becomes the next graduate.
7	"Practice Makes Perfect"	December 8, 2008
The focus of this episode is mainly traditional challenges: drivers will learn how to perform donuts and drive with an attached trailer.: Eye of the Needle: The annual tradition returns, where contestants must drive through a series of arches at 50 km/h. Ashley does this on her first try, while it takes Teagan three attempts (the first two he failed from poor steering) and Amy four. Emily, due to her poor vision, fails all four runs. Fortunately for her, poor vision should not hinder her further, as her new glasses finally came in.; Trailer Driving: The lesson this episode is on how to drive with a trailer attached, which will be needed for this obstacle course challenge. The obstacle consists of a short course which includes a hairpin turn and a reverse into a final parking space. Teagan is fired up and finishes without hitting anything. Emily dramatically improves with her new glasses, while Ashley, encouraged by Dr. Gembora to have a more conciliatory attitude with Bryan, manages to do the course well up to the final parking. Amy, however, only manages when she tunes out Bob.; Donuts: The final challenge this episode has drivers making a wide donut around a fixed obstacle in a 1988 Ford Mustang. Teagan manages to make it after much perseverance (though Mat had to sit the challenge out due to neck pain), while Ashley and Amy also manage to finish (Amy while lapping the obstacle repeatedly, while Ashley having to throw Bryan out of the car). Emily fails all 50 attempts.; For Ashley, graduation is paramount: if she does not graduate, she will miss her son's first birthday. The experts agree that, though she may be the best driver, Ashley is still too volatile with Bryan. Also shortlisted by the experts is Amy (who finished a strong second in all three of the day's challenges) and Teagan (who had the best in two out of the three). The three-way split decision eventually ends up in Teagan's favour—a decision that does not go over well with any of the three ladies—and he becomes the penultimate graduate, leaving the Driver Rehabilitation Centre in a cab, guaranteeing an all-female finale, with Emily (who believes that she should have graduated, despite doing the worst in most of the challenges) refusing to hug Teagan. After the decision is passed, the girls laugh and ask simultaneously, "What the hell just happened?"
8	"The Verdict"	December 15, 2008
Regardless of who will be named Canada's Worst Driver, this is the first (and, as of 2018, only) time the final episode had an all-female finale, with Andrew himself even admitting at the beginning of the episode that this was never planned, it just happened to come to it (this was due to the fact that there were only three men in rehab—Curt, Ken and Teagan).: Straight Line with a Twist: The season finale kicks off with the Straight Line Challenge from the previous season, but with a (literal) twist in the middle. Contestants must accelerate a 1966 Ford Fairlane to 40 km/h between two concrete barriers with only 8 cm (3.1 in) clearance on either side. Ashley manages to calm down enough to finish after 21:23 (her second-to-last run was underspeed) thanks to the mantra "look where you want to go." Emily takes 41 attempts and, like Jason Zhang in the previous season, subsequently fails to make a real effort and never comes close to passing the challenge until her second-to-last attempt, not to mention she drove so erratically in her first run she ended up killing the engine. Andrew states that, had this challenge alone decided the title of Canada's Worst Driver, Emily would be awarded the trophy, while it only takes Amy (going last and thinking strategically to go slow in her practice run) 9:10 to finish (her first official run was underspeed).; Best Performer: Amy and Ashley were the only two people who passed this challenge, but Amy doing clearly better thanks to strategically going slow in her practice run.; Worst Performer: Emily was the worst, killing the engine on her first attempt.; The Mega-Challenge: The annual Mega-Challenge consists of three legs—a combined Eye of the Needle and slalom portion (done in the Chrysler 300 non-letter series), an Icy Corner and a Snake (done in the 1988 Ford Mustang) and a final obstacle course in reverse and the Teeter-Totter (done in the Porsche 928). All three manage to get trouble in the first leg, though Amy manages to recover somewhat in later legs. Ashley and Emily, however, had to have the course altered, with Ashley (performing the challenge on her son's birthday), forced to finish the Mega Challenge in the Porsche due to the Mustang's engine going dead, admitting after her frustrations boiled over that she may be Canada's Worst Driver. It takes her 109 minutes to finish, while it takes Emily 64 minutes.; Road Test: Drivers must navigate a course involving 25 turns through Toronto during Friday rush hour traffic, this time using Andrew's truck, a 1998 Mazda B4000, which was used for the previous season's Road Test, with the beginning and ending at Outer Harbour Marina Toronto. Emily's run is overly cautious, causing nine moving violations, all but one of which was for blocking traffic at the intersections of Lake Shore Boulevard West and Rees Street, Rees Street and Bremner Boulevard, Bremner Boulevard at the Rogers Centre parking lot entrance, King Street West and Simcoe Street, King Street West and University Avenue, Shuter Street and Mutual Street (committing two moving violations alone—blocking traffic and failing to stop), Front Street West and John Street (near the CBC studios) and Parliament Street and Front Street East. This would have not only totaled $990 in potential fines had she been caught (similar to that of Shannon Willemsen from the second season), but of the nine moving violations she committed, five would cause her to lose her license based on demerit points alone. Amy, who wants to address driving with Bob as a passenger, only makes six moving violations (two for running red lights—at the intersections of Yonge Street and College Street/Carlton Street and Dundas Street West and Spadina Avenue, a third for failure to yield at the intersection of Beverley Street and Dundas Street West and three more in one go—illegal lane change, failure to stop and blocking crosswalk—all at the intersection of Bremner Boulevard and Rees Street) that would total $660 in potential fines had she been caught, all while Bob plays the role of tourist sitting in the passenger seat. Finally, Amy stops while turning onto Queens Quay West from York Street. However, Amy admits that on the plus side, she was able to manage her nerves on the public roads compared to how she started rehab. Ashley's run is far worse—when told by Andrew to stick to the right and stay on Lake Shore Boulevard, she somehow manages to sweep her way onto the Gardiner Expressway. Her run slowly goes downhill after that to the point where, by the time she commits her third moving violation, dangerous driving as she turns onto University Avenue from College Street heading toward Queens Park, she starts believing she's the worst. She ultimately makes eight moving violations (including blocking traffic while trying to pass a parked car on Richmond Street West in front of the Entertainment One Studios and two illegal lane changes—at the intersections of Spadina Avenue and St. Andrew Street and University Avenue and Front Street West) that would not only cost her $1,120 in potential fines had she been caught, but also her license. In the final moments, the truck's alternator dies, forcing Andrew and Bryan to push the truck into the first parking spot available so as not to impede the flow of traffic, resulting in a $350 ticketable offense for parking in a marked disabled spot in front of the Dominion Public Building on Front Street West. As if that's not enough, during Ashley's run, in which a pedestrian sticks up his middle finger at Ashley and Bryan while stopped at a red light at the intersection of Dundas Street West and Spadina Avenue (leading Ashley to assume the pedestrian is going to ask for money and get in the truck with them despite there being no more room), Andrew meets (and ultimately chats with) two tourists from Belgium who are fans of the show's Belgian counterpart, Y'a pas pire conducteur.; In their final discussion, the experts immediately agree that while she still has some way to go, Amy is not Canada's Worst Driver, as she isn't fearful about driving anymore. Between Ashley and Emily, however, the experts were divided; Dan and Cam consider Emily to be the worst, feeling that her driving skills never showed any real improvement and that, aside from Donna, she was the worst challenge performer in every single episode this season. On the other hand, Philippe and Dr. Gembora feel that Ashley is the worst, noting that whereas Emily had at least finally agreed to address her bad eyesight by wearing glasses, Ashley made no attempt whatsoever to improve her bad temper or her relationship with Bryan and that, as superior as her technical skills are (and they're far superior to Emily's and even Amy's, for that matter), they would be of absolutely no help if she got into an accident through distraction or road rage. This leaves Andrew with the deciding vote, which swings in Emily's favour as, despite performing the worst in the Straight Line with a Twist Challenge, Ashley's performance in both the Mega-Challenge and the Road Test (which she couldn't even finish because the alternator in Andrew's truck died heading back to Outer Harbour Marina Toronto), means that Ashley is named Canada's Worst Driver and the fourth person (second woman) to be awarded the trophy. Emily fails to graduate, but is told by Andrew to keep wearing her glasses and she knows that the next step is to gain more driving skills. Ashley is clearly not too happy with the decision, not least because she leaves the Driver Rehabilitation Centre with her car on the back of a tow truck (the same one, in fact, that towed her challenge car after she left the parking brake on in the Public Lane Change challenge), but also to the point of refusing the trophy and wanting to move to another continent. However, Andrew does remind the viewers that, in a year's time, there will be more bad drivers and the Driver Rehabilitation Centre will be open once again, when someone else will be given the title of Canada's Worst Driver.
