= 24th Gemini Awards =

2009 awards for Canadian television

- Date: November 14, 2009
- Venue: Stampede Corral, Calgary
- Hosted by: Ron James

Television/radio coverage
- Network: Global, Showcase

The Academy of Canadian Cinema & Television's 24th Gemini Awards were held on November 14, 2009, to honour achievements in Canadian television. The awards show, which was hosted by Ron James, took place at the Stampede Corral in Calgary and was broadcast on Showcase and Global.

== Best Dramatic Series ==
- Flashpoint – Pink Sky Entertainment, Avamar Entertainment. Producers: Anne Marie La Traverse, Bill Mustos
- Being Erica – Temple Street Productions. Producers: David Fortier, Aaron Martin, Ivan Schneeberg, Jana Sinyor
- The Border – White Pine Pictures. Producers: Peter Raymont, David Barlow, Brian Dennis, Janet Maclean
- The Tudors – Peace Arch Entertainment, Reveille Productions, Working Title Films, Showtime Networks. Producers: Sheila Hockin, Morgan O’Sullivan
- ZOS: Zone of Separation – Whizbang Films, Sulari Productions. Producers: Paul Gross, Mario Azzopardi, Malcolm MacRury, Andrea Raffaghello, Frank Siracusa

== Best Dramatic Mini-Series ==
- Burn Up – Seven24 Films, Kudos. Producers: Tom Cox, Stephen Garrett
- Diamonds – Sienna Films, Alchemy Television, Buffalo Gal Pictures. Producers: Jennifer Kawaja, Liz Jarvis, Phyllis Laing, Philo Pieterse, Julia Sereny, Carrie Stein, Simon Vaughan, Nick Witkowski
- The Last Templar – Muse Entertainment. Producers: Michael Prupas, Robert Halmi Sr., Robert Halmi, Jr., Irene Litinsky
- XIII: The Series – Prodigy Pictures, Cipango. Producers: Jay Firestone, Thomas Anargyros, Edouard De Vesinne

== Best TV Movie ==
- Elijah – Anagram Pictures, Eagle Vision. Producers: Blake Corbet, Gigi Boyd, Kevin Eastwood, Christopher Leeson, Lisa Meeches, Mary Anne Waterhouse
- Céline – Barna-Alper Productions. Producers: Laszlo Barna, Steven Silver
- In a World Created by a Drunken God – Pyramid Productions. Producers: Kirstie McLellan Day, Larry Day
- Of Murder and Memory – Thump Inc., Oasis International. Producers: Ilana Frank, Semi Chellas, Daniel Iron, David Wellington
- The Secret of the Nutcracker – Joe Media Group. Producers: Matt Gillespie, Joe Novak, Shirley Vercruysse
- The Terrorist Next Door – Sarrazin Couture Entertainment, Forum Films. Producers: Pierre Sarrazin, Suzette Couture, Richard Lalonde, Susan Murdoch

== Best Comedy Program or Series ==
- Rick Mercer Report – CBC, Island Edge. Producers: Gerald Lunz, Rick Mercer
- Less Than Kind – Breakthrough Entertainment, Buffalo Gal Pictures. Producers: Phyllis Laing, Marvin Kaye, Ira Levy, Amy Marcella, Mark McKinney, Jan Peter Meyboom, Kirsten Scollie, Chris Sheasgreen, Peter Williamson
- Testees – Blueprint Entertainment. Producers: John Morayniss, Suzanne Berger, Kenny Hotz, Amy Marcella, Michael Rosenberg, Jonathan Walker
- This Hour Has 22 Minutes – Halifax Film Company, Canadian Broadcasting Corporation. Producers: Mark Farrell, Susan MacDonald, Jack Kellum, Jenipher Ritchie, Michael Donovan
- Three Chords from the Truth – Henry Less Productions. Producers: Henry Less, Steve Cochrane, Phyllis Ellis, Sissy Federer-Less, Adriana Maggs

== Best Music or Variety Program or Series ==
- So You Think You Can Dance Canada – Danse TV Productions. Producers: Sandra Faire, Milan Curry-Sharples, Trisa Dayot, Janet Lavack, Bronwyn Warren
- 2008 MuchMusic Video Awards – MuchMusic. Producers: John Kampilis, Bob Pagrach, Sheila Sullivan
- Juno Awards of 2009 – Canadian Academy of Recording Arts and Sciences, CTV Television Network. Producers: John Brunton, Melanie Berry, Barbara Bowlby, Louise Wood, Stephen Stohn
- 23rd Gemini Awards – Enter The Picture Entertainment, Academy of Canadian Cinema & Television. Producer: Lynn Harvey
- Canadian Comedy Awards – Best of the Fest – Mind's Eye Entertainment, Higher Ground Productions. Producers: Kevin DeWalt, Chas Hay, Tim Progosh

== Best Performing Arts Program or Series, or Arts Documentary Program or Series ==
- The Young Romantic – Rhombus Media. Producers: Niv Fichman, Jessica Daniel, Barbara Willis Sweete
- Caesar and Cleopatra – Melbar Entertainment Group. Producer: Barry Avrich
- Flicker – Makin' Movies, National Film Board of Canada. Producers: Maureen Judge, Anita Lee
- Toscanini: In His Own Words – Foundry Films, Idéale Audience. Producers: Daniel Iron, Hélène Le Cœur
- Vida Y Danza Cuba – Eccentric Things. Producer: Veronica Tennant

== Best Talk Series ==
- The Hour with George Stroumboulopoulos – Canadian Broadcasting Corporation. Producers: Jennifer Dettman, George Stroumboulopoulos, David Freeman
- The After Show – MTV. Producer: Garrett Wintrip, Pam de Montmorency, Alex Sopinka
- Steven and Chris – Canadian Broadcasting Corporation. Producers: Jennifer Dettman, Krista Look, Susan Taylor

== Best Reality Program or Series ==
- Dragons' Den – 2waytraffic, Canadian Broadcasting Corporation. Producers: Tracie Tighe, Stuart Coxe, Lisa Gabriele
- Disband – The Homecoming – MuchMusic. Producers: Mark Myers, Chris Barrow, Jason Ford, John Kampilis
- GoldMind – WestWind Pictures. Producers: Mary Darling, Kim Brouwer, Clark Donnelly
- Project Runway Canada – Insight Productions. Producers: John Brunton, Barbara Bowlby, Andrea Gabourie
- The Week the Women Went – Paperny Entertainment. Producers: Cal Shumiatcher, Trevor Hodgson, Brad Brough, David Paperny, Ed Hatton, Peter Waal

== Best General/Human Interest Series ==
- X-Weighted – Anaid Productions. Producers: Margaret Mardirossian, David Way, Candice Tipton, Helen Schmidt
- Austin Stevens Adventures – Cineflix, Tigress Productions. Producers: Samantha Linton, Graham Booth, Katherine Buck, Andrew Jackson, Sarah Peat, John Vandervelde
- Buy Me – Whalley-Abbey Media. Producers: Debbie Travis, Jean-François Monette, Hans Rosenstein
- Mayday – Cineflix. Producers: Simon Lloyd, Larry Bambrick, Katherine Buck, Alex Bystram, Greg Lanning, Samantha Linton, Glen Salzman, John Vandervelde
- Monster Moves – Cineflix, Windfall Films. Producers: Samantha Linton, Katherine Buck, David Duggan, Carlo Massarella, Lisa Rumley, John Vandervelde

== Donald Brittain Award for Best Social/Political Documentary Program ==
- Tiger Spirit – Storyline Entertainment. Producers: Ed Barreveld, Anita Lee, Min Sook Lee
- Air India 182 – Withrow Road Pictures. Producers: David York, Sturla Gunnarsson
- Bploi Wai Dtaai: Leave Her to Die – Think Positive Productions. Producers: Antonia Thomson, Sean Buckley
- Norm – Moondat Productions. Producers: Kent Nason, Teresa MacInnes
- Triage: Dr. James Orbinski's Humanitarian Dilemma – White Pine Pictures. Producers: Peter Raymont, Silva Basmajian

== Best Documentary Series ==
- CBC News: The Lens – Canadian Broadcasting Corporation. Producers: Angelina Stokman, Catherine Olsen, Charlotte Odele, Andrew Johnson
- The Adventurers – 90th Parallel Productions. Producers: Gordon Henderson, Michael Allder, Andrew Gregg
- Ancestors in the Attic – Primitive Entertainment. Producers: Dugald Maudsley, Kristina McLaughlin, Michael McMahon
- Survivorman – Cream Productions, Wilderness Spirit Productions. Producers: Les Stroud, David Brady
- The View from Here – TVOntario. Producer: Jane Jankovic

== Best History Documentary Program ==
- China's Earthquake: The People In the Pictures – Canadian Broadcasting Corporation. Producers: Susan Teskey, Diana Dai
- Turning Points of History – Dark Tourism – Barna-Alper Productions. Producers: Laszlo Barna, Steven Silver
- Death or Canada – Ballinran Productions, Tile Films. Producers: Craig Thompson, Dave Farrell, Stephen Rooke
- Who Sank the Titanic? – Handel Productions, Pioneer Productions. Producers: Alan Handel, Stuart Carter

== Best Biography Documentary Program ==
- Peace Warrior – Dreamfilm Productions. Producers: Sue Ridout, Sara Darling
- The Bush Years – Canadian Broadcasting Corporation. Producers: Terence McKenna, Michelle Gagnon
- The Man Who Crossed the Sahara – Bravo!. Producer: Korbett Matthews
- The Pellatt Newsreel – Lush Art & Entertainment. Producers: Barbra Cooper, Michael Leclair

== Best Science, Technology, Nature, Environment or Adventure Documentary Program ==
- The Disappearing Male – Red Apple Productions. Producers: Rachel Low, Alan Mendelsohn
- The Body Machine – MB Media Productions. Producers: Mary Barroll, Malcolm Brinkworth
- Mighty Ships – Resolute – Exploration Production. Producers: Kathryn Oughtred, Phil Desjardins, Richard O'Regan
- The Musical Brain – Matter Of Fact Media. Producer: Vanessa Dylyn
- Secrets of the Dinosaur Mummy – Myth Merchant Films, Midcanada Entertainment. Producers: Michael Jorgensen, Kevin Dunn

== Best News Information Series ==
- the fifth estate – CBC. Producers: Sally Reardon, David Studer
- 16:9: The Bigger Picture – Global Television Network. Producer: Dominic Sciullo
- The Agenda – TVOntario. Producer: Dan Dunsky
- CBC News: Sunday – Canadian Broadcasting Corporation. Producers: Patsy Pehleman, Michael Kearns

== Best News Magazine Segment ==
- The National/CBC News – The Taser Test – Canadian Broadcasting Corporation. Producers: Frédéric Zalac, Kris Fleerackers, Doug Husby, George Laszuk, Alex Shprintsen
- The National/CBC News – What A Waste – Canadian Broadcasting Corporation. Producers: Patrick Brown, Sheldon Beldick, Lynn Burgess, Liz Rosche
- Marketplace – Power of Persuasion – Canadian Broadcasting Corporation. Producers: Kathleen Coughlin, Kathryn Dickson, Wendy Mesley, Jasmin Tuffaha
- 16:9: The Bigger Picture – Little Miracles – Global. Producer: Mary Garofalo
- CBC News: Sunday – The Great Wall Street Swindle – Canadian Broadcasting Corporation. Producers: Bruce Livesey, Farid Haerinejad, Evan Solomon

== Best Newscast ==
- The National/CBC News – Canadian Broadcasting Corporation. Producers: Mark Harrison, Mary Mather, Heather McLennan, Fred Parker, Greg Reaume
- CBC News at Six Manitoba – CBC Winnipeg. Producers: Melanie Verhaeghe, Chris Armstrong, Kevin Cox, Brad Lillies, Terry Stapleton
- Global National – Global News. Producers: Kenton Boston, Neil Fitzpatrick, Jason Keel, Bryan Mullan, Kevin Newman

== Best News Special Event Coverage ==
- Global National – Decision Canada, Election Night – Global News. Producers: Kenton Boston, Neil Fitzpatrick, Marc Riddell, Doriana Temolo, Scott Hinde
- CBC News: The Obama Visit – Canadian Broadcasting Corporation. Producers: Gerry Buffet, Mark Bulgutch, Sharon Musgrave, Fred Parker
- CBC News: Canada Votes – Election Night – Canadian Broadcasting Corporation. Producers: Mark Bulgutch, Fred Parker, Bob Weiers
- CBC News: Newfoundland Crash – Canadian Broadcasting Corporation. Producers: Peter Gullage, Joanne McPherson, Angela Naus

== Best Lifestyle/Practical Information Series ==
- Holmes in New Orleans – Mirno Productions. Producers: Mike Holmes, Peter Kettlewell, Michael Quast
- Dirty Business – Primevista Television. Producer: Michael Prini
- Maxed Out – RTR Media. Producers: Kit Redmond, Carolynne Bell, Anne Francis, Hans Rosenstein, Debbie Travis
- Restaurant Makeover – Tricon Films & Television. Producers: Andrea Gorfolova, Shaam Makan
- Which Way To... – Which Way To Productions. Producers: Christopher Eagar, Stephen Eagar, Jeffrey Eagar, Jen Mitchell

== Best Lifestyle/Practical Information Segment ==
- 16:9: The Bigger Picture – Rays of Rash, Dirty Energy – Global). Producer/Correspondent: Allison Vuchnich and Director of Photography: Kirk Neff
- Daily Planet – Flatmobile – Discovery Channel. Producer: Cindy Bahadur
- Daily Planet – Eyeborg – Discovery Channel. Producer: Cindy Bahadur
- Daily Planet – Sydney Tar Ponds – Discovery Channel. Producer: Frances MacKinnon
- CBC News: Sunday – The Exorcist – Canadian Broadcasting Corporation. Producers: Leonardo Palleja, Michael Dorn, Eric Foss, Carole MacNeil

== Best Animated Program or Series ==
- Life's a Zoo – Cuppa Coffee Studios, Teletoon. Producer: Adam Shaheen
- Jibber Jabber – Jibber Jabber Toons, Northwest Imaging & FX. Producers: David Bowes, Jim Corbett
- Rick & Steve: The Happiest Gay Couple in All the World – Cuppa Coffee Studios. Producers: Adam Shaheen, Christine Davis, Jaelyn Galbraith
- RollBots – Amberwood Entertainment. Producers: Jonathan Wiseman, Chantal Ling, Sheldon Wiseman

== Best Pre-School Program or Series ==
- Kids Canada – Canadian Broadcasting Corporation. Producers: Marie McCann, Phil McCordic, Erin Curtin, Nadine Henry, Patty Sullivan, Sid Bobb
- Are We There Yet?: World Adventure – Sinking Ship Entertainment. Producers: Blair Powers, J. J. Johnson, Matt Bishop
- Gisèle's Big Backyard – Get Ready for School – TVOntario. Producers: Kathilee Porter, Gisèle Corinthios, Pat Ellingson, Paul Gardner
- The Mighty Jungle – Halifax Film Company. Producers: Michael Donovan, Charles Bishop, Cheryl Hassen, Beth Stevenson, Katrina Walsh

== Best Children’s or Youth Fiction Program or Series ==
- Life with Derek – Shaftesbury Films. Producers: Christina Jennings, Daphne Ballon, Jeff Biederman, Suzanne French, Scott Garvie, Laurie McLarty
- Instant Star – Epitome Pictures. Producers: Linda Schuyler, Stephanie Williams, David Lowe, Stephen Stohn
- The Latest Buzz – Decode Entertainment. Producers: Steven DeNure, Neil Court, Kevin May, Brent Piaskoski, Beth Stevenson

== Best Children's or Youth Non-Fiction Program or Series ==
- Mark’s Moments – TVOntario. Producers: Marney Malabar, Daniel Bourré, Pat Ellingson, Mark Sykes
- Aquateam – Arcadia Entertainment. Producers: Leanne Chisholm, John Wesley Chisholm
- Mystery Hunters – Apartment 11 Productions. Producers: Jonathan Finkelstein, Jason Levy
- Sci Q – Exploration Production. Producers: Edwina Follows, Andrew Burnstein, Jane Gilbert, Dave Litman

== Best Sportscast (National or Local) ==
- SportsCentre – TSN. Producers: Ken Volden, Steve Argintaru
- Score Tonight – The Score Television Network. Producer: Jon Coleman

== Best Sports Analysis or Commentary Program, Series or Segment ==
- Hockey Day in Canada 2009 – CBC Sports. Producer: Michael Dodson
- 2008 Grey Cup Pre-game on TSN – TSN. Producers: Ken Volden, Bill Dodson
- Brodeur: A Winner Above All – NHL Network. Producers: Sam Cicirello, Mark Jacobson, Marc Macdonald, Tom Masters, John Shannon
- Countdown To Beijing – Canadian Broadcasting Corporation. Producer: Christian Cote

== Best Sports Feature Segment ==
- 2008 Beijing Olympics – Canadian Broadcasting Corporation. Producers: Natalie Tedesco, Mark Kelley, Catherine Legge, Aileen McBride
- Score Tonight – The Score Celebrates Black History Month – The Score Television Network. Producers: DJ Bennett, Kevin Lavie
- Hardcore Hockey Talk – Minor Hockey, Major Issues. Producers: Sarah Meehan, Jake Thompson
- 2008 Grey Cup Pre-game on TSN – TSN. Producers: Josh Shiaman, Ken Volden

== Best Live Sporting Event ==
- 2008 Beijing Olympics – Canadian Broadcasting Corporation. Producers: Trevor Pilling, Don Peppin
- 2008 Grey Cup Pre-game on TSN – TSN. Producers: Jim Marshall, Jon Hynes
- 2009 World Junior Ice Hockey Championships Gold Medal Game – TSN. Producers: Jim Marshall, Jon Hynes

== Best Cross-Platform Project ==
- CBC News: Ormiston Online – Canadian Broadcasting Corporation. Producers: Susan Ormiston, Allison Brachman, Karl Delgadillo, Paul Hambelton, Jeff Wyonch
- Being Erica Interactive – Temple Street Productions. Producers: Shawn Bailey, David Fortier, Jessie Gabe, Ivan Schneeberg
- One Million Acts of Green Interactive – The Hour with George Stroumboulopoulos – Canadian Broadcasting Corporation. Producers: Jennifer Dettman, Julie List, Alex Liu, Paul McGrath, George Stroumboulopoulos
- I Prophesy: The Future Revealed Interactive – Henry Less Productions. Producers: James Milward, Sissy Federer, Henry Less
- Pop It! Interactive – Hop To It Productions. Producers: Susan Nation, Nina Beveridge

== Best Direction in a Dramatic Program or Mini-Series ==
- Jerry Ciccoritti – The Terrorist Next Door (Sarrazin Couture Entertainment/Forum Films)
- Paolo Barzman – The Last Templar (Muse Entertainment)
- Peter Svatek – The Christmas Choir (Muse Entertainment/Towers Pictures)
- David Wellington – Of Murder and Memory (Thump Inc./Oasis International)
- Andy Wilson – Diamonds (Sienna Films, Alchemy Television, Buffalo Gal Pictures)

== Best Direction in a Dramatic Series ==
- Kelly Makin – Flashpoint – Planets Aligned (Pink Sky Entertainment/Avamar Entertainment)
- Steven A. Adelson – Sanctuary – Instinct (My Plastic Badger Productions)
- John Fawcett – The Border – Going Dark (White Pine Pictures)
- Chris Grismer – Being Erica – Leo (Temple Street Productions)
- Jeremy Podeswa – The Tudors, Episode 201 (Peace Arch Entertainment/Reveille Productions/Working Title Films/Showtime Networks)

== Best Direction in a News Information Program or Series ==
- Harvey Cashore – the fifth estate – The Chess Master (CBC)
- Catherine Clark – Marketplace – Miracle Makers or Money Takers (Canadian Broadcasting Corporation)
- Morris Karp – the fifth estate – Powerless (CBC)
- Tamar Weinstein – the fifth estate – Staying Alive (CBC)

== Best Direction in a Documentary Program ==
- Robert Cornellier – Black Wave: The Legacy of the Exxon Valdez (Macumba Doc)
- Karen Cho – Seeking Refuge (InformAction)
- Annette Mangaard – General Idea: Art, AIDS and the Fin de Siècle (General Idea Productions)
- Kent Nason, Teresa MacInnes – Norm (Moondat Productions)
- John Zaritsky – The Wild Horse Redemption (Point Grey Pictures)

== Best Direction in a Documentary Series ==
- Michael McNamara – Driven By Vision – Of Castles, Kings and Jesters (Markham Street Films)
- Ryszard Hunka – The Great Food Revolution – 24 Hours, 24 Million Meals: Feeding New York City (CBC)
- Liam O'Rinn – The Great Food Revolution – The Great Food Revolution (CBC)
- Les Stroud – Survivorman – Papua New Guinea (Cream Productions/Wilderness Spirit Productions)
- Hadley Obodiac – The Nature of Things – Living City: A Critical Guide (CBC)

== Best Direction in a Comedy Program or Series ==
- Kelly Makin – Less Than Kind – The Daters (Breakthrough Entertainment)/Buffalo Gal Pictures)
- James Dunnison – Less Than Kind – Fun (Breakthrough Entertainment)/Buffalo Gal Pictures)
- Samir Rehem – Testees – Herfume (Blueprint Entertainment)
- Henry Sarwer-Foner – Less Than Kind – Pakikisama (Breakthrough Entertainment)/Buffalo Gal Pictures)
- Shawn Thompson – Less Than Kind – French is My Kryptonite (Breakthrough Entertainment)/Buffalo Gal Pictures)
- Shawn Thompson – Billable Hours – A Mansion for All Seasons (Shaw Media/Temple Street Productions)

== Best Direction in a Variety Program or Series ==
- Shelagh O'Brien – Just for Laughs Gala Series, Show 1 (Just for Laughs Comedy Festival/Les Films Rozon)
- Sandra Faire – So You Think You Can Dance Canada – Toronto Auditions (Danse TV Productions)
- Dave Russell – How Do You Solve a Problem Like Maria? – Performance 6 (Temple Street Productions)

== Best Direction in a Performing Arts Program or Series ==
- Barbara Willis Sweete – The Young Romantic (Rhombus Media)
- Elise Swerhone – Ballet High (Merit Motion Pictures)
- Veronica Tennant – Vida Y Danza Cuba (Eccentric Things)

== Best Direction in a Lifestyle/Practical Information Program or Series ==
- Graham Booth – Austin Stevens Adventures – In the Shadow of Armoured Giants (Cineflix/Tigress Productions)
- Andre Dupuis – Departures – Libya
- Daniel Gelfant – Chef School – Something to Prove (Red Apple Entertainment)
- Dugald McLaren – French Food at Home – The Chateau Dinner: A French Food at Home Special (Ocean Entertainment)
- Michelle Métivier – Holmes in New Orleans – Going Home (Mirno Productions)

== Best Direction in a Reality Program or Series ==
- Daniel Oron – Reality Obsessed – The Ultimate Casting Tape (Peace Point Entertainment Group)
- Justin Harding – Keys to the VIP – Redemption (Alpha Male Productions/Buck Productions/The Comedy Network)
- Itamar Weisz – GoldMind – Gambler’s Luck (WestWind Pictures)

== Best Direction in an Animated Program or Series ==
- George Elliott, Joey So – RollBots – Training Day (Amberwood Entertainment)
- David Bowes – Jibber Jabber – Race to the Red Planet, Pride of Frankenstein. (Jibber Jabber Toons/Northwest Imaging & FX)
- Dennis Jackson – Wapos Bay – Raiders of the Lost Art (Karma Film)
- Cameron Lizotte – Wapos Bay – Raven Power (Karma Film)
- Kevin Micallef – Grossology – Swamp Gas (Nelvana)

== Best Direction in a Children's or Youth Program or Series ==
- Eleanore Lindo – Degrassi: The Next Generation – Fight the Power (Bell Media/Epitome Pictures)
- René Dowhaniuk – The Next Star – The Duet (Tricon Films & Television)
- Alex Khan – Think Big – Getting it Right (Breakthrough Entertainment)
- Michael Mabbott – Life with Derek – March Break (Shaftesbury Films)
- Pat Williams – Instant Star – Us and Them (Epitome Pictures)

== Best Direction in a Live Sporting Event ==
- Ron Forsythe – Hockey Night in Canada – 2009 Bridgestone NHL Winter Classic (CBC Sports)
- Chris Elias – 2009 Canadian Figure Skating Championships (CBC Sports)
- Paul Hemming – 2008 Grey Cup Pre-game on TSN (TSN)

== Best Writing in a Dramatic Program or Mini-Series ==
- Blake Corbet – Elijah (Anagram Pictures/Eagle Vision)
- Donald Martin – Céline (Barna-Alper Productions)
- Tony Marchant – Diverted (CBC)
- David Vainola – Diamonds (Sienna Films, Alchemy Television, Buffalo Gal Pictures)
- David Wolkove – XIII: The Series (Prodigy Pictures/Cipango)

== Best Writing in a Dramatic Series ==
- Brad Wright- Stargate Atlantis – The Shrine (Acme Shark Productions/Sony Pictures Television)
- Lori Spring – Murdoch Mysteries – I, Murdoch (Shaftesbury Films/Rogers Media/UKTV)
- Mark Ellis, Stephanie Morgenstern – Flashpoint – Haunting the Barn (Pink Sky Entertainment/Avamar Entertainment)
- Michael Hirst – The Tudors, Episode 205 (Peace Arch Entertainment/Reveille Productions/Working Title Films/Showtime Networks)
- Floyd Kane – Soul – Fathers and Daughters (Halifax Film Company)

== Best Writing in a Comedy or Variety Program or Series ==
- Adam Reid, Max Reid – Billable Hours – A Mansion for All Seasons (Shaw Media/Temple Street Productions)
- Matt Alden, Dana Andersen, Sheldon Elter, Jeff Halaby, Howie Miller, Ryan Parker – Caution: May Contain Nuts, Episode 3 (Mosaic Entertainment)
- Mark De Angelis, David Guy Mackenzie, George Westerholm – The 29th Genie Awards (Global)
- Kenny Hotz, Derek Harvie – Testees – Memory Loss (Blueprint Entertainment)
- Mark McKinney – Less Than Kind – Careers Day (Breakthrough Entertainment)/Buffalo Gal Pictures)

== Best Writing in an Information Program or Series ==
- Gillian Findlay – the fifth estate – A Death in the Family (CBC)
- David Freeman, Paul Bates, Diana Frances, Ken Hegan, Nick McCabe-Lokos, Carman Melville, Scott Montgomery, Adam Nicholls, Randy Potash, George Stroumboulopoulos – The Hour with George Stroumboulopoulos (CBC)
- Ryan Leigh – "Ink: Alter Egos Exposed – Villains" (Summerhill Entertainment)
- Bob McKeown – the fifth estate – The Code (CBC)

== Best Writing in a Documentary Program or Series ==
- Tracey Deer – Club Native (Rezolution Pictures/NFB)
- Araz Artinian – The Genocide in Me
- Robert Cornellier, Paul Carvalho – Black Wave: The Legacy of the Exxon Valdez (Macumba Doc)
- Sheona McDonald – Capturing a Short Life (Dimestore Productions)
- Larry Weinstein, Harvey Sachs – Toscanini: In His Own Words (Foundry Films/Idéale Audience)

== Best Writing in a Children's or Youth's Program or Series ==
- Steven Westren – My Friend Rabbit – Frog On A Log (Nelvana/Qubo)
- Jeff Biederman – Life with Derek – Just Friends (Shaftesbury Films)
- Richard Clark – Grossology – The New Recruits (Nelvana)
- Sean Jara – The Latest Buzz – The First Impressions Issue (Decode Entertainment)
- Victor Nicolle, Sandy Flanagan, Dennis Heaton – Jibber Jabber – Night of the Werewolf, Enter the Jelly (Jibber Jabber Toons/Northwest Imaging & FX)

== Best Performance by an Actor in a Leading Role in a Dramatic Program or Mini-Series ==
- David Suchet – Diverted (CBC)
- Trevor Duplessis – In a World Created by a Drunken God (Pyramid Productions)
- Chenier Hundal – The Terrorist Next Door (Sarrazin Couture Entertainment/Forum Films)
- Carlo Rota – Othello, The Tragedy of the Moor (Governor Films)
- Bradley Whitford – Burn Up (Seven24 Films/Kudos)

== Best Performance by an Actress in a Leading Role in a Dramatic Program or Mini-Series ==
- Christine Ghawi – Céline (Barna-Alper Productions)
- Judy Davis – Diamonds (Sienna Films, Alchemy Television, Buffalo Gal Pictures)
- Joanne Kelly – Diamonds (Sienna Films, Alchemy Television, Buffalo Gal Pictures)
- Rachel Marcus – Booky's Crush (Platt Productions, Shaftesbury Films, CBC)
- Chandra West – Of Murder and Memory (Thump Inc./Oasis International)

== Best Performance by an Actor in a Continuing Leading Dramatic Role ==
- Enrico Colantoni – Flashpoint – Who’s George? (Pink Sky Entertainment/Avamar Entertainment)
- Hugh Dillon – Flashpoint – Haunting the Barn (Pink Sky Entertainment/Avamar Entertainment)
- Robin Dunne – Sanctuary – Requiem (My Plastic Badger Productions)
- Daniel Kash – The Line – Episode 102 (The Nightingale Company)
- Ron White – The Line – Episode 102 (The Nightingale Company)

== Best Performance by an Actress in a Continuing Leading Dramatic Role ==
- Erin Karpluk – Being Erica – Dr. Tom (Temple Street Productions)
- Natalie Dormer – The Tudors, Episode 210 (Peace Arch Entertainment/Reveille Productions/Working Title Films/Showtime Networks)
- Amy Jo Johnson – Flashpoint – Planets Aligned (Pink Sky Entertainment/Avamar Entertainment)
- Andrea Menard – Rabbit Fall – Hit and Run (Angel Entertainment)
- Amanda Tapping – Sanctuary – Requiem (My Plastic Badger Productions)

== Best Performance by an Actor in a Guest Role Dramatic Series ==
- Henry Czerny – Flashpoint – First in Line (Pink Sky Entertainment/Avamar Entertainment)
- Damir Andrei – Being Erica – The Secret of Now (Temple Street Productions)
- Nicholas Campbell – Flashpoint – Who’s George (Pink Sky Entertainment/Avamar Entertainment)
- Mpho Koaho – Flashpoint – Never Kissed a Girl (Pink Sky Entertainment/Avamar Entertainment)
- Ron Lea – Flashpoint – Haunting the Barn (Pink Sky Entertainment/Avamar Entertainment)

== Best Performance by an Actress in a Guest Role Dramatic Series ==
- Tatiana Maslany – Flashpoint – Planets Aligned (Pink Sky Entertainment/Avamar Entertainment)
- Daisy Beaumont – The Border – Floral Tribute (White Pine Pictures)
- Kristin Booth – Flashpoint – Backwards Day (Pink Sky Entertainment/Avamar Entertainment)
- Sarah Gadon – Flashpoint – Attention Shoppers (Pink Sky Entertainment/Avamar Entertainment)
- Anna Silk – Being Erica – Everything She Wants (Temple Street Productions)

== Best Performance by an Actor in a Featured Supporting Role in a Dramatic Series ==
- Mpho Koaho – Soul – Seducing Spirits, Exile (Halifax Film Company)
- Jonny Harris – Murdoch Mysteries – Big Murderer On Campus, Convalescence (Shaftesbury Films/Rogers Media/UKTV)
- David Alpay – The Tudors, Episodes 207 & 209 (Peace Arch Entertainment/Reveille Productions/Working Title Films/Showtime Networks)
- Christopher Heyerdahl – Sanctuary – The Five, Revelations Part 2 (My Plastic Badger Productions)
- Wes Williams – The Line – Episodes 106 & 107 (The Nightingale Company)

== Best Performance by an Actress in a Featured Supporting Role in a Dramatic Series ==
- Gabrielle Miller – Robson Arms – Baby? What Baby?, Mean Girls (Omnifilm Entertainment/Creative Atlantic Communications)
- Lolita Davidovich – ZOS: Zone of Separation – Bred in the Bone, The Laws (Whizbang Films/Sulari Productions)
- Catherine Disher – The Border – The Sweep, Unacceptable Risk (White Pine Pictures)
- Tasha Lawrence – The Line – Episodes 104 & 106 (The Nightingale Company)
- Reagan Pasternak – Being Erica – The Secret of Now, Such a Perfect Day (Temple Street Productions)

== Best Performance by an Actor in a Featured Supporting Role in a Dramatic Program or Mini-Series ==
- Hugh Dillon – Of Murder and Memory (Thump Inc./Oasis International)
- Dylan Everett – Booky's Crush (Platt Productions, Shaftesbury Films, CBC)
- Reda Guerinik – The Terrorist Next Door (Sarrazin Couture Entertainment/Forum Films)
- Stuart Hughes – Booky's Crush (Platt Productions, Shaftesbury Films, CBC)

== Best Performance by an Actress in a Featured Supporting Role in a Dramatic Program or Mini-Series ==
- Barbara Hershey – Anne of Green Gables: A New Beginning (Sullivan Entertainment)
- Kaniehtiio Horn – Moccasin Flats: Redemption (Big Soul Productions/Stephen Onda Productions)
- Louise Rose – Diamonds (Sienna Films, Alchemy Television, Buffalo Gal Pictures)

== Best Individual Performance in a Comedy Program or Series ==
- Debra DiGiovanni – Halifax Comedy Festival 2008, Episode 3 (CBC)
- Benjamin Arthur – Less Than Kind – Pakikisama (Breakthrough Entertainment)/Buffalo Gal Pictures)
- Jon Dore – The Jon Dore Television Show – Jon Does Drugs (Insight Productions)
- Terry McGurrin – Comedy Now! Starring Terry McGurrin (Hi Guys Ten Productions)
- Brooke Palsson – Less Than Kind – French is My Kryptonite (Breakthrough Entertainment)/Buffalo Gal Pictures)

== Best Ensemble Performance in a Comedy Program or Series ==
- Steve Cochrane, Kevin Ellis, Phyllis Ellis, George Komorowski, Adriana Maggs, Jordan McCloskey, Steven Morana, Paul Snepsts, Joel Stewart – Three Chords from the Truth – Tommy's Label Showcase (Henry Less Productions)
- Christopher Bolton, Oliver Becker, Mark Cameron Fraser, Michael Bodnar, Sarain Boylan, Inga Cadranel, Louis Di Bianco, Carlos Patricio Díaz, Gabriel Hogan, Mayko Nguyen, Rafael Petardi, Joe Pingue, Jeff Pustil, Philip Riccio, Maria Vacratsis, Jeremy Wright, Matt Gordon, Simon Reynolds – Rent-a-Goalie – Ham in a Pram (Eggplant Picture & Sound/Fifth Ground Entertainment/Georgian Entertainment)
- Fab Filippo, Jennifer Baxter, Mike Beaver, Robin Brûlé, Jayne Eastwood, Brandon Firla, Ron Gabriel, Peter Keleghan, Arnold Pinnock, Aron Tager – Billable Hours – A Mansion for All Seasons (Shaw Media/Temple Street Productions)
- Shaun Majumder, Gavin Crawford, Mark Critch, Geri Hall, Cathy Jones – This Hour Has 22 Minutes, Episode 1 (Halifax Film Company/CBC)
- Ordena Stephens-Thompson, Trey Anthony, Daniel J Gordon, Eli Goree, Ngozi Paul – Da Kink in My Hair – Black Cake, White Cake (Barna-Alper Productions/Defiant Entertainment/Ngozika Productions/Novelette's Productions/Trey Anthony Productions)

== Best Performance or Host in a Variety Program or Series ==
- Leah Miller – So You Think You Can Dance Canada – Finale (Danse TV Productions)
- Adam Beach, Tina Keeper – 2009 National Aboriginal Achievement Awards (CBC)
- Russell Peters – Juno Awards of 2009 (Canadian Academy of Recording Arts and Sciences/CTV)
- Jason Priestley – The 23rd Gemini Awards (Academy of Canadian Cinema & Television)
- Theo Tams – Canadian Idol – Top 6 Performance Show (Insight Productions/19 Entertainment/FremantleMedia North America/CBC)

== Best Performance in a Performing Arts Program or Series ==
- Kimberley de Jong, Danny Desjardins, Mark Eden-Towle, Chi Long, Carla Maruca, Lucie Mongrain, Won Myeong Won, Carol Prieur, Gerard Reyes, Manuel Roque, Dorotea Saykaly, James Viveiros – Body Remix (Amerimage-Spectra/ZDF)
- Christopher Plummer – Caesar and Cleopatra (Melbar Entertainment Group)

== Best Individual or Ensemble Performance in an Animated Program or Series ==
- Tajja Isen, Colin Fox, Dwayne Hill, Bruce Hunter, Rick Miller, Adrian Truss – Atomic Betty – Elementary My Dear, Minimus, Great Eggspectations (Atomic Cartoons/Breakthrough Entertainment/Tele Images Productions/Marathon Media)
- Paul O’Sullivan, Melissa Altro, Juan Chioran, Michael Cohen, Seán Cullen, Lili Francks, M. Christian Heywood, Krystal Meadows, Lyon Smith – Grossology – Pinkeye’s Revenge Part 2 (Nelvana)
- Dwayne Hill – Grossology – Fangs a Lot (Nelvana)

== Best Performance in a Children’s or Youth Program or Series ==
- Michael Seater – Life with Derek – Happy New School Year (Shaftesbury Films)
- Paula Brancati – Degrassi: The Next Generation – Fight the Power (Bell Media/Epitome Pictures)
- Ali J. Eisner – Kids Canada – Favourite Foods (CBC)
- Stacey Farber – Degrassi: The Next Generation – Paradise City, Part 3 (Bell Media/Epitome Pictures)

== Best Achievement in Casting ==
- Marsha Chesley – The Line – Episode 107 (The Nightingale Company)
- Susan Forrest, Sharon Forrest, Jim Heber – Less Than Kind – The Daters (Breakthrough Entertainment)/Buffalo Gal Pictures)
- Stephanie Gorin – Being Erica – Dr. Tom (Temple Street Productions)
- Stephanie Gorin – The Border – Going Dark (White Pine Pictures)
- Marissa Richmond – Flashpoint – Scorpio (Pink Sky Entertainment/Avamar Entertainment)

== Best News Anchor ==
- Diana Swain – CBC News at Six (CBC)
- Heather Hiscox – CBC News: Newfoundland Crash (CBC)
- Peter Mansbridge – The National/CBC News (CBC)
- Kevin Newman – Global National (Global)
- Janet Stewart – CBC News at Six Manitoba (CBC)

== Best Reportage ==
- Neil Macdonald – The National/CBC News – U.S. Economic Crisis (Canadian Broadcasting Corporation)
- Adrienne Arsenault – The National/CBC News – Beijing Olympics (Canadian Broadcasting Corporation)
- Kevin Newman, Geoff Fontes, Bryan Mullan -*Global National – Gettysburg (Global News.
- Frédéric Zalac – The National/CBC News (Canadian Broadcasting Corporation)

== Best Host or Interviewer in a News Information Program or Series ==
- Gillian Findlay – the fifth estate – Powerless (CBC)
- Carolyn Jarvis – 16:9: The Bigger Picture – Darker Side of Chocolate (Global)-
- Erica Johnson – Marketplace (Canadian Broadcasting Corporation)
- Evan Solomon – CBC News: Sunday (CBC)
- Wendy Mesley – Marketplace (CBC)

== Best Host or Interviewer in a General/Human Interest or Talk Program or Series ==
- George Stroumboulopoulos – The Hour with George Stroumboulopoulos (CBC)
- George Kourounis – Angry Planet – Island Caving (Pinewood Films)
- Austin Stevens – Austin Stevens Adventures – In the Shadow of Armoured Giants (Cineflix/Tigress Productions)
- Les Stroud – Survivorman (Cream Productions/Wilderness Spirit Productions)
- Matt Wells – Where You At Baby? – Huey Lewis

== Best Host in a Lifestyle/Practical Information, or Performing Arts Program or Series ==
- Ambrose Price – The Decorating Adventures of Ambrose Price (Firvalley Productions)
- Sarah Richardson – Sarah's House (HGTV)
- Neil Davies, Jay Purvis – The Fix – Ultra Organized (General Purpose Pictures)
- Scott Wilson – Departures – Mongolia: Tribes and Tribulations
- Kristina Matisic, Anna Wallner – Anna & Kristina's Grocery Bag – Mastering the Art of French Cooking (Worldwide Bag Media)

== Best Host in a Pre-School, Children's or Youth Program or Series ==
- Araya Mengesha – Mystery Hunters – Mysterious Legends: Ark of the Covenant (Apartment 11 Productions)
- Sabrina Jalees – In Real Life – Hollywood Stunt Performers (Apartment 11 Productions)
- T.J. Samuel, Tristan Samuel – Are We There Yet?: World Adventure – New Zealand, Maori (Sinking Ship Entertainment)
- Patty Sullivan – Kids Canada (CBC)
- Mark Sykes – Mark’s Moments – Sydney (TVOntario)

== Best Host or Interviewer in a Sports Program or Sportscast ==
- Brian Williams – 2008 Grey Cup Pre-game on TSN (TSN)
- James Duthie – 2009 World Junior Ice Hockey Championships Gold Medal Game (TSN)
- Kathryn Humphreys – CityNews Sports (Citytv)

== Best Sportscaster/Anchor ==
- James Duthie – NHL on TSN – TradeCentre '09 (TSN)
- Darren Dutchyshen – SportsCentre (TSN)
- Steve Kouleas – Hardcore Hockey Talk – Dec. 12, 2008

== Best Sports Play-by-Play Announcer ==
- Steve Armitage – 2008 Beijing Olympics (CBC)
- Chris Cuthbert – 2008 Grey Cup Pre-game on TSN (TSN)
- Gord Miller – 2009 World Junior Ice Hockey Championships Gold Medal Game (TSN)

== Best Sports Analyst ==
- Byron McDonald – 2008 Beijing Olympics (CBC)
- Mike Milbury – Hockey Night in Canada – 2009 Bridgestone NHL Winter Classic (CBC Sports)
- Glen Suitor – 2008 Grey Cup Pre-game on TSN (TSN)

== Best Sports Reporting ==
- Elliotte Friedman – 2008 Beijing Olympics (CBC)
- Darren Dreger – SportsCentre (TSN)
- Brenda Irving – 2009 Canadian Figure Skating Championships (CBC Sports)

== Best Photography in a Dramatic Program or Series ==
- Ousama Rawi – The Tudors, Episode 201 (Peace Arch Entertainment/Reveille Productions/Working Title Films/Showtime Networks)
- David Greene – XIII: The Series (Prodigy Pictures/Cipango)
- Jim Jeffrey – Murdoch Mysteries – Werewolves (Shaftesbury Films/Rogers Media/UKTV)
- Jon Joffin – Crusoe – Rum & Gunpowder (Power Corp./Muse Entertainment/Moonlighting Films/Universal Television/Incendo Productions)
- Gavin Smith – The Border – Unacceptable Risk (White Pine Pictures)

== Best Photography in a Comedy, Variety, Performing Arts Program or Series ==
- Milan Podsedly – The Young Romantic (Rhombus Media)
- Jim Jeffrey – Rent-a-Goalie – Eva Has a Dot Dot Dot (Eggplant Picture & Sound/Fifth Ground Entertainment/Georgian Entertainment)
- Alex Nadon – Juno Awards of 2009 (Canadian Academy of Recording Arts and Sciences/CTV)
- Alex Nadon – At the Concert Hall – Molly Johnson at the Concert Hall
- Don Spence – Rick Mercer Report, Episode 17 (CBC/Island Edge)

== Best Photography in an Information Program or Series ==
- Andre Dupuis – Departures – Mongolia: Tribes and Tribulations
- Henry Less – ’Twas the Night Before Dinner (Henry Less Productions)
- Stefan Randstrom – At the Table With... (Firvalley Productions)
- Keran Rees – Rites of Passage – Aboriginal Rites
- Hans Vanderzande – the fifth estate – Staying Alive (CBC)

== Best Photography in a Documentary Program or Series ==
- Ian Kerr, John Collins – The Wild Horse Redemption (Point Grey Pictures)
- Steve Cosens – "The Rawside Of... – The Rawside Of...Die Mannequin" (Georgian Entertainment)
- Michael Grippo – "Running Guns – A Journey Into the Small Arms Trade" (Devil’s Bargain Productions/Canwest Broadcasting)
- Michael Jorgensen – Secrets of the Dinosaur Mummy (Myth Merchant Films/Midcanada Entertainment)
- Colm Whelan – Death or Canada (Ballinran Productions/Tile Films)

== Best Visual Effects ==
- Lee Wilson, Caleb Ashmore, Matthew Belbin, Sebastien Bergeron, Ken Lee, Lionel Lim, Mladen Miholjcic, Les Quinn, Lisa Sepp-Wilson, Philippe Thibault – Sanctuary – The Five (My Plastic Badger Productions)
- Steve Hodgson, Doug Campbell, Keegan Douglas, Terry Hutcheson, Charles Lai, Richard Patterson, Adam Stern – Impact (Impact Films)
- Bob Munroe, Terry Bradley, Bret Culp, Maria Gordon, Luke Groves, Bill Halliday, Bo Mosley, Josa Porter, Patrik Witzmann – The Tudors, Episode 205 (Peace Arch Entertainment/Reveille Productions/Working Title Films/Showtime Networks)
- Mark Savela, Jason Gross, Paul Hegg, Brandon Hines, Jamie Yukio Kawano, Alex McClymont, Krista McLean, James Rorick, Luke Vallee – Stargate Atlantis – Enemy at the Gate (Acme Shark Productions/Sony Pictures Television)
- Mark Savela, Brenda Campbell, Natalia Diaz, Carina Dielissen Hunt, Shannon Gurney, Paul Hegg, Vivian Jim, Chandra Juhasz, Kodie MacKenzie, Alex McClymont – Stargate Atlantis – First Contact (Acme Shark Productions/Sony Pictures Television)
- Tom Turnbull, Ian Britton, Jeramie Chen, Robert Crowther, Graham Cunningham, Matthew Hansen, Ariel Joson, Andrew Nguyen, Joel Skeete, John Watson – Everest (Screen Door/Certain Films/Freefall Films/Alchemy Entertainment/CBC)
- Lee Wilson, Caleb Ashmore, Matthew Belbin, Sebastien Bergeron, Ken Lee, Lionel Lim, Mladen Miholjcic, Les Quinn, Lisa Sepp-Wilson, Philippe Thibault – Sanctuary – Sanctuary For All, Part 1 (My Plastic Badger Productions)

== Best Picture Editing in a Dramatic Program or Series ==
- Wendy Hallam Martin – The Tudors, Episode 207 (Peace Arch Entertainment/Reveille Productions/Working Title Films/Showtime Networks)
- Jonathan Baltrusaitis – In a World Created by a Drunken God (Pyramid Productions)
- Teresa Hannigan, C.C.E. – Flashpoint – Scorpio (Pink Sky Entertainment/Avamar Entertainment)
- Gareth C. Scales – Flashpoint – Element of Surprise (Pink Sky Entertainment/Avamar Entertainment)
- Arthur Tarnowski – The Last Templar (Muse Entertainment)

== Best Picture Editing in a Comedy, Variety, Performing Arts Program or Series ==
- Robert Swartz – The Young Romantic – Rhombus Media.
- Craig Bateman, Elizabeth Cabral, John Reynolds, Mike Stewart – Canadian Idol – Auditions 1 (Insight Productions/19 Entertainment/FremantleMedia North America/CBC)
- Alan MacLean, Miles Davren – Rick Mercer Report – Episode 4 (CBC/Island Edge)
- Gary Tutte – The Jon Dore Television Show – Jon Does Drugs (Insight Productions)
- Ken Yan – The Jon Dore Television Show – Jon’s Christmas (Insight Productions)

== Best Picture Editing in an Information Program or Series ==
- Alvin Campaña – Departures – Cambodia
- Eric Abboud, Derek Esposito, Seth Poulin, Jeff Reynolds, Nick Taylor – Project Runway Canada – Re-Fashioning the Houses (Insight Productions)
- Joshua Eady – Departures – Cuba
- Dave Goard – Holmes in New Orleans – Going Home (Mirno Productions)
- Jordan Krug – Departures – Zambia

== Best Picture Editing in a Documentary Program or Series ==
- Nick Hector – Air India 182 (Withrow Road Pictures)
- Michael Brockington – Carts of Darkness (NFB)
- Matthew Hannam – "The Rawside Of... – The Rawside Of...Die Mannequin" (Georgian Entertainment)
- Prem Sooriyakumar – The Man Who Crossed the Sahara (Bravo!)
- Jay Tipping – Battlefield Mysteries – The Siege of Malta (Breakthrough Entertainment)

== Best Production Design or Art Direction in a Non-Fiction Program or Series ==
- Peter Faragher – Juno Awards of 2009 (Canadian Academy of Recording Arts and Sciences/CTV)
- Peter Faragher – Canadian Idol – Top 5 Performance Show (Insight Productions/19 Entertainment/FremantleMedia North America/CBC)
- Callum MacLachlan – How Do You Solve a Problem Like Maria? – Performance 6 (Temple Street Productions)
- Michael Spike Parks – 2008 MuchMusic Video Awards (MuchMusic)

== Best Production Design or Art Direction in a Fiction Program or Series ==
- Tom Conroy, Colman Corish – The Tudors, Episode 204 (Peace Arch Entertainment/Reveille Productions/Working Title Films/Showtime Networks)
- Aidan Leroux – Booky's Crush (Platt Productions, Shaftesbury Films, CBC)
- Louise Middleton – Wild Roses – Boom and Bust (Northwood Entertainment)
- Louise Middleton – The Secret of the Nutcracker (Joe Media Group)
- Delarey Wagener, Craig Sandells – Diamonds (Sienna Films, Alchemy Television, Buffalo Gal Pictures)

== Best Achievement in Main Title Design ==
- Kim Jackson, Ron Gervais, Mike McDougall – Flashpoint, Main Title Sequence (Pink Sky Entertainment/Avamar Entertainment)
- Shane Kinnear, Kevin Chandoo, Brent Whitmore – Murdoch Mysteries, Main Title Sequence (Shaftesbury Films/Rogers Media/UKTV)
- Kevin Micallef, Brant Forrest, Don Gauthier, Glen Wyand – Grossology, Main Title Sequence (Nelvana)
- Alain Provost, Aileen McBride, Michel Mercier, Theresa Warburton – 2008 Beijing Olympics (CBC)
- Boyne Stergulc – 2009 National Aboriginal Achievement Awards (CBC)

== Best Costume Design ==
- Debra Hanson – Othello, The Tragedy of the Moor (Governor Films)
- Joan Bergin – The Tudors, Episode 202 (Peace Arch Entertainment/Reveille Productions/Working Title Films/Showtime Networks)
- Mario Davignon – The Last Templar (Muse Entertainment)
- Valerie Halverson – Stargate Atlantis – The Queen (Acme Shark Productions/Sony Pictures Television)
- Martha Mann – Anne of Green Gables: A New Beginning (Sullivan Entertainment)

== Best Achievement in Make-Up ==
- Todd Masters, Leah Ehman, Holland Miller, Brad Proctor, Kyla Rose Tremblay – Stargate Atlantis – Vegas (Acme Shark Productions/Sony Pictures Television)
- Catherine Ann Davies Irvine, Russell Cates – The Border – Unacceptable Risk (White Pine Pictures)
- Debi Drennan, Regan Noble – Murdoch Mysteries – The Green Muse (Shaftesbury Films/Rogers Media/UKTV)
- Lynda McCormack, Madeleine Russell – Anne of Green Gables: A New Beginning (Sullivan Entertainment)
- Leslie Serbert, Jenny Fifield-Arbour – Being Erica – Mi Casa, Su Casa Loma (Temple Street Productions)

== Best Sound in a Dramatic Program ==
- Paul Williamson, Tom Bjelic, Steve Foster, Allan Fung, John Laing, Steve Moore, Tim O'Connell, Michael Playfair – Everest (Screen Door/Certain Films/Freefall Films/Alchemy Entertainment/CBC)
- Ken Biehl, Scott Aitken, Stephen Cheung, Ian Emberton, Don Harrison, Ian Mackie, Greg Stewart – Elijah (Anagram Pictures/Eagle Vision)
- Janice Ierulli, Kevin Banks, Harry Barnes, Brock Capell, Martin Lee, Colin Scott McFarlane, Ian Rankin, Mark Shnuriwsky – Diamonds (Sienna Films, Alchemy Television, Buffalo Gal Pictures)

== Best Sound in a Dramatic Series ==
- Jane Tattersall, Daniel Birch, Yuri Gorbachow, Martin Lee, Kirk Lynds, David McCallum, Dale Sheldrake, Goro Koyama – The Tudors, Episode 210 (Peace Arch Entertainment/Reveille Productions/Working Title Films/Showtime Networks)
- Sid Lieberman, Richard Calistan, Steve Foster, Robert Hegedus, Kevin Howard, Ron Osiowy, Paul Shubat – Heartland – Sweetheart of the Rodeo (Seven24 Films/Dynamo Films)
- David McCallum, Mike Baskerville, Sue Conley, Steve Hammond, Janice Ierulli, Mark Shnuriwsky, Paul Williamson, Zenon Waschuk – Flashpoint – Who’s George? (Pink Sky Entertainment/Avamar Entertainment)
- Russell Walker, Eric Apps, Stefan Fraticelli, Herwig Gayer, Alastair Gray, Rich Harkness, Ian Rodness, Tim O’Connell – The Border – Going Dark (White Pine Pictures)

== Best Sound in a Comedy, Variety, or Performing Arts Program or Series ==
- John Laing, Christian Cooke, Allan Fung, Tim O’Connell – Billable Hours – Pigeon Lawyer (Shaw Media/Temple Street Productions)
- Ryan Araki, Simon Berry, Sue Robertson, Julia Snell – Willa's Wild Life – Spider Girl, Willa on Ice (Nelvana/CBC/Telefilm Canada/Googly Digital Media/Futurikon/Dargaud)
- Simon Bowers, Howard Baggley, Peter Campbell, Matt Lamarche, Doug McClement, Michael Molineux, Dean Roney – Juno Awards of 2009 (Canadian Academy of Recording Arts and Sciences/CTV)
- Simon Bowers, Floyd Burrell, Peter Campbell, Orin Isaacs, Al Miller, Peter Stoynich – Canadian Idol – Top 2 Results Show (Insight Productions/19 Entertainment/FremantleMedia North America/CBC)

== Best Sound in an Information/Documentary Program or Series ==
- Bruce Cameron, Jean Asselin, Adrian Tucker – The Musical Brain (Matter Of Fact Media)
- Ewan Deane, Patrick Brereton, Jim Ursulak – Combat School – One Platoon (Paperny Entertainment)
- Jody Ellis, Alan Geldart – India Reborn – Manufacturing Dreams (CBC)
- Allan Fung, Dale Lennon, Steve Moore – Death or Canada (Ballinran Productions/Tile Films)
- Alex Salter – Flipping Out (Topia Communications/Cinephil/NFB)

== Best Original Music Score for a Program or Series ==
- Robert Carli – Murdoch Mysteries – Werewolves (Shaftesbury Films/Rogers Media/UKTV)
- Jody Colero, Lily Frost, Trevor Yuile – Being Erica – Dr. Tom (Temple Street Productions)
- James Gelfand – Crusoe – The Return (Power Corp./Muse Entertainment/Moonlighting Films/Universal Television/Incendo Productions)
- Mark Korven – The Border – Floral Tribute (White Pine Pictures)
- Ari Posner, Amin Bhatia – Flashpoint – Planets Aligned (Pink Sky Entertainment/Avamar Entertainment)

== Best Original Music for a Dramatic Program, Mini-Series or TV Movie ==
- Michael Richard Plowman – Impact (Impact Films)
- Terry Frewer – Elijah (Anagram Pictures/Eagle Vision)
- Jonathan Goldsmith – Burn Up (Seven24 Films/Kudos)
- Adrian Johnston – Diamonds (Sienna Films, Alchemy Television, Buffalo Gal Pictures)
- Ron Sures – Of Murder and Memory (Thump Inc./Oasis International)

== Best Original Music Score for a Documentary Program or Series ==
- Daniel Séguin – The Wild Horse Redemption (Point Grey Pictures)
- Christopher Dedrick – Death or Canada (Ballinran Productions/Tile Films)
- Christopher Dedrick – The Body Machine (MB Media Productions)
- Edmund Eagan – Flicker (Makin' Movies/NFB)
- Eric LeMoyne – Liberty, USA (Handel Productions)

== Best Original Music for a Lifestyle/Practical Information or Reality Program or Series ==
- Mike O'Neill – French Food at Home – French Food Desserts (Ocean Entertainment)
- David Burns – Design U – Bruno’s Daughter’s Bedroom (Mountain Road Productions)
- Serge Côté – A World of Wonders – The Amazon Rainforest (Genuine Pictures)
- Ryan Kondrat, John LaMagna – Project Runway Canada – Return of the Supermodel (Insight Productions)
- Gaz Mellen – The Decorating Adventures of Ambrose Price – Reclaiming (Firvalley Productions)

== Best Original Music Score for an Animated Program or Series ==
- Michael Richard Plowman – Jibber Jabber – Race to the Red Planet, Pride of Frankenstein (Jibber Jabber Toons/Northwest Imaging & FX)
- Serge Côté – RollBots – Contrab Trouble (Amberwood Entertainment)
- Paul Intson – Grossology – Swamp Gas (Nelvana)
- Brian Pickett, James Chapple, Graeme Cornies, David Kelly – World of Quest – The Crusades, The Little Troll Down the Lane (Cookie Jar Group/Teletoon/Kids' WB)
- John Welsman – My Friend Rabbit – For the Birds, Pearl’s Pals (Nelvana/Qubo)

== Special awards ==
- Earle Grey Award – Eric Peterson
- Academy Achievement Award – Allan King
- Canada Award: Catherine Bainbridge, Christina Fon, Linda Ludwick, Adam Symansky, Ernest Webb – Club Native
- Margaret Collier Award: Barbara Samuels
- Gemini Humanitarian Award – Susan Hay
