= Cultural impact of Celine Dion =

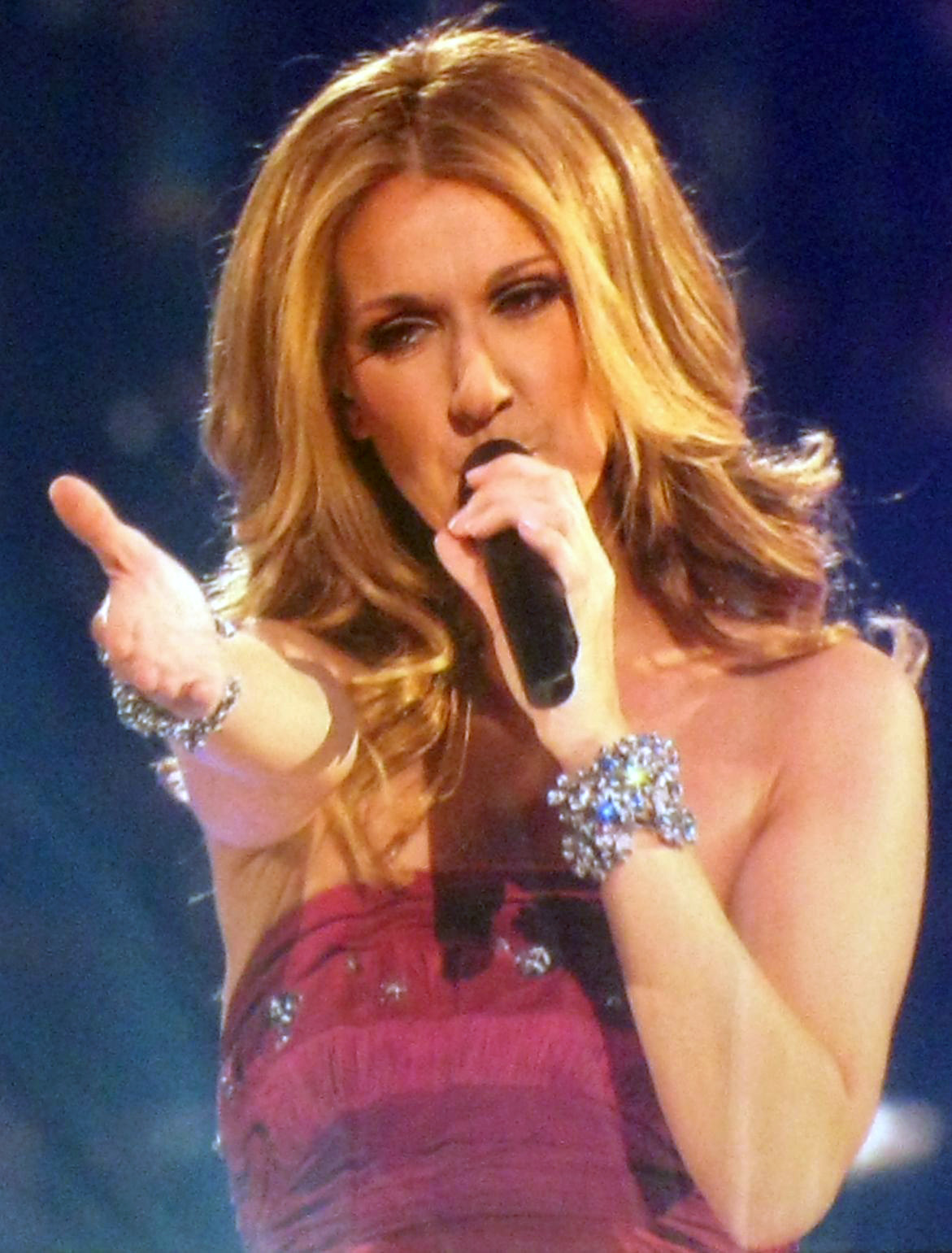
Dion performing at the Taking Chances World Tour in 2008.

Canadian singer Celine Dion has made a significant impact on popular culture through her music, commercial achievements and performances. At age twelve, she pursued a music career as a Francophone artist with the release of her debut single in 1981 and first gained international recognition after winning the 1988 Eurovision Song Contest. Following the release of her English-language debut album in 1990, Dion steadily amassed fame, success and public interest throughout her career spanning four decades.

Widely considered one of the greatest vocalists in music history, Dion is credited for inspiring generations of performers with her vocal talent and has influenced numerous musical artists with her catalog. She has pushed the boundaries of Francophone music around the world and has been credited with redefining Las Vegas residencies, paving the way for artists that came after such as Britney Spears and Adele. VH1 named her one of the greatest pop culture icons while Rolling Stone ranked her the tenth greatest Canadian artist of all time. Dion's commercial success have been compared to Michael Jackson and Madonna by various critics for her impact on the increase of sales and income of record companies, and the music industry in general throughout the 1990s.

In popular culture, Dion has been a subject of drag, parody, and impersonation, while her life and career has been adapted in a number of biographical films and musicals. A polarizing figure, several publications have centered analysis about her career and has received considerable criticisms for her music and business ventures. Regardless, she has been recognized by several organizations for her musical impact. Her album Falling into You was ranked by the National Association of Recording Merchandisers, in conjunction with the Rock and Roll Hall of Fame, at number 97 on its list of the Definitive 200 Albums of All Time. Her song "My Heart Will Go On" was inducted by the Library of Congress into the National Recording Registry for preservation and was also included in "Songs of the Century" list by the Recording Industry Association of America and the National Endowment for the Arts.

== Fame and stardom ==
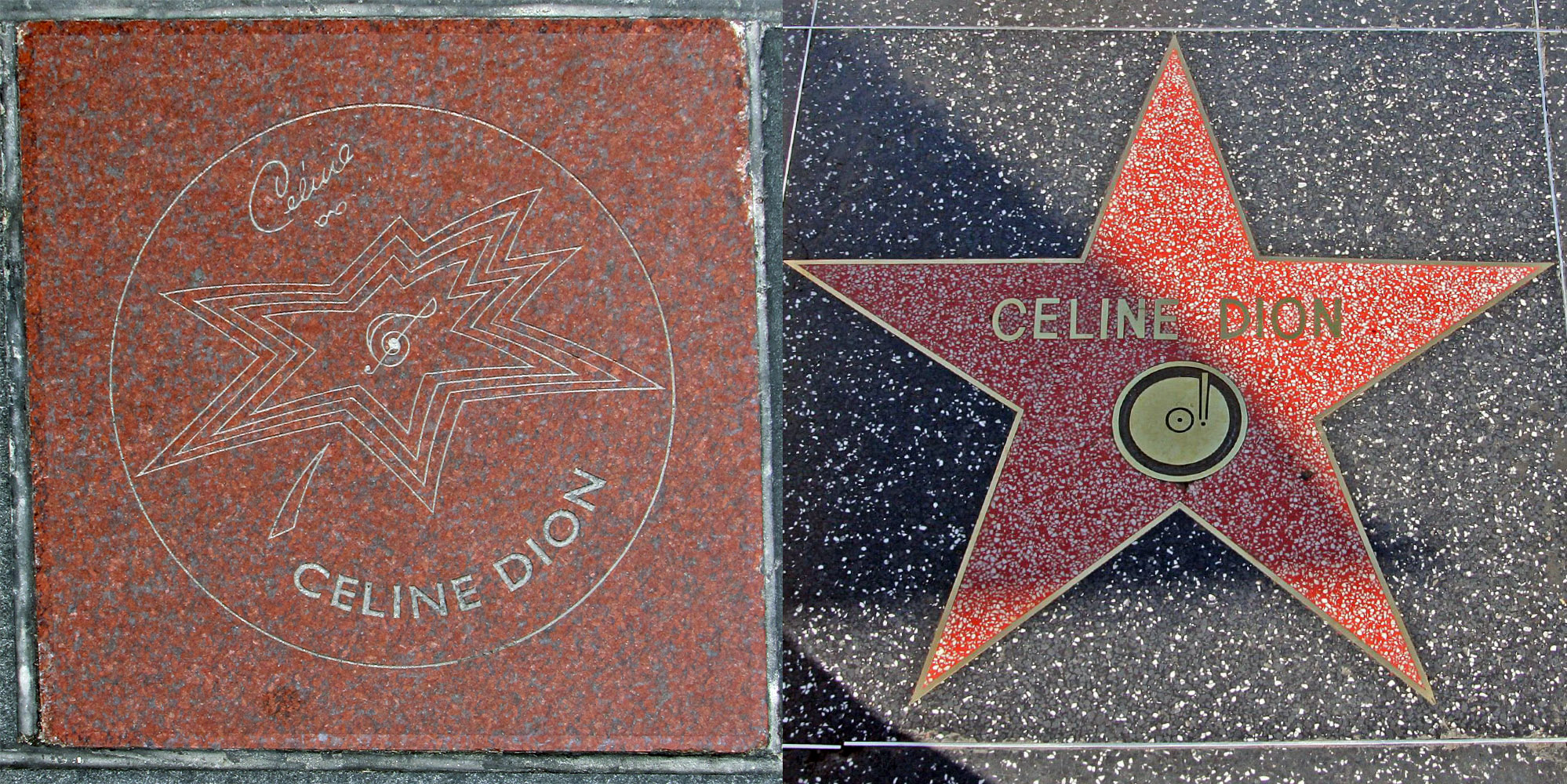
Dion's stars on Canada's Walk of Fame and the Hollywood Walk of Fame

TIME contributor Josh Tyrangiel named Dion the "biggest female singer of all time", noting that "her voice is a natural wonder of immense range and clarity." Chuck Taylor of Billboard, claimed "that no other current artist in the world — perhaps with the exception of Madonna — appeared to have as broad a fanbase, with the ability to seize the charts and retail racks and sell out venue after venue" like Dion. Billboard writer Don Jeffrey noted that her 1996 album Falling into You was responsible for the 16 percent increase of Sony Music's worldwide revenue in the third fiscal quarter of 1996. The Vindicator journalists also stated that Dion's Let's Talk About Love and Titanic Soundtrack boosted the music industry's sales in 1998 by 4 percent. Music journalist Larry LeBlanc opined that her worldwide success "serves as a recipe for multinational marketing", with Michael Roth, former co-head of Sony Canada A&R, adding: "Without Celine, this company would be a different place."

Dion is one of the best-selling music artists of all time. She has released 27 studio albums, supported by a number of successful singles. She has been considered one of the greatest vocalists in pop music, and has been featured on various "greatest singers of all time" lists. Polly Anthony, former president of Epic Records, described her as "the epitome of a global artist", while Us Weekly and Forbes have named Dion as one of music industry's most powerful artists. MTV writer Anne Donahue described Dion as an artist "in a realm of her own". Drew Mackie of People named her "one of Canada's greatest gifts to the world" while The New York Times writer Chris Azzopardi described her as one of the "most revered figures in pop music". Irish Independent have named her Artist of the Decade (2000s) for her consistent success in album sales and concert revenue. Google named her the second most searched music artist of 2016. In 2023, writer Laura Finley named Dion as one of the 300 women who have significantly contributed to American popular culture in her book titled "Women in Popular Culture".

=== Cultural presence ===
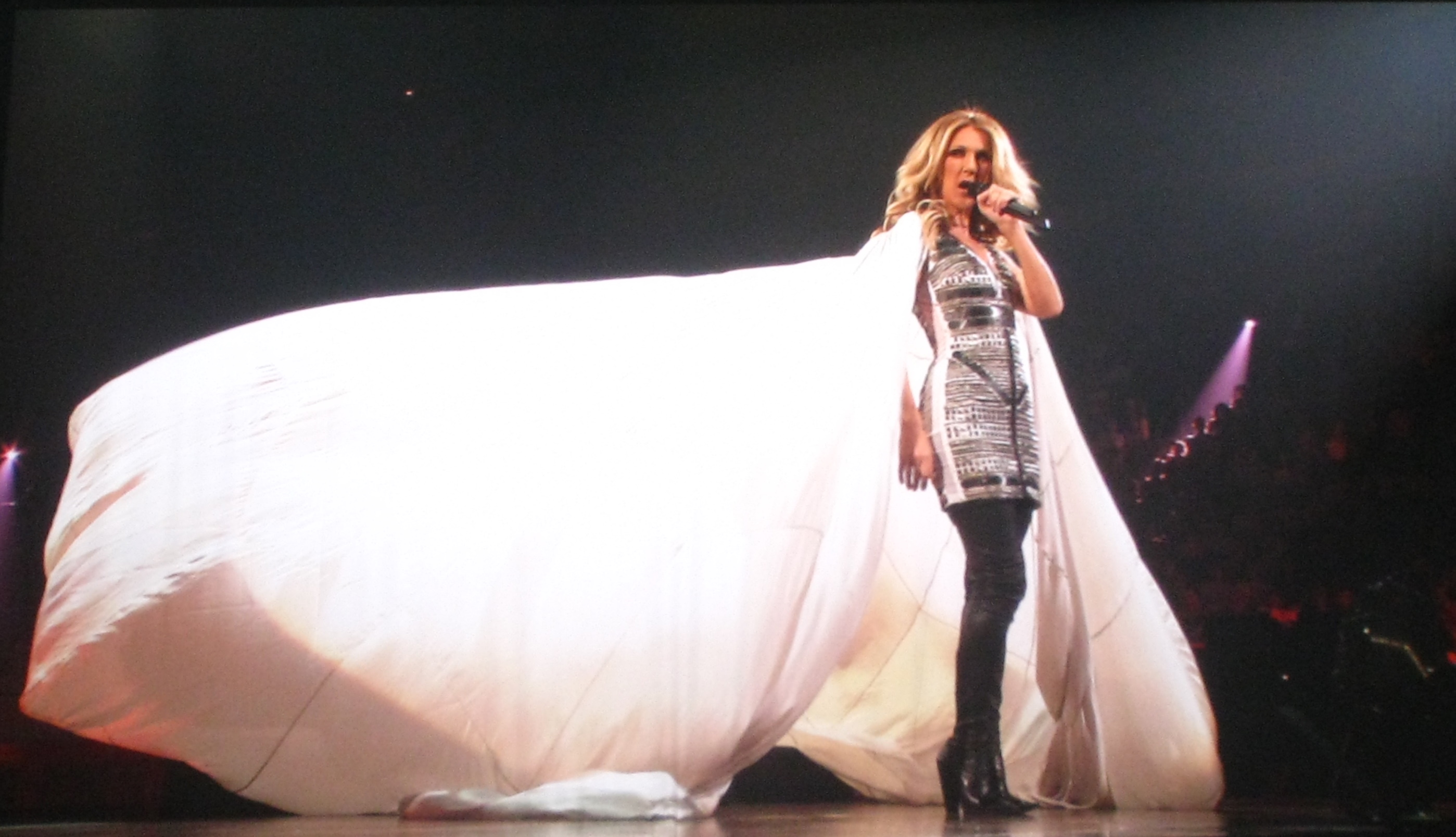
Dion performing at the Taking Chances World Tour

Dion is credited for bringing Francophone music to many non-Francophone countries around the world. She was the first and only artist in UK music history to score a gold certification for a French-language album. Observer–Reporter contributor Jim Willis agreed that her "repertoire represents probably the first time since Piaf that French-language music has a global audience." In a 2003 article, RFI Musique opined that French music "would probably never have got beyond Francophone borders without her" and that "without Celine, French record sales would be dramatically lower!" Theater professor Erin Hurley dubbed Dion as "an ambiguous figure in Quebec culture" and "represents the past and present of Quebec". Beginning 2001–2004, the French media began referring to Dion as one of the grandes voix québécoises (great Quebecois voices) at the centre of contemporary trends in popular music. Other singers grouped in this category included Isabelle Boulay, Lara Fabian, Natasha St-Pier, Garou, Daniel Lavoie, Lynda Lemay, Bruno Pelletier and Roch Voisine. However, the musicologist Catherine Rudent concludes that only Boulay, Fabian and St-Pier truly resemble Dion in répertoire, voice and techniques of interpretation. These singers have in common a style inherited from soul music, in which expressive vocality takes priority over the text, making full use of registers of the chest and head, vocal ornamentation and improvisation. In 2008, Dion was conferred with France's highest award, the Knight of the Legion of Honour by former President of France Nicolas Sarkozy. Sarkozy also praised Dion saying:

"France thanks you because your talent and success have contributed to the influence of the French language outside our borders."

Dion has been regarded as one of the most successful live acts in history. Forbes contributor Larry Olmsted remarked, "Dion pioneered the idea of the musical superstar residency... Dion's success spawned multiple similar residencies at Caesars and other properties by A-List acts like Aerosmith, Elton John, Lady Gaga, Britney Spears, Carlos Santana and many others, changing the longstanding industry touring paradigm". Paul Szydelko of Travel Weekly opined that she "is no less a transcendent figure in Las Vegas entertainment history". According to Gary Bongiovanni, president and editor-in-chief of Pollstar, "Celine redefined what artists can do in Las Vegas, helping to make it arguably the busiest entertainment city in the world." The Guardian writers named Dion's Las Vegas residencies as one of "50 gigs that changed music". Stephen Brown, director of the Centre for Business and Economic Research in Las Vegas said that "she has an outsized impact on the economy" with Jacqui Goddard of The Telegraph calling her a "one-woman economic stimulus package".

"Celine Dion at the Colosseum is one of the most successful live-event endeavors ever undertaken."

— Randy Phillips, Former CEO of AEG Live on Dion in 2003.

Regarding her financial impact on Las Vegas, Stephen Brown, director of the Centre for Business and Economic Research in Las Vegas, commented: "People will come to the city just for her and they will spend money and as a consequence, she has an outsized impact on the economy", then adding "Bigger than Elvis, Sinatra and Liberace put together? Definitely." Estimations indicate that Dion's show will create up to 7,000 indirect jobs and around $114 million worth of new economic activity in each of the three years for which she has been contracted.

Billboard credits Dion as the one who pioneered modern Las Vegas residencies, saying: "Since Dion's debut, hundreds of artists have tried their hand at Vegas residencies ... Once considered the domain of artists long past their peak, today's Las Vegas residency shows are big business, generating millions in sales." Dion is popularly referred as the reigning "Queen of Las Vegas" by various media outlets for her impact and legacy in the city. Kurt Melien, vice-president of entertainment at Caesar's Palace, stated "Celine was a pioneer without question. Twenty years ago, we couldn't have got someone the stature of Britney Spears to appear in Vegas. Stars like her would never have considered it if Celine hadn't paved the way. She changed the face of modern Vegas." The Guardian listed Dion's Vegas residency as one of "50 gigs that changed music", saying: "it was Céline Dion who turned Caesars into the stage for a glorious pop comeback. Her initial five-year run was followed by a further eight years – and prompted copycat turns by Britney Spears, Pink and Katy Perry.

In a 2021 article, Vice contributor Vincent Desmond discussed Dion's influence in Nigerian culture and how it "transcends generations" opining that "while other divas were big in Nigeria – Whitney Houston and Shania Twain in the late 1990s and early 2000s, Beyonce and Rihanna in the 2010s – none have reached Celine's level of popularity." Another Vice writer Dale Eisinger commented on Dion's popularity in Jamaica and the Caribbean, saying: "She has become a fixture in dancehall clubs—many Jamaican artists listen to Dion's songs, cover her music, and remix her love ballads into dancehall anthems."

=== Cultural honors ===
Dion received a star on Canada's Walk of Fame and was inducted into the Canadian Broadcast Hall of Fame in 1999. She received a star on the Hollywood Walk of Fame in January 2004, one which she dedicated to her father, who had died the month prior. In May 2003, she placed at No. 10 on VH1's list of "50 Greatest Women of the Video Era". Dion's album Falling into You is included on the Rock and Roll Hall of Fame's Definitive 200 list. "My Heart Will Go On" was included in the list of Songs of the Century, by the Recording Industry Association of America and the National Endowment for the Arts. In 2021, Dion was ranked by Forbes as the third richest woman in entertainment with an estimated net worth of US$460 million. In August 2008, she received an honorary doctorate in music from the Université Laval in Quebec City.

Dion was named "Woman of the Year" by Billboard in 1998. West University of Timișoara conducted a research study that analyzes Céline Dion's contributions to global music culture in both spatial and temporal terms, In October 2010, Dion was named a Goodwill Ambassador, a program created by the UN in 1999, sharing this accolade with Oscar-winner Susan Sarandon. In November 2013, Dion was inducted at the American Gaming Association Hall Of Fame for her outstanding contributions to the growth and stature of the gaming industry. She also received several state decorations. In 2004, she was awarded the Society of Singers Lifetime Achievement Award. On 26 July 2013, she was awarded the highest rank of the Order of Canada, the Companion of the Order of Canada, by the Governor General of Canada and the investiture ceremony was held at Citadelle of Quebec, in which they said: "An incomparable artist, she is equally known for her compassion, generosity and commitment to a number of social and humanitarian causes. She is notably the national celebrity patron for Cystic Fibrosis Canada and honorary patron of the CHU Sainte-Justine. In addition, through her foundation, she also helps children in need and their families here in Canada and abroad."

== Commercial success ==
Taken as a whole, according to SoundScan, Dion has sold more than twenty million albums in America in just one year's time. And that figure is a precise one reflecting the actual number of albums purchased, not the number of albums shipped out to stores... the idea that a single artist could be responsible for selling more than twenty million albums in one year was once unthinkable.

— Music critic Eric Boehlert, Rolling Stone

Billboard considers Dion as "an industry unto herself". Xtra Magazine writers described her as a "record breaker", stating that she has "joined the rare league of artists who have managed to achieve and maintain success in the music industry across four decades. That places her up there with Barbra Streisand, Cher, Stevie Wonder, Elton John and Tina Turner." Billboard contributor Chuck Taylor said Dion "also conquered territories that are traditionally untapped by English-speaking vocalists", citing the success of her 1995 single To Love You More, which became the first number-one song in Japan by a western artist in 12 years and Sola Otra Vez, which reached top five in Latin America. Also writing for Billboard, Melinda Newman argued that the success of Falling into You defied the convention of industry experts that "the advent of SoundScan would mean that albums would debut at their peak position", after the album finally reached number-one on Billboard 200 after being on the chart for six months.

Dion's commercial success have been a strong factor with the increase of sales and income of major music companies. Billboard reported that the "strong sales" of Dion, Savage Garden, and Ricky Martin in Asia led Sony Music to claim the "front-runner position for the first two quarters of 1998." John Lannert stated in a Billboard feature that Dion is one of Sony Music's best-selling artists in Latin America, adding that her commercial success helped increase the company's sales value in the region. Journalist Larry LeBlanc wrote in a Billboard article regarding the "international and domestic sales failures" of Sony Music Canada, largely due to Dion's indefinite hiatus, among other factors, with a former Sony employee claiming: "Due to Celine's success, our company had been living high on the hog for years... Suddenly, with Celine's retirement... the high living was very clearly over." The Columbus Dispatch writer Erica Thompson opined that "among the artists from the great diva era of the '90s still performing, she is, arguably, unrivaled."

=== Domestic ===
Dion has particularly "achieved superstardom and incredible chart dominance in the 1990s", as per Forbes. Larry LeBlanc of Billboard remarked: "not even international superstars match the staggering success in Canada of Dion. In the past seven years, her catalog has sold a dizzying 9 million albums". She is the artist with the most number-one albums (16) and most number of diamond-certified albums in Canada (6). In 2017, Billboard named Dion the biggest Canadian artist of the Nielsen Music Canada era, while in 2000, the Canadian Record Industry Association named her the best-selling Canadian recording artist of the century.

Dion has also achieved commercial success on the US Billboard charts since the release of her first English-language studio album in 1990. As per Billboard in 2002, Dion is the best-selling contemporary female artist in history. She is the eighth most successful female solo artist in Billboard charts history, the seventh most successful woman on Billboard 200 history and the thirty-first all-time top performing female artist on the Hot 100. With 53.2 million albums sold, she is the second best-selling female album artist since Nielsen began tracking sales in 1991. As of 2016, she remains the first and only woman to have tallied three 8 million sellers since 1991, with Falling into You, Let's Talk About Love, and All the Way... A Decade of Song. Surpassing Whitney Houston to set a new record, she has set the record for the longest gap between number-one albums on the Billboard 200 among women, with Courage. Dion has scored 11 number-one singles on the Adult Contemporary chart and has spent an all-time record of 87 cumulative weeks atop the chart.

=== International ===
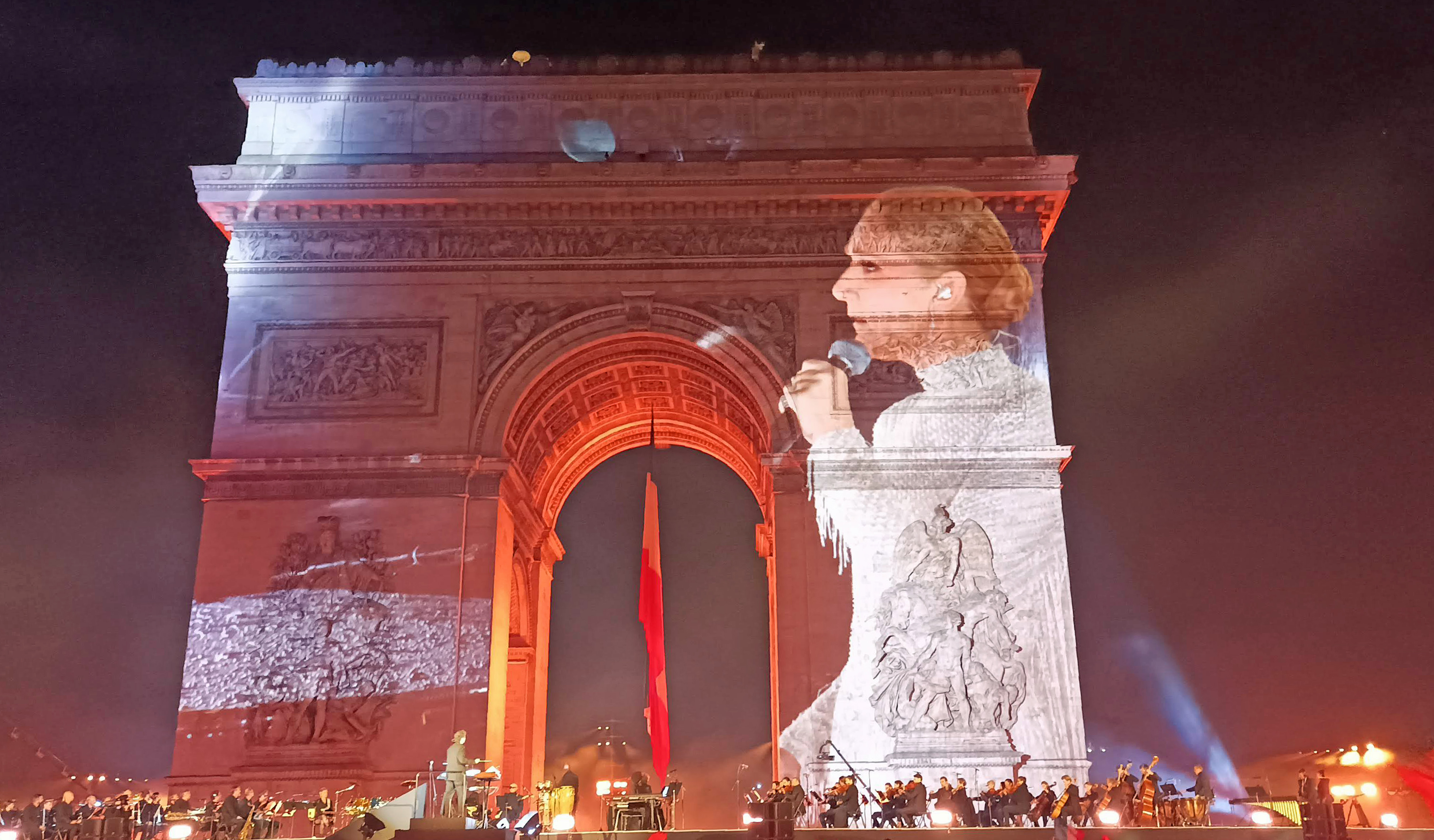
Dion's 2024 Summer Olympics performance projected at the Arc de Triomphe.

The Guinness World Records named Dion the top selling album act in Europe, having been awarded with 33 platinum awards. Richard Ogden, former British record executive, stated: "People thought no one would ever sell 10 million albums in Europe again after Michael Jackson. And who was next to do so? Celine Dion." She has spent the most weeks at number-one on the French singles chart (40) while D'eux, one of her six diamond-certified albums in France, is the all-time best-selling album in the country and has spent a record of 44 weeks atop the French albums chart. Billboard contributor Emmanuel LeGrand noted Dion's increasing profile in France, calling it an "unprecedented domination", further adding that the "magnitude of Dion's success has overshadowed the rest of the crop."

Dion is one of the best-selling Foreign artists in Asia and is the best-selling female artist in South Africa. Vice discussed how Dion's music made impact in Nigerian culture, saying: "By the 2000s, Celine Dion was basically the queen of Nigerian airwaves. It was impossible to watch TV or listen to the radio without hearing her music – either on adverts, or in Nollywood films featuring heartthrobs like Genevieve Nnaji and Ramsey Nouah." In a 2021 article, Vice contributor Vincent Desmond discussed Dion's influence in Nigerian culture and how it "transcends generations" opining that "while other divas were big in Nigeria – Whitney Houston and Shania Twain in the late 1990s and early 2000s, Beyonce and Rihanna in the 2010s – none have reached Celine's level of popularity." Another Vice writer Dale Eisinger commented on Dion's popularity in Jamaica and the Caribbean, saying: "She has become a fixture in dancehall clubs—many Jamaican artists listen to Dion's songs, cover her music, and remix her love ballads into dancehall anthems."

Billboard also discussed how Dion's appearance at Jamaica Jazz & Blues changed the festival's future. According to Walter Elmore, CEO of Art of Music Productions said Dion is by far the most expensive artist he has ever booked, further saying: "I have already received calls from the management of several major US artists who want to perform here next year because they heard Celine's comments about our show's production quality," Elmore said. "Her performance confirms that we can bring the biggest artists on the planet to our little island." In 2012, Dion visited Jamaica for the first time which broke attendance records and caused traffic congestion around the concert venue. Vice discussed how Dion's music has been constant in dancehall clubs for decades, as many Jamaican dancehall artists cover her songs and remixing her ballads into anthems of dance hall. Further adding: "Several current dancehall musicians continue to use utilize Dion's tunes with the addition of upbeat guitars, pan flutes, and backbeat shuffles that transform the music for consumption by dancehall fans." In January 2026, Janet Newenham, one of the first Western tourists to visit North Korea following a five-year closure, wrote through Metro that Dion is one of the few Western cultural exports played for tourists.

Dion has reportedly sold over 60 million albums globally from 1997 to 1998 and was estimated to have sold a record once every 1.2 seconds in that span. Dion is also recognized as the world's top-selling artist of the 90s decade. In 2017, Dion broke records across the UK as the highest grossing artist at each UK venue where she performed including dates at London's O_{2} Arena, Leeds' First Direct Arena, Birmingham's Barclaycard Arena and Glasgow's SSE Hydro. John Meglen, president and co-CEO, Concerts West commended her by saying: "She really is the voice of our lifetime." In 2018, there were over 300,000 Taiwanese fans that clambered for the 20,000 tickets available for Céline's first concert in Taiwan which caused the system to lag for 30 minutes. The demand caused them to add two additional shows eventually.

== Press and media ==
=== Media reception ===
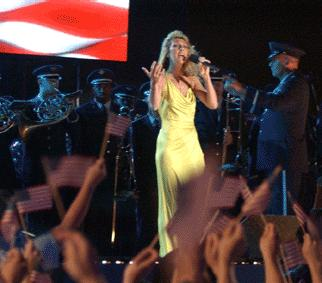
Dion performing "God Bless America" aboard the aircraft carrier USS Harry S. Truman in 2002

Dion has been described as a polarizing figure in popular culture, receiving both favorable and unfavorable press. Several critics have often dismiss her music for its "over-the-top vocal theatrics and the lush sentimentality of her adult contemporary pop sound". In Carl Wilson's Let's Talk About Love: A Journey to the End of Taste, published in 2007, Wilson examined Dion's music appeal, the cultural context of her success and her French-Canadian heritage. The Telegraph writer Helen Brown said his book "changed the way I listened to music" and made her reassess her dismissal on Dion's talent. Describing Wilson as "a white, middle-class, highly educated man", Brown stated that "Dion's music resonated most with people who lacked all of his social advantages", and Dion's "yearning, despairing choruses also hit home with those suffering from domestic violence, prison inmates and women/ gay men living in communities in which they felt alienated." In January 2023, CNN reported that her exclusion from Rolling Stone's list of the 200 greatest singers of all time sparked outrage.

In 2018, Dion launched her gender-neutral clothing line for children, Célinununu, in partnership with the brand Nununu. While Dion hoped this would help "encourage a dialogue of equality and possibility", this venture received criticisms from religious sectors for "promoting satanism". Lisa Gutierrez of The Kansas City Star wrote in a feature about the reaction of a Roman Catholic exorcist, calling the clothing line "demonic". Writing for Journal de Montréal, Sophie Durocher stated that it was overpriced and criticized the design which featured white skulls.

==== Fashion ====
Dion has received praises from fashion critics for her style reinvention. The Guardian called her "The Joyous New Queen of Fashion". Harper's Bazaar also praised Dion for being an ultimate fashion risk-taker and called her a "Fashion Chameleon". Billboard dubbed her as "Streetwear Icon" after recapping the global icon's style evolution through the years. Vogue named her as one of music's most exuberant dressers, beloved as much for her glorious voice as her extravagant sense of style. Tatler discussed in an article how Cardi B might be the next Céline Dion of Paris Fashion Week, proving that Céline is the standard for the occasion. Fashion stylist and image architect Law Roach praised Celine Dion, calling her "The Queen of Camp" and "The Queen of Glitter & Sequins". Dion further cemented her name in the fashion world by wearing the reverse tuxedo at 1999 Academy Awards, which became one of the most talked ensembles of that time. Vogue also listed her iconic 1999 reverse tuxedo as one of the most controversial looks of all time saying it was undeniably the highlight of the year. W also listed the iconic ensemble as one of the most memorable dresses of all time. In February 2020, Sergio Guadarrama, a contestant of Project Runway, copied the idea of reverse tuxedo and claimed it was his original idea and had even claimed that he had no idea about the iconic tuxedo, which left the fans of the show disappointed.

== Creative inspiration ==
=== Influence ===
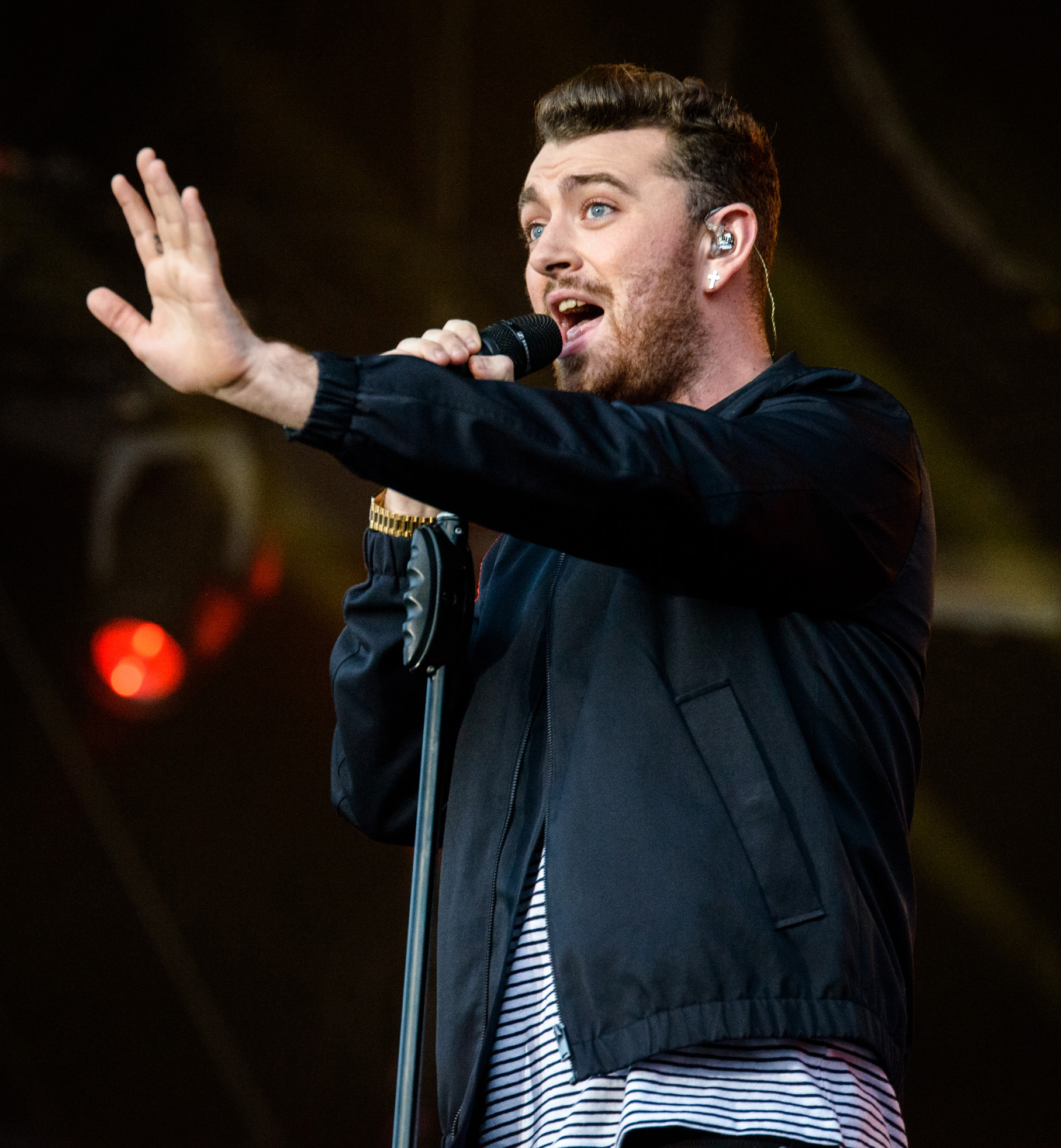
Sam Smith

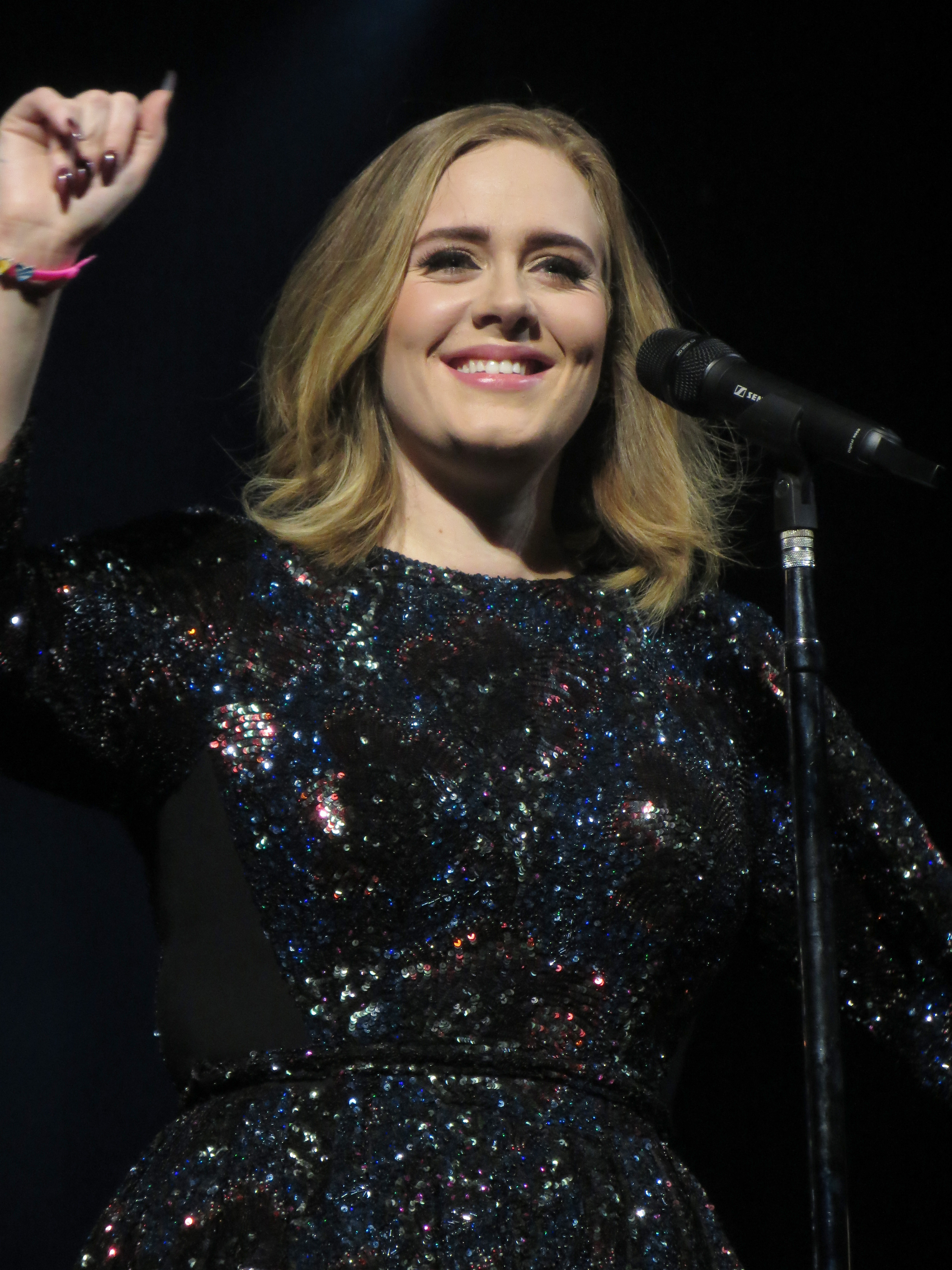
Adele

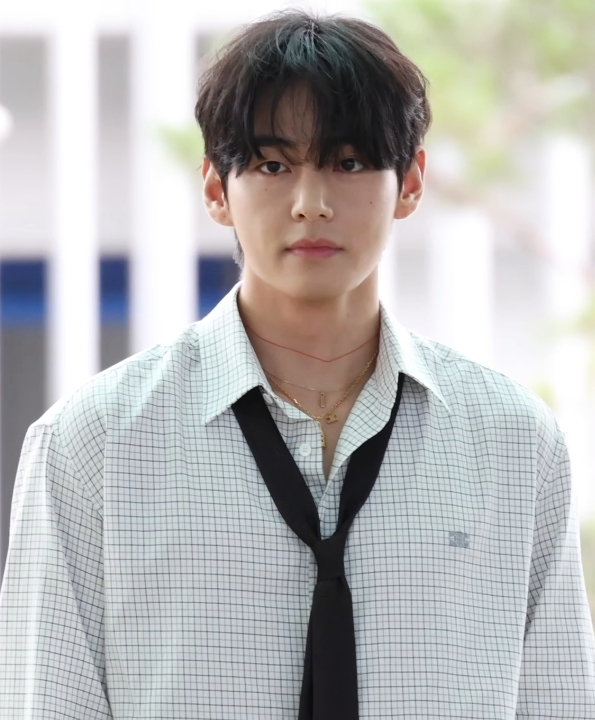
V of BTS

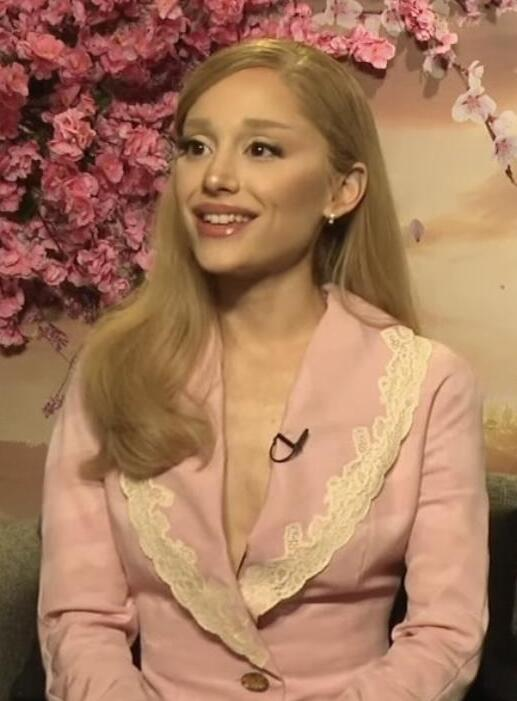
Ariana Grande

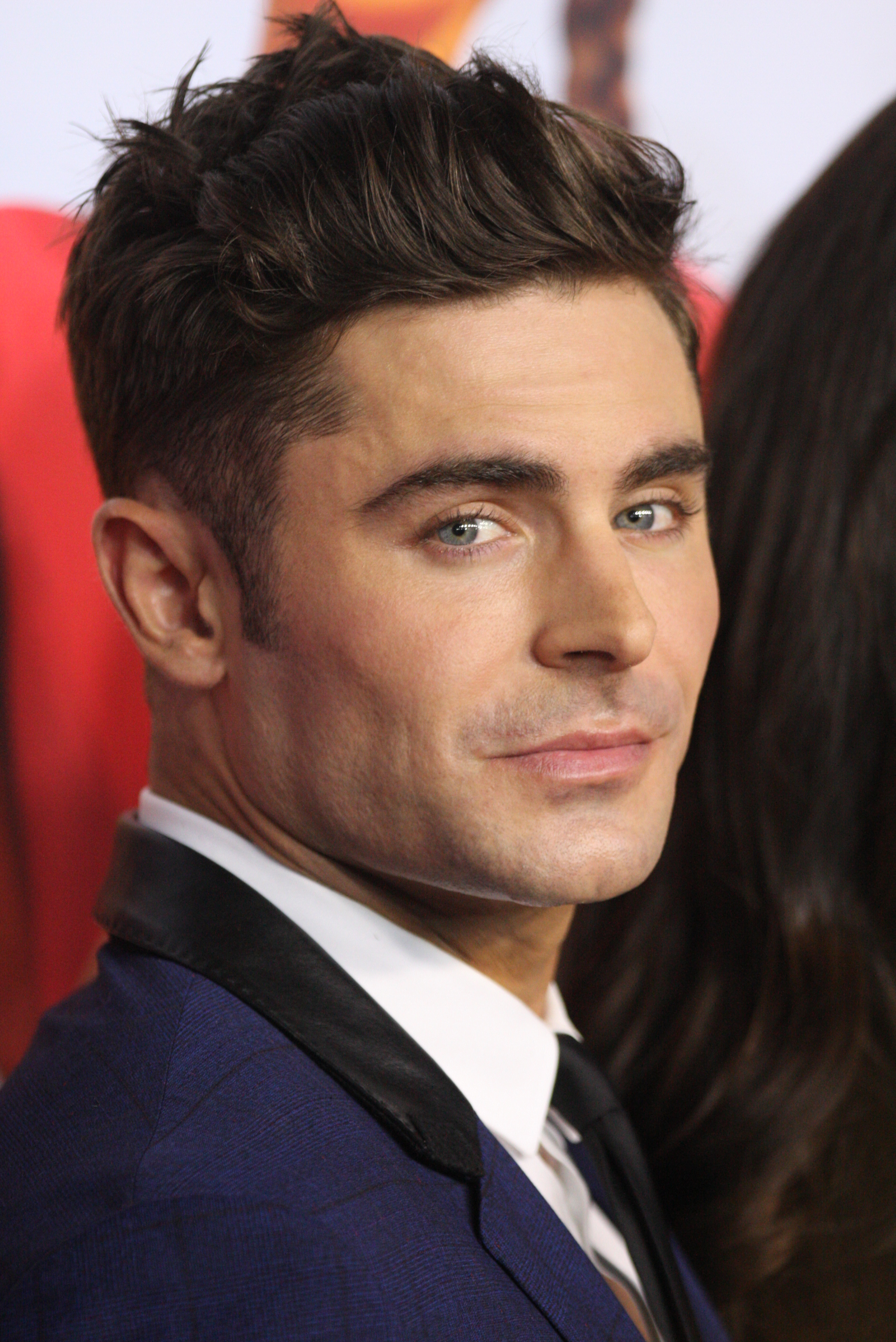
Zac Efron

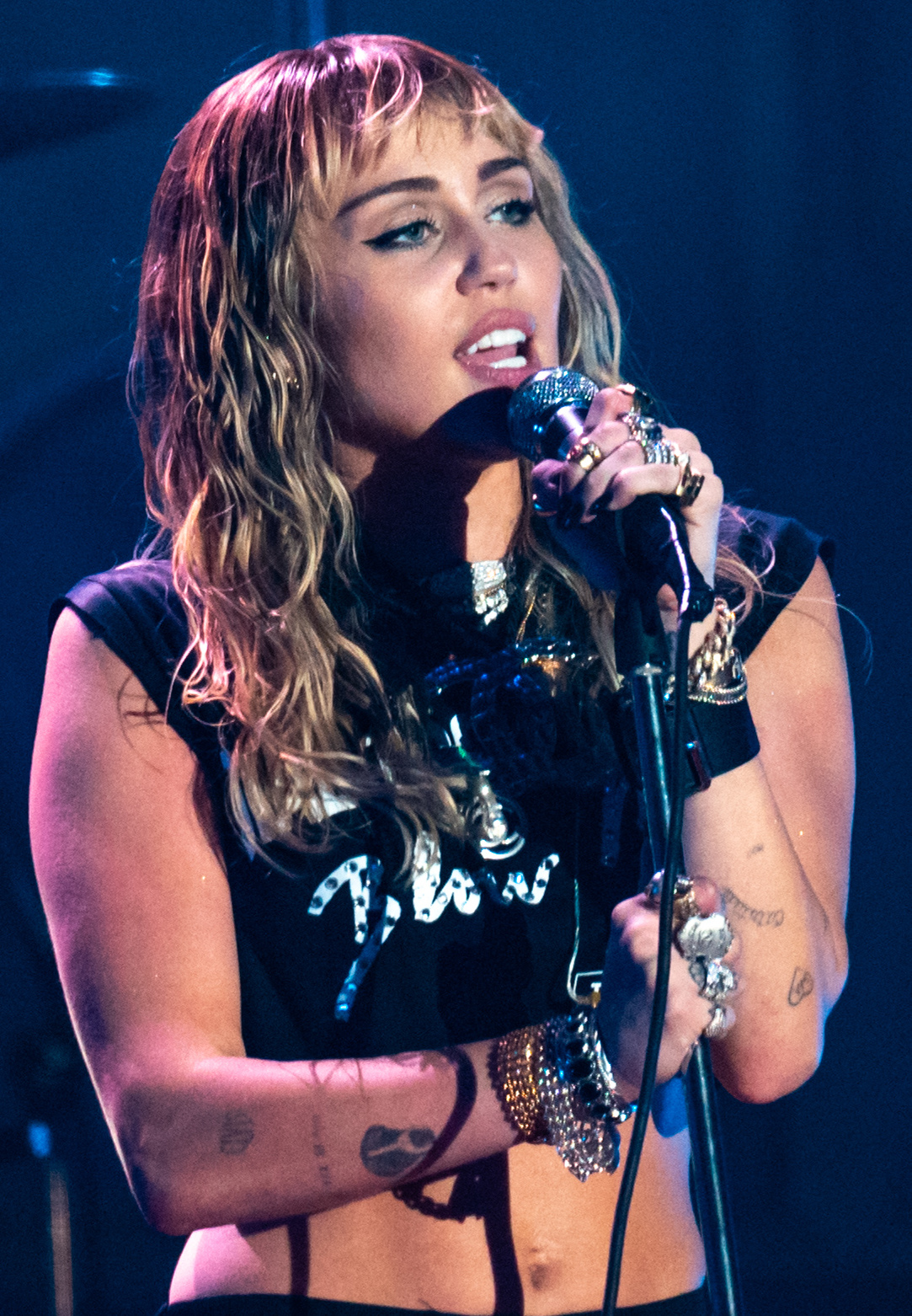
Miley Cyrus

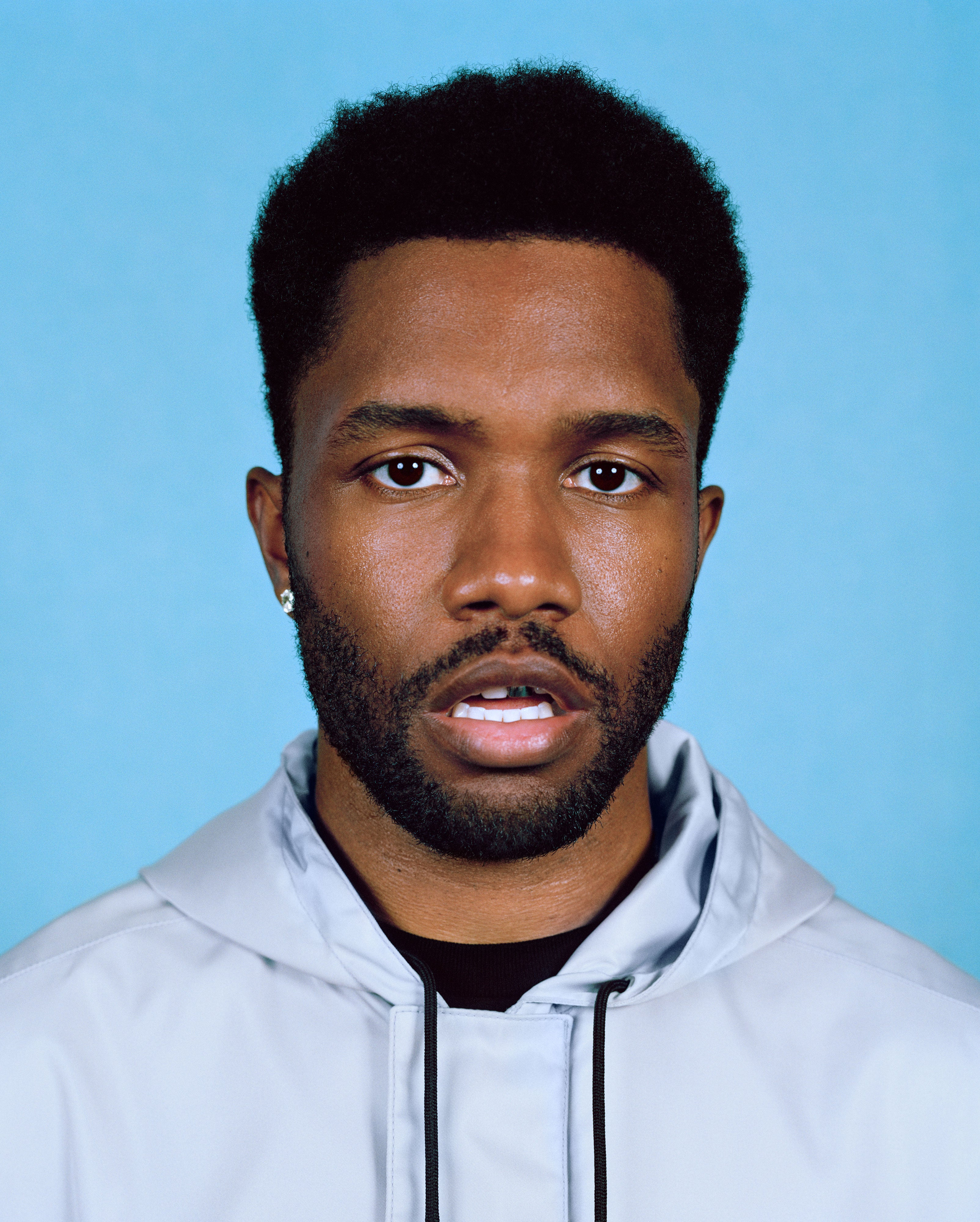
Frank Ocean

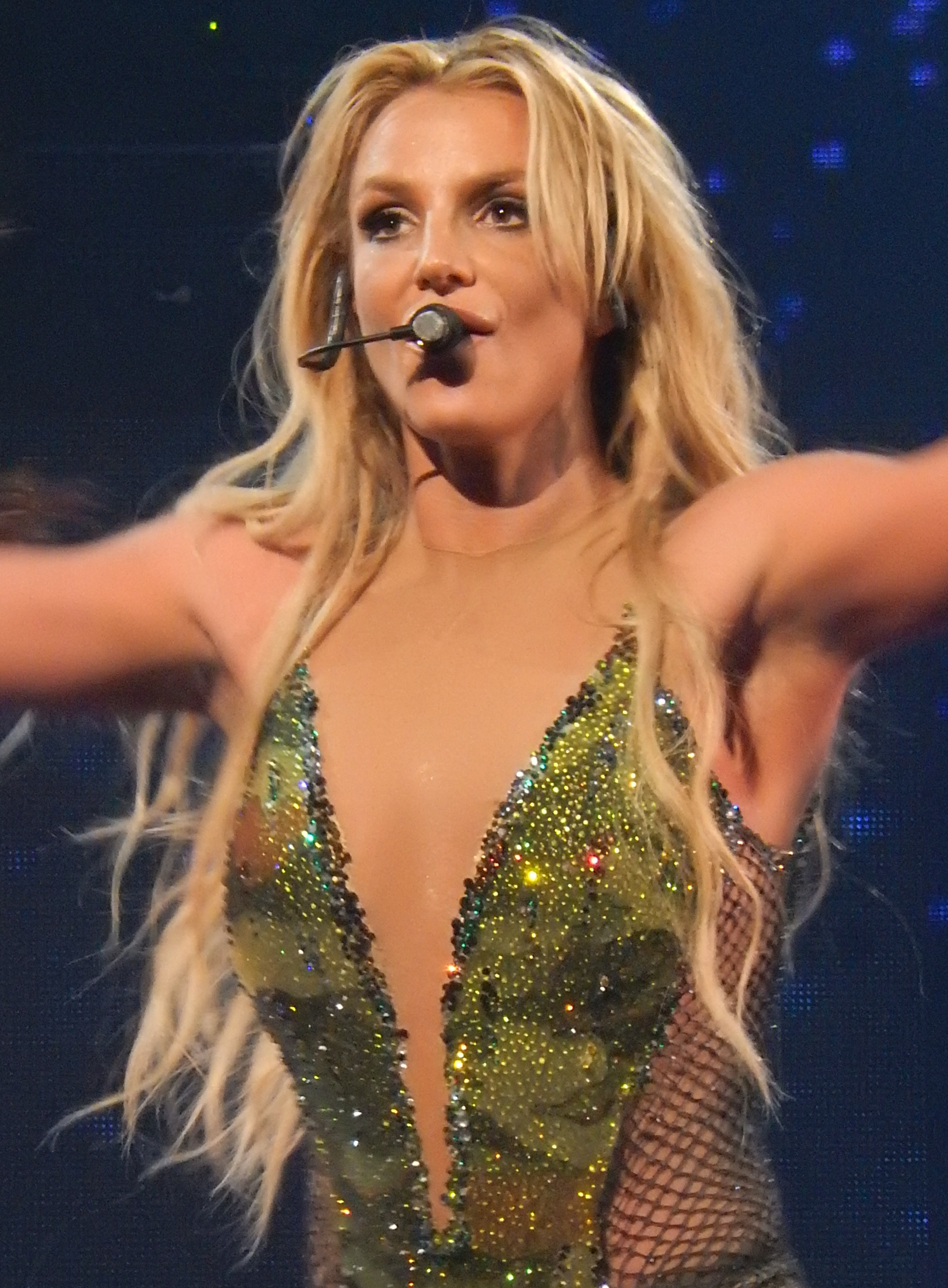
Britney Spears

Several artists have cited Dion as an influence including those pictured above.

Since her career's inception in 1981, Dion has been cited as an influence by various music artists all over the world. Jon O'Brien from the Recording Academy credited Dion for shaping a "generation of performers with her octave-spanning technique." Producer, musician, and former American Idol judge Randy Jackson have named Dion, alongside Whitney Houston and Mariah Carey, as the voices of the modern era. These three artists have been widely credited with reviving the power ballad, and in doing so reshaping the adult contemporary radio format, making it one of the most popular formats of the 1990s and early 2000s. Music critic Carl Wilson also opined that her fame and influence is enhanced through singing competitions such as American Idol, "where Celine's stood solidly in its pantheon of singers for young people to emulate". Various artists who have named Dion as a major influence or as one of their favourite singers include:

- Adele
- Ariana Grande
- Ava Max
- Britney Spears
- Charlotte Church
- Delta Goodrem
- Demi Lovato
- Frank Ocean
- Jake Zyrus
- Jennifer Hudson
- Josh Groban
- Katy Perry
- Kelly Clarkson
- Lea Michele
- Leona Lewis
- Loren Allred
- Miley Cyrus
- Perrie Edwards
- Pia Toscano
- Rihanna
- Sam Smith
- Selena Gomez
- Shania Twain
- V of BTS
- Vanessa Hudgens
- Wanessa Camargo
- Zac Efron
- Zara Larsson

== Continued interest and influence ==
=== Tribute projects ===
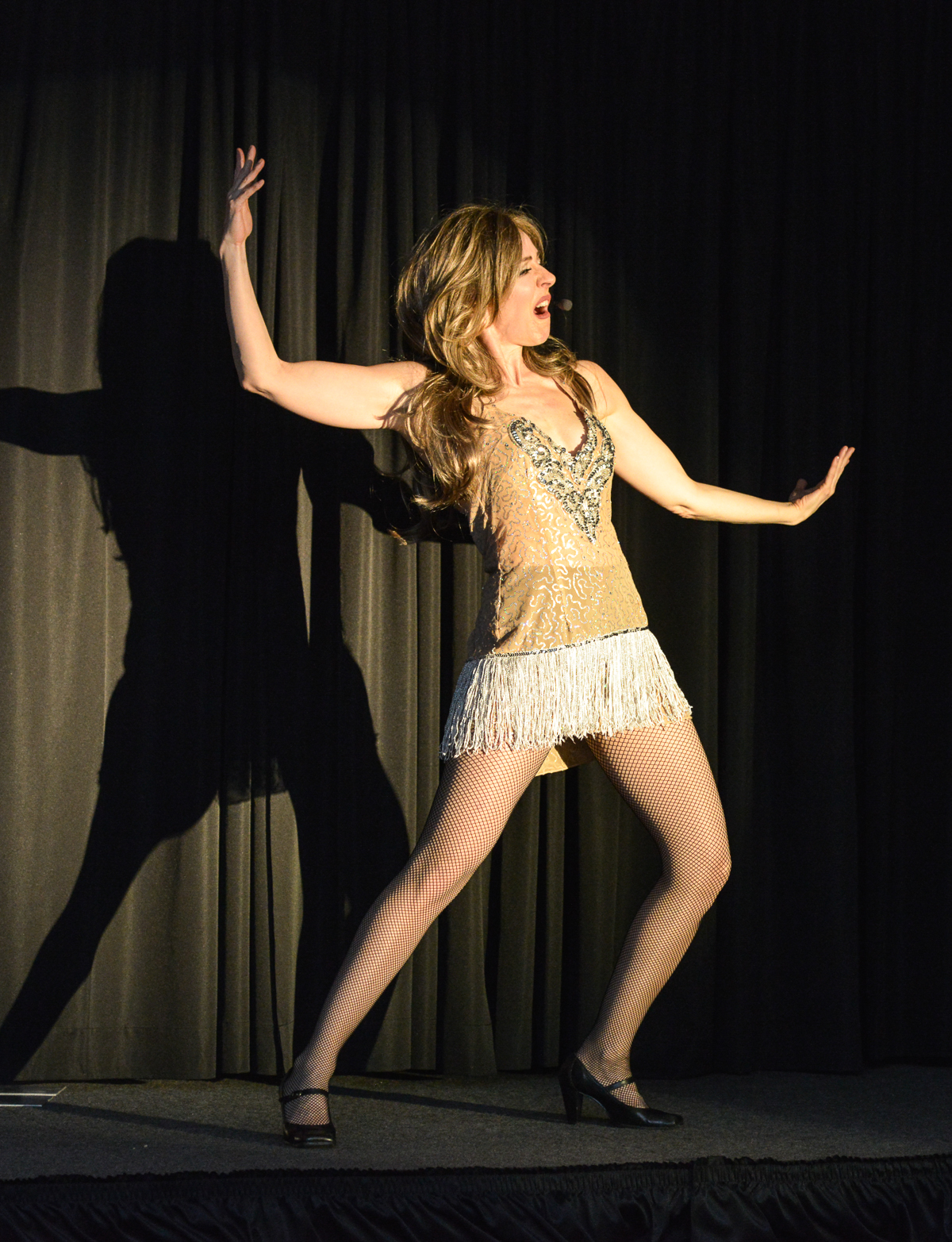
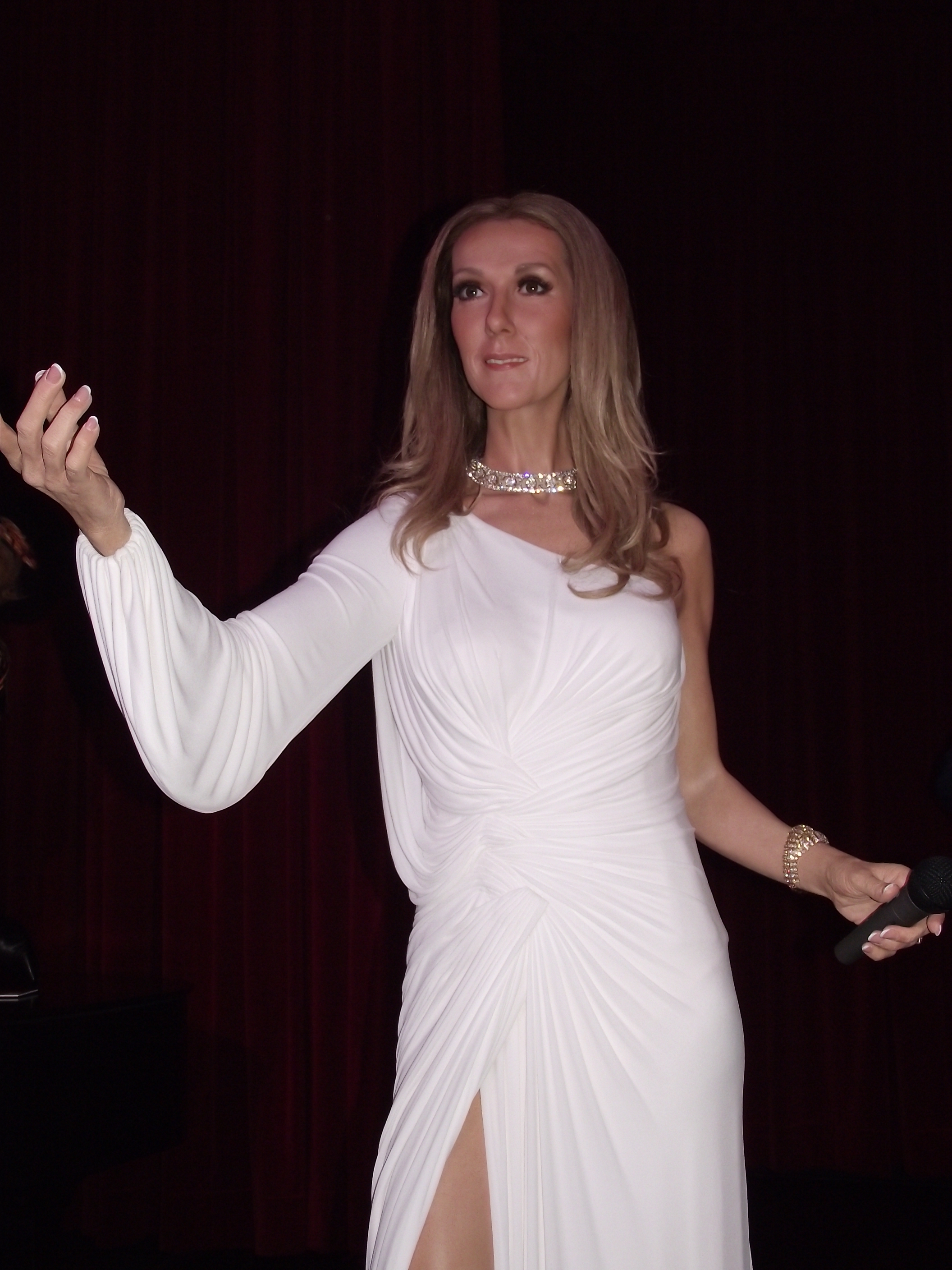
Comedian and impersonator Tracey Bell performing as Dion (left) and a wax figure of Dion at the Musée Grévin Montreal (right).

Dion has been the subject of various tribute projects around the world. A jukebox off-broadway musical titled Titanique premiered in 2017, which is a retelling of the events from the 1997 film Titanic from the perspective of Dion, featuring over 20 musical numbers from her catalog. Marla Mindelle, who played Dion in a number of shows, stated that the musical is "all about celebrating Céline as much as possible", with People writer Dave Quinn calling it a "cult smash off-broadway". Conductor Alexandre Da Costa, alongside other performers, staged a tribute concert titled Céline Symphonique, a "full-on symphonic reinterpretation of the Dion oeuvre". In September 2023, a special TV show titled Pour toi Céline aired in France and Quebec as a homage to Dion's 1995 album D'eux, where a group of Canadian and French musicians come together to "recreate the songs from the album".

Dion has also been the subject of numerous drag queens in their performances. Canada's Drag Race and Drag Race France featured runways and episodes for Dion in categories: "Night of a Thousand Céline Dion's" and "Céline Dion: The Rusical". Other well known drag acts such as Sasha Velour, Pythia, Priyanka, Vanity Vain and Kiara have either lipsynced or performed a number of her songs. Drag artist Crystal Slippers revealed in a documentary series that her stage performances we're heavily influenced by Dion. In 2020, drag artist Tina Burner was in attendance at one of her shows in Brooklyn, dressed similarly to Dion. Several unauthorized biographical films were made about Dion's life and career. In 2008, a television film titled Céline premiered, starring Christine Ghawi as Dion and directed by Jeff Woolnough. A musical comedy biopic titled Aline premiered at the 2021 Cannes Film Festival, directed by Valérie Lemercier, who also played Dion in the film.

=== Reference in other music ===
The Canadian comedy music group the Arrogant Worms released an album, Dirt, in 1999 which contained a song, "Celine Dion", about Dion's stalker-like affection for her. Dion has also been referred to in various hit songs including "Dark Fantasy" by Kanye West, "911/Mr. Lonely" by Tyler, the Creator, "That Girl" by Pharrell Williams, "Work" by A$AP Ferg, and "What's The Use" by Mac Miller, to name a few.

Jazz vocalist Ranee Lee released an album titled "Because You Loved Me," covering some of Dion's biggest songs. Lee praised Dion stating: "I love Céline as a vocal musician, she's fantastic. There's no one who can surpass her ability and range these days"

=== In popular culture ===
Dion was referenced as an antagonist character named "Feline Dion" from the hit animated series Totally Spies!, which was aired in an episode in 2013. A cardboard cutout of Dion was also featured on the 7th episode of the animated series Total Drama Island. In 2022, Dion was also referenced in the animated fantasy film Turning Red. She was cast as a villain in Angloman, a 1995 satirical comic by Mark Shainblum and Gabriel Morrissette.

== See also ==
- List of awards and nominations received by Celine Dion
