= Elijah (2007 film) =

2007 Canadian TV movie

- Genre: Drama
- Written by: Blake Corbet
- Directed by: Paul Unwin
- Starring: Billy Merasty; Tina Louise Bomberry; Currie Graham; Glen Gould; Maury Chaykin
- Theme music composer: Terry Frewer
- Country of origin: Canada
- Original language: English

Production
- Producers: Blake Corbet; Gigi Boyd; Kevin Eastwood; Chris Leeson; Lisa Meeches; Mary Anne Waterhouse
- Cinematography: Michael Marshall
- Editors: Franco Pante; Lenka Svab
- Running time: 90 minutes
- Production companies: Anagram Pictures; Eagle Vision

Original release
- Network: CTV
- Release: September 30, 2007

Elijah is a Canadian comedy-drama television film which was directed by Paul Unwin and broadcast by CTV in 2008. An account of the life and career of Elijah Harper, the provincial MLA in Manitoba whose stand on First Nations rights brought down the Meech Lake Accord in 1990, the film blends animated and scripted segments to present Harper's political journey as a Swift-style satire reminiscent of Gulliver's Travels.

The film stars Billy Merasty as Harper, Tina Louise Bomberry as his wife Elizabeth, Currie Graham as Gary Filmon, Glen Gould as Phil Fontaine, and Maury Chaykin as Howard Pawley, as well as Michael Peterson as Harper in childhood, Gregory Dominic Odjig as Harper in his teenage years, and Lorne Cardinal, Morris Birdyellowhead and Gary Farmer in supporting roles.

== Production ==
The film went into production in summer 2006, with some shooting in the real Legislative Assembly of Manitoba building.

== Distribution ==
The film premiered theatrically at the 2007 Calgary International Film Festival, and was screened at the Vancouver International Film Festival and the ImagineNATIVE Film and Media Arts Festival, prior to being broadcast by CTV on May 25, 2008.

== Critical response ==
John Doyle of The Globe and Mail wrote that "the movie's jaunty tone doesn't always click - it sags into sentimentality in the middle - but it's often gloriously funny and smart. The scenes in which Mulroney's posse tries to shift Harper's position are hilarious. Maury Chaykin is excellent as former Manitoba premier Howard Pawley and Glen Gould does a ferocious turn as native leader Phil Fontaine. Written by Blake Corbet and directed by Paul Unwin, Elijah is one wonderful attempt to make the Meech mess a scorching comedy, but anchored by one truly principled man."

== Awards ==
Award	Date of ceremony	Category	Nominees	Result	Reference
Leo Awards	2008	Best Feature Length Drama	Blake Corbet, Mary Anne Waterhouse, Gigi Boyd, Ki Wight, Kevin Eastwood	Won	
Leo Awards	2008	Best Screenwriting in a Feature Length Drama	Blake Corbet	Won	
Leo Awards	2008	Best Production Design in a Feature Length Drama	Tony Devenyi	Nominated	
Leo Awards	2008	Best Musical Score in a Feature Length Drama	Terry Frewer	Won	
Leo Awards	2008	Best Picture Editing in a Feature Length Drama	Franco Pante, Lenka Svab	Nominated	
Leo Awards	2008	Best Overall Sound in a Feature Length Drama	Greg Stewart, Ian Emberton, Scott Aitken, Ken Biehl	Nominated	
Leo Awards	2008	Best Sound Editing in a Feature Length Drama	Ken Biehl, Ian Emberton, Stephen Cheung, Don Harrison, Ian Mackie	Nominated	
Leo Awards	2008	Best Visual Effects in a Feature Length Drama	James Tichenor, Terry Hutcheson, Mark T. Reid, Michael Ranalletta, Andria Spring, Dave McGhie	Nominated	
Gemini Awards	2009	Best Television Movie	Blake Corbet, Gigi Boyd, Kevin Eastwood, Chris Leeson, Lisa Meeches, Mary Anne Waterhouse	Won	
Gemini Awards	2009	Best Writing in a Dramatic Program or Mini-Series	Blake Corbet	Won	
Gemini Awards	2009	Best Sound in a Dramatic Program	Ken Biehl, Scott Aitken, Stephen Cheung, Ian Emberton, Don Harrison, Ian Mackie, Greg Stewart	Nominated	
Gemini Awards	2009	Best Original Music for a Dramatic Program, Mini-Series or TV Movie	Terry Frewer	Nominated	
