= Tina Louise Bomberry =

Canadian actress

Tina Louise Bomberry (c. 1966 – February 10, 2018) was a First Nations actress, who performed in film, television, and on stage. She was best known for her role as Rosie Deela in the series North of 60 and its three television films.

== Career ==
A member of the Mohawk Nation, Bomberry trained as an actress at Toronto's Native Theatre School in 1986 and Ryerson University in 1988. Her first credited appearance was a minor role in the 1989 television film Where the Spirit Lives. She also appeared in the 1993 adaptation of the novel Medicine River. From 1992 to 1997, she portrayed Rosie Deela in North of 60 and its three follow-up films: In the Blue Ground (1999), Another Country (2003), and Distant Drumming (2005).

In 1995, her work as Rosie was nominated for a Gemini Award for Best Performance by an Actress in a Supporting Role. She also performed with the De-ba-jeh-mu-jig Theatre Group.

== Personal life ==
In June 2015, Bomberry was involved in a single-vehicle accident that injured her and a child traveling with her. Bomberry was admitted in serious condition into the intensive care unit at McMaster University Medical Centre in Hamilton, where she eventually recovered.

Bomberry died on February 10, 2018, aged 52, at her home on the Six Nations reserve in Ohsweken. The cause of death has not been disclosed.

== Filmography ==
=== Film ===
Year	Title	Role	Notes
1989	Where the Spirit Lives	Assistant Supervisor #2	
1997	Song of Hiawatha	Sparrow Song	
1999	In the Blue Ground	Rosie Deela	
2010	Casino Jack	Drinking Companion	
2010	A Windigo Tale	Store Clerk	

=== Television ===
Year	Title	Role	Notes
1992–1997	North of 60	Rosie Deela	79 episodes
1993	Medicine River	Bertha Morely	Television film
1999	Another Country	Rosie Deela	Television film
2004	Blue Murder	Fern Dawson	Episode: "Eyewitness"
2005	Distant Drumming: A North of 60 Mystery	Rosie Deela	Television film
2005	Shania: A Life in Eight Albums	Seamstress	Television film
2007	Elijah	Elizabeth Harper	Television film
