= Pyramid Productions =

Canadian television production company

Pyramid Pictures
- Formerly: Larry Day Productions (1983–1996)
- Type: Private
- Industry: Television
- Genre: Reality television; Docuseries
- Founded: 1983
- Founder: Larry Day
- Headquarters: Calgary, Alberta, Canada
- Key people: Kirstie McLellan Day (CEO)
- Products: The Movie Show; Whatever Happened To?; Inside Hollywood; Biography; In a World Created by a Drunken God
- Total assets: ▲CA$160,43 (2005)
- Parent: Day & Associates Ltd.
- Website: Official website

Pyramid Productions is a Canadian television series production company that has aired over 20 series around the world.

== History ==
Formed in 1983, Pyramid’s first series The Movie Show, aired for 17 years. It was broadcast in over 70 countries.

The company’s best-known series include Whatever Happened To?, Inside Hollywood and numerous episodes of Biography for A&E. Other clients include PBS, CBC, ABC Australia, ZDF, History Channel UK, Global Television, CTV, Movie Central, Bravo!, HBO Asia, Court TV, Animal Planet and The Movie Network.

Pyramid’s first dramatic feature, based on the play, In a World Created by a Drunken God, was nominated for three Gemini Awards. It won Best Feature at the 2009 World Indigenous Film Awards and was chosen to open the 33rd annual American Indian Film Festival in San Francisco.

The Film Festival Project won a Silver Medal at the New York Festivals International TV Broadcasting Awards, while Pyramid’s global-warming documentary Thin Ice: Saattuq was screened at the International Documentary Festival of Amsterdam, Planet in Focus International Environmental Film and Video Festival and Greendance Film Festival. Pyramid was a finalist for the 2007 CTV Canadian Documart competition and winner of the 2008 Pitch It! UKTV Lifestyle competition.

The company was originally formed by President Larry Day under the name Larry Day Productions and changed its name to Pyramid Productions in 1996. Kirstie McLellan Day was the CEO. Pyramid Productions was a recipient of an Ernst & Young Entrepreneur of the Year Award and the Alberta Chambers of Commerce’s Alberta Business Award of Distinction. Since 2015, Pyramid has focused on true crime films, including “Casey Anthony: Her Friends Speak,” “Charles Manson: The Final Words,” “Sex, Lies & Murder,” and “The Shocking Truth.”
