= Departures (TV series) =

Canadian adventure travel television series

- Logo
- Also known as: departures.
- Genre: Travel documentary Adventure travel
- Created by: Scott Wilson; Andre Dupuis
- Starring: Scott Wilson; Justin Lukach; Andre Dupuis
- Country of origin: Canada
- No. of seasons: 3
- No. of episodes: 42

Production
- Producers: Jessie Wallace; Steven N. Bray
- Running time: 46 minutes approx. (1 hour for tv)

Original release
- Network: OLN
- Release: March 17, 2008 – June 19, 2010

Departures (also promoted as departures.) is an adventure travel television series. An original Canadian production created by Andre Dupuis and Scott Wilson and produced by Jessie Wallace and Steven N. Bray. The worldwide premiere was with the Canadian Channel OLN on March 17, 2008, and continued for a total of 42 episodes ending on June 19, 2010.

Series co-creators Scott Wilson (Host) and Andre Dupuis (Director and Videographer) have said that he and Wilson worked on another show, but that it seemed "kind of dry", and that it was not carrying across the feelings that they had, thinking he and Wilson "could probably do a better job".

== Concept ==
The show features high-school friends Scott Wilson and Justin Lukach travelling to various locations around the world, accompanied by cameraman Andre Dupuis.

The show has been described as being about the journey, rather than just the destinations.

== Broadcast ==
The first season of Departures aired on the Outdoor Life Network in Canada and began airing internationally on the National Geographic Adventure Channel worldwide beginning October 2008. The second season began airing on the Outdoor Life Network on January 25, 2009, in 480i, and the third season began airing on the Outdoor Life Network on March 6, 2010. Starting on April 10, 2009, Departures began airing every Friday night on Citytv stations across Canada, with 1080p broadcast on CITY-TV Toronto high-definition channel. The final episode of the series, "Departures: Australia", aired on Saturday, June 19, 2010.

The series airs in Germany with RTL Living, DR HD in Denmark, TVB in Hong Kong, in 50 countries with National Geographic Adventure Channel, and on Air Canada's international flights. Broadcast of Season one expanded to all of Europe, Middle East, Asia and Asia Pacific on Travel Channel International on June 25, 2012. Season two was to begin in January 2013 on Travel Channel International.

The series announced on their Facebook page, that Departures will be featured on the online video streaming website Netflix starting February 2015. As of November 2020, the show was no longer on Netflix but available to watch on YouTube and Amazon Prime.

== Episodes ==
The first two seasons of the show have thirteen episodes each, while the third has sixteen episodes. Lukach has stated that a fourth season will not be made, as Wilson and Dupuis are working on a new show, Descending, which aired February 19, 2012. Wilson believes that "there is little chance of a fourth season."

Below is a chronological list of places visited in each season:

Season 1

- Canada: Ocean to Ocean
- Jordan
- India × 2
- Ascension Island
- Japan × 2
- Cook Islands
- New Zealand × 2
- Thailand
- Cambodia
- Canada: Pushing North

Season 2

- Morocco
- Libya
- Brazil × 2
- Cuba
- Mongolia × 2
- Iceland
- Zambia
- Madagascar
- Chile × 2
- Antarctica

Season 3

- Russia × 2
- Sri Lanka
- Vietnam
- Papua New Guinea × 2
- Ecuador
- Ethiopia × 2
- Rwanda
- Greenland
- North Korea × 2
- Indonesia × 2
- Australia

== Canada Golden Sheaf Awards ==
Year	Category	Nominee	Episode	Result
2008	Best Documentary Series	Jessie Wallace and Steven Bray	India: Quest for Himalayas and "Cambodia"	Won
2008	Best Directing	Director: Andre Dupuis	India: Quest for Himalayas	Won

== Gemini Awards ==
Year	Category	Nominee	Episode	Result
2008	Best Photography in an Information Program or Series	Andre Dupuis	India: Quest for Himalayas	Won
2008	Best Picture Editing in an Information Program or Series	Joshua Eady	India: Quest for Himalayas	Nominated
2009	Best Picture Editing in an Information Program or Series	Joshua Eady	Cuba	Nominated
2009	Best Picture Editing in an Information Program or Series	Jordan Krug	Zambia	Nominated
2009	Best Picture Editing in an Information Program or Series	Alvin Campaña	Cambodia	Won
2009	Best Direction in a Lifestyle/Practical Information Program or Series	Andre Dupuis	Libya	Nominated
2009	Best Photography in an Information Program or Series	Andre Dupuis	Mongolia: Tribes and Tribulations	Won
2009	Best Host in a Lifestyle/Practical Information, or Performing Arts Program or Series	Scott Wilson	Mongolia: Tribes and Tribulations	Nominated
2010	Best Photography in an Information Program or Series	Andre Dupuis	Ethiopia: Saints and Snakes	Nominated
2010	Best Picture Editing in an Information Program or Series	Jordan Krug	Papua New Guinea: Fire and Water	Nominated
2010	Best Picture Editing in an Information Program or Series	Joshua Eady	Russia: The Bull of Winter	Nominated

== See also ==
- Madventures, a backpacker adventure journal.
- Word Travels, a travel series also on OLN
