= In a World Created by a Drunken God =

Play by Drew Hayden Taylor

In a World Created by a Drunken God is a play by Canadian author Drew Hayden Taylor, which was adapted into a film in 2008.

The play was staged for the first time at the Factory Theatre in Toronto, Ontario, as part of the Cross Currents theatre festival in 2003. Published in book form by Talonbooks in 2006, it was nominated for the Governor General's Award for English-language drama at the 2006 Governor General's Awards.

== Plot ==
In the middle of packing up his Toronto apartment in order to move back to the reserve where he was born, Jason Pierce, a half-Native half-white man, is visited by a stranger, Harry Dieter. Dieter claims to be his brother, the legitimate and acknowledged son of the white American man who fathered and then abandoned Jason. Dieter also has a specific motivation for finding Jason: their father is dying from kidney failure and they want to know if Jason is a possible match.

== Adaptation ==
The play was adapted into a film in 2008 with John Hazlett directing from a screenplay penned by Taylor. It premiered on the Aboriginal Peoples Television Network in 2008, and was a Gemini Award nominee for Best TV Movie at the 24th Gemini Awards in 2009.
