= The Last Templar (miniseries) =

- DVD cover
- Genre: Adventure, drama
- Based on: The Last Templar by Raymond Khoury
- Written by: Suzette Couture
- Directed by: Paolo Barzman
- Starring: Mira Sorvino; Victor Garber; Scott Foley; Anthony Lemke
- Theme music composer: Normand Corbeil
- Country of origin: Canada
- Original language: English
- No. of episodes: 2

Production
- Producer: Irene Litinsky
- Cinematography: Thomas Burstyn
- Editor: Arthur Tarnowski
- Running time: 170 minutes
- Production company: Muse Entertainment Enterprises

Original release
- Network: NBC
- Release: January 25 – January 26, 2009

The Last Templar is a three-hour Canadian television miniseries based on the 2005 novel The Last Templar, which aired in the U.S. on January 25 and 26, 2009, starring Mira Sorvino, Scott Foley, Victor Garber, Anthony Lemke, Kenneth Welsh, Danny Blanco Hall and Omar Sharif. The miniseries is produced by Muse Entertainment Enterprises. Emmy Award-winning Robert Halmi Sr. (who produced the Gulliver's Travels miniseries), along with Robert Halmi Jr. (The Poseidon Adventure), and Michael Prupas are the executive producers.

== Plot ==
At the New York Metropolitan Museum, four horsemen dressed as 12th-century knights storm the gala opening of an exhibition of Vatican treasures and steal an arcane medieval decoder. Archaeologist Tess Chaykin (Mira Sorvino) and FBI agent Sean Daley (Scott Foley) engage in a chase across three continents in search of the enemy and the lost secret of the Knights Templar.

== Cast ==
- Mira Sorvino as Tess Chaykin
- Scott Foley as Agent Sean Daley
- Victor Garber as Monsignor De Angelis
- Stéphane Demers as Knights Templar Martin
