= Korbett Matthews =

Canadian filmmaker (born 1972)

Korbett Matthews is a filmmaker, writer, and director from Montreal, Canada.

== History ==
Matthews studied at Concordia University.

Matthews produces international works which elude categorization. He merges new forms of cinematic expression with traditional nonfiction approaches to move viewers into a new audio-visual realm.

Matthews's work has been awarded prizes by such festivals as the Images Festival, Docupolis, the Yorkton Short Film Festival, L’Alterniva Festival of Independent Cinema, the Amnesty International Film Festival and Hot Docs Canadian International Documentary Film Festival. He studied filmmaking at Concordia University’s Mel Hoppenheim School of Cinema and worked as a research associate and assistant director to the acclaimed documentary filmmaker Patricio Henríquez of Macumba International.

In 2003, he and fellow filmmaker Prem Sooriyakumar founded 7th Embassy (7E) , an international filmtank devoted to the production of creative documentary media projects and development initiatives.

== Films ==
His short films include:

- the lyrical Haitian travelogue Lèzenvisib (2000)
- Cambodian genocidal essay Devouring Buddha (2002), which was awarded Best Direction for Short to Mid-Length Documentary - Canadian Spectrum Program at Hot Docs
- The India Space Opera (2015)
- the feature documentary The Man Who Crossed The Sahara (2007)

He is beginning research on Farewell to Grozny, a documentary on the War in Chechnya. He currently works as a lecturer in media production at Breda University of Applied Sciences in the Netherlands.
