= The Rawside Of... =

- Genre: Documentary
- Country of origin: Canada
- Original language: English
- No. of seasons: 1
- No. of episodes: 8

Production
- Executive producer: Chris Szarka
- Producers: Raj Panikkar, Jagori Tanna
- Running time: one hour (approx. 0:42)

Original release
- Network: IFC
- Release: July 9, 2008

The Rawside Of... is a Canadian hour-long music documentary television series. The series is produced by Georgian Entertainment. It premiered on October 28, 2008 at 8 pm EST on Canadian digital cable specialty channel, IFC.

== Premise ==
Each episode tells a story of one artist or band making it work in the music business and explores in depth a central theme surrounding them. The stories go behind the scenes and depict the artists in their own environments, and in places not normally seen, in a unique and private way. The series uses an uncensored witness approach and artful cinematography, giving it a look unlike the standard magazine style music documentaries often made by entities like MTV. The artists do perform as part of the episode, but the performances tend to be very stripped down and bare, and to be a part of the story being told.

The first season consisted of 8 episodes that featured Die Mannequin, Born Ruffians, Brendan Canning of Broken Social Scene, The Cliks, Dodger with Skye Sweetnam, Gracer, Bourbon Tabernacle Choir, and Metric.
