= Larry LeBlanc =

Canadian journalist

Larry LeBlanc is a music journalist who wrote hundreds of articles about the music industry in Canada as the Canadian bureau chief of Billboard as well as a number of other publications, and contributed to the development of the National Music Centre in Calgary. He is currently senior writer of the weekly U.S. entertainment trade CelebrityAccess, where he is responsible for the series "In The Hot Seat". He is the recipient of a 2013 Juno Special Achievement Award.

== Career ==
In the 1970s, LeBlanc was a correspondent for Rolling Stone magazine. In 1973 and 1974, LeBlanc was a writer for the Ian Tyson Show.

From 1970 to 1980, LeBlanc edited Canadian articles for the magazine Record World. During the late 1970s and early 1980s he hosted the Sunday afternoon radio program Backstage Pass on Q107 in Toronto, where he introduced many New Wave and Punk acts to his audience. In 1981, he co-founded the music industry magazine The Record.

LeBlanc was the Canadian bureau chief for Billboard Magazine from 1991 to 2007.

In 2010 LeBlanc co-authored the book "Music From Far And Wide: Celebrating 40 Years Of The Juno Awards" with Karen Bliss, Nick Krewen, and Jason Schneider, released by Key Porter Books.

In 2013 LeBlanc was presented with a 2013 Juno Walt Grealis Special Achievement Award for his contributions to the Canadian music industry.

In 2015 LeBlanc worked as a consultant during the development of the new National Music Centre in Calgary, Alberta. In 2016 he was a writer for the magazine Celebrity Access and also hosted a show on CBC Radio entitled "Larry and the three Wise Men".

Currently LeBlanc is the senior writer of the weekly U.S. entertainment trade CelebrityAccess, where he is responsible for the series "In The Hot Seat". Additionally he was a six-year board member of the Mariposa Folk Festival in Orillia, Ontario, and a Lifetime Member of the Songwriters Hall of Fame.
