= Araz Artinian =

Armenian filmmaker and documentarian

Araz Artinian is a Canadian filmmaker and documentarian of Armenian descent. She was born Montreal, Quebec.

In 1999, she started working with Atom Egoyan as Head Researcher for his feature film Ararat which was premiered at the 2002 Cannes Film Festival.

The Genocide in Me is the latest documentary she wrote, filmed, and directed.

Artinian received the Genocide Recognition Award from Armenian Music Award in 2006.
