= Céline (2008 film) =

- DVD cover
- Written by: Donald Martin
- Directed by: Jeff Woolnough
- Starring: Christine Ghawi; Jodelle Ferland; Peter MacNeill; Louise Pitre; Mac Fyfe; Natalie Radford; Enrico Colantoni
- Country of origin: Canada
- Original language: English

Production
- Cinematography: Mirosław Baszak
- Editor: Mike Lee

Original release
- Release: 10 May 2008

Céline is a 2008 television unauthorized film biopic about the life of Canadian singer Celine Dion. The film chronicles Dion's life from a young girl singing in her father's club, right through her career as a worldwide successful singer to the present day. It was directed by Jeff Woolnough.

Christine Ghawi, who played the lead role, claimed that she auditioned for the role by doing a campy, comedic lip sync performance to Dion's "My Heart Will Go On", as if she were a drag queen performing to the song in a bar.

== Cast ==
- Christine Ghawi as Céline Dion
  - Jodelle Ferland as Young Celine
- Peter MacNeill as Adhemar Dion
- Louise Pitre as Thérèse Tanguay-Dion
- Mac Fyfe as Michel
- Natalie Radford
- Enrico Colantoni as René Angélil

== Awards ==
Christine Ghawi won the Gemini Award for Best Actress in a Television Film or Miniseries at the 24th Gemini Awards in 2009. The film was also nominated for Best TV Movie and Best Writing in a Dramatic Program or Miniseries (Donald Martin).
