= Christine Ghawi =

Canadian actress and singer

Christine Ghawi is a Canadian actress and singer. She is most noted for her portrayal of Céline Dion in the 2008 television film Céline, for which she won the Gemini Award for Best Actress in a Television Film or Miniseries at the 24th Gemini Awards in 2009.

Ghawi claimed that she auditioned for the role by doing a campy, comedic lip sync performance to Dion's "My Heart Will Go On", as if she were a drag queen performing to the song in a bar.
