= AquaMobile =

- Type: Private
- Industry: Education; Sports; Aquatic sports
- Founded: February 15, 2011; 15 years ago, in Toronto, Canada
- Founder: Diana Goodwin
- Headquarters: Toronto, Canada
- Area served: America, Canada, Australia
- Products: Private At-Home Swim Lessons
- Number of employees: 1,500
- Website: aquamobile.com

AquaMobile is a private swim school providing on-demand private swim lessons in clients' homes. Founded in 2011, it has been described as "the Uber of at-home swim lessons", and is the largest swim lesson provider in North America. In 2019, it expanded operations into Australia to provide private, at-home lessons across the country.

== History ==
AquaMobile was found in 2011 by Diana Goodwin, who developed the concept at a time when she was offering swimming lessons to swimmers at a local community pool while pursuing her undergraduate degree at the Rotman School of Management in 2003. She later began offering private swimming lessons independently at clients' homes. Goodwin obtained a position as a management consultant with Bain & Company after earning her Bachelor of Commerce in 2007. As her independent aquatics business continued to grow, she left Bain to refine and grow her business at the Kellogg School of Management in 2010. The following year, Goodwin received her MBA and relaunched her swim lessons venture as AquaMobile. Goodwin created Market Box, an all-in-one scheduling and automation for service businesses, as she could not find a software that could handle the demands of her expanding business and facilitate the complex scheduling needs of instructors operating in several states, and subsequently countries

=== Current ===
Currently, AquaMobile employs more than 1,500 swim instructors worldwide, including several former Olympians. Its revenue has doubled each year since 2012 and has taught more than 10,000 students across the US, Canada, and Australia.

== Reception ==
In 2013, less than two years after its founding, AquaMobile was recognized for its impact by the Empact Showcase, hosted and awarded by the United Nations in partnership with Entrepreneur Magazine.

AquaMobile also won first-place in the 2015 Small Business Challenge, hosted by TELUS and The Globe and Mail. The grand-prize is a $100,000 grant for small businesses to scale-up, in addition to a $10,000 donation to a charity of the founder's choice.

In March 2016, Diana Goodwin appeared on Dragons' Den to pitch AquaMobile. Judges included Joe Mimran, Michele Romanow, and Jim Treliving; all three made offers, with Treliving matching Goodwin's initial request of $200,000 in exchange for a 10 percent equity stake.
