= Dragons' Den (Canadian TV series) =

Canadian television reality show

- Genre: Reality competition
- Directed by: Michele Berlyne, Joseph Interisano, Jane Wilson (current)
- Presented by: Dianne Buckner
- Starring: Arlene Dickinson; Manjit Minhas; Michele Romanow; Brian Scudamore; Wes Hall; Drew Scott
- Opening theme: "Put Yer Money Where Yer Mouth Is" by Oasis
- Country of origin: Canada
- No. of seasons: 21
- No. of episodes: 311

Production
- Producers: Tracie Tighe; Molly Middleton; Alexandra Lane; Amy Bourne
- Production locations: Toronto, Ontario
- Editors: Steve Tonon; Robert Megna
- Camera setup: Multi-camera
- Running time: 44 minutes
- Production companies: Celador (2006–2007); 2waytraffic (2007–2012); Sony Pictures Television (2012–present)

Original release
- Network: CBC Television
- Release: October 3, 2006 – present

Dragons' Den is a Canadian reality competition television series, based on the internationally franchised Dragons' Den format which began in Japan. The show debuted on October 3, 2006, on CBC Television, and is hosted by Dianne Buckner. Aspiring Canadian entrepreneurs pitch business and investment ideas to a panel of venture capitalists (termed "Dragons") in the hope of securing business financing and partnerships. The show also has a Quebec-only spin-off called Dans l'oeil du Dragon (literally 'in the Dragon's eye').

As of March 5th 2026, 311 episodes of Dragons' Den have aired.

== Format ==
Each typical episode features approximately eight pitches, along with a brief synopsis of a further three pitches which usually were rejected by the Dragons.

Each pitch begins with the entrepreneur specifying the amount they are seeking as an investment and the percentage of their business that they are offering in exchange. Entrepreneurs generally describe their business and provide financial details in respect of their costs, sales, and profit margins. Pitches range from those at the conceptual stage to full-fledged long-term businesses. The Dragons ask the entrepreneur questions in order to assess whether their business is one which they would consider investing in. Each Dragon ultimately will either make an offer to invest or will declare that they are "out", meaning they are not interested in the business. Once all five Dragons are "out", the pitch ends.

While some entrepreneurs are made offers of exactly what they are seeking, most of the offers the Dragons make either seek a greater percentage of the business (equity) or seek a royalty on the sales of the business (this has become more prevalent in later seasons). The entrepreneurs and Dragons may then engage in negotiations until the available offers are either accepted (and a "deal" is made) or rejected.

While Dragons often partner up and make joint offers, they just as often make competing offers. Each of the Dragons has a unique set of skills and connections which sometimes results in the entrepreneur being forced to choose between offers (which might be offering the same or different economic terms) based on the "added" value the specific Dragon would bring to the business.

The main "rule" as set out at the start of every episode is that the entrepreneur is not permitted to accept an offer or multiple offers unless they would receive a total investment of at least the amount that they initially sought. The main ramification of this restriction is that entrepreneurs are often criticised for over-valuing their businesses. This is because the amount sought by the entrepreneur may be more than 50% of the value of their business as perceived by the Dragons (the Dragons rarely make deals for greater than 50%) and sometimes more than the entire value of the business as perceived by the Dragons. The restriction means the Dragons cannot offer a lesser amount that is more in line with their perceived value of the business.

Notwithstanding the acceptance of offers on the show, and the handshake agreements, the offers on the show are generally subject to due diligence by both parties and many "deals" made on the show do not ultimately close or close at different terms than originally expected. The show sometimes offers updates on both deals which were made and entrepreneurs who were rejected, including certain special episodes focusing exclusively on updates.

== Dragons ==
=== Timeline of Dragons ===
Dragons	Seasons																			
Dragons	1	2	3	4	5	6	7	8	9	10	11	12	13	14	15	16	17	18	19	20
Dragons	Current																			
Arlene Dickinson		Main										Main								
Manjit Minhas										Main										
Michele Romanow										Main										
Wes Hall																Main				
Drew Scott																				Guest
	Former																			
Kevin O'Leary	Main																			
Robert Herjavec	Main																Main			
Laurence Lewin	Main																			
Jennifer Wood	Main																			
W. Brett Wilson			Main																	
Bruce Croxon						Main														
David Chilton							Main													
Vikram Vij									Main											
Michael Wekerle									Main											
Joe Mimran										Main										
Lane Merrifield													Main							—N/a
Jim Treliving	Main																			
Vincenzo Guzzo													Main							—N/a
Brian Scudamore																			Main	
Simu Liu																			Guest	—N/a
	1	2	3	4	5	6	7	8	9	10	11	12	13	14	15	16	17	18	19	20

=== Current Dragons ===
- Arlene Dickinson (Seasons 2–9, 12–present), the owner of Venture, a marketing company with offices across Canada. Announced she would be leaving the show February 13, 2015 to pursue other career aspirations. She returned in season 12.
- Manjit Minhas (Season 10–present), CEO of Minhas Craft Brewery.
- Michele Romanow (Season 10–present), Internet entrepreneur, co-founder of Clearbanc.
- Wes Hall (Season 16–present), founder and executive chairman of Kingsdale Advisors and founder and chairman of The BlackNorth Initiative.
- Brian Scudamore (Season 19), present founder and CEO of 1-800-GOT-JUNK?.
  - Drew Scott (Guest, Season 20) Main Season 21, present reality television personality, and co-founder at Scott Brothers Global.

=== Former Dragons ===
- Jim Treliving (Season 1–15), a former Royal Canadian Mounted Police officer and co-owner of Boston Pizza and Mr. Lube.
- Kevin O'Leary (Seasons 1–8), co-host of CBC News Network's business news series The Lang and O'Leary Exchange. O'Leary is the former president of The Learning Company, which was sold to Mattel for $4.2 billion in 1999. He also appears on the US version of the show, Shark Tank. On March 14, 2014, it was announced that O'Leary would not be returning to the show for season 9. On January 18, 2017, O'Leary announced his campaign for Leader of the Conservative Party of Canada.
- Robert Herjavec (Seasons 1–6, Seasons 17-18) founder of an IT security firm that he sold at the height of the dot-com bubble for over $30.2 million. Currently head of IT security firm "The Herjavec Group". He also appears on the American version of the program titled, Shark Tank as well as the Australian version, Shark Tank Australia.
- Laurence Lewin (Seasons 1 & 2), co-founder of La Senza, a chain of lingerie shops with more than 310 stores throughout Canada, and, through corporate licensees, a further 320 stores operating in 30 countries around the world. Lewin left the show for health reasons and died on November 12, 2008. The show broadcast a dedication in memory of him on November 17, 2008.
- Jennifer Wood (Season 1), an executive in Canada's beef industry. Her career in the cattle business began in 1990.
- W. Brett Wilson (Seasons 3–5) is a founder of FirstEnergy Capital Corp, a part owner of the English football team Derby County, and a minor partner in NHL's Nashville Predators team. During his time on the show, he brokered more business deals than any other Dragon on any version of the show worldwide. Said to be the most philanthropically-minded of the Canadian Dragons, he has been involved in numerous charities and participated in a CBC staff video for the online It Gets Better Project. Wilson left the show following season 5. In interviews following the announcement of his departure, Wilson criticized the show's producers for sticking to a format that favoured "abuse" and "criticism", rather than offering constructive guidance and feedback to potential entrepreneurs. He subsequently announced his own entrepreneurship-themed series, Risky Business, to air on Slice.
- Bruce Croxon (Seasons 6–8) entrepreneur.
- Michael Wekerle (Season 9–12), founder and CEO of Difference Capital.
- Joe Mimran (Season 10–12), fashion retailer formerly associated with Club Monaco and Joe Fresh.
- Lane Merrifield (Season 13–15), co-founded FreshGrade in 2011 and has since served in multiple roles, including his current position as CEO. He was previously the co-founder and CEO of Club Penguin, the largest virtual world for kids, leading the company to rapid growth and an eventual acquisition by Disney in 2007 for $350 million. After the acquisition, he spent five years as Executive Vice President of Disney Online Studios.
- Vincenzo Guzzo (Seasons 13–18), Executive Vice-President and C.O.O. of Cinémas Guzzo. Guzzo was also a 'Guest Dragon' on the current season of the Quebec version.

=== Guest Dragons ===
- Simu Liu (Guest, Season 19), Marvel Cinematic Universe actor, and general partner at Markham Valley Ventures.
- Drew Scott (Guest, Season 20) Present , reality television personality, and co-founder at Scott Brothers Global.

== Reception ==
Skeptics criticized a twelfth-season episode of Dragons' Den for its handling of a wellness company claiming to be able to improve neurological function from a distance. The company, NeuroReset, presented pieces of copper that clip onto the user's clothing and sell for $80. The founders, a golf coach and a chiropractor, claimed that the operating principle of the clips was quantum entanglement. After applying pressure to some of the investors, with and without the clips, the pair convinced five of the six Dragons to buy equity. Manjit Minhas, while not part of the final deal, expressed interest in the product as well. After the taping of the episode, the agreement fell apart in due diligence and Health Canada ruled that three NeuroReset products must be removed from sale. Joe Mimran admitted that he was deceived by the pitch.

== Overview ==
Season	Timeslot (EST)	Episodes	Season			Average TV viewership per week (millions)	Available on Netflix	Rank (viewers)	Rating	Dragons
Season	Timeslot (EST)	Episodes	Premiere	Final	Television	Average TV viewership per week (millions)	Available on Netflix	Rank (viewers)	Rating	Dragons
1	Wednesdays at 8 pm	8	October 3, 2006	November 22, 2006	2006-07	.35	No			Treliving, O'Leary, Wood, Lewin, Herjavec
2	Mondays at 8 pm	10	October 1, 2007	December 3, 2007	2007-08	▼.7	No			Treliving, O'Leary, Dickinson, Lewin, Herjavec
3	Mondays at 8 pm	12	September 29, 2008	December 15, 2008	2008-09	▲1.1	No			Treliving, O'Leary, Dickinson, Wilson, Herjavec
4	Wednesdays at 8 pm	21	September 30, 2009	May 30, 2010	2009-10	▲1.6	No			Treliving, O'Leary, Dickinson, Wilson, Herjavec
5	Wednesdays at 8 pm	21	September 22, 2010	June 11, 2011	2010-11	▼2	No			Treliving, O'Leary, Dickinson, Wilson, Herjavec
6	Wednesdays at 8 pm	22	September 14, 2011	June 3, 2012	2011-12	▲2.5	No			Treliving, O'Leary, Dickinson, Croxon, Herjavec
7	Wednesdays at 8 pm	20	September 19, 2012	April 14, 2013	2012-13	▼3.1	No			Treliving, O'Leary, Dickinson, Croxon, Chilton
8	Wednesdays at 8 pm	20	October 2, 2013	April 2, 2014	2013-14	▼2.8	No			Treliving, O'Leary, Dickinson, Croxon, Chilton
9	Wednesdays at 8 pm	20	October 15, 2014	April 8, 2015	2014-15	▼2.3	Yes			Treliving, Wekerle, Dickinson, Vij, Chilton
10	Wednesdays at 8 pm	22	October 7, 2015	April 6, 2016	2015-16		Yes			Treliving, Wekerle, Romanow, Minhas, Mimran
11	Wednesdays at 8 pm	20	October 5, 2016	March 22, 2017	2016-17	1.4	Yes			Treliving, Wekerle, Romanow, Minhas, Mimran
12	Thursdays at 8 pm	20	September 28, 2017	April 5, 2018	2017-18	▼0.519	No			Treliving, Wekerle, Romanow, Dickinson, Minhas, Mimran
13	Thursdays at 8 pm	20	September 20, 2018	March 7, 2019	2018-19		No		8.4/10(tv.com) 7.2/10(IMDb.com)	Treliving, Romanow, Dickinson, Minhas, Merrifield, Guzzo
14	Thursdays at 9 pm	9	September 26, 2019	November 21, 2019	2019-20		No			Treliving, Romanow, Dickinson, Minhas, Merrifield, Guzzo
15	Thursdays at 9 pm	10	October 22, 2020	December 17, 2020	2020-21					Treliving, Romanow, Dickinson, Minhas, Merrifield, Guzzo
16	Thursdays at 8 pm	10	October 21, 2021	December 16, 2021	2021-22					Minhas, Guzzo, Dickinson, Hall, Romanow
17	Thursdays at 8 pm	10	September 15, 2022	November 17, 2022	2022–23					Herjavec, Guzzo, Minhas, Dickinson, Hall, Romanow
18	Thursdays at 8 pm	10	September 21, 2023	November 30, 2023	2023–24					Herjavec, Guzzo, Minhas, Dickinson, Hall, Romanow
19	Thursdays at 8 pm	12	September 26, 2024	January 9, 2025	2024–25					Hall, Scudamore, Minhas, Dickinson, Romanow

== Episode description ==
Season	Episode	Company or Product Name	Description	Original air date
1	1	It's My Card, a customized gift card business; NAPP, workplace napping centres; Fast Trainer, a home portable exercise machine; Tidal Power Energy Bridge, electricity from tidal power; Organic Flax Dressing, organic salad dressings and seasonings; Magic Banana, a device to tighten kegel muscles.	An exercise machine has the Dragons lacking motivation; a tidal energy bridge gets a dose of reality; and two entrepreneurs enter the Den to pitch their magnetic gift card idea to the Dragons.	October 3, 2006
1	2		Optical store for women; self-help mood cards; an energy-saving device for computers; blanket for bath water.	October 11, 2006
1	3		A vending machine that dispenses purified water; all-natural first aid products; web-based job listing site.	October 18, 2006
1	4		A recreational ride for water parks; a new kind of popcorn bag; uniforms for petite women; plus-size lingerie line.	October 25, 2006
1	5		Underwear for men and women; a body brush for the shower; a healthy snack company.	November 1, 2006
1	6		Pet caskets; a bug museum; a haunted house; an amusement park; billboards.	November 8, 2006
1	7		A kegel exerciser; electronic gift cards; a portable barbecue.	November 15, 2006
1	8		The Dragons catch up with some of the most unforgettable entrepreneurs from the first season.	November 22, 2006
2	1		An abdominal training system; a tech news Web site; sports trivia books; a banana holder.	October 1, 2007
2	2		Diet and exercise software; helmets for sports fans; telephone-based language lessons; aromatherapy.	October 2, 2007
2	3		A Calgary tea shop; a racy reality series; a weight-loss tent; a lumberjack tries to save marriages one board game at a time.	October 15, 2007
2	4		A line of punk-inspired baby clothes; a device to detect electromagnetic waves; a vacuum for horses; a walking aid.	October 22, 2007
2	5		Indian spices; a small razor; a rifle scope; an online directory for hairstylists; harnessing energy from the gym to help power homes.	October 29, 2007
2	6		Custom-made jeans; homemade dog biscuits; a prosthetic bra; a perforated pizza box; an inflatable skateboard amusement ride.	November 5, 2007
2	7	Saxx Apparel	A trailer to transport show dogs; submersible vehicles; Trent Kitsch pitches men's briefs; an ID tag for luggage.	November 12, 2007
2	8		A hygienic seat cover and poncho; custom stationary; fruit picking; sweet tomato jam.	November 19, 2007
2	9		Pure spring water; a breakfast cereal bar; a baby carrier for the pool; a snow shovel on wheels; a filing system.	November 26, 2007
2	10		Hydroponic produce; Christmas product ideas; a line of medicinal equine treats.	December 3, 2007
3	1		A dog who wants to be famous; a golf shoe sparks a bidding war.	September 29, 2008
3	2		Software for teachers; Roll up the Rim; a Canadian sombrero.	October 6, 2008
3	3		A spicy BBQ sauce; hot dogs; anti-freeze; a system for parking tickets.	October 13, 2008
3	4		Reading aids; a beauty-tainment; a snack business.	October 20, 2008
3	5		An eager entrepreneur in the wine business attempts to impress the dragons.	October 27, 2008
3	6		A former pro wrestler presents a barbell system; a florist attempts to grow his business.	November 3, 2008
3	7		An inventor with a history of bad luck changes his fortunes; a sleep-aid sets off the Dragons' alarms; and giving the boot to a sexy business proposal. Plus, a young inventor's futuristic vehicle revs things up.	November 10, 2008
3	8	Essentia	A good night's sleep; Robert makes a sweet offer. Jack Dell'Accio pitches Essentia mattresses.	November 17, 2008
3	9		A chilly invention turns up the heat; eco-invention.	November 24, 2008
3	10		Golf tees; musical games; magical numbers; moonshade blinds.	December 1, 2008
3	11		A deli drives back into the Den; a tanning business returns; an entrepreneur from season one; a fast food idea.	December 8, 2008
3	12		The dragons and some of the most memorable entrepreneurs weigh in on what went right and what went wrong in the den.	December 15, 2008
4	1		Students strip down; Kevin upgrades a travel website; the dragons get feisty over a business.	September 30, 2009
4	2		Twins present a line of lip gloss; a husband and wife duo; an eco-friendly clothing line.	October 7, 2009
4	3		A dance troupe shakes things up; an entrepreneur begs for cash; a tattoo business; lunchtime.	October 14, 2009
4	4		A casino dealer; a medical marijuana business; cell phone users.	October 21, 2009
4	5		Hopefuls try to turn dough into dollars; Arlene supports a bra business; Elvis impersonators.	October 28, 2009
4	6		A snowboard; an auto repair shop; table hockey.	November 4, 2009
4	7		What some of the most memorable entrepreneurs have been up to since their experience in the Den.	November 11, 2009
4	8		An offer makes fishermen greedy; DJ school; a fitness show for toddlers.	November 18, 2009
4	9		A sparkly swimsuit; a holistic healer; a Website that promotes recycling.	November 25, 2009
4	10		Diamonds made from an unlikely source; an underwear company; a board game.	December 2, 2009
4	11		A winter hat; futuristic living goes up in smoke; a familiar face braves the Den again.	December 9, 2009
4	12		A new tool; a top home designer is willing to put her name on the line.	January 6, 2010
4	13		A sauce business; a spray; a dress that provokes disagreement.	January 13, 2010
4	14		A computer mouse; a helmet for safety and style; a spa business.	January 20, 2010
4	15		A fruit basket; a revealing board game; an organic juice business.	January 27, 2010
4	16		A diaper delivery service; a scale; a boating business; a mailbox pitch.	February 3, 2010
4	17		The Dragons are treated to dessert; a condom that is safe for the environment; a board game.	February 10, 2010
4	18		The dragons go in on a million dollar offer; an eco-friendly business; a harness for puppies.	March 3, 2010
4	19		A rock business fighting the recession; a vodka business dances for dollars.	March 10, 2010
5	1		An inflatable toy; a textbook rental service; a waffle business.	September 22, 2010
5	2		The Dragons put in an offer on a group buying website; a brother and sister duo may need to throw out the baby with the bath water.	September 29, 2010
5	3		A little drama helps sell a business; a juice jug that's ready to stir things up; a chair company brings a splash of color.	October 6, 2010
5	4		Germaphobic travelers; innovative bathroom solutions.	October 13, 2010
5	5		A man believes he's got the cure for sleepless doggie nights; a new hand sanitizer business gets slimed; Don Cherry stops by the Den.	October 20, 2010
5	6		Budding entrepreneurs pitch their ideas to wealthy investors.	November 3, 2010
5	7		A father-son duo; a breakfast cereal feeds a bidding frenzy.	November 10, 2010
5	8		Two entrepreneurs look to revitalize their strained business; a new puzzle has the Dragons racing to make an offer; and a memorable visit from the king of rock 'n' roll.	November 17, 2010
5	9		A filtered water business makes a splash in the Den; a delivery service that has even the postman blushing; and a small bathroom product that plans to make a big difference.	November 24, 2010
5	10		An idea for a new film; a new board game sparks some Dragon cheer; a light storage solution.	December 8, 2010
5	11		Several lucky entrepreneurs from past seasons are given another chance to score a deal.	January 5, 2011
5	12		Dried honey products; a language software.	January 19, 2011
5	13		A new spin on riding a bike to work; laundry detergent that is environment friendly.	January 26, 2011
5	14		An eco-friendly idea; a health conscious couple; a shipping container full of potential; a snappy idea from a mother of five.	February 2, 2011
5	15		A new truck gadget; a stock trade board game; a barbershop with an appealing offer.	February 9, 2011
5	16		A duo begs the Dragons for cash; a takeout food container.	February 16, 2011
5	17		A DVD that will keep golfers playing nice on the green; one size fits all pants; an electric boat.	March 2, 2011
5	18		A pitcher sweats it out when the Dragons turn up the heat; a tasty snack in need of a healthy investment.	March 9, 2011
5	19		A poop and scoop business; eyewear to match your every look; a gadget that will make sure you're never caught speeding again.	March 23, 2011
5	20		the Dragons battle it out over some of the best ideas ever brought to the Den.	March 30, 2011
6	1		An all-natural practitioner gets a dose of reality; a coffee company; water idea.	September 14, 2011
6	2		An opera performance; novelty products; cashing in on unwanted gifts.	September 21, 2011
6	3		The Dragons are taught the importance of an easy day; a celebrity chef tries to cook up a deal.	September 28, 2011
6	4		A pet website; an online magazine; the Dragons get carried away by a Bottle Bin.	October 5, 2011
6	5		A fitness ball; a foam saver; men's underwear; a waterless car wash.	October 12, 2011
6	6		A student/stockbroker; a teenage Formula Tour driver; headwear with earphones; students hope the Dragons jump on the note-taking bandwagon.	October 26, 2011
6	7		Smoked meat on wheels; a racy pitch; a housing idea.	November 2, 2011
6	8		A four-legged fashion show; a golf jacket.	November 9, 2011
6	9		A gym; golf; raw food; crutches.	November 30, 2011
6	10		A dual-purpose bag; the value of freedom; a realtor website; a pitcher fights back.	December 7, 2011
6	11		Holiday wrapping; seasonal lights; a holiday treat.	December 14, 2011
6	12		Past pitchers are back for a second chance; men's underwear; helmet wrap; a dog festival; a natural soap.	January 11, 2012
6	13		An exercise aid creates tension; a massage franchise.	January 18, 2012
6	14		A spectator garment hopes for fans; a homegrown idea.	January 25, 2012
6	15		A group puts up barriers in the den; a shakable pancake powder; a specialty clothing line.	February 1, 2012
6	16		Magnets; a small business; a candy company.	February 8, 2012
6	17		Checking in with some of the most memorable entrepreneurs; the Dragons reflect on their deals.	February 29, 2012
6	18		The friend-zone; a nutrient-rich powder; a masculine ski mask; a natural sweetener.	March 7, 2012
6	19		A toilet accessory; a hockey website; an Internet-based shop for every occasion; a clam diver.	March 14, 2012
6	20		Branded phone casings; a water dispenser; a home improvement invention; a hangover cure.	March 21, 2012
6	21		Dianne and the Dragons reflect on six incredible seasons in the Den.	June 3, 2012
7	1		Entrepreneurs who were unsuccessful in the past try again to make their businesses work; a niche product draws the Dragons out of their comfort zone.	September 19, 2012
7	2		A distillery business hopes for an investment; a posture perfectionist; a yard work tool; a pitcher takes flight in the den.	September 26, 2012
7	3		The Dragons let loose; a beauty business; a realty business bares all; a breath of fresh air from an apparel company.	October 3, 2012
7	4		Sisters from a small town hope for an investment in their tasty business; the Dragons are invited to a new type of party.	October 10, 2012
7	5		The Dragons enjoy martinis; the gloves are off; a Dragon swing goes out of bounds; school fundraising.	October 24, 2012
7	6		Toe to toe with a young entrepreneur; quiz time; a small entrepreneur with a big heart; a concert.	October 31, 2012
7	7		Cuddling with furry friends; the best burger; an automobile accessory; a fashion show.	November 14, 2012
7	8		A unique exercise; things get dirty; a family business; a memorable market.	November 21, 2012
7	9		A dental emergency from a tasty pitch; a feathered friend; a helmet innovation.	November 28, 2012
7	10		A winter tool attachment; a redesigned holiday classic; a money game; a line of action figures.	December 5, 2012
7	11		A deli drives back into the Den; a tanning business returns; an entrepreneur from season one; a fast food idea.	January 6, 2013
7	12		The Dragons test their fitness skills; a franchise opportunity; the largest ask ever; a Prairie product creates buzz.	January 13, 2013
7	13		The Dragons' receive a performance; up close and personal; a multimillion-dollar valuation; a food topping.	January 20, 2013
7	14		A duo charms with their trinkets; software for children; a paper packing company; an office compost service.	January 27, 2013
7	15		A showerhead invention; a dating site in need of a partner; a chocolate bar; a classic gets a meaty spin.	February 10, 2013
7	16		A baby product prevents a big mess; an energy idea; words of encouragement; a handy entrepreneur.	February 17, 2013
7	17		A snack fit for a king; an artist's body of work; a food entrepreneur; a Guinness World Record holder.	March 24, 2013
7	18		A detox delivery business; an artist with a Disney dream; a golden opportunity; a pepper spray entrepreneur.	March 31, 2013
7	19		A new step for women's footwear; eyeglass entrepreneurs; a bicycle innovation; a ride share business.	April 7, 2013
7	20		A year in the public and private lives of the Dragons and their secrets to success.	April 14, 2013
8	1		A brand new den is revealed; a snack company; a denim company; a couple's solution to a problem; a tech company hopes to launch their product.	October 2, 2013
8	2		A tough sword to swallow; a father and daughter's invention; an entrepreneur jumps through hoops; turning wasted food into healthy profits.	October 9, 2013
8	3		The Dragons get flushed; a demonstration is halted; a silent skit causes confusion.	October 16, 2013
8	4		An established business tries to get a deal; a pitcher horses around; a tasty treat; a men's shoe company tries to measure up.	October 23, 2013
8	5		A search for a deal; when it rains, it pours; a family favourite; a team effort.	October 30, 2013
8	6		One of the Dragons gets whipped into shape; a pitcher tries to score a deal; a trip through time; a food pitch stirs up the competition.	November 6, 2013
8	7		The Dragons show off their dance moves; an idea targets a mess; a high-pitched pitch; the Dragons learn that entrepreneurship has no age limits.	November 13, 2013
8	8		An entrepreneur returns in need of a Dragon partner; a natural product; a Dragon is stretched thin; a pair hoping for a smooth ride.	November 20, 2013
8	9		An owner rides circles around the Dragons; a pitch with a lot to digest; a business has its customers drooling; a promise to keep the Dragons from running on empty.	December 4, 2013
8	10		A festive fashion faux pas; a pitcher has the whole package; a frosty invention; a pitcher tries to keep the Dragons' interest.	December 11, 2013
8	11		Elvis is back in the building; a fitness enthusiast returns; a thirsty pitcher wants a second chance; brothers who are willing to bet the farm.	January 8, 2014
8	12	Fix Me Stick	A pitcher has sun protection covered; a connection to the earth; business partners hope a deal will help their business explode. Marty Algire and Corey Velan from Montreal, CA pitch the "Fix Me Stick"	January 15, 2014
8	13		A pitcher hopes to bag a deal; a pitch leaves a lasting impression; a couple looks for EZ money; two partners hope to have a recipe for success.	January 22, 2014
8	14		A pair of business partners try to sweet-talk the Dragons; a kayak company; a couple prays for a successful pitch; four friends with their own brew.	January 29, 2014
8	15		An inventor puts the Dragons in the hot seat; a couple tries to nurse a deal; an entrepreneur tries to flip the Dragons; an idea gets the Dragons rolling in money.	February 26, 2014
8	16		A pitch puts the Dragons on the edge of their seats; a farming family; business partners hope they can arouse some interest; one man's trash is another man's treasure.	March 5, 2014
8	17		A Bollywood-inspired business idea; a solution for sagging pants; an entrepreneur's flavourful pitch.	March 12, 2014
8	18		An idea to take the sting out of summer; the Dragons nearly get put to sleep; friends hope for a smooth experience.	March 19, 2014
8	19		The Dragons are challenged to man-up; a lasting impression; the Dragons take a bite out of a family business.	March 26, 2014
8	20		The Dragons visit some unforgettable pitchers, some who landed deals, some that got rejected or some who say the Dragons got it wrong.	April 2, 2014
9	1		A married couple try to get a rise out of the Dragons; an entrepreneur hopes that he's got enough material; a major solution to a minor problem.	October 15, 2014
9	2		A new Dragon tightens his wallet; hopefuls give an athletic pitch; siblings try to yodel their way to a deal; a product the Dragons can sink their teeth into.	October 22, 2014
9	3		An entrepreneur with a cheeky business; a product with a cheesy pitch; an established entrepreneur has a pitch for the Dragons.	October 29, 2014
9	4		The Dragons' must choose fantasy or reality; an entrepreneur tries to swipe a deal; a duo tries to ice their opponents; the Dragons are humbled.	November 5, 2014
9	5		A couple believe they have the magic touch; two business majors have an international idea; the youngest hopeful ever has a lunch-break idea; four brothers teach the Dragons.	November 12, 2014
9	6		The mood in the Den gets amplified; an entrepreneur hopes to paint a greener future; a family hopes to cook up a deal; a multimillion-dollar request.	November 19, 2014
9	7		A chic entrepreneur heats things up; a romantic pitch; a handy entrepreneur presents his idea; a business gets some professional help.	November 26, 2014
9	8		An entrepreneur challenges convention; a snowboarder tries to keep his cool; a business gets everything on their wish list; an inventor hopes his product will drive sales.	December 3, 2014
9	9		Two return hoping their new line is a perfect fit; a couple return with a new product; an entrepreneur hopes the third time is the charm; a successful entrepreneur returns for an even bigger deal.	January 7, 2015
9	10		An entrepreneur hopes a game of catch will score a deal; a hero swoops into the Den; an entrepreneur presents the fruits of her labour; a team hopes for a second chance.	January 14, 2015
9	11		A musical entrepreneur tries to score a deal; a store owner lays it all on the table; a pair hope to ice out big industry players; business partners pitch their truly Canadian beverage.	January 21, 2015
9	12		The Dragons compete over a protective product; an entrepreneur bares it all; an eco-friendly solution to a monthly problem; athletes hope the Dragons will join their team.	January 28, 2015
9	13		An entrepreneur believes he can be an industry ringleader; a flashy product burns a Dragon; a product with an outlawed origin; a green product has the Dragons seeing red.	February 4, 2015
9	14		A family has a twist on tradition; cousins ride into the Den with bells on; a business has a tropical solution; a family's inspirational story.	February 11, 2015
9	15		A legendary creature appears in the Den; the Dragons are on edge over an adventurous business model; a wild opportunity presents itself; a delivery business offers its pitch.	February 18, 2015
9	16		Business partners demonstrate how they'll wipe away the competition; an entrepreneur explains his strategy; a family is confident in their product; a business tries to prove they can become an industry leader.	March 4, 2015
9	17		Three friends hope to toast to a deal; two nurses hope the Dragons want in; an entrepreneur sticks out her neck; a CEO looks for some seed money.	March 11, 2015
9	18		A company asks for a shot; an entrepreneur presents his product; an entrepreneur has a bitter story; a couple believe they have a solution to a hot problem.	March 18, 2015
9	19		A company tries to scare the Dragons into a deal; an entrepreneur has a cap-in-hand presentation.	April 1, 2015
9	20		Celebrating the biggest deals of the season; the Dragons share their success secrets.	April 8, 2015
10	1		Three new Dragons enter the Den; a product gets the Dragons thirsty for a deal; a business bares it all; two brothers pitch to the Dragons.	October 7, 2015
10	2		The Dragons get help from a furry friend; a family's twist on a traditional treat; a graphic artist pitches her business; the Dragons decide if a product sinks or swims.	October 14, 2015
10	3		A product sparks a bidding war after warming the dragons' hearts; a dragon's gaming skills are put to the test; an entrepreneur hopes the dragons won't chicken out; a business looks to inspire a bionic deal.	October 28, 2015
10	4		A company hopes to win a deal; an entrepreneur is put on ice; a farmer serves a taste of her bubbly business.	November 4, 2015
10	5		A company hopes the Dragons will toast to a deal; an entrepreneur peels back the layers of her business.	November 11, 2015
10	6		A university student tries to spin a deal; two guests help a student school the dragons; business partners don't want to be left in the dark; siblings turn up the heat and teach the dragons not to underestimate students.	November 18, 2015
10	7		An artist hopes to sing his way into the dragons' hearts; partners present an enlightening demonstration; a trio must make a decision before an offer melts; business partners hope to team up with a dragon.	November 25, 2015
10	8		A food chain offers a twist on a Canadian classic; two friends hope a contest will score them a deal; a father and son aim to land a partner; a boxer tries to get a Dragon on his team.	December 2, 2015
10	9		An entrepreneur discovers which Dragons are naughty or nice; brothers want to warm up cool attitudes; a company has special gifts for the Dragons.	December 9, 2015
10	10		An entrepreneur gets back on the horse; a returning company thinks it can break a sweat in an out-of-shape market; a man brings his business back to the table; a team returns with a hardy opportunity.	January 6, 2016
10	11		The Dragons battle it out; two parents try to woo the Dragons; a food chain offers a tasty proposition; an entrepreneur with a soothing solution.	January 13, 2016
10	12		An entrepreneur has some slick moves; the Dragons are panicked after a puzzling pitch; a business plan with a few kinks; a company returns in the hopes of scoring a home run.	January 20, 2016
10	13		An entrepreneur hopes the Dragons will roll the dice; an inventor returns for an investment; a tourism company; a techpreneur gets a virtual-reality check.	January 27, 2016
10	14		An entrepreneur hopes the Dragons will float her some cash; a paint innovator hopes for a smooth finish; the Den gets dressed up; a former hockey player hopes to score big.	February 3, 2016
10	15		A company's past is more than relative; a husband and wife present their products; sisters present their fashion line; a family's food concept presents the Dragons with a cut of the business.	February 10, 2016
10	16	Knixwear	Updates on past pitchers who are putting their investments to good use and fan favorites. Joanna Griffiths pitches Knixwear.	February 24, 2016
10	17		A fresh idea is presented to the Dragons; the Dragons share their opinions with a trio; a DNA-based business; an active pitch breaks down barriers.	March 2, 2016
10	18		Brothers hope for a long-term partner for their short-term product; a curious fashion show; a family presents a durable demo; a beauty product's secret ingredient is revealed.	March 9, 2016
10	19		A sports-themed company is ready to lay it all on the table; an inventor presents his prototype; a pair of entrepreneurs present a solution for a pesky problem.	March 16, 2016
10	20		Businesses compete against one another and the Dragons decide which will continue their pitch.	March 23, 2016
10	21		The Dragons see a colourful pitch; a business hopes to grow organically; a pet business tries to get a clean deal; a fitness pitch has the Dragons sweating.	March 30, 2016
10	22		Past and present Dragons share their favourite memories; looking back at the past 10 years of inspiring pitches by Canadian small businesses.	April 6, 2016
11	1		A business hopes to leave the Dragons hungry for more; a product works to remove the stink in the Den; a family business hopes for a deal; a financial education platform needs serious interest from the Dragons.	October 5, 2016
11	2		An entrepreneur breaks down more than just numbers; a designer hopes for a perfect pitch; a family with rich history hopes to get the Dragons seeing dollars; the Dragons receive a tasty proposition.	October 12, 2016
11	3		Hockey dads think their product can go head-to-head against the competition; a company aims to flip the switch on the DIY market; the Dragons believe a business model is a stroke of genius; a green product has the Dragons seeing red.	October 19, 2016
11	4		Hockey dads think their product can go head-to-head against the competition; a company aims to flip the switch on the DIY market; the Dragons believe a business model is a stroke of genius; a green product has the Dragons seeing red.	October 26, 2016
11	5		A fitness company tests the Dragons; a request brews up some objections; an entrepreneur hopes for an organic partnership; a longtime business needs the Dragons' help before it slips through the cracks.	November 2, 2016
11	6		A fitness company tests the Dragons; a request brews up some objections; an entrepreneur hopes for an organic partnership; a longtime business needs the Dragons' help before it slips through the cracks.	November 16, 2016
11	7		A clothing business proves that less isn't more; the Dragons' tempers short-circuit; serving a mouth-watering meal in the Den; an entrepreneur believes that he can get the Dragons on the same wavelength.	November 23, 2016
11	8		Tensions rise when a company turns up the volume; an entrepreneur presents a sweet deal; the Dragons question a company's projections; a husband and wife duo believe adding a Dragon to their group will wash away the competition.	November 30, 2016
11	9		A family decks the halls with a hot offer; two entrepreneurs have a festive presentation; a couple returns with high hopes.	December 7, 2016
11	10		A fantasy face-off has everyone up in arms; a trio returns thirsty for a deal; a re-evaluation gets the Dragons to weigh their odds; a family hopes to get a second deal.	January 11, 2017
11	11		The Dragons share the origins of their success and reflect on their careers.	January 18, 2017
11	12		A company hopes some furry friends will help it catch a deal; an entrepreneur is caught flat-footed; a salesman tries to wheel and deal; a business hopes to get the green light from the Dragons.	January 25, 2017
11	13		A student entrepreneur believes her business is a class above the rest; a duo teaches the Dragons that age isn't an obstacle; a trio presents an easier way to purchase feminine essentials; a young entrepreneur is in high spirits when presenting his knowledge.	February 1, 2017
11	14		First generation Canadians share their stories; a family presents a new breakfast item; a married couple present the Dragons with a taste of their culture; a mobile service offers smiles from ear to ear.	February 8, 2017
11	15		Siblings try to secure a clean deal; a business offers a twist on a classic condiment; a father and son duo hopes to turn their virtual dream into a reality; a family hopes to prove that their business is in top shape.	February 15, 2017
11	16		A business promises its proposal won't be hard to swallow; a hockey fan hopes to score; entrepreneurs present a new invention; an entrepreneur hopes her app will fill a health industry gap.	February 22, 2017
11	17		A fresh idea is presented to the Dragons; the Dragons share their opinions with a trio; a DNA-based business; an active pitch breaks down barriers.	March 1, 2017
11	18		Brothers hope for a long-term partner for their short-term product; a curious fashion show; a family presents a durable demo; a beauty product's secret ingredient is revealed.	March 8, 2017
11	19		A sports-themed company is ready to lay it all on the table; an inventor presents his prototype; a pair of entrepreneurs present a solution for a pesky problem.	March 15, 2017
11	20		Businesses compete against one another and the Dragons decide which will continue their pitch.	March 22, 2017
12	1		This two-hour special features ten Canadian businesses hoping to score a deal with the Dragons	September 28, 2017
12	2		A company thinks rt will be barking up the right tree with the help of a few celebrity endorsements, a trampoline studio seeks a strategic partner, and more,	October 5, 2017
12	3		A strong couple powers their way through their pitch, Inds gear up to bring safety to the Den and much more,	October 12, 2017
12	4		A tween author publishes an inspiring future, Waterloo students pitch their innovative health product which makes the Dragons skip a beat, and more,	October 19, 2017
12	5		A couple of business partners pop the question to the Dragons, a brilliant inventor impresses the Den with his big idea, and more!	October 26, 2017
12	6	Endy Sleep	A guitarist plans to sync the right Dragon to rock on a deal, Mike Gettis and Aashish Nathwani pitch a mattress product called Endy Sleep.	November 2, 2017
12	7		The Den honours Canadian heroes in the Heroes Special	November 9, 2017
12	8		An entrepreneur hopes to extinguish Dragon doubt over his product, a sneakerhead wants to prove that his company is the perfect fit for a Dragon investment and more,	November 16, 2017
12	9		Why Didn't I Think of That? The Dragons get an eye-opening glimpse at innovations in Canada and what it takes to turn a good idea into a great business.	November 23, 2017
12	10		An art dealer reveals his custom royalty peg... the Dragons, an ice cream lover shows the Dragons how to roll, and more,	November 30, 2017
12	11		Holiday-themed businesses face the Dragons with great gift, stocking staffers and some shocking proposals—all with hopes of getting the Dragons to channel their inner Santa	December 7, 2017
12	12		In this second chance special, a circus troupe leaves the Dragons in awe, a successful father and daughter duo think their new product shall stick, and more,	January 11, 2018
12	13		Sparks fly in the Den over whether one business is as bright as some Dragons may think, a flashy demonstration aims to get the Dragons off their feet, and more,	January 18, 2018
12	14		A trio of brothers makes more than just a splash in the Den, the Dragons get charged up over an attractive investment opportunity, and more,	January 25, 2018
12	15		A father-son team looks to drive their concept home by playing it safe, a family business hopes the Dragons won't send them packing, and more,	February 1, 2018
12	16		Paul Sun-linking Lee, guest-hosts a new special episode that welcomes back some of the most unforgettable pitchers from the last 12 seasons	March 1, 2018
12	17		An auto enthusiast hopes to drive away with a deal, a fitness enthusiast saw her energetic demo will help the Dragons get a grip and more,	March 8, 2018
12	18		An entrepreneur ndes into the Den thirsty for an investment, a group of students hope the Dragons turn their virtual dream into a reality, and more,	March 15, 2018
12	19		Taekwondo athletes enter the Den fighting, a financially fit duo hope to prove they can make every cent count, and more,	March 29, 2018
12	20		A thirst-quenching proposal has the Dragons energized for a deal, a volcano owner goes up against Dragon fire, and much more,	April 5, 2018
13	1		In the season premiere, two new Dragons bring their expertise to the panel.	September 20, 2018
13	2		A gym owner seeks a strategic partner to row his business to the top, a duo seeks investment for a paper product they hope the Dragons will eat up, and much more,	September 27, 2018
13	3		An inventive mother looks to show the Dragons she doesn't make rash decisions, a company hopes the Dragons can stomach their business proposal, and more!	October 4, 2018
13	4		For the first time ever, Dragons' Den pulls back the curtain to reveal the exciting inner workings of Canada's favourite business show.	October 11, 2018
13	5		Are We Dragons are ready to cash in on Canada, newest cash crops	October 18, 2018
13	6		A duo hopes they add isn't off key, a caffeine product needs a Dragon boost, and much more,	October 25, 2018
13	7		An entrepreneur reveals the 'tooth' about dental hygiene, a theatrical team aims to be the highlight of We show and more!	November 1, 2018
13	8		A table-top discussion sparks Dragon competition, pet enthusiasts hope to bark up the right money tree and more!	November 8, 2018
13	9		From the tech world to the oil rigs, the side hustle entrepreneurs leave behind their day jobs to show the Dragons they have the skills to make their passion a full-time pursuit	November 15, 2018
13	10	Transformer Table	A team of entrepreneurs hopes the Dragons sell gush over their business, a group of friends look to transform the furniture industry and more'	November 22, 2018
13	11		Our entrepreneurs aim to win over the Dragons' inner Scrooge with their winter themed gear, meals, and stocking stutters.	November 29, 2019
13	12		In this Student Special, the Dragons are about to get schooled as students give them a lesson in their business ideas.	January 10, 2019
13	13		A trio hopes to get some Dragon bucks for their take on a tux, an entrepreneur looks to continue his cycle of success, and more!	January 17, 2019
13	14		A team of estheticians create a hairy situation in the Den, a hockey coach reveals a game-changing invention, and more!	January 24, 2019
13	15		A couple is taking baby steps towards growing their prototype into a big business, an electrician thinks that a Dragon partner would fit his business like a glove, and more!	January 31, 2019
13	16		A team of triathletes hopes their pitch doesn't leave them hearing crickets, an inventor aims to plant the seed for an investment, and more!	February 7, 2019
13	17		The Dragons are fired up and looking for passionate pitchers and proposals, hoping to make the perfect partnership in the Den.	February 14, 2019
13	18		With support from they loved ones behind the scenes, will these companies expand their family tree to include a Dragon?	February 21, 2019
13	19		A furniture company wants to avoid getting drilled by the Dragons, a yoga instructor hopes to bring some zen into the Den with some furry friends, and more!	February 28, 2019
13	20		Proven entrepreneurs need Dragon dollars to take them to the next level.	March 7, 2019
14	1		Thrill-seeker pitches an extreme innovation; two friends present an eco-friendly concept.	March 3, 2021
14	2		A couple seeks investment correction; a salesman and a creative duo pitch their ideas; a family business proposes a deal.	March 3, 2021
14	3		An athlete enlists help for their venture; a trio pitches a decorative idea; a clean-tech entrepreneur seeks investment; a father introduces a unique product.	March 3, 2021
14	4		A company presents a valuable proposition; an entrepreneur showcases their work ethic; a business aims for a successful pitch; a trio seeks a nautical-themed deal.	March 3, 2021
14	5		Family businesses pitch their ventures, involving siblings, parents, and children.	March 3, 2021
14	6		A chocolate company seeks a sweet investment; an entrepreneur displays a positive mindset; a health coach pitches for business growth.	March 3, 2021
14	7		Students turn trash into treasure; an entrepreneur advocates for sustainable fashion; a team proposes a noise-reduction solution.	March 3, 2021
14	8		Partners pitch an intoxicating idea; a student seeks a deep investment in their business.	March 3, 2021
14	DisruptDen Special:		Entrepreneurs present game-changing, disruptive ideas, seeking the Dragons' risk-taking interest.	March 3, 2021
15	1		Firefighters present a competitive solution; brothers pitch a homemade innovation; an entrepreneur showcases footwork; a couple seeks dairy-related investment.	October 22, 2020
15	2		A joyful entrepreneur seeks a pet-friendly deal; an inventor looks for a perfect match; clean-tech partners pitch; an entrepreneur presents a valuable material business.	October 29, 2020
15	3		Confectioners offer a historic taste; a young entrepreneur showcases a jumping app; an inventor faces a close shave.	November 5, 2020
15	4	Hardbacon	Julien Brault pitches a mobile financial app called Hardbacon; industrial worker seeks a lucrative cleaning solution.	November 12, 2020
15	5		Home-brew concept pitched; student presents après-ski invention; duo sends a memorable message.	November 19, 2020
15	6		Friends challenge swimwear stigma; entrepreneurs gingerly pitch; duo revitalizes traditional skill.	November 26, 2020
15	7		Friends pitch sustainable product for profit; entrepreneur spices up the Den.	December 3, 2020
15	8		Partners smooth out their business proposal; event operator makes a pitch; engineer focuses on waste management; east coast duo seeks success.	December 10, 2020
15	9		Duo hits sweet spot with pitch; entrepreneur gets familiar help; friends pitch a business; partners present a tea-related invention.	December 17, 2020
16	1		New Dragon joins panel; entrepreneur pitches cycling venture; teacher seeks software investment; event planner and young entrepreneur present their ideas.	October 21, 2021
16	2		Fitness duo, fashion entrepreneur seek investment; mother pitches adventure subscription; siblings propose mobile concept.	October 28, 2021
16	3		Racer introduces virtual event concept; couple pitches wave-riding business.	November 4, 2021
16	4		Entrepreneur presents his product; environmentalist pitches recycling venture; cat enthusiast seeks positive response; industrial worker aims for gold extraction.	November 11, 2021
16	6		Entrepreneur values business highly; siblings pitch liquid asset concept; family seeks suitable Dragon partner; entrepreneur introduces distilling trend.	November 25, 2021
16	7		Chiropractor seeks investment; couple demonstrates determination in business.	December 2, 2021
16	8		Siblings encourage Dragons' playfulness; journalist pitches lucrative idea.	December 9, 2021
16	9		Childhood friends pitch baggage-related business; brothers seek to impress with a modular concept.	December 16, 2021
16	10		Entrepreneur seeks Dragon team member; husband-wife duo pitch for business growth.	December 16, 2021
17	1		Former Dragon returns; entrepreneur pitches seafood innovation; siblings seek investment for optical product; mompreneur and friends reveal ideas.	September 15, 2022
17	2		Plant enthusiasts seek growth; backpacker demonstrates lifelong entrepreneurship; cousins emphasize family importance; bubbly entrepreneur quenches investment thirst.	September 22, 2022
17	3		Maritimers pitch sparkling product; entrepreneurs aim to boost finances; teacher-turned-business owner adapts; friends excitedly showcase briefs.	September 29, 2022
17	4		Duo aims to cut through bureaucracy; entrepreneurs face pricing challenges; married couple seize opportunity; former teacher appeals to Dragons' appetites.	October 6, 2022
17	5		Mother establishes Den presence; entrepreneur reveals new concept; student aims to protect assets; familiar face seeks saucy return.	October 15, 2022
17	6		Couple engages in numbers game; entrepreneur wraps Dragons in business; engineer and doctor seek endorsement; marketer finds fitting partner for berry venture.	October 20, 2022
17	7		Entrepreneur tackles street cleaning; restaurateurs noodle over potential investment; student presents muscle-building opportunity; partners anticipate Dragons' reactions.	October 27, 2022
17	8		Distillers seek deal; east coast team pitches music product; a pitch with a company gets tense; business partners pitch an investment.	November 3, 2022
17	9	Charmy Pet Box	Entrepreneurs; married couple make pitches; Zach Sheng and Senia Wang pitch Charmy Pet Box dog treats; entrepreneur pitches a plant-based business.	November 10, 2022
17	10	Sweetapolita, Parked Auto, Lobster Made Easy, Umay Rest	Mother-daughter team makes impact; married couple seeks cleanliness and splash; designer demonstrates custom product; decorated entrepreneur ignites Dragons' interest.	November 17, 2022

== Awards ==
- On June 13, 2011, Dragons' Den was named best reality program at the Banff World Television Festival.
- Canadian Screen Award for Best Reality/Competition Program or Series
- Gemini Award for Best Reality Program or Series

== Spin-offs ==
Two spinoff shows featuring Dragons on their own have been created, Redemption Inc. with Kevin O'Leary, and, The Big Decision with Arlene Dickinson & Jim Treliving.
