= Bruce Croxon =

Canadian entrepreneur (born 1960)

- Born: January 1, 1960 (age 66); Canada
- Occupation: Entrepreneur

Bruce Croxon (born January 1, 1960) is a Canadian entrepreneur, television personality, and venture capitalist. He is currently a partner at Round13 Capital and co-host of BNN's TV show The Disruptors. Croxon co-founded the dating website Lavalife, and was on the cast of CBC's Dragons' Den from 2011 to 2013.

== Lavalife ==
Croxon co-founded Lavalife in 1987 with partners Nick Paine, David Chamandy and Ed Lum. Partner, chairman and CEO Croxon helped lead the company's growth, achieving revenue of just under $100 million with over two million users. In 2004, he led the sale of the company for US$152.5 million to MemberWorks.

== Dragons' Den ==
Croxon was a Dragon on CBC's Dragons' Den from 2011 to 2013 alongside Canadian entrepreneurs Jim Treliving, Kevin O'Leary, Robert Herjavec, David Chilton and Arlene Dickinson. The program showcased Canadian entrepreneurs' business pitches to a panel of venture capitalists ("Dragons") for financing and partnerships. Croxon made several investments on the show, including Balzac's Coffee and Custom Tattoo Design. He left the show in 2013 because "Round 13 is ramping up and I need to focus."

== Round 13 Capital ==
Round 13 Capital was founded in Toronto, Ontario, by Croxon and his partners John Eckert and Scott Pelton in 2012. "Round 13 Capital is a growth-stage venture capital firm that invests in Canadian companies with the potential of becoming monster hits. The firm seeks to invest in technology and digital sector in Canada."

== The Disruptors ==
The Disruptors is a TV show that airs weekly on Business News Network. It follows the most exciting international business news trends, offering expert analysis and advice to smaller Canadian companies looking to expand fast. Croxon co-hosts the show alongside BNN anchor Amber Kanwar. "The program promises to introduce viewers — traditional business leaders and investors — to the latest technologies from around the world as well as to Canadian tech entrepreneurs who are changing the way we live and work."
