= Michele Romanow =

Canadian entrepreneur and television personality

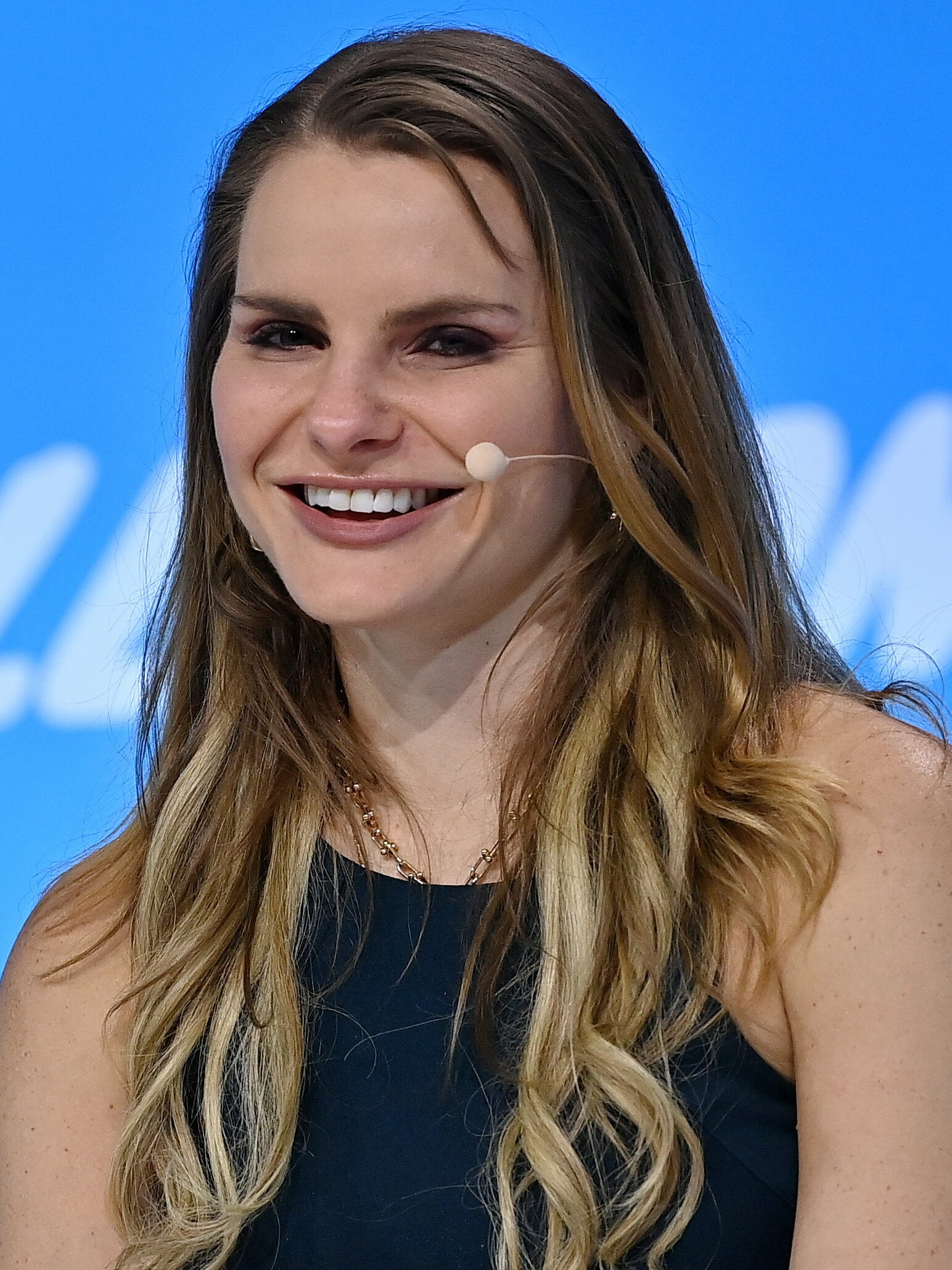
- Romanow in 2023
- Born: 1985 (age 40–41); Calgary, Alberta, Canada
- Occupation: Entrepreneur

Michele Romanow (born 1985) is a Canadian tech entrepreneur, television personality, board director and venture capitalist. She co-founded Clearbanc, a Toronto based provider of revenue sharing solutions to fund new online businesses, and other e-businesses, and made the list of 100 Most Powerful Women in Canada in 2015. She was named as one of the Forbes Top 20 Most Disruptive "Millennials on a Mission" in 2013 and Canadian Innovation Awards’ Angel Investor of the Year in 2018. Romanow joined the cast of CBC’s Dragons' Den in Season 10.

== Early life ==
Romanow was born in Calgary, Alberta and raised in Regina, Saskatchewan. She is of Ukrainian and Slovak descent. She attended Queen's University in Kingston, Ontario and graduated with Civil Engineering and MBA degrees. She was the sole winner of the highest tribute at Queen's, the Agnes Benidickson Tricolour Award, in 2007. Michele is the daughter of Marvin Romanow, the former President & CEO of Nexen.

== Business ==
While at Queen's University in 2006, Romanow co-founded 'Tea Room,' a zero-consumer-waste coffee shop. Post-graduation, she co-founded ventures including Evandale Caviar, Buytopia.ca, and SnapSaves. In 2014, Groupon acquired SnapSaves and relaunched it in the U.S. as Snap by Groupon."

She co-founded Clearbanc in 2015, a venture capital firm, alongside Andrew D'Souza. In June 2017, Ruma Bose, the former president of Chobani Ventures LLC, founded the Canadian Entrepreneurship Initiative with support from Michele Romanow and Entrepreneur in Residence, Richard Branson. According to the Globe and Mail, the not-for-profit is meant to help small-business owners get inexpensive financing, and Romanow promised female entrepreneurs applying through the initiative a 10 percent discount on loans obtained through her financial services platform, clearbanc.com.

Clearbanc rebranded itself to Clearco in 2021, and in June 2022, launched in Germany with a pledge of €500 million to local online businesses.

Romanow is currently a director for Vail Resorts (NYSE: MTN), Freshii (TSX: FRII), Shad, Queen’s School of Business and League of Innovators. She is a former director for Whistler Blackcomb (TSX: WB).

Romanow was also an investor (minority shareholder) of Goldie nightclub in Toronto, which lost its liquor license after violating social distancing orders during the COVID-19 pandemic in Canada. Following the events that led to the suspension of the liquor license Romanow publicly denounced the management of Goldie, stating that she had no involvement in the day-to-day operation, and that she would exercise her option to sell her shares.

== Television ==
Romanow is the youngest cast member of the Canadian reality television series Dragons' Den. She joined the cast on Season 10 in 2015, alongside Joe Fresh founder Joe Mimran and Manjit Minhas of Minhas Breweries after the departure of Arlene Dickinson, David Chilton, and Vikram Vij, and continues to appear in 2018 alongside new Dragons Lane Merrifield and Vincenzo Guzzo.

== Awards ==
Romanow has been recognized with several honors and awards, including:

- Canadian Innovation Award Angel Investor of the Year
  1. 31 Fastest Growing Company on Profit Magazines Profit Hot 50 Ranking
- #21 Fastest Growing Company on the W100 (3,163% 3 year revenue growth)
- EY Entrepreneur of the Year Finalist
- WXN 100 Most Powerful Women
- RBC Canadian Women Entrepreneur Award Finalist
- Toronto Board of Trade Business Excellence Award
- Forbes only Canadian, "Millennial on a Mission"
- Michele Romanow Wins The PWI Next Gen Woman Entrepreneur Of The Year Award 2020-21
