= Michael Wekerle =

Canadian banker and television presenter (born 1963)

- Born: December 17, 1963 (age 62); Toronto, Ontario, Canada
- Occupations: Merchant banker, television personality

Michael Wekerle (born December 17, 1963) is a Canadian merchant banker and television personality, best known for being an investor on the Canadian reality show Dragons' Den for three years, first appearing in the ninth season.

== Business career ==
Born in Toronto, Ontario, Wekerle spent a year studying at York University before dropping out and taking a job as a phone clerk at the Toronto Stock Exchange. He subsequently joined First Marathon, rising to become head trader for the firm. In this capacity, he was one of the key figures in Rogers Communications' takeover of Maclean-Hunter in 1994.

He left First Marathon in 1995 to join Griffiths McBurney and Partners (GMP). In his role with GMP as vice-chairman of trading, he was closely involved with the 1997 initial public offering of Research in Motion. Wekerle left Griffiths McBurney in 2011 by mutual consent, receiving a severance package in return for agreeing to a non-compete clause.

Wekerle launched his own merchant banking firm, Difference Capital, in 2012 to invest in technology startups. His investments through Difference Capital include the film and television studio Thunderbird Films, the data analysis firm Appinions, the medical technology firm BrainScope, the social media management service HootSuite, and the technology firm Vision Critical. In 2014, he announced the launch of a new business incubator in the Waterloo Region that would offer venture capital funding to new tech startups. He subsequently began buying high-tech commercial buildings in Waterloo, a number of which had previously been owned by BlackBerry.

== Dragons' Den ==
In March 2014, he was announced as one of two new dragons, along with restaurateur Vikram Vij, who would join Dragons' Den in its ninth season following the departures of Kevin O'Leary and Bruce Croxon. In one of his first dragon deals on the series, he invested in Covergalls, a new line of workwear designed for women in industrial jobs. He left the show after the 12th season.

== Other activities ==
He is a partner in the Canadian franchise expansion plans of Mark Wahlberg's Wahlburgers chain of restaurants. Wekerle is a former owner of El Mocambo, a live music venue in Toronto, which he purchased in 2014.

In 2013, he was a participant in the Humour Me Comedy Classic, a charitable event in which business executives train to perform stand-up comedy routines as a fundraiser for Toronto's Hospital for Sick Children. He is also a sponsor of "Wekfest" and "Wektoberfest", annual charitable fundraising music festivals in Waterloo.

== In other media ==
Wekerle made a special guest appearance in Trailer Park Boys: The Animated Series.

== Personal life ==
He was married twice and his first marriage ended in divorce. In 2024, he married his long time sweetheart, Yasmin Castellon. In 2010, Wekerle experienced a bout of depression after his second wife, Lea-Anne, died of a heart attack. His behaviour became increasingly erratic over the next several months, which eventually prompted his departure from GMP Capital. At a charity fundraising roast for Newcap Broadcasting CEO Rob Steele that summer, he drunkenly interrupted host Rex Murphy, and in October, he arrived drunk at a hotel in Little Rock, Arkansas, and allegedly engaged in rowdy and disorderly behaviour. A valet with the hotel filed a lawsuit against Wekerle in 2013, alleging that he had suffered a permanent injury as a result of Wekerle's behaviour.

He lives part-time in Caledon, Ontario, at the Heath Putnam Farm, which was owned by Norman Jewison (the Chancellor of Victoria College).

Wekerle's Porsche 918 Spyder burst into flames at an Esso gas station on 28 September 2014 in Caledon while he was filling up his gas tank. Some gas overfilled, which caused the explosion. Nobody was hurt during the occurrence.
