= Pizza cake =

Canadian multiple-layer pizza

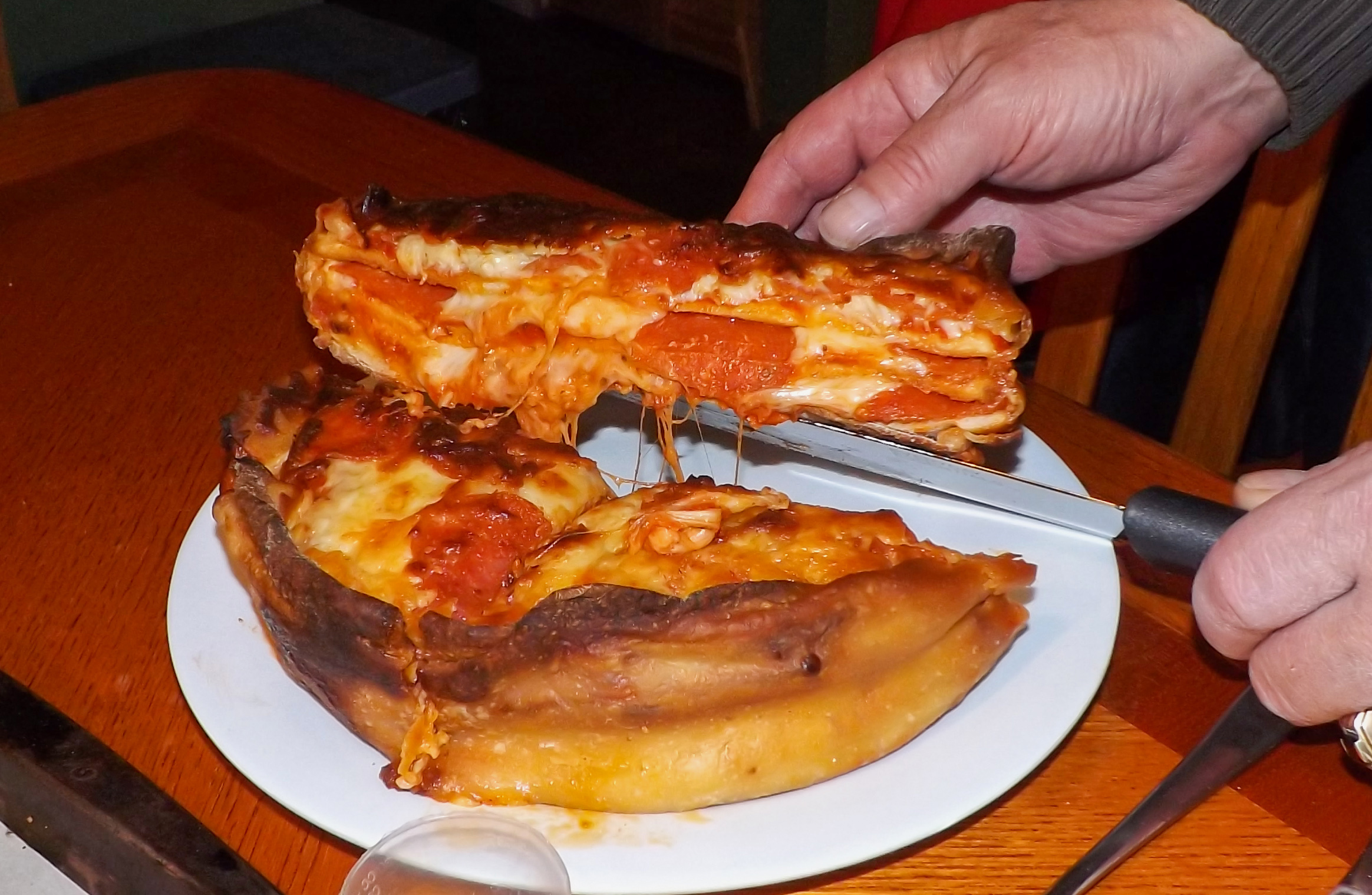
- A homemade pizza cake being sliced
- Type: Pizza
- Place of origin: Canada

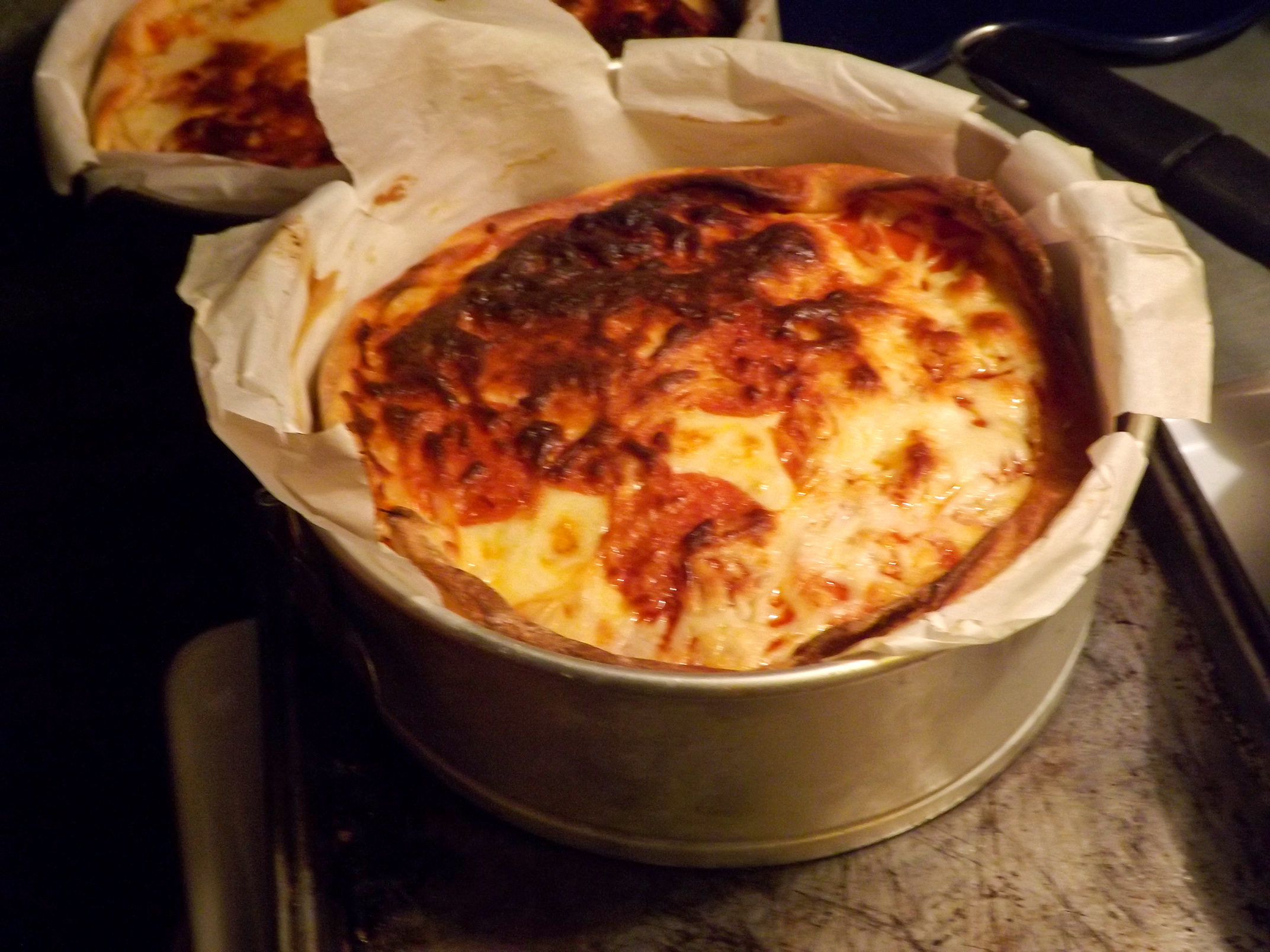
Pizza cake in the pan

Pizza cake is a Canadian multiple-layer pizza baked in a pot or cake pan. First invented by Boston Pizza, recipes were posted online as early as April 2014, becoming a viral phenomenon when the Pillsbury Company posted an example in September 2014. Reviews have been mixed, with praise aimed at its taste and criticism levelled at its complexity and unhealthiness.

== History ==
In April 2014, the Canadian-based chain Boston Pizza included the pizza cake as part of its Pizza Game Changers promotion, which featured numerous "outlandish" pizza-related products. The recipe quickly became the promotion's most popular, receiving 15,000 votes by 21 April – more than five times as many as its nearest competitor, the pizza mint. It held this position until the promotion closed. The company advertised the concoction as "great for birthdays, bar mitzvahs, weddings, and even lonely nights watching infomercials".

Inspired by the Boston Pizza promotion, later in April a recipe for pizza cake was posted to the So Good Blog; one Reddit user who tried the recipe described it as "heavenly", though with a strong "food hangover". In September 2014, a recipe for pizza cake by Shawn Syphus was posted by the Pillsbury Company. It soon circulated widely on the internet, becoming viral; the company was sometimes mistakenly attributed with originating the recipe.

== Preparation ==
The So Good Blog recipe calls for regular pizza dough, rolled into a layer 1/5 inch (5 mm) thick, out of which six round pieces 6 1/3 inches (16 cm) in diameter are cut. These rounds are cooked in a preheated oven for 15 minutes, then allowed to cool. Meanwhile, baking paper is spread in a pot, the sides of which are then lined with a 1/5-inch (5 mm) thick layer of dough. When this is complete and the rounds are cooled, a round is placed at the bottom, then covered in pizza ingredients (including sauce, pepperoni, and cheese); this step is repeated until the pot is filled. After excess dough is trimmed off and the edges are tucked in, the pizza cake is baked for 45 minutes.

The Pillsbury recipe which went viral in September 2014 had a similar, though smaller, recipe which called for less cooking time. The recipe recommended a pan with tall sides (square or round), and called for three layers of dough and a total of 28–33 minutes of cooking time (8 for the rounds and 20–25 for the finished pizza).

The Daily Mirror said that a six-layer Boston Pizza pizza cake has a total of 5,000 calories.

== Reception ==
Peter Sagal of NPR found the recipe was more complicated than it appeared, writing "It's not exactly (how much you like pizza) × (number of layers)", and that the pizza cake lost the crispiness of the crust. He concluded that the recipe was fun to make, and the "obscene amount of cheese" being eaten makes one forget issues with the crust. Rosanne Salvatore, writing for the online magazine Bustle, considered the cake worth recommending despite the amount of work and expense required; she concluded "I created a miracle [the pizza cake] with my bare hands".

April Blake, writing in the Cleveland Free Times, had a more negative view of the recipe. She considered it difficult to prepare, lacking crispiness in the crust, and more unhealthy than a regular pizza.

== See also ==
- Pizza in Canada
