= The Wealthy Barber =

Book franchise by David Chilton

The Wealthy Barber: The Common Sense Guide to Successful Financial Planning
- Author: David Chilton
- Genre: Personal finance
- Publisher: Stoddart Publishing Co. Limited
- Publication date: 1989
- Publication place: Canada
- Media type: Print (Paperback)
- Pages: 197 (Paperback)
- ISBN: 0-7737-5318-4 (Paperback)
- OCLC: 19973656
- Followed by: The Wealthy Barber Returns

The Wealthy Barber is a financial planning media franchise by Canadian author David Chilton. The first book in the series, first published in 1989 (full title: The Wealthy Barber: The Common Sense Guide to Successful Financial Planning) is in the business fable genre, using the story of fictional characters to convey financial advice.

A sequel without the fable structure, The Wealthy Barber Returns, was published in 2011. A rewritten version of the original narrative, with the full title The Wealthy Barber: The Fully Updated All-Time Canadian Classic, followed in 2025. TV specials and a podcast based on the books have also been produced.

== Plot summary ==
The book is structured around a story of three people in their late 20s visiting Roy, the title character, for lessons in financial planning. Each chapter of the book describes a different visit and a different element of financial planning. Each month along with their lessons the three students are required to start carrying out the actions prescribed by Roy. In addition to these individuals, Roy also shares his financial knowledge with the customers of his barber shop.

The story (Canadian editions) is set primarily in Sarnia, Ontario, where Roy has been operating a barber shop for several decades. As a young man, Roy had planned to become a lawyer, but those plans were derailed. He ended up taking over his father's barber shop. Worried about money, Roy visited Mr. White, one of the town's wealthiest men, and asked for advice on financial planning. This advice paved the way for Roy's accumulating wealth.

The basis of the book is Roy's advice to "save 10 per cent of all that you earn and invest it for long-term growth." In that, it draws from the advice first set forth in The Richest Man in Babylon. Subsequent chapters discuss wills and life insurance, RRSPs, buying a home, income tax and saving and spending.

Roy (and thus Chilton) is not as harshly anti-debt as some other authors, like Dave Ramsey. However Roy does advise that extra money should go to pay off debt, and that credit cards are "anathema" to well-run personal finances. Roy does believe that if you are investing 10% and maxing out your RRSP, day-to-day spending doesn't matter too much to your overall financial picture.

A U.S. version with discussion of topics such as IRAs was also released; the third edition was published in 1997.

The updated 2025 edition of the Canadian version adds discussion of additional account types and products introduced in Canada since 1989, including TFSAs, FHSAs, and ETFs, as well as the impacts of social media influencers on financial behaviour.

== Main characters ==
Dave (in the original book; Matt in the 2025 revision) is an expectant father who realizes he is not financially prepared. His worries lead him to seek financial advice from the local barber.

Cathy (replaced by Jess in the 2025 edition) is already rich but relates to the audience members who don't necessarily understand the market and how it works, thus do not generally invest their earnings.

Roy, the barber, poses as the financial expert who has become wealthy simply by being wary of his money and intelligently spending, saving and investing it.

== The Wealthy Barber Returns ==
In the sequel, The Wealthy Barber Returns (full title The Wealthy Barber Returns: Significantly Older and Marginally Wiser, David Chilton Offers His Unique Perspectives on the World of Money), Chilton dispenses with the device of characters, representing his advice this time in his own voice. The book is divided into 54 short chapters, dispensing advice on miscellaneous topics in savings and investments, with a particular focus on avoiding reckless spending behaviour.

The main idea is to accept that one cannot have everything and should avoid impulse buying by removing temptations which trigger overspending. This may be achieved through analysis and modification of one's personal behaviour (if you overspend on clothes, stop going to the mall and reading fashion blogs), and avoiding bad debt in the form of credit cards which carry very high interest charges, though some debt may be necessary (mortgages for example). Ultimately, wealth depends more on savings than income. Chilton's bottom line, which is emphasized in his first book as well, is that we should all save 10-15% of our earnings.

== Other media ==
Chilton hosted a series of U.S. public television pledge drive specials discussing the contents of The Wealthy Barber in the early 1990s.

In September 2024, Chilton launched The Wealthy Barber Podcast, in which he discusses personal finance topics with various guests.

== Release details ==
- The Wealthy Barber: The Common Sense Guide to Successful Financial Planning. Toronto: Stoddart. 1989. ISBN 0-7737-5318-4.
- The Wealthy Barber Returns: Significantly Older and Marginally Wiser, David Chilton Offers His Unique Perspectives on the World of Money. Waterloo, ON: Financial Awareness Corporation. 2011. ISBN 978-0-9683-9474-8.
- The Wealthy Barber: The Fully Updated All-Time Canadian Classic. Kitchener: Financial Awareness Corporation. 2025. ISBN 978-1-0689750-0-4.

== See also ==
- Does Coffee Cause Cancer?, a food science book written in a similar style.
