= Balzac's Coffee Roasters =

Canadian coffee company

- Industry: Restaurants
- Genre: Coffee house
- Services: Coffee
- Website: balzacs.com

Balzac's Coffee is a Canadian coffee company with sixteen retail locations across Southwestern Ontario and the GTA, including Toronto Niagara, Kitchener, Stratford, Guelph, and Kingston. The first Balzac’s café was opened in Stratford, Ontario, in 1996, by entrepreneur Diana Olsen. Named after the famous French novelist and famed coffee drinker Honoré de Balzac, the cafes serve conventional and fair trade blends, as well as espressos, hot chocolate and a variety of cold beverages. Each Balzac's Coffee location has commissioned a café poster unique to the community it serves.

Balzac's was featured in the sixth season of Dragon's Den; two of the venture capitalists on the show bought into the company. In 2016, the company started a new business, selling coffee beans in grocery stores across Canada, including Loblaws, Sobeys and Whole Foods.

In 2024 Balzac's Anniversary Blend coffee brand won an award from Western Grocer for Best New Product in the Whole Bean Coffee category The company is owned by District Ventures Capital, a private equity firm led by Arlene Dickinson.
