= Manjit Minhas =

Canadian entrepreneur and television personality

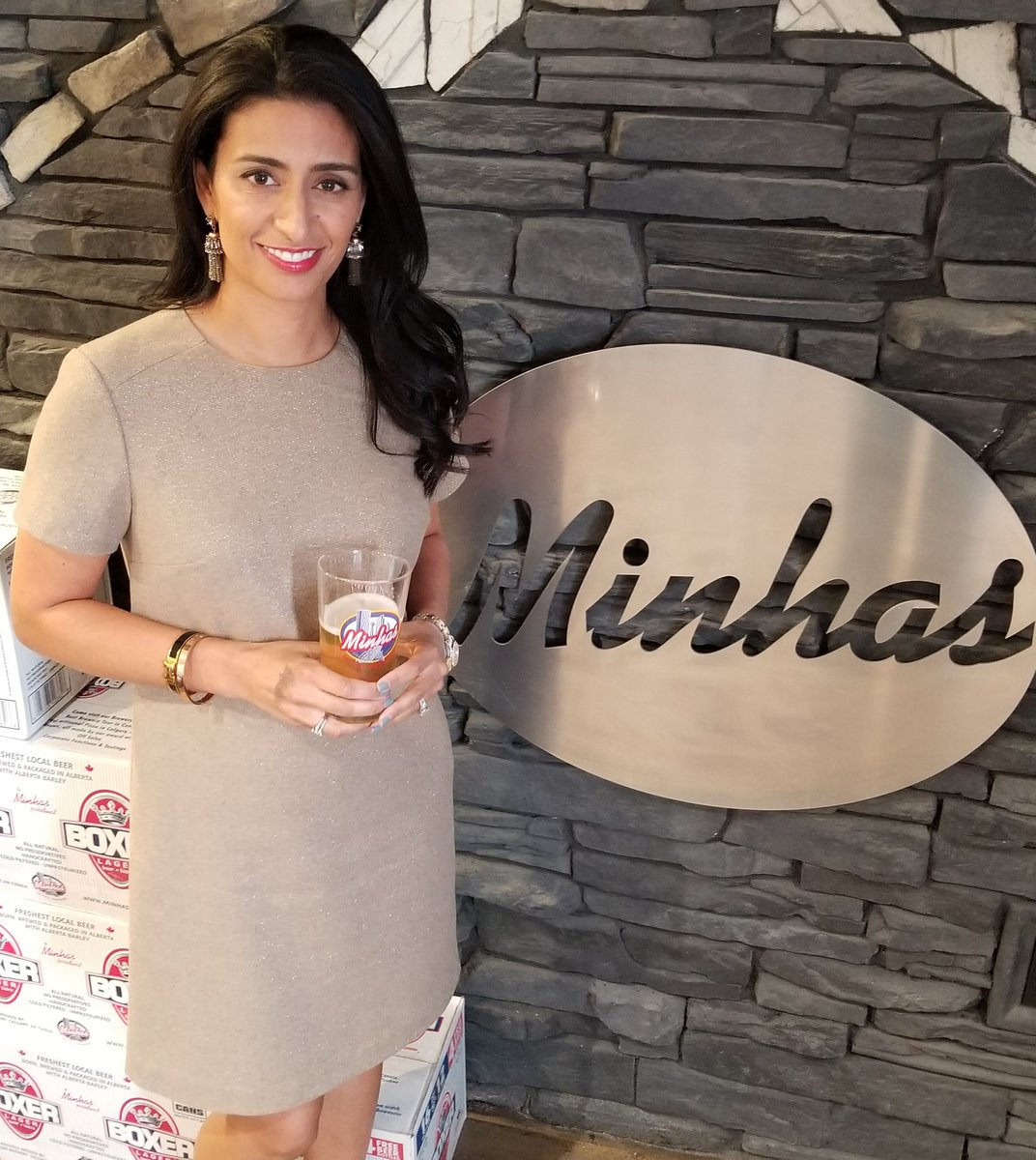
Manjit Minhas: Founder of Minhas Micro Brewery

Manjit Minhas is a Canadian entrepreneur, television personality and angel investor. She is co-owner of Minhas Breweries & Distillery, manufacturer of beer brands such as Mountain Crest Classic Lager, Boxer Lager, Lazy Mutt Ale and Huber Bock. She specializes in marketing with interests in branding and sales. Minhas was announced as one of the new dragons on Season 10 of the Canadian reality television series Dragons' Den in 2015 for its tenth season. According to the Dragons Den website she has "been recognized for several business industry awards such as PROFIT magazine's "Top Growth Entrepreneur", Top 100 Women Entrepreneurs in Canada, Canada's Top 40 under 40, Chatelaine Magazine's "Top Entrepreneur Woman of The Year 2011", Ernst and Young's Entrepreneur of The Year Prairie Region and The Sikh Centennial Foundation Award 2015." Minhas's philanthropic causes include The United Way, which she co-chaired in 2017 and an engineering school for girls in India. Minhas joined the ATB Financial Board of Directors in 2017 and is on both the Governance and Conduct Review, and the Human Resources Committees. She joined the Calgary Airport Authority Board of Directors in 2020.

Minhas was named a recipient of the 1st Alumni of Influence Award in 2017 by JA Southern Alberta at the Calgary Business Hall of Fame induction ceremony. Other notable Canadian JA alumni have included marketing executive Jennifer Wilnechenko (British Columbia), executive director of The DMZ at Ryerson University Abdullah Snobar (Ontario), and young philanthropist Ben Sabic (Manitoba). She is also a recipient for the 2018 Canada's 40 under 40 award.. In June 2026, Minhas was honoured with a Women Making History in Alberta Award.

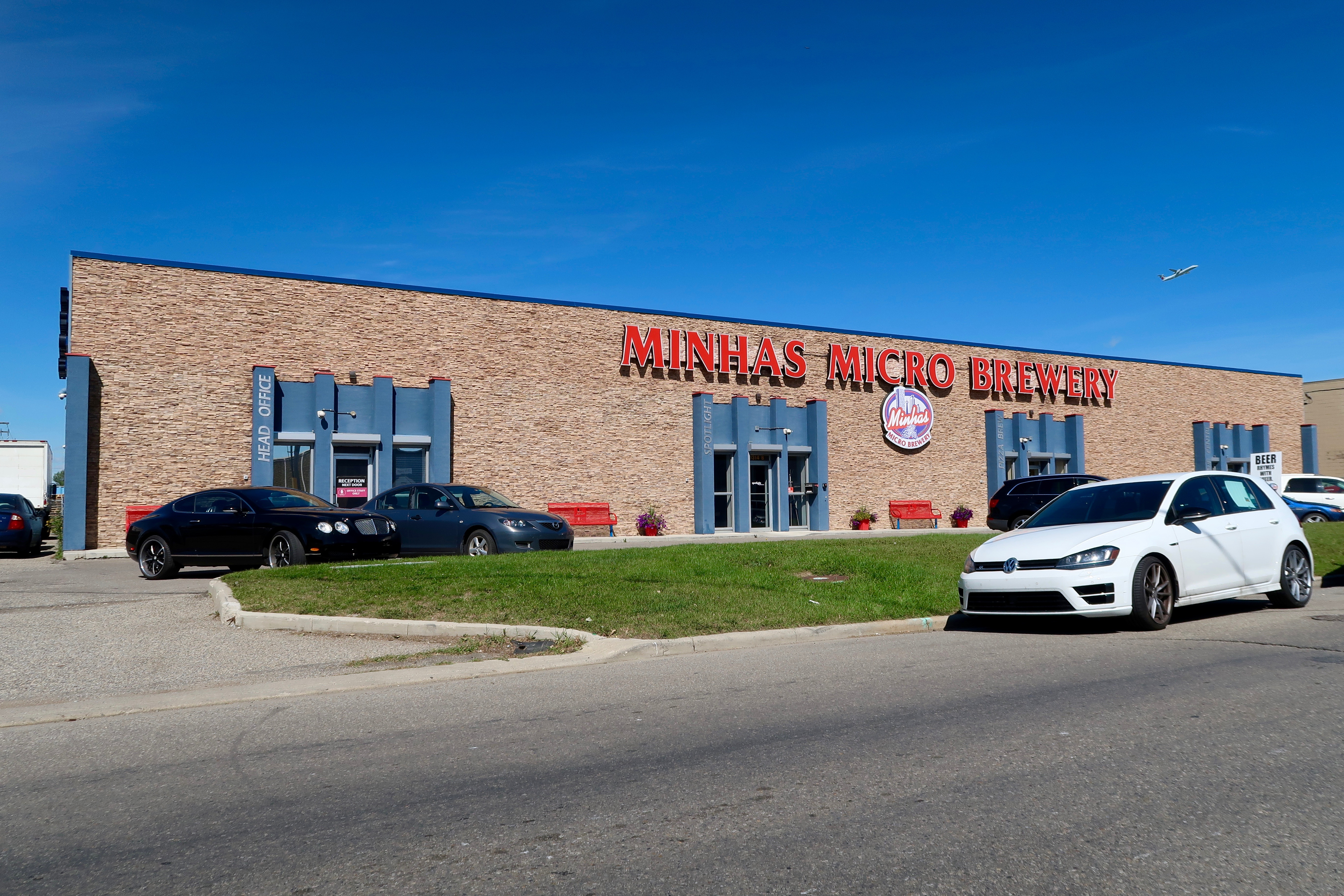
Minhas Headquarters in Calgary, Alberta

== Personal life ==
Minhas was enrolled in engineering programs at the University of Calgary and University of Regina, but after a few years, her focus changed to entrepreneurship and she decided to concentrate on creating and marketing businesses. In the early 2000s Minhas designed her own marketing brand and commenced creating a diverse line of beers, lagers, spirits and various supplementary alcohol products. The Minhas Brand has grown into a brand that has recognition with alcohol enthusiasts due to Minhas's marketing strategies. Minhas resides with her husband Harvey Shergill and two daughters in Calgary, Alberta. Minhas's family is Sikh Rajput.

== Business ==
Minhas and her brother Ravinder entered the alcohol industry in 1999, while both siblings were students at the University of Calgary. Their first endeavour was importing private label spirits for a chain of liquor stores owned by their parents. The siblings began importing beer in 2002.

In 2006, the Mountain Crest Brewing Company purchased the second-oldest brewery in the United States, the Joseph Huber Brewing Company, along with rights to the Huber and Rhinelander beer brands and Blumers soda brand. The Monroe brewery was renamed Minhas Craft Brewery. As of 2020, Minhas Craft Brewery is the 18th largest craft brewery in the United States and 28th overall.

In addition to producing such brands as Boxer Lager, Lazy Mutt Ale and Huber Bock, the Minhas Craft Brewery has also produced for other brewers and produces private label beers and spirits for retailers such as Costco, Trader Joe's, Lidl, Tesco and Walgreens.

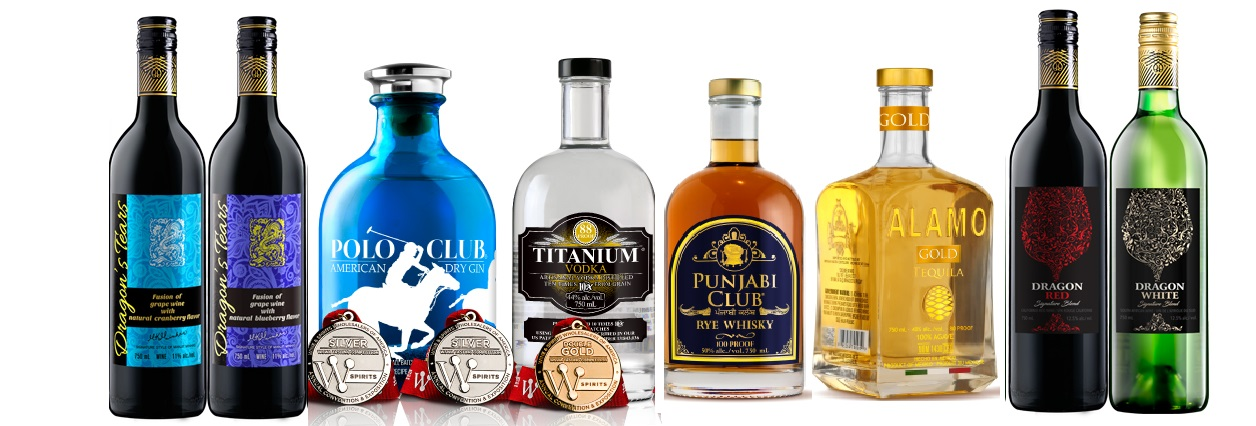
Products from Minhas Micro Brewery line. Dragon's Tears Fruit Wine, Polo Club Gin, Titanium Vodka, Punjabi Club, Alamo Gold Tequila and Dragon's Tears Wine.

A second brewery, the Minhas Micro Brewery, opened in Calgary, Alberta in June 2012.

In addition to the Minhas Craft Brewery, is the Minhas Distillery, Minhas Winery and Minhas Kitchen are located in Monroe, Wisconsin.

Combined, the Minhas Breweries & Distillery is a group of companies with a reported revenue of $155 million in 2014.

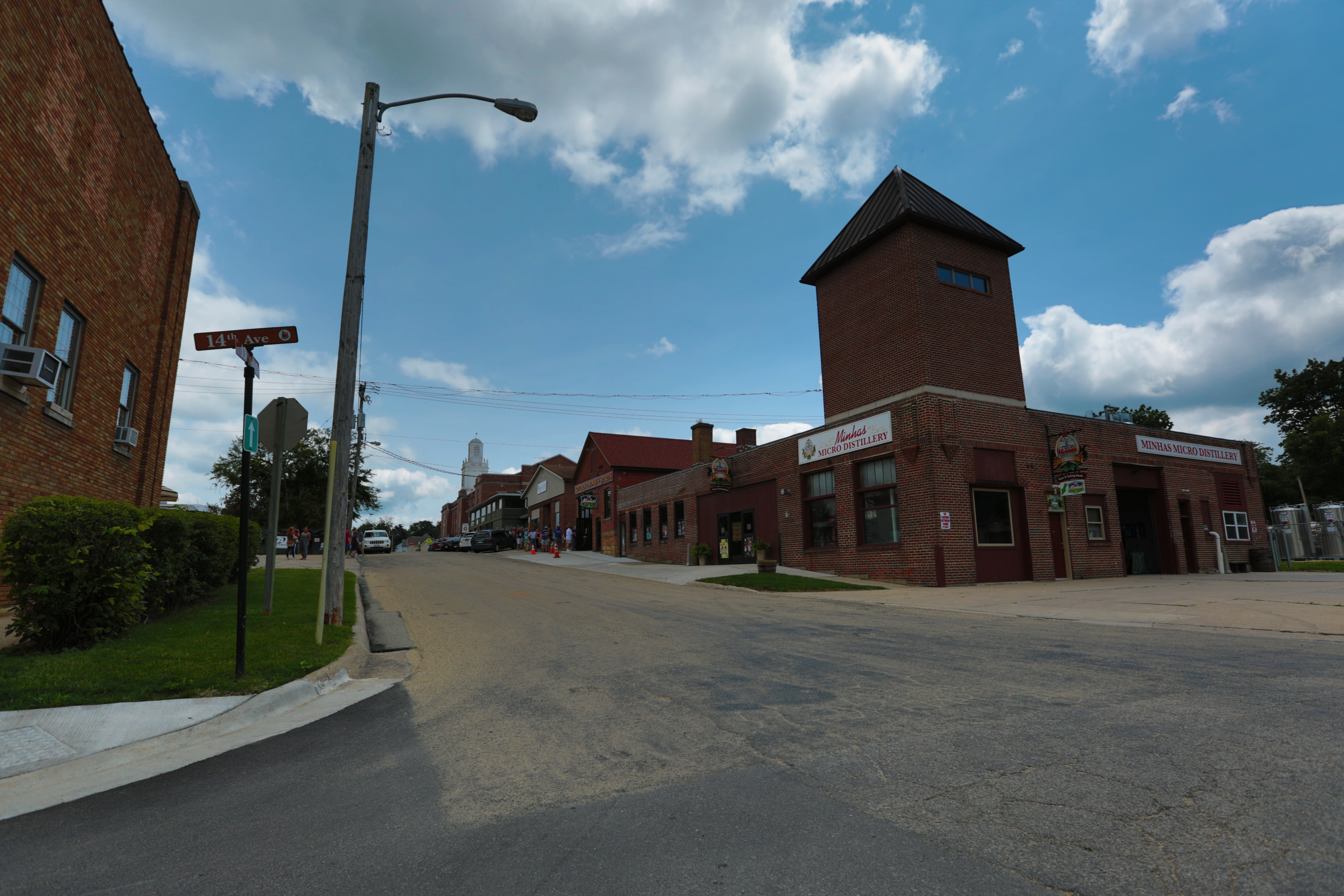
Minhas Distillery located in Monroe, WI

In March 2022, Minhas was appointed as Senior Advisor to Decibel Cannabis Company's Board of Directors. Minhas was subsequently nominated on November 21, 2022 to join Decibel's board.

== Media appearances ==
Since starting her brewery Minhas's media presence has grown. Becoming a dragon on Dragon's Den has allowed her to become a well-known media figure. She is an active speaker at many keynote events across Canada and United States and is represented by The Lavin Agency. Minhas was a celebrity judge for the 2017 Calgary Stampede Annual Parade.

== Lawsuit ==
Molson Brewery sued Mountain Crest Brewing in 2002 over similarities between the Minhas' flagship product and the Molson-owned product Old Style Pilsner. The matter was settled out of court.

Minhas claims competitors were behind an Ontario Provincial Police investigation that hindered her company's entry into the Ontario beer market in 2005. The investigation was eventually dropped and Boxer Lager was listed in Ontario's Beer Store chain in 2009.
