= Brian Scudamore =

American–born, Canadian entrepreneur

- Born: March 16, 1970 (age 56); San Francisco
- Known for: Entrepreneurship 1-800-GOT-JUNK?
- Notable work: WTF?! Willing To Fail BYOB: Build Your Own Business, Be Your Own Boss Founder Stories Podcast
- Website: brianscudamore.com

Brian Scudamore (b. March 16, 1970) is an American–born, Canadian entrepreneur. He is the founder and CEO of O2E Brands, the parent company of 1-800-GOT-JUNK?, WOW 1 DAY PAINTING, and Shack Shine. He is a regular contributor to Forbes, writing about small business ownership, franchising, and building corporate culture. His first book, WTF?! (Willing to Fail): How Failure Can Be Your Key to Success, was published in 2018 and his second book, BYOB: Build Your Own Business, Be Your Own Boss, was published in 2022.

On April 4, 2024, CBC announced he will join as an investor on Season 19 of Dragon's Den.

== Early life and education ==
Brian Scudamore was born on March 16, 1970, in San Francisco. In high school, Scudamore struggled with reading and had trouble completing an eighth math class. When he failed, he decided to drop out. Despite not finishing school, he persuaded Concordia University's admissions department that he would be a good fit for their business program, and they accepted him. Two years later, Scudamore left Concordia to attend the University of British Columbia to be geographically closer to his business. His father, Charles Scudamore, a liver transplant surgeon, was disappointed when Scudamore dropped out of university in 1993 to focus on rubbish full time.

== Books ==
Scudamore's first book, WTF?! (Willing to Fail): How Failure Can Be Your Key to Success, was published in 2018. It traces his journey through entrepreneurship, telling stories from his almost 30 years in business. His second book, BYOB: Build Your Own Business, Be Your Own Boss, was published in 2022 and is a Wall Street Journal, USA Today and Amazon Bestseller. It shares two clear paths for starting a business, and is full of lessons learned from inspiring entrepreneurs, and tips and tricks for crafting your own vision for the future (and advice on how to achieve it).

== Podcast ==
In October 2019, Scudamore launched Founders Stories, a podcast about ordinary people starting their own exceptional businesses. In the podcast, Scudamore interviews a different franchise owner each week about their path to business ownership, from their decisions to start their business, to the celebrations and lessons that follow.

== Career ==
=== The Rubbish Boys ===
In 1989, Scudamore was waiting in line at a McDonald's drive-thru when he noticed a pickup truck advertising a junk removal service. Scudamore, thinking he could haul junk to pay for college, invested $700 from savings to purchase a truck and started his own business. Calling it The Rubbish Boys (tagline: "We'll stash your trash in a flash!" ), he would go door-to-door and patrol alleyways for junk that the city wouldn't take. The business took off faster than he expected, often requiring Scudamore to skip class to take calls. Because he felt he was learning more about business through experience than school, he dropped out to focus on his company.

Although Rubbish Boys achieved $1 Million in revenue in 1997, Scudamore realized his team of employees did not share his vision for the company, so he laid-off his entire staff roster. He then adopted a new motto that states "It's All About People" and hired staff who shared his goals and vision for the company.

=== 1-800-GOT-JUNK? ===
Scudamore decided that if he was going to professionalize a fragmented industry, the company needed a name that was catchy and easy to remember. He settled on '1-800-GOT-JUNK?', but the number was already owned by the Idaho Transportation Department. Scudamore persisted, and they eventually released it to him at no cost. Since 1998, the organization has experienced considerable growth. It currently services over 150 locations in Canada, the United States, and Australia.

=== Franchising and Growth ===
Scudamore wanted to see his business grow, but declined to seek or accept offers of external funding so he could continue to move forward with his vision. Even after being advised that his company and industry could not be franchised, he decided to test the markets by launching operations in Victoria, British Columbia, and Seattle. After seeing success, Scudamore entrusted his friend Paul Guy to open the first 1-800-GOT-JUNK? franchise in Toronto in 1999, which is still the largest and most profitable location today. The first US franchise opened in Portland, Oregon, the following year, opening the door to 100 franchises throughout North America by 2004, and expanding into Australia in 2005.

Brian Scudamore was quoted on 10 million Starbucks cups as part of their 'As I See It' program.

=== WOW 1 DAY PAINTING ===
When Scudamore was looking for a company to paint his house, he saw an ad from a company claiming to paint an entire house in a day. Skeptical but curious, Scudamore decided to hire One Day Painting. He was so surprised and pleased with the results that he decided to approach the previous owner about franchising the company. Scudamore bought the majority stake and set out to apply the same principles and infrastructure of 1-800-GOT-JUNK? to another customer-focused, service-based business, which became WOW 1 DAY PAINTING (he'd initially renamed it 1-888-WOW1DAY! Painting). Scudamore launched the first franchise in Vancouver in late 2010, followed by the first US franchise in Seattle. Since then, the franchise has grown to service over 60 locations in Canada and the United States.

=== Shack Shine ===
The latest home-service brand from Scudamore is Shack Shine, launched in January 2016. Shack Shine is a franchised company that provides gutter-cleaning, power washing, christmas light installations and window washing. Shack Shine services 60 locations in Canada and the United States.

== Entrepreneurship ==
Near the end of 2015, Scudamore revealed a new term for the model of franchising used by O2E Brands - "entrypreneurship", defined as an entry point for aspiring entrepreneurs who don't have access to the expertise or capital to launch a business venture.

On April 4, 2024, CBC announced Brian would be on season nineteen of Dragons' Den. The show's Executive Producer states, "His presence enriches the Den’s dynamic, offering invaluable expertise and inspiration to Canadian audiences and aspiring entrepreneurs.”

== Recognition ==
In 2004, Scudamore was inducted into the Young Presidents' Organization (YPO) and served as a board member for the Young Entrepreneurs' Organization (YEO). Three years later, the International Franchise Association named Brian Scudamore 'Entrepreneur of the Year'. He became a CEO Hall of Fame Lifetime Achievement Inductee with the Collegiate Entrepreneurs' Organization in 2012. Other accolades include Fortune Small Business' Best Bosses Award, Best Leader on Facebook from The CSuite Awards, The Globe and Mail's Top 40 under 40, three 'Best Company To Work For' awards, and an Entrepreneur of the Year award for Business to Consumer services in British Columbia.
