= Does Coffee Cause Cancer? =

2023 book about health

Does Coffee Cause Cancer? And 8 More Myths about the Food We Eat
- Author: Christopher Labos
- Language: English
- Subject: Medicine and health
- Genre: Non fiction
- Publisher: ECW Press
- Publication date: 31 October 2023
- Publication place: Canada
- Pages: 304
- ISBN: 9781770417229
- Website: ECW Press

Does Coffee Cause Cancer? And 8 More Myths about the Food We Eat is a 2023 book by Canadian cardiologist Christopher Labos. It presents information about nine health myths through a series of conversations between fictional characters.

The book uses a fictional story to present and dispel misconceptions around nine topics related to food science.

The book aims to explain why food science is complex and to debunk some of the food myths that permeate society, with an evolving relationship as a narrative. Labos' publisher suggested he emulate the fictional style of The Wealthy Barber. He ended up developing a nine-chapter story arc featuring conversations between fictional characters that mirror exchanges that Labos had with acquaintances in real life.

The chapters tell a continuous romantic story involving conversations between the protagonist and other people with whom he discussed various health topics. Mathematical and methodological discussions are appended to the text, on topics such as demographic selection and p-hacking.

Labos is hoping to write a sequel, for which he wrote a sample chapter.

== Topics ==
The book covers nine topics presented as myths.

1. Vitamin C fights the common cold.
2. Hot dogs are as bad as cigarettes.
3. Some salt is good for you.
4. Coffee causes cancer
5. Red wine's good for you heart
6. Chocolate is health food
7. Breakfast's the most important meal of the day
8. Caffeine can trigger heart attacks
9. Vitamin D is the cure for everything

== Reception ==
The reviews published in local and specialized publications were positive, noting the narrative structure and the informational content.

In The Suburban, Mike Cohen calls it a "fascinating, refreshingly clarifying new book".

On AIPT Science, Adrienne Hill highlights the efforts made by Labos to make the science accessible: "The explanations are straightforward, using analogies to help understand counterintuitive reasoning and conclusions, with a good dose of humor intermixed."

In the Miramichi Reader, Lisa Timpf focused on the readability of the text for a wide audience: "Snappy dialogue, humorous misunderstandings, and some mild teasing about statistics are some of the avenues Labos uses to deliver a laugh."
