= Laurence Lewin =

Canadian entrepreneur

- Born: 20 May 1944; United Kingdom
- Died: 12 November 2008 (aged 64); Montreal, Quebec, Canada
- Other names: Laurie
- Known for: Co-founded a lingerie firm, appeared on Dragons' Den (Canadian TV series)

Laurence Lewin (20 May 1944 – 12 November 2008) was an English-born Canadian accountant, computer programmer and entrepreneur, who was one of the co-founders of lingerie firm La Senza.

Lewin was working at clothing retailer Suzy Shier, in 1990, when he co-founded La Senza, a lingerie firm that was eventually licensed to 700 retail outlets around the world.

On 6 April 2006, La Senza issued a press release, quoting Lewin, to try to clarify its position as to whether one of its brassieres infringed a Victoria's Secret design.

The firm was acquired by lingerie giant Victoria's Secret, on 12 October 2006, for $710 million CAD.

Lewin immigrated from the United Kingdom to Canada, and settled in Montreal in the 1970s.

Lewin appeared on the first two seasons of the Canadian Dragons' Den TV series.
