= Minhas Craft Brewery =

American craft beer brewery

- Type: Craft brewery – alcoholic beverages
- Location: Monroe, Wisconsin, US
- Opened: 1845 (formerly Joseph Huber Brewing Company)
- Other products: Soda, Alcopops, Liquor
- Owner: Ravinder Minhas & Manjit Minhas
- Parent: Minhas Brewery
- Divisions: Divisions of Minhas Brewery: Minhas Distillery – Monroe, Wisconsin, USA; Minhas Craft Brewery – Monroe, Wisconsin, USA; Minhas Micro Brewery – Calgary, Alberta, Canada; Pizza Brew Restaurant – Calgary, Alberta, Canada
- Distribution: Across Canada, the U.S. and 16 other countries worldwide (including: Brazil, Chile, China, Colombia, Costa Rica, England, Finland, Guam, Japan, Malaysia, Mexico, Norway, Panama and Trinidad)
- Tasting: Tours & tastings offered daily
- Website: minhasbrewery.com

Active beers
Premium Brews
Boxer Lager
Boxer Gluten Free
Boxer Ice
Boxer Light
Boxer Bubbly
Boxer Watermelon
Boxer Apple Ale
Boxer Blond
Boxer Moscow Mule
Boxer Hard Root Beer
Mountain Crest Classic Lager
Clear Creek Ice
Huber Premium
Craft Brews
Lazy Mutt Chocolate Stout
Lazy Mutt Double IPA
Lazy Mutt So Cal IPA
Lazy Mutt Traditional IPA
Lazy Mutt Strong Ale
Lazy Mutt Belgian White Ale
Lazy Mutt Alberta Wheat Ale
Lazy Mutt Authentic IPA
Lazy Mutt Alberta Brown Ale
Lazy Mutt Alberta Red Ale
Lazy Mutt Farmhouse Ale
Huber Bock
1845 Pils
Minhas Swiss Style Amber
Axehead Malt Liquor
Name	Type

Seasonal beers
Lazy Mutt Seasonal Shandy
Lazy Mutt Seasonal Oktoberfest
Lazy Mutt Seasonal Winter Bock
Lazy Mutt Seasonal Wet Hopped IPA
Lazy Mutt Seasonal Pumpkin Ale
Lazy Mutt Seasonal Hazelnut Dark
Lazy Mutt Seasonal Hefeweizen
Lazy Mutt Seasonal Chocolate Cherry
Lazy Mutt Seasonal Alcoholic Ginger Beer
Name	Type

Other beers
Bad Hare Autumn Ale
Bad Hare Blonde Ale
Bad Hare Rum Ale
Bad Hare Scotch Ale
Bad Hare Bock Light
Bad Hare Oatmeal Stout
Bad Hare Espresso Stout
Bad Hare White Chocolate
Uptown Girl Premium Light
Uptown Girl Cherry Belgian Red
Uptown Girl Strawberry Blond
Kirkland Kirkland Signature Light
Simpler Times Pilsner
Simpler Times Lager
Boatswain H.L.V. Ale
Imperial Jack
Name	Type

The Minhas Craft Brewery is located in Monroe, Wisconsin, owned by brother and sister, Ravinder and Manjit Minhas. It is the Midwest's oldest brewery and the second oldest in the United States. It survived the Great Depression, Prohibition and a fire. It is currently the 18th largest craft brewery in America.

== Capabilities ==
The Minhas Craft Brewery produces a variety of over 233 beers, spirits, liqueurs and wines. Their products are shipped across Canada, the U.S. and 16 other countries worldwide (including: Brazil, Chile, China, Colombia, Costa Rica, England, Finland, Guam, Japan, Malaysia, Mexico, Norway, Panama and Trinidad). The facility offers daily brewery tours and beer tastings. It also houses the largest brewery memorabilia museum in the United States.

This brewery is one of the alcohol manufacturing companies owned by the Minhas siblings – collectively designated as Minhas Brewery- that generate more than $155 million in revenue annually. The other companies under the Minhas Brewery umbrella are: Minhas Micro Brewery in Calgary, Alberta, Canada; Minhas Distillery in Monroe, WI; and Pizza Brew Restaurant in Calgary, Alberta, Canada.

== History ==
Minhas Brewery was founded in 2002 in Calgary, Alberta, Canada, by siblings Manjit Minhas and Ravinder Minhas. Originally incorporated as the Mountain Crest Brewing Company, the enterprise began by producing affordable beer for the Western Canadian market under the slogan "Damn Good Beer."

In 2003, the company gained national attention when it challenged major beer suppliers in Alberta over pricing practices, contributing to the liberalization of beer retailing rules in the province. Within a few years, Mountain Crest became one of the largest independent breweries in Western Canada.

In 2006, the Minhas family acquired the historic Joseph Huber Brewing Company in Monroe, Wisconsin, the second-oldest brewery in the United States, originally founded in 1845. The acquisition marked the company’s expansion into the American market and the rebranding of the facility as the Minhas Craft Brewery. The Monroe site became the main production centre for both Canadian and U.S. distribution.

Following this expansion, the company diversified under the Minhas Beverage Group, encompassing the Minhas Micro Brewery, Minhas Distillery, and Minhas Winery in Wisconsin, as well as the Minhas Brewery in Calgary. Its portfolio includes beers, spirits, wines, and ready-to-drink beverages distributed across North America and internationally.

Manjit Minhas later gained national prominence as a venture capitalist and television personality on the CBC show Dragons’ Den.

As of the 2020s, Minhas Brewery remains one of the largest privately owned breweries in Canada and among the few with significant operations in both Canada and the United States.

== Beers ==
Minhas Craft Brewery packages beer, soda and alcopops in 236 mL, 355 mL, 473 mL and 710 mL aluminum cans; 207 mL, 330 mL, 650 mL and 1,183 mL glass bottles, and a variety of polyethylene terephthalate bottles.

Among the most well-known beers and malt beverages produced at Minhas Craft Brewery are:

=== Boxer ===
Varieties include Lager, Light, Blonde, Gluten Free, Ice, Watermelon, Apple Ale, Bubbly, Moscow Mule, and Hard Root Beer.

=== Lazy Mutt ===
Varieties include Farmhouse Ale, Gluten Free, Oktoberfest, Shandy, Alcoholic Ginger, Hefeweizen, Chocolate Cherry, Hazelnut Dark, Pumpkin Ale, Wet Hopped IPA, Winter Bock, Traditional IPA, So Cal IPA, American IPA, Belgian White Ale, and Strong Ale.

=== Bad Hare ===
Varieties include Autumn Ale, Blonde Ale, Rum Ale, Rye Ale, Scotch Ale, Bock Light, Oatmeal Stout, Espresso Stout, and White Chocolate.

=== Uptown Girl ===
Varieties include Premium Light, Cherry Belgian Red, and Strawberry Blonde.

Minhas Craft Brewery also produces Mountain Crest Classic Lager, Kirkland Signature Light, Simpler Times Pilsner, Huber Bock, 1845 Pils, Boatswain H.L.V. Ale, Minhas Swiss Style Amber, Axe Head Malt Liquor and Imperial Jack.

Trader Joe's

Minhas Craft Brewery Simpler Times Pilsner, Simpler Times Lager, Boatswain series and others are sold at Trader Joe's.

=== Kirkland ===
Minhas is the private label bottler of the Costco Brand Beer.

== See also ==
- Beer in the United States
- List of breweries in Wisconsin
