= Boston Pizza =

Canadian restaurant chain

Boston Pizza International, Inc.
- Monogram version of company logo
- Type: Public
- Traded as: TSX: BPF.UN
- Industry: Pizzeria Franchising
- Founded: 1964; 62 years ago in Edmonton, Alberta, Canada
- Headquarters: Richmond, British Columbia, Canada
- Number of locations: 395 restaurants (2022)
- Areas served: Canada, United States, and Mexico
- Products: Pizza, Pasta, Ribs, Hamburgers, Salads and Entrees
- Revenue: ▲CA$1.2 billion (2023)
- Owner: Jim Treliving; George Melville; Boston Pizza Royalties Income Fund
- Website: bostonpizza.com

Boston Pizza International Inc., doing business as Boston Pizza (BP; also known as Boston's The Gourmet Pizza Restaurant and Sports Bar outside of Canada) is a Canadian multinational restaurant chain that owns and franchises locations in Canada, the United States and Mexico.

== History ==
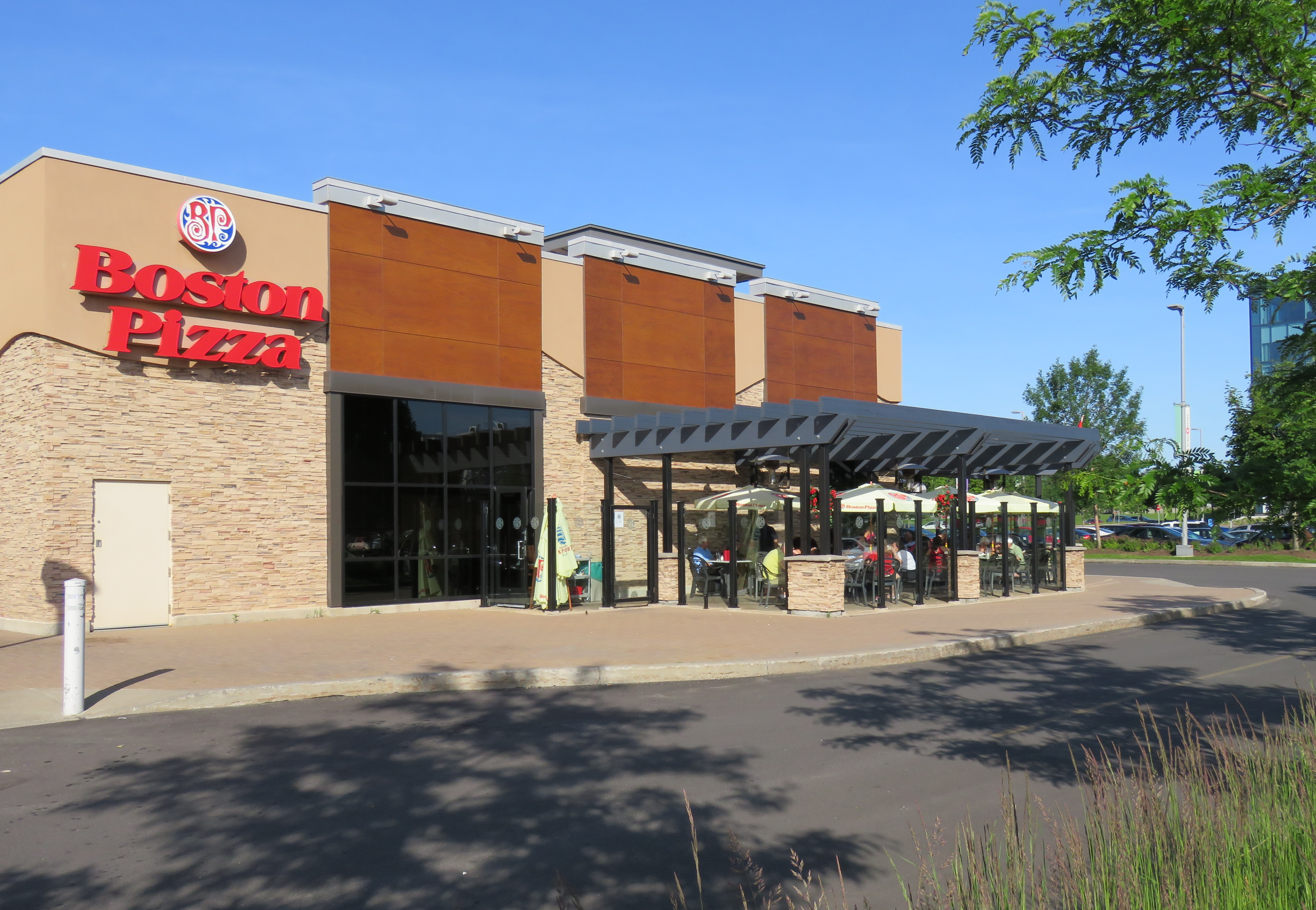
Boston Pizza in Laval, Quebec

Boston Pizza began in 1964 in Edmonton, Alberta, when Gus Agioritis opened Boston Pizza and Spaghetti House. By 1970, Boston Pizza had 17 locations in Western Canada, 15 of which were franchised.

One of the first franchisees was Jim Treliving, a Royal Canadian Mounted Police officer who lived down the street from the original location and was a regular customer. In 1968, he noticed the growing popularity of Boston Pizza and purchased the rights to open a restaurant in Penticton, British Columbia. While in Penticton, he met George Melville, a chartered accountant. He acted as Treliving's business consultant for four years, and, in 1973, became Treliving's business partner. Over 10 years, they opened 16 restaurants in British Columbia.

In 1983, Treliving and Melville acquired the Boston Pizza chain from Ron Coyle, who had acquired the company from Agioritis in 1978. The two divested 15 of their restaurants to other franchisees, converted one restaurant to a corporate training restaurant and set about establishing systems and operating standards to standardize company operations. In 1986, Boston Pizza became the official pizza supplier for Expo 86 in Vancouver. This major success for the company led to expansion in Eastern Canada, with the company opening three stores in Southern Ontario in 1989. Problems arising from a lack of local management led all three stores to close by the mid-1990s, putting a temporary halt on the company's eastward expansion.

By 1995, the chain had grown to 95 restaurants in Western Canada with sales in excess of CA$110 million. Over the many years, the restaurants had become a success, more sports bars had been established as an integral part of the business.

In 1997, Mark Pacinda was hired to attempt a further expansion into Eastern Canada. A regional office and restaurant were opened in Mississauga in 1997, followed by another restaurant in Ottawa in September 1998. The company later opened another regional office in Laval, Quebec, in April 2004. As of December 2023, there are 372 Boston Pizza restaurants in Canada, and over 50 Boston's restaurants in the U.S. and Mexico.

=== Boston's ===
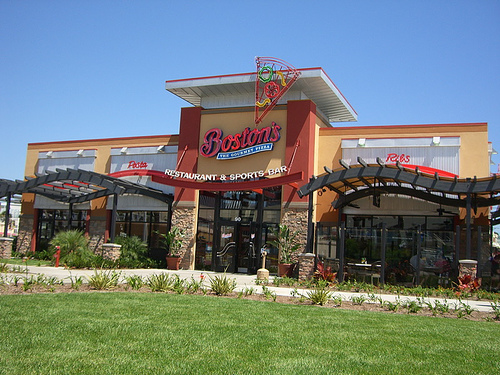
A former Boston's in Long Beach, California

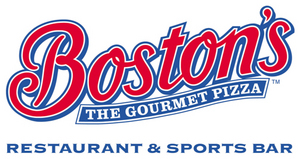
Former Boston's chain logo used in the United States and Mexico

Boston's is the U.S. and Mexican version of the Boston Pizza franchise. In 1998, a U.S. headquarters was set up in Dallas, Texas. The Boston Pizza name was changed to Boston's: The Gourmet Pizza, Restaurant and Sports Bar that same year. Boston's had over 30 stores in the U.S. and 22 in Mexico.

There are 13 U.S. states with restaurants, including California, Texas, and Georgia.

=== Promotional branding ===
As part of an advertising campaign during the first round of the 2011 Stanley Cup playoffs, when the Boston Bruins played the Montreal Canadiens, the company temporarily rebranded its Montreal locations as "Montreal Pizza". In the final round of the playoffs, when the Bruins played the Vancouver Canucks, the company temporarily rebranded its British Columbia locations as "Vancouver Pizza".

== Trademark dispute ==
In 2002, Boston Pizza commenced a lawsuit against Boston Market in the Federal Court of Canada over the trademark use of the word "Boston" in Canada. In its defence, Boston Market alleged that Boston Pizza's trademarks were invalid because they described a style of pizza from a specific area. The dispute continued after Boston Market ceased operations in Canada in 2004. The parties settled the dispute in 2008 under an agreement that Boston Market would not use the words "Boston" or "Boston Market" in Canada for five years for restaurants or any food or drink products (other than pre-packaged food products, but not including pizza and lasagna). Boston Market also agreed that it would not challenge Boston Pizza's use in Canada of any trademark that uses the words "Boston" or "Boston Pizza" (with certain exceptions).

== See also ==
- List of Canadian restaurant chains
- List of Canadian pizza chains
- Pizza in Canada
- Pizza cake, a Boston Pizza product which later went viral
