= Clearco =

Canadian venture capital firm

Clearco is a funding company led by Andrew Curtis that specializes in non-dilutive revenue-share agreements with start-ups. Clearbanc claims to make equity-free investments in businesses within 48 hours based on information provided on the two metrics ad spend and unit economics and calls this ‘The 20-Min Term Sheet’. Unlike venture capital firms that require stock, Clearco takes a fee on investments up to $10 million. Businesses apply online, and its payback fees range from 6–12.5%.

It is a Canadian business founded by Michele Romanow and Andrew D'Souza in 2015, and headquartered in Toronto. It partly uses Artificial Intelligence to make decisions on potential investments. As of August 2019, it has invested in 791 businesses, has a stated monthly average revenue of $121 million and raised $1 billion.

In 2021, Clearbanc rebranded itself Clearco to reflect the goal of long-term partnerships with clients based not only on financing. Between 2022 and 2023, the company experienced financial difficulties in a changing economic environment. Clearco laid off approximately 72% of their staff and saw the exit of its two co-founders Romanow and D'Souza.

== Business Model ==
Clearco offers capital from $10,000 up to $10 million to entrepreneurs. The platform uses an AI system to connect to a potential client's payment, ad, and e-commerce platforms to analyze their business's financial health and revenue. The platform then reviews the data and automates the diligence process, effectuating funding decisions within minutes. By only reviewing financial and marketing data, Clearco posits it is "able to remove the bias out of traditional VC funding", translating into more capital being extended to female founders "on their platform over the industry average".
