= Joseph Huber Brewing Company =

Wisconsin Company

Coordinates: 42°35′59.6″N 89°38′36.07″W

Joseph Huber Brewing Co.
- Founded: 1845
- Headquarters: Monroe, WI; United States

The Joseph Huber Brewing Company was founded in 1845 in Monroe, Wisconsin. Originally called The Blumer Brewery, it adopted the Huber name in 1947.

Huber reached its most successful point around 1978, when its Augsburger brand received awards from several prominent beer reviewers and became a top seller for the company. The brewery was sold in 1985 for $7.8 million; in 1988 the new owners sold the Augsburger label to Stroh Brewery Company and later briefly closed the brewery. Fred Huber, son of Joseph, bought the brewery and resumed operations in a partnership with Chicago's Berghoff family, but the brewery filed for bankruptcy and was sold in 1995. In 2006, the brewery and its brands were sold to Mountain Crest Brewing Company, of Calgary, Alberta, Canada. The Monroe brewery was renamed Minhas Craft Brewery.

== Recognition ==
- 2014 - Certificate of Excellence - Ranked #1 of 11 Attractions in Monroe on Trip Advisor
- 2014 - Minhas Craft Brewery Huber Bock awarded Silver for best bock from the World Beer Awards.
