= 1-800-GOT-JUNK? =

Canadian waste removal company

Coordinates: 49°15′58.50″N 123°05′03.66″W

RBDS Rubbish Boys Disposal Service Inc.
- Trade name: 1-800-GOT-JUNK?
- Formerly: The Rubbish Boys Disposal Service (1989–1998)
- Type: Private
- Industry: Waste management Franchising
- Founded: 1989; 37 years ago
- Founder: Brian Scudamore
- Headquarters: Vancouver, British Columbia, Canada
- Number of locations: 138 (2025)
- Key people: Brian Scudamore (CEO); Erik Church (President)
- Products: Junk Removal Services
- Owner: O2E Brands
- Website: www.1800gotjunk.com

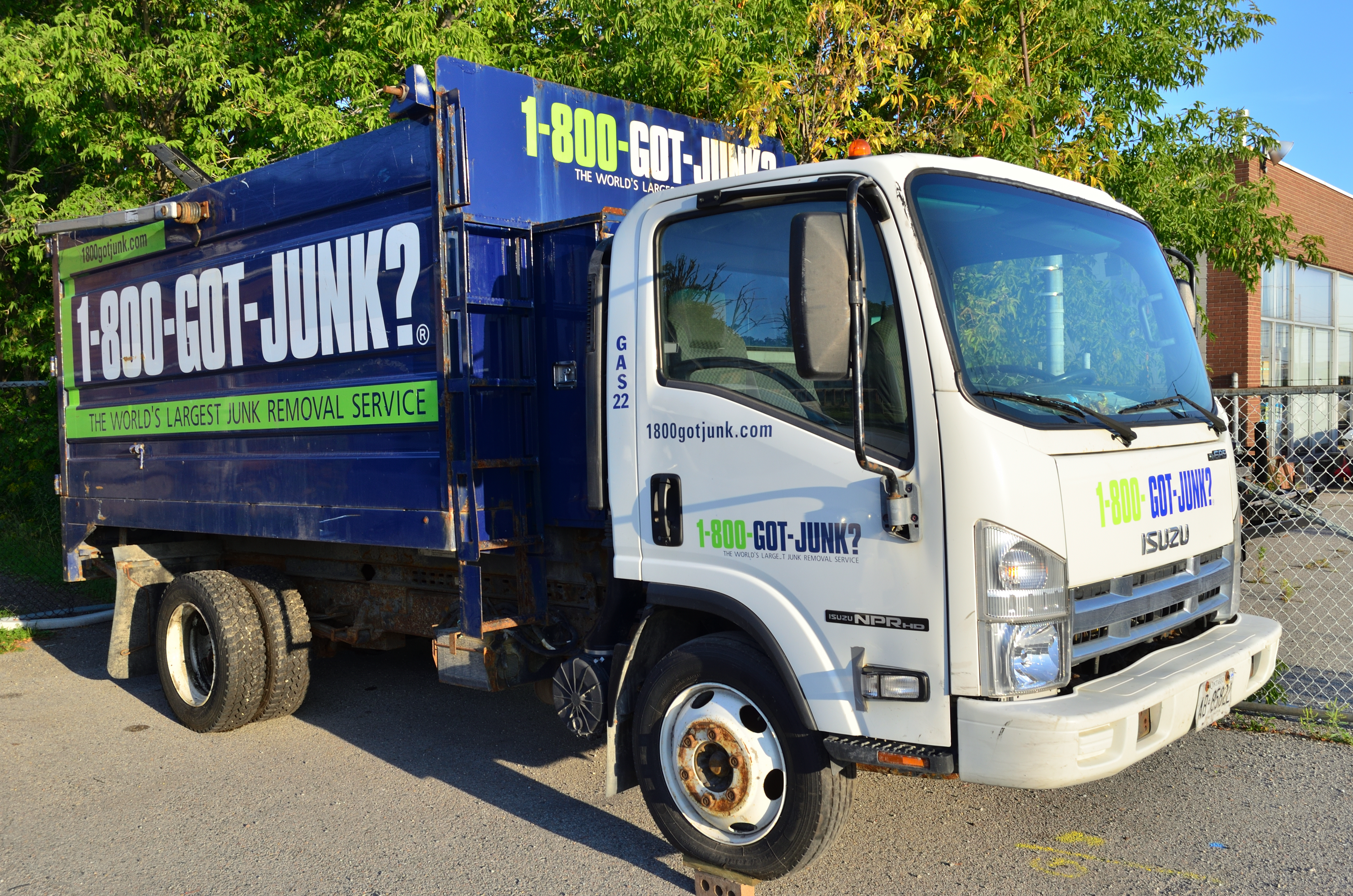
A typical Canadian 1-800-GOT-JUNK? vehicle in Ontario.

RBDS Rubbish Boys Disposal Service Inc. (doing business as 1-800-GOT-JUNK?) is a Canadian franchised residential and commercial junk removal company operating in the United States, Canada, and Australia. The company's business model consists of taking junk or trash haulage, and giving it a "clean" image through branding and marketing.

== History ==
The company started in Vancouver, British Columbia, Canada in 1989 by Brian Scudamore. He had the idea while he was in a McDonald's drive thru and saw a beat-up old truck offering junk removal services and thought to himself, "I can do better than that". It was incorporated as The Rubbish Boys Disposal Service, then in 1998 with its current name. The first franchise opened in 1997 in Victoria, British Columbia, and a second in Toronto in 1998. In 2000, the first franchise opened outside Canada, in Portland, Oregon.
