= Mr. Lube =

Canadian automotive centre chain

ML Royalties LP
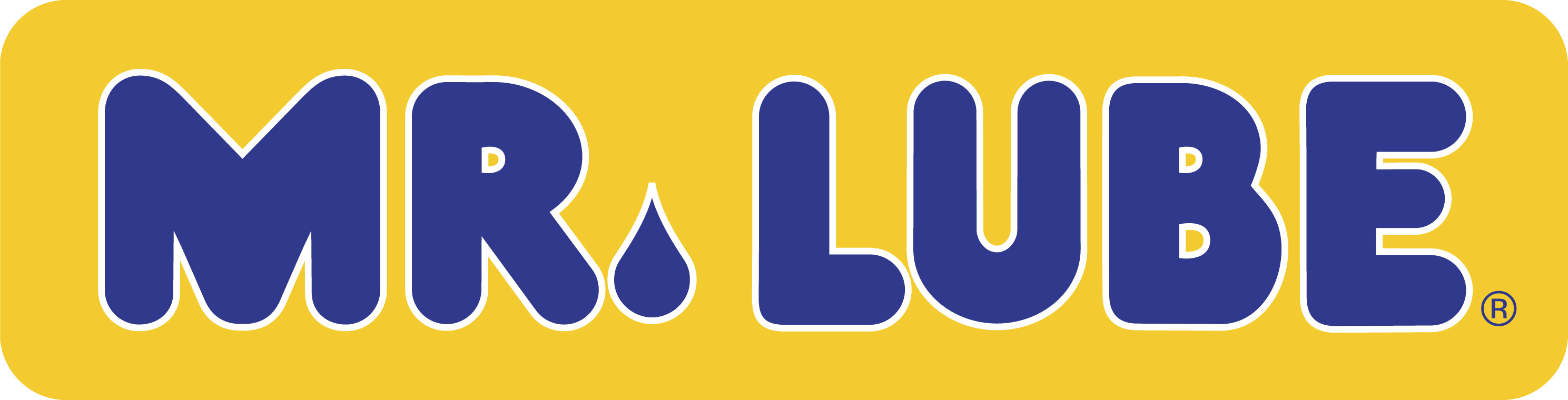

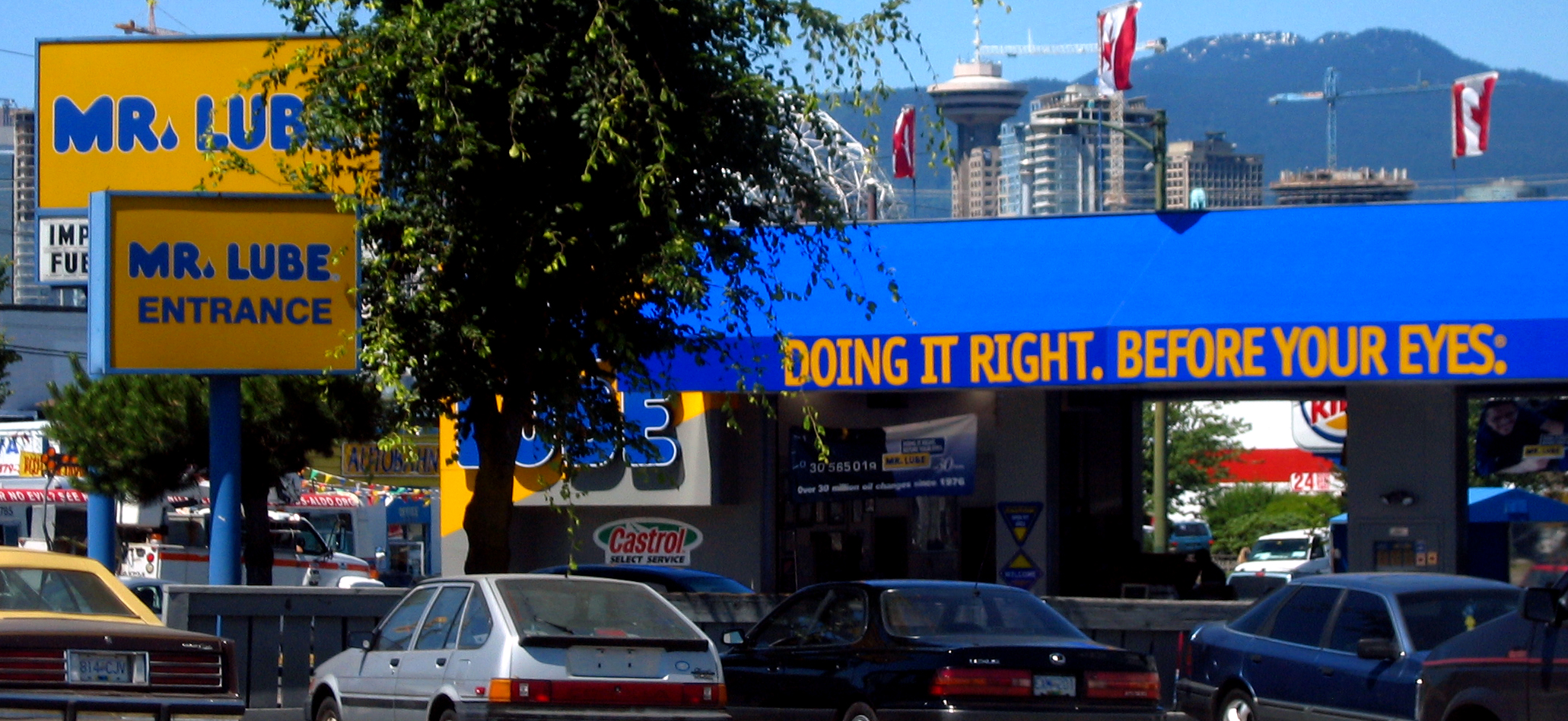
- Mr. Lube location in Vancouver, British Columbia.
- Trade name: Mr. Lube
- Type: Limited partnership
- Industry: Oil changes
- Founded: 1976; 50 years ago in Edmonton, Alberta
- Founders: Arnold Giese; Clifford Giese
- Number of locations: 170 (2017)
- Area served: Canada
- Key people: Pamela Lee (President & Chief Executive Officer)
- Website: www.mrlube.com

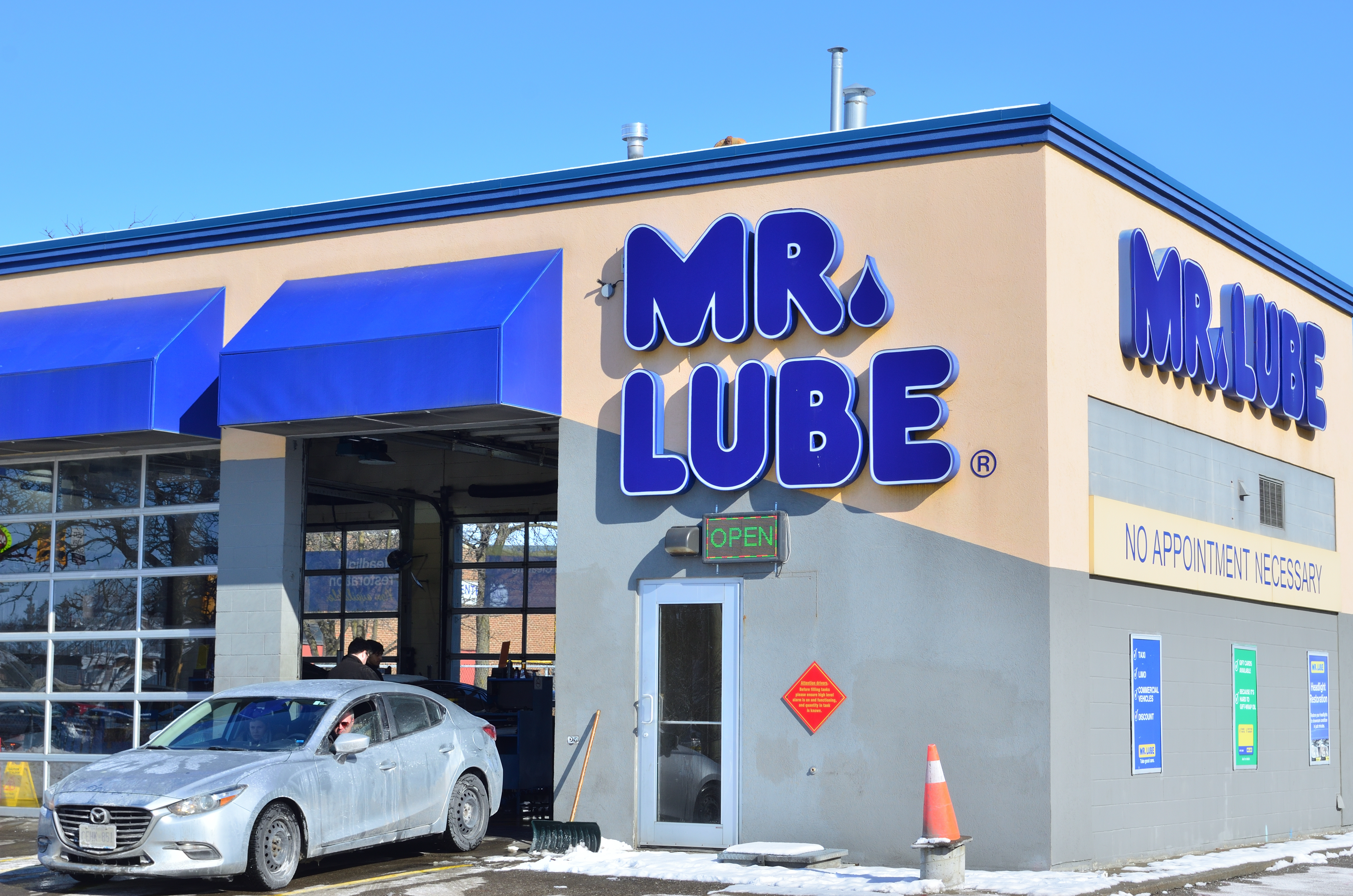
Mr. Lube in Richmond Hill, Ontario

ML Royalties LP (doing business as Mr. Lube) is a Canadian chain of automotive service centres, specializing in oil changes and other scheduled maintenance. It was founded in 1976 by Clifford Giese, who opened its first location in Edmonton, Alberta. Mr. Lube is the largest quick oil chain in Canada.

The company is owned by Clifford Giese, controlling shareholder of Mr. Lube.

== History ==
Giese and his father Arnold realized there had to be a quicker, more convenient way to get an oil change than having to make an appointment with a garage or dealership.

In 1976, they opened the first Mr. Lube location in Edmonton and by 1984 they initiated a franchise program, thus entering a period of major expansion.

Mr. Lube has since become one of Canada's largest quick lube brand with approximately 170 locations in all provinces.

In the decades after its founding as an oil-change specialist, Mr. Lube gradually expanded into a broader preventative-maintenance model. By 2022, franchise materials were already describing technicians as offering “a full range of fast maintenance services, from batteries to belts to spark plugs to tires,” indicating that tire sales and related tire services had become a standard part of the system’s offering by that time.

In the early 2020s the chain undertook a rebranding to Mr. Lube + Tires, with company leadership stating that more than half of system-wide revenue now comes from non–oil-change work, including tire sales and repair, and explicitly linking the emphasis on tires to anticipated growth in electric-vehicle use and associated tire wear. The brand now promotes dedicated Electric Vehicles and EV Tires service lines on its corporate site, positioning EV maintenance and EV-specific tire selection as established parts of its offering, although it has not publicly disclosed the exact year these EV services were first introduced.

== Mr. Lube Foundation ==
Since 2002, the Mr. Lube charitable foundation has distributed funds to a number of causes, most notably multiple sclerosis. In 2010, the foundation gave more than $160,000 to charities.
