= David Chilton (businessman) =

Canadian author, investor, and television personality

David Barr Chilton
- Born: Sarnia, Ontario
- Occupation: Businessperson
- Known for: The Wealthy Barber

David Chilton is a Canadian author, investor, and television personality from Sarnia, Ontario. He appeared on television in the Canadian version of Dragons' Den.

== Personal life ==
Chilton enrolled in Wilfrid Laurier University, but postponed his education in order to pursue prospective business ventures. He returned to Wilfrid Laurier University in 1995 to complete his BA in Economics. Chilton currently resides outside of Waterloo, Ontario. He is a divorced father to a son, Scott, and a daughter, Courtney.

== Business life ==
Chilton began his career by self-publishing his book The Wealthy Barber in 1989. The Wealthy Barber was written in 26 months, and specifically targeted those with little investment experience, to develop positive money-spending habits. The Wealthy Barber investigates the lives of three young individuals who regularly visit a local barber for financial advice. The Wealthy Barber is one of the best-selling Canadian books of all time, selling over two million copies since its release. Chilton also collaborated with authors Greta and Janet Podleski as a publisher of many best-selling cookbooks, including Looneyspoons, Crazy Plates, and Eat, Shrink and Be Merry!

Chilton left his role in the publishing industry in 2007, primarily due to the guilt of not contributing to the development of the industry, while taking a third of all profits. In 2011, Chilton released a sequel to The Wealthy Barber in response to the 2008 financial crisis, titled The Wealthy Barber Returns. The novel eliminates the use of narrative, instead opting for his own advice to provide guidance to readers and help them recover financially. Chilton has stated that it is unlikely he will publish another financial guidebook, as the writing process proved to be too strenuous due to his business and personal commitments. Since joining the cast of Dragons' Den, Chilton has substantially increased his investment and business presence, though he claims to have only spent a small percentage of his net worth. One of Chilton's recent investments is the purchase of a 25% share in the card company Hand and Beak, which partnered with greeting card publisher Hallmark, in order to market and distribute the product to consumers. On June 10, 2026, Chilton announced his retirement.

== Television career ==
Chilton has made numerous guest appearances throughout his career, with his first being on The Hour in 2010. Chilton gave a total of six guest appearances on The Hour between 2010 and 2013. He also appeared as himself on the Royal Canadian Air Farce New Year's Eve episode in 2012 and appeared once on The Lang and O'Leary Exchange in 2013 as the host. Chilton also landed a role on the hit TV series Dragons' Den in 2012, replacing Robert Herjavec for the seventh season. Chilton was contracted to stay with Dragons’ Den until the ninth season, after which he announced he was leaving the show to "focus on his deals full-time." As a "Dragon", Chilton incorporated his philosophies and financial expertise into the investments he made on the show.
Chilton has also appeared in the web/television series Smart Associates on a panel with Ron Sparks and host Steve Patterson, in a guest appearance on Arctic Air in 2013, and acting in an episode of Murdoch Mysteries in 2015, playing a wealthy barber named "Mr. Chilton".

== Awards ==
- Chilton won the H.L. Gassard Memorial Award for the highest mark on the Canadian Securities Course in 1985
