= Jim Treliving =

Canadian businessman and TV personality (born 1941)

Jim Treliving OC
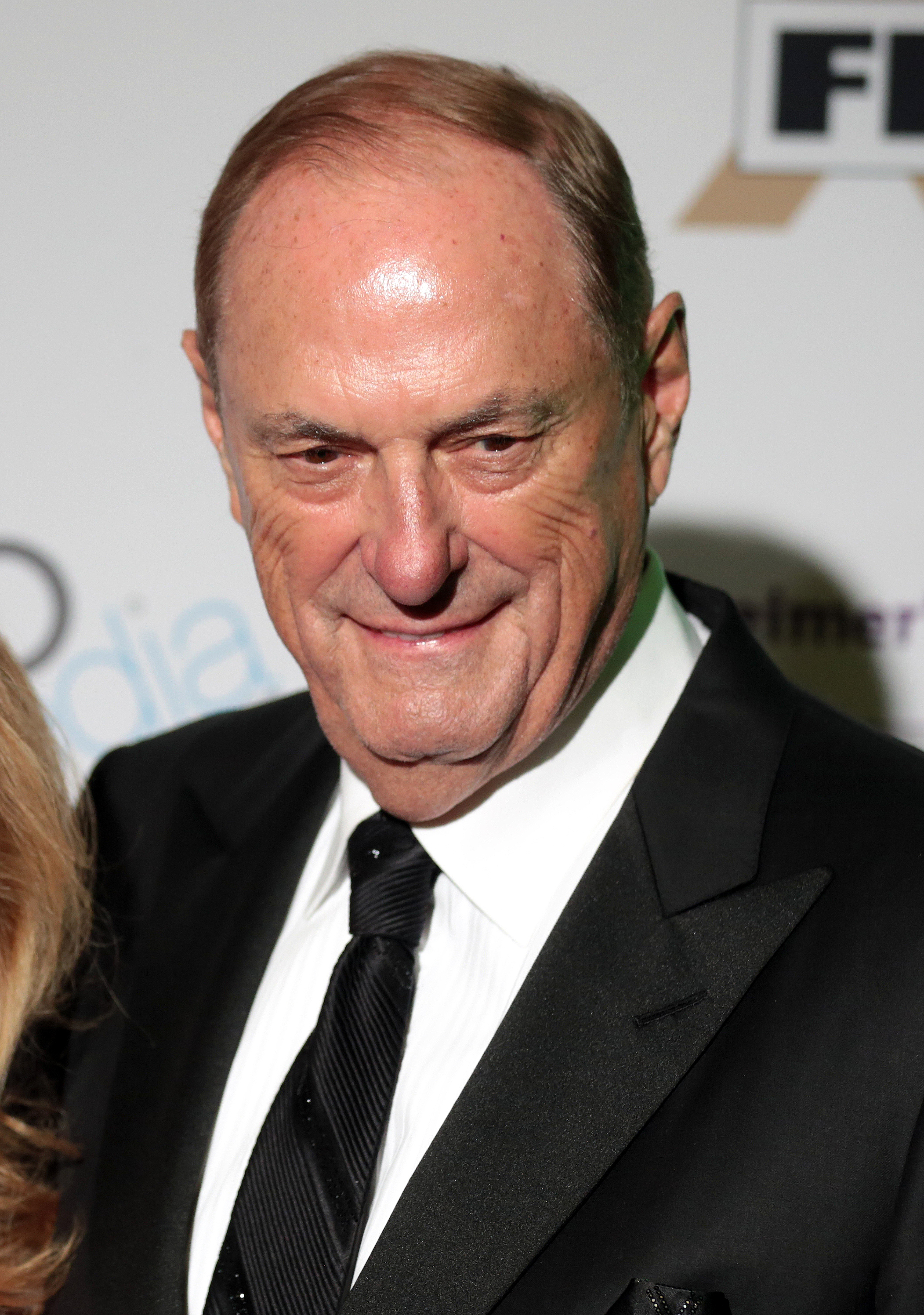
- Treliving in 2018
- Born: Walter James Treliving; 12 May 1941 (age 85); Virden, Manitoba, Canada
- Occupations: Businessman, television personality
- Board member of: WPHL Holdings, Inc. Global Entertainment Corporation
- Relatives: Brad Treliving (son)

Walter James Treliving OC (born 12 May 1941) is a Canadian businessman and TV personality who co-owns Boston Pizza. From 2006 to 2021, Treliving was one of the investor "dragons" on the Canadian television show Dragons' Den.

== Career ==
Treliving was a member of the Royal Canadian Mounted Police in Alberta and British Columbia from 1959 to 1966. In 1968, Treliving noticed the growing popularity of Boston Pizza and purchased the rights to open a restaurant in Penticton, British Columbia. With George Melville, a chartered accountant and Treliving's business consultant and later partner, in 1983 he bought the Boston Pizza chain from Ron Coyle. By 1995, the chain had grown to 95 restaurants in Western Canada with sales in excess of $110 million (CA$). Currently Boston Pizza and Boston's the Gourmet Pizza (US and Mexico division) have over 435 restaurants throughout North America.

In 2006, Treliving joined the cast of the CBC Television program, Dragons' Den. Treliving was one of the "dragons", or potential investors in the business propositions made by aspiring entrepreneurs. He left in 2020. Treliving had been with the show for the first fifteen of its seasons.

== Personal life ==
One of Treliving's children, Brad Treliving, is an ice hockey executive, formerly the general manager of the Toronto Maple Leafs and of the Calgary Flames of the National Hockey League.

== Awards ==
- Canada Walk of Fame: 2019
- Order of Canada
