= 25th Gemini Awards =

2010 awards for Canadian television

- Date: November 15, 2010
- Venue: Winter Garden Theatre, Toronto
- Hosted by: Cory Monteith

Television/radio coverage
- Network: Global, Showcase

The Academy of Canadian Cinema & Television's 25th Gemini Awards were held on November 15, 2010, to honour achievements in Canadian television. The awards show, which was hosted by Cory Monteith, took place at Toronto’s Winter Garden Theatre and was broadcast on Showcase and Global.

== Best Dramatic Series ==
- The Tudors – Peace Arch Entertainment, Reveille Productions, Working Title Films, Showtime Networks. Producers: Sheila Hockin, Morgan O’Sullivan, John Weber
- Durham County – Muse Entertainment, Back Alley Film Productions. Producers: Janis Lundman, Adrienne Mitchell, Laurie Finstad-Knizhnik, Michael Prupas
- Flashpoint – Pink Sky Entertainment, Avamar Entertainment. Producers: Anne Marie La Traverse, Bill Mustos
- Republic of Doyle – Fireworks Entertainment, Take the Shot Productions. Producers: Allan Hawco, Rob Blackie, John Vatcher, Michael Levine
- Stargate Universe – Acme Shark Productions, MGM Television. Producers: Brad Wright, Carl Binder, Robert C. Cooper, John G. Lenic, N. John Smith

== Best Dramatic Mini-Series ==
- The Summit – Shaftesbury Films, Media Headquarters. Producers: Christina Jennings, Justin Bodle, Robert Cohen, Shari Cohen, Scott Garvie, Adam Haight, Robin Neinstein, Ewa Radwanska
- Alice – Reunion Pictures, Studio Eight Productions, RHI Entertainment. Producers: Matthew O'Connor, Alex Brown, Jamie Brown, Robert Halmi Sr., Robert Halmi, Jr., Michael O'Connor, Lisa Richardson
- The Phantom – Muse Entertainment, RHI Entertainment. Producers: Michael Prupas, Robert Halmi Jr., Robert Halmi Sr., Irene Litinsky

== Best TV Movie ==
- She Drives Me Crazy – Shaftesbury Films. Producers: Christina Jennings, Scott Garvie, Julian Grant, Rob Green, Graham Ludlow, Laurie McLarty, Sam Okun, Kelly Rowan
- Abroad – Capture Entertainment, Big Tree Productions. Producers: Meredith Caplan, Leah McLaren, Julia Stannard, Simon Wright
- Deadliest Sea – Original Productions, Working On The Edge Productions. Producers: Karen Wookey, Thom Beers, Philip Segal
- The Good Times Are Killing Me – Shaftesbury Films. Producers: Christina Jennings, Patrick Cassavetti, Scott Garvie, Laura Harbin, Noel Hedges, Julie Lacey, Graham Ludlow, Jan Peter Meyboom, Kelly Rowan

== Best Comedy Program or Series ==
- Less Than Kind – Breakthrough Entertainment, Buffalo Gal Pictures. Producers: Phyllis Laing, Marvin Kaye, Ira Levy, Mark McKinney, Paula Smith, Garry Campbell, Chris Sheasgreen, Peter Williamson
- Dan for Mayor – Sad Glasses Productions, QVF, The Comedy Network. Producers: Kevin White, Mark Farrell, Paul Mather, Susan Murdoch
- Little Mosque on the Prairie – WestWind Pictures. Producers: Clark Donnelly, Colin Brunton, Mary Darling, Michael Snook, Al Magee
- Pure Pwnage – TV For Noobs Productions, ROFLMAO Productions, Sphinx Productions, Duopoly. Producers: Geoff Lapaire, Jarett Cale, Derek Harvie, Ron Mann, Catherine Tait
- Rick Mercer Report – CBC, Island Edge. Producers: Gerald Lunz, Rick Mercer

== Best Music or Variety Program or Series ==
- 2009 MuchMusic Video Awards – CTVglobemedia. Producers: John Kampilis, Bob Pagrach, Sheila Sullivan
- Juno Awards of 2010 – Canadian Academy of Recording Arts and Sciences, Insight Productions. Producers: John Brunton, Melanie Berry, Barbara Bowlby, Lindsay Cox, Ed Robinson, Louise Wood
- Battle of the Blades – Insight Productions. Producers: John Brunton, Kevin Albrecht, Sandra Bezic, Barbara Bowlby, Sue Brophey
- Canadian Country Music Awards 2009 – Canadian Country Music Association, Corkscrew Media. Producers: Scott Henuset, Morris Abraham, Susan Edwards
- So You Think You Can Dance Canada – Danse TV Productions. Producers: Sandra Faire, Milan Curry-Sharples, Trisa Dayot, Janet Lavack, Bronwyn Warren, Allan Manson

== Best Performing Arts Program or Series, or Arts Documentary Program or Series ==
- Fire Jammers – Yap Films. Producers: Elliott Halpern, Pauline Duffy *Capturing Reality: The Art of Documentary – National Film Board of Canada. Producer: Michelle Van Beusekom
- Live At... – Live Music Special Productions. Producers: Joel Stewart, Warren Sulatycky
- Nureyev – Mossanen Productions. Producers: Moze Mossanen, Peter Gentile
- Star Portraits – PTV Productions. Producers: Andrea Nemtin, Ian Dunbar, Theresa Kowall-Ship

== Best Talk Series ==
- Spectacle: Elvis Costello with... – Prospero Pictures, Reinvention Entertainment, Rocket Pictures, Tri-Fi Productions, Chatting Glasses, SpyBox Pictures. Producers: Elvis Costello, David Furnish, Steve Hamilton-Shaw, Jordan Jacobs, Elton John, Martin Katz, Steve Warden
- The After Show – MTV. Producers: Darcy MacNeil, Pam de Montmorency, Alex Sopinka, Garrett Wintrip
- The Hour with George Stroumboulopoulos – Canadian Broadcasting Corporation. Producers: Susan Taylor, George Stroumboulopoulos, David Freeman, Claire Adams
- MTV Live – MTV. Producers: Daryn Jones, Pam de Montmorency, Alex Sopinka

== Best Reality Program or Series ==
- The Cupcake Girls – Force Four Entertainment. Producers: John Ritchie, Rob Bromley, Gillian Lowrey, Peter Waal, Grant Gresch
- Canada's Next Top Model – Temple Street Productions. Producers: Sheila Hockin, Brad Brough, Lena Cordina, David Fortier, Jay Manuel, Ivan Schneeberg
- Dragons' Den – 2waytraffic, Canadian Broadcasting Corporation. Producers: Tracie Tighe, Mike Armitage, Lisa Gabriele
- Love It or List It – Big Coat Productions. Producers: Maria Armstrong, Catherine Fogarty

== Best General/Human Interest Series ==
- Tosca: Flexing at 49 – Wiwa Productions. Producers: Linda Stregger, Barbara Barde
- Family Renovation – Ocean Entertainment. Producer: Johanna Eliot
- Hell on Hooves – Juxtapose Productions. Producers: Dennis Hrapchak, Doug Hudema
- Remedy Me! – Creative Atlantic Communications. Producers: Janice Evans, Greg Jones, Wendy Purves
- X-Weighted: Families – Anaid Productions. Producers: Margaret Mardirossian, David Way, Candice Tipton, Helen Schmidt, Roger Larry

== Donald Brittain Award for Best Social/Political Documentary Program ==
- Broke – ID Productions. Producer: Rosvita Dransfeld
- A Dream For Kabul – InformAction, National Film Board of Canada. Producers: Nathalie Barton, Patricia Bergeron, Yves Bisaillon
- Reel Injun – Rezolution Pictures, National Film Board of Canada, Canadian Broadcasting Corporation. Producers: Christina Fon, Catherine Bainbridge, Ravida Din, Linda Ludwick, Catherine Olsen, Adam Symansky, Ernest Webb
- Up Against The Wall – Stormy Nights Productions. Producers: Eileen Thalenberg, Gail McIntyre
- Water On The Table – LizMars Productions. Producer: Liz Marshall

== Best Documentary Series ==
- Licence to Drill – Pixcom. Producers: Nicola Merola, Jacquelin Bouchard, Emmanuelle Wiecha
- Aftermath – Cream Productions. Producers: David W. Brady, Larry Bambrick, Christopher Rowley
- Down The Mighty River – Rezolution Pictures. Producers: Christina Fon, Catherine Bainbridge, Linda Ludwick, Ernest Webb
- The View from Here – TVOntario. Producer: Jane Jankovic
- Word Travels- Omnifilm Entertainment. Producers: Deborah Wainwright, Michael Chechik, Brian Hamilton, Heather Hawthorn-Doyle

== Best History Documentary Program ==
- Paris 1919 – National Film Board of Canada, 13 Productions, Galafilm, Arte. Producers: Gerry Flahive, Silva Basmajian, Arnie Gelbart, Paul Saadoun
- Dive Detectives: Edmund Fitzgerald – Yap Films. Producers: Elliott Halpern, Pauline Duffy
- Manson – Cineflix. Producers: Simon Lloyd, Nick Godwin, Tom Parkhouse, John Vandervelde
- Passage – National Film Board of Canada, PTV Productions, John Walker Productions. Producers: John Walker, Andrea Nemtin, Kent Martin, Bill Nemtin

== Best Biography Documentary Program ==
- Genius Within: The Inner Life of Glenn Gould – White Pine Pictures. Producer: Peter Raymont
- Karsh Is History – Productions Grand Nord. Producer: Ian McLaren
- Prokofiev: The Unfinished Diary – Take 3 Productions, 13 Productions. Producers: Barbara Barde, Yosif Feyginberg, Paul Saadoun, Virginie Guibbaud, Linda Stregger

== Best Science, Technology, Nature, Environment or Adventure Documentary Program ==
- The Great Sperm Race – Cream Productions, Blink Entertainment. Producers: David W. Brady, Christopher Rowley
- A Murder Of Crows – Canadian Broadcasting Corporation, Arte. Producer: Susan Fleming
- One Ocean: Mysteries of the Deep – Merit Motion Pictures. Producers: Merit Jensen Carr, Michael Allder, Caroline Underwood
- The Plastic Fantastic Brain: Total Recall and the Spotless Mind – Stornoway Communications. Producers: Paul Kemp, Brian Cotter
- The Quantum Tamers: Revealing our Weird and Wired Future – Title Entertainment. Producers: John Matlock, Derek Diorio, Frank Taylor

== Best News Information Series ==
- Global National – Everyday Hero Special – Global News. Producers: Bryan Mullan, Mark Blanchard, Bryan Grahn, Kevin O'Neill, Trevor Owens
- Marketplace – CBC. Producer: Tassie Notar
- the fifth estate – Canadian Broadcasting Corporation. Producer: Sally Reardon

== Best News Information Segment ==
- The National/CBC News – The Boy in the Moon – Canadian Broadcasting Corporation. Producers: Carmen Merrifield, Sheldon Beldick, Andy Hincenbergs
- The National/CBC News – Playing for Peace – Canadian Broadcasting Corporation. Producers: Adrienne Arsenault, Erin Boudreau, Richard Devey
- The National/CBC News – Canada's Ugly Secret – Canadian Broadcasting Corporation. Producers: Mellissa Fung, Sheldon Beldick, Lynn Burgess, Paul Seeler
- CBC News: Sunday – Iran's Young Rebels – Canadian Broadcasting Corporation. Producers: Michael Kearns, Manmeet Ahluwalia, Bahman Kalbasi, Ed Middleton, Evan Solomon
- Canadian Cold Case: The Bomb That Killed Wayne Greavette – CBC News. Producers: David Ridgen, Stephanie Kampf

== Best Local Newscast, Large Market ==
- Global News Hour at 6 – Global BC. Producers: Ian Haysom, Clive Jackson, Oliver Lum, Randy McHale, Tim Perry
- CBC News: Toronto at 6:00 – Canadian Broadcasting Corporation. Producers: Sophia Hadzipetros, Alan Habbick, Austin Webb
- CBC News: Winnipeg – Canadian Broadcasting Corporation. Producers: Melanie Verhaeghe, Chris Armstrong, Kevin Cox, Brad Lillies

== Best Local Newscast, Small Market ==
- CBC News: Ottawa – Canadian Broadcasting Corporation. Producers: Paula Waddell, Lynn Douris
- CBC News: Saskatchewan – Canadian Broadcasting Corporation. Producers: Paul Dederick, Heather Avery, Jonathan Shanks, Costa Maragos
- CBC News: Nova Scotia at 6:00 – Canadian Broadcasting Corporation. Producers: Nancy Waugh, Jamie Lipsit, Tom Murphy, David Pate, Ken Publicover

== Best Breaking News Coverage ==
- CityNews Vaughan Tornado (Citytv). Producers: Tina Cortese, Katia Del Col, Ramneek Gill, Kathleen O'Keefe, Amar Sodhi
- Global National – Catastrophe In Haiti – Global News. Producers: Kenton Boston, Mark Blanchard, Neill Fitzpatrick, Bryan Grahn, Rosa Hwang, Kam Razavi, Doriana Temolo

== Best News Special Event Coverage ==
- CBC News: Remembrance Day Special – Canadian Broadcasting Corporation. Producers: Mark Bulgutch, Tom Dinsmore, Fred Parker
- Global National – Canada Remembers – Global News. Producers: Neill Fitzpatrick, Rosa Hwang, Pam McKenzie, Bryan Mullan, Maureen Richardson

== Best Lifestyle/Practical Information Series ==
- How to Look Good Naked Canada – Insight Productions. Producers: John Brunton, Barbara Bowlby, Andrea Gabourie
- Agent Vs Agent – Proper Television. Producers: Guy O'Sullivan, Lesia Capone, Robert Scott
- Chuck's Day Off – Whalley-Abbey Media. Producers: Debbie Travis, Hans Rosenstein
- Holmes Inspection – The Holmes Group. Producers: Mike Holmes, Pete Kettlewell, Michael Quast
- Til Debt Do Us Part – Frantic Films. Producers: Jamie Brown, Jennifer Horvath

== Best Animated Program or Series ==
- Glenn Martin, DDS – Cuppa Coffee Studios, Tornante Animation, Rogers Communications. Producer: Adam Shaheen
- Guess with Jess – Nelvana, Classic Media. Producers: Tracey Dodokin, Ceri Barnes, Scott Dyer, Jocelyn Hamilton, Doug Murphy, Jane Smith, Annika Bluhm
- Johnny Test – Cookie Jar Group. Producers: Michael Hirsh, Toper Taylor
- Kid vs. Kat – Studio B Productions, YTV, Disney XD. Producers: Blair Peters, Chris Bartleman, Jamie Turner
- Wapos Bay (Karma Film). Producers: Dennis Jackson, Melanie Jackson, Anand Ramayya

== Best Pre-School Program or Series ==
- The Ocean Room – Sinking Ship Entertainment. Producers: J. J. Johnson, Matthew Bishop, Blair Powers
- Dino Dan – Sinking Ship Entertainment. Producers: J. J. Johnson, Matthew Bishop, Blair Powers
- Kids Canada – Canadian Broadcasting Corporation. Producers: Marie McCann, Phil McCordic, Erin Curtin, Nadine Henry, Patty Sullivan, Sid Bobb, Jim Taylor
- Peep and the Big Wide World – WGBH-TV, 9 Story Media Group, TVOntario, Discovery Kids. Producers: Vince Commisso, Kate Taylor, Marisa Wolsky
- Wibbly Pig – Wish Films, 9 Story Media Group. Producers: Vince Commisso, Will Brenton, Helen Cadwallader, Steven Jarosz, Iain Lauchlan, Natalie Osborne

== Best Children’s or Youth Fiction Program or Series ==
- Overruled! – Shaftesbury Films. Producers: Christina Jennings, Jeff Biederman, Suzanne French, Scott Garvie, Laura Harbin, Jan Peter Meyboom, Jeffrey Allan Schechter
- Degrassi: The Next Generation – Bell Media, Epitome Pictures. Producers: Linda Schuyler, Stephen Stohn, Brendon Yorke, David Lowe, Stephanie Williams, Stefan Brogren
- Pillars of Freedom – Smiley Guy Studios, Nexus Media. Producers: Jonas Diamond, Jeremy Diamond, Donald Duchene, Denny Silverthorne
- That's So Weird! – Halifax Film Company. Producers: Jeff Copeland, Charles Bishop, Michael Donovan, Floyd Kane, Gary Pearson
- Total Drama Action – Fresh TV, Elliott Animation. Producers: Tom McGillis, George Elliott, Brian Irving, Jennifer Pertsch

== Best Children's or Youth Non-Fiction Program or Series ==
- Canada's Super Speller – Halifax Film Company. Producers: Michael Donovan, Charles Bishop, Cheryl Hassen, Beth Stevenson, Katrina Walsh
- A World of Wonders – Genuine Pictures. Producer: Donna Leon
- Survive This – 9 Story Entertainment. Producers: Vince Commisso, Craig Baines, Steven Jarosz, Les Stroud, David Brady
- Mark’s Moments – TVOntario. Producers: Marney Malabar, Daniel Bourré, Pat Ellingson, Mark Sykes

== Best Sports Analysis or Commentary Program, Series or Segment ==
- Superbodies – CTV. Producers: Don Young, Les Tomlin
- On Home Ice – Aquila Productions. Producers: Dave Toms, D.H. Metz, Gord Redel, Don Young
- TSN: The Reporters with Dave Hodge – TSN. Producers: Ken Volden, David Stiff

== Best Sports Feature Segment ==
- Vancouver 2010 Olympic Winter Games – Closing Essay – Sportsnet. Producers: Stephen Brunt, Matt Dunn
- Hockey Night In Canada – Inside Hockey, KHL Feature – Canadian Broadcasting Corporation. Producer: Robert McDerment
- 2009 Grey Cup – New Canadians – Canadian Broadcasting Corporation. Producers: Dave Naylor, Paul Harrington
- Vancouver 2010 Olympic Winter Games – John Furlong's Olympic Journey – Canadian Broadcasting Corporation. Producers: Don Young, Carlos Esteves, George Saturnino

== Best Live Sporting Event ==
- Vancouver 2010 Olympic Winter Games – CTV. Producers: Keith Pelley, Rick Chisholm, Gord Cutler
- 2009 Grey Cup – TSN. Producers: Paul Graham, Jon Hynes
- 2010 World Junior Ice Hockey Championships Gold Medal Game – TSN. Producers: Paul Graham, Jon Hynes
- Hockey Night In Canada – Stanley Cup Finals, Game 7, Pittsburgh at Detroit – Canadian Broadcasting Corporation. Producers: Sherali Najak, Brian Spear, Doug Walton

== Best Original Program or Series produced for Digital Media – Fiction ==
- The Vetala – Jove Digital. Producers: Damon Vignale, Peter Scarth
- My Pal Satan – Canadian Film Centre, Shoes Full of Feet. Producers: Dennis Heaton, Kathryn Emslie, Bryce Mitchell

== Best Original Program or Series produced for Digital Media – Non-Fiction ==
- Love Letters to the Future – Xenophile Media. Producers: Patrick Crowe, Amit Breuer, Thomas Wallner
- City Sonic – Kensington Communications, White Pine Pictures. Producers: Robert Lang, Janice Dawe, Cameron Mitchell, David Oppenheim, Peter Raymont
- Waterlife – National Film Board of Canada. Producers: Kevin McMahon, Adrian Belina, Gelareh Darabi, Tammy Everts, Brendan Good, Mikko Haapoja, Spencer Hall, Mark McQuillan, Aaron Morris, Steph Pigott, Pablo Vio, Rob McLaughlin, Loc Dao

== Best Cross-Platform Project – Non-Fiction ==
- Kraft Hockeyville 2010 – Canadian Broadcasting Corporation. Producers: Lauren Pare, Dayton Pereira, Dan Tavares, Mike Yokota
- One Ocean – Merit Motion Pictures, Tactica Communications. Producers: Kevin Glasier, Merit Jensen Carr, Vergil Kanne, Alexandra Rosentreter, Annette Bradford
- TotallyADD.com – Big Brain Productions. Producers: Rick Green, Ava Green, James Milward
- Vancouver 2010 Olympic Winter Games – CTV. Producers: Alon Marcovici, Marc Dinsdale, Mark Silver, Alyson Walker
- Licence to Drill – Pixcom. Producers: Nicola Merola, Jacquelin Bouchard, Emmanuelle Wiecha

== Best Cross-Platform Project – Fiction ==
- Being Erica Webisodes – Temple Street Productions. Producers: Ivan Schneeberg, David Fortier, Jessie Gabe, Jason Lorr, Eva Riintze, Thom Ryder
- Sanctuary – My Plastic Badger Productions. Producers: Jim Bogusz, Andrea Gorfolova, Patrick Crowe
- Cra$h & Burn – Investigation Productions, Whizbang Films. Producers: Frank Siracusa, Penny McDonald, Peter Miskimmin

== Best Cross-Platform Project – Children’s and Youth ==
- Taste Buds – Marblemedia. Producers: Mark J.W. Bishop, Sasha Boersma, Ted Brunt, Matthew Hornburg, Johnny Kalangis
- Stoked – Fresh TV, Marblemedia. Producers: Mark J.W. Bishop, Sasha Boersma, Ted Brunt, Matthew Hornburg, Tom McGillis
- RollBots Online – Xenophile Media. Producers: Patrick Crowe, Keith Clarkson, Thomas Wallner
- Overruled! – You Rule! – Shaftesbury Films, Smokebomb Entertainment. Producers: Shane Kinnear, Jay Bennett, Jérémie Bernard, Nicole Mickelow, Jarrett Sherman

== Best Direction in a Dramatic Program or Mini-Series ==
- Sudz Sutherland – Guns – (CBC/Hungry Eyes Media/Peace Arch Entertainment)
- Nick Copus – The Summit (Shaftesbury Films/Media Headquarters)
- T. J. Scott – Deadliest Sea (Original Productions/Working On The Edge Productions)
- Jeff Woolnough – Keep Your Head Up, Kid: The Don Cherry Story (Entertainment One/Blue Coach Productions)
- David Wu – Iron Road (Mainland Productions/CBC)

== Best Direction in a Dramatic Series ==
- David Frazee – Flashpoint – One Wrong Move (Pink Sky Entertainment/Avamar Entertainment)
- Andy Mikita – Stargate Universe – Air Part 1 (Acme Shark Productions/MGM Television)
- Adrienne Mitchell – Durham County – Little Lost Children (Muse Entertainment/Back Alley Film Productions)
- Jeremy Podeswa – The Tudors, Episode 308 (Peace Arch Entertainment/Reveille Productions/Working Title Films/Showtime Networks)
- Stephen Surjik – Flashpoint – Aisle 13 (Pink Sky Entertainment/Avamar Entertainment)

== Best Direction in a News Information Program or Series ==
- Oleh Rumak – the fifth estate – Death Online (CBC)
- Kathleen Coughlin – Marketplace – Canada's Worst Cellphone Bill (CBC)
- Dave Toms – On Home Ice (Aquila Productions)
- Claude Vickery – the fifth estate – Bus 1170 (CBC)

== Best Direction in a Documentary Program ==
- Neil Diamond, Catherine Bainbridge, Jeremiah Hayes – Reel Injun (Rezolution Pictures/NFB/CBC)
- Rosvita Dransfeld – Broke (ID Productions)
- Julian Jones – The Great Sperm Race (Cream Productions/Blink Entertainment)
- Rob King – Silent Bombs: All For the Motherland (4 Square Productions Canada)
- Nimisha Mukerji, Philip Lyall – 65_Redroses – Force Four Entertainment/CBC Newsworld/Dualogue Productions)

== Best Direction in a Documentary Series ==
- Stavros Stavrides, Leslie Lucas, John Westheuser – Licence to Drill – Paydirt (Pixcom)
- Mike Downie – One Ocean – Birth of an Ocean (Merit Motion Pictures)
- Leon Laflamme – Love, Hate and Propaganda – Truth and Total War (CBC)
- Jeff Semple – Ancestors in the Attic – Black Market Baby? (Primitive Entertainment)
- Wendy Trueman – Mega Builders – Big Rig (Barna-Alper Productions)

== Best Direction in a Comedy Program or Series ==
- Ian Ross MacDonald – Pure Pwnage – The Day the Lan Centre Stood Still (TV For Noobs Productions/ROFLMAO Productions/Sphinx Productions/Duopoly)
- James Allodi – Little Mosque on the Prairie – Keeping the Faith (WestWind Pictures)
- James Dunnison – Less Than Kind – First Nighters (Breakthrough Entertainment/Buffalo Gal Pictures)
- Michael Kennedy – Little Mosque on the Prairie – A Lease Too Far (WestWind Pictures)
- Henry Sarwer-Foner – Rick Mercer Report – Episode 11 (CBC/Island Edge)

== Best Direction in a Variety Program or Series ==
- Joan Tosoni – Battle of the Blades – Canadian Hits & Pairs Best (Insight Productions)
- Morris Abraham – Canadian Country Music Awards 2009 (Canadian Country Music Association/Corkscrew Media)
- John Keffer – Live in the Lot with Billy Talent (CTVglobemedia)
- John Keffer – 2009 MuchMusic Video Awards (CTVglobemedia)
- Joel Stewart – Johnny Reid: Live at the Jubilee (Country Wide Productions/ CMT)

== Best Direction in a Performing Arts Program or Series ==
- Moze Mossanen – Nureyev (Mossanen Productions)
- Brent Fidler, Eric Goldstein – Poe: Last Days of the Raven (Theater Crossing Film)
- Michael Morrow – Fire Jammers (Yap Films)

== Best Direction in a Lifestyle/Practical Information Program or Series ==
- William Morrison – Glutton for Punishment – Gumbo Cook-Off (Paperny Entertainment)
- Patricia Harris Seeley – X-Weighted: Families – Daniel (Anaid Productions)
- Lara Leavoy – How to Look Good Naked Canada – Lo & Mo (Insight Productions)
- Brian Rice – Cold Blood – Making a Killing (Canal D/Cineflix/Discovery Channel/Investigation Discovery)
- Jessica Wright – Family Renovation – Working Without Windows (Ocean Entertainment)

== Best Direction in a Reality Program or Series ==
- Ihor Macijiwsky – Mantracker – Andrew & Hainsley (Bonterra Productions)
- Grant Greschuk – The Cupcake Girls – Are We Having Fun Yet? (Force Four Entertainment)
- Matt Hoos – Love It or List It – The Smout Family (Big Coat Productions)
- Rae Upton – Canada's Next Top Model – Rockin’ the Runway (Temple Street Productions)

== Best Direction in an Animated Program or Series ==
- Ken Cunningham – Glenn Martin, DDS – The Tooth Will Set You Free (Cuppa Coffee Studios/Tornante Animation/Rogers Communications)
- Robin Budd – Producing Parker – Eat, Pray, Parker – Mercury Filmworks/Breakthrough Entertainment/Philippine Animators Group/Canwest/Shaw Media)
- Trevor Cameron – Wapos Bay – The Hardest Lesson (Karma Film)
- Faruk Cemalovic – Stoked – O Broseph, Where Art Thou? (Fresh TV/Marblemedia)
- Johnny Darrell, Clint Butler – Hot Wheels Battle Force 5 – Junkyard Dogged (Mattel/Nelvana/Nerd Corps Entertainment)

== Best Direction in a Children's or Youth Program or Series ==
- Stefan Brogren – Degrassi: The Next Generation – Beat It (Bell Media/Epitome Pictures)
- Phil Earnshaw – Degrassi: The Next Generation – Just Can't Get Enough (Bell Media/Epitome Pictures)
- Liz Haines – The Ocean Room – Shorter Circuits (Sinking Ship Entertainment)
- John May – How to Be Indie – How to Trick Your Parents into Treating you Like a Grown Up Heroic Television/Sudden Storm Entertainment/Decode Entertainment)
- Craig Pryce – Family Biz – Shake the Box (Muse Entertainment/Summit Crescent Productions/Breakout Films)

== Best Direction in a Live Sporting Event ==
- Paul Hemming – 2010 World Junior Ice Hockey Championships Gold Medal Game (TSN)
- Paul Hemming, Richard Wells – Vancouver 2010 Olympic Winter Games – Gold Medal Men's Hockey Game (TSN)
- Ron Forsythe – Hockey Night in Canada – Stanley Cup Finals – Game 7 (Pittsburgh at Detroit) (CBC Sports)
- Chris Elias – 2010 Canadian Figure Skating Championships (CBC Sports)

== Best Writing in a Dramatic Program or Mini-Series ==
- Jennifer Holness, Sudz Sutherland – Guns – (CBC/Hungry Eyes Media/Peace Arch Entertainment)
- Tim Cherry – Keep Your Head Up, Kid: The Don Cherry Story (Entertainment One/Blue Coach Productions)
- John Krizanc – The Summit (Shaftesbury Films/Media Headquarters)
- Leah McLaren – Abroad (Capture Entertainment/Big Tree Productions)
- Moze Mossanen – Nureyev (Mossanen Productions)
- Nick Willing – Alice (Reunion Pictures/Studio Eight Productions/RHI Entertainment)

== Best Writing in a Dramatic Series ==
- Jeremy Boxen – Cra$h & Burn – Sunday Bloody Sunday (Investigation Productions/Whizbang Films)
- Philip Bedard, Larry Lalonde – Murdoch Mysteries – Hangman (Shaftesbury Films/Rogers Media/UKTV)
- Mark Haroun – Heartland – The Haunting of Hanley Barn (Seven24 Films/Dynamo Films)
- Alex Levine – The Border – Missing in Action (White Pine Pictures)
- Ian Weir – Flashpoint – The Fortress (Pink Sky Entertainment/Avamar Entertainment)

== Best Writing in a Comedy or Variety Program or Series ==
- Marvin Kaye, Chris Sheasgreen – Less Than Kind – Third Death’s The Charm (Breakthrough Entertainment/Buffalo Gal Pictures)
- Jarett Cale, Geoff Lapaire – Pure Pwnage – The Day the Lan Centre Stood Still (TV For Noobs Productions/ROFLMAO Productions/Sphinx Productions/Duopoly)
- Jenn Engels – Less Than Kind – Fatso Loves Lesbo (Breakthrough Entertainment/Buffalo Gal Pictures)
- Rick Green, Duncan McKenzie – History Bites – The Filthy Stinking Rich (History Channel)
- Bruce McCulloch, Dave Foley – The Kids in the Hall: Death Comes to Town – Dead Man Walking (Accent-Kith Productions)

== Best Writing in a Children's or Youth's Program or Series ==
- Trevor Cameron – Wapos Bay – The Hardest Lesson (Karma Film)
- Sheila Dinsmore, John De Klein – Busytown Mysteries – The Sandcastle Squasher, The Strange Ski Tracks Mystery (Cookie Jar Group)
- Scott Fellows – Johnny Test – Papa Johnny, The Johnnyminster Dog Show (Cookie Jar Group)
- Myra Fried, Steve Wright – Majority Rules! – Becky Takes A Pass (Entertainment One)
- Gary Pearson, Duncan McKenzie, Jerry Schaefer, Carolyn Taylor – That's So Weird! – Background Music (Halifax Film Company)

== Best Writing in an Information Program or Series ==
- Douglas Hudema – Hell on Hooves – Innisfail (Juxtapose Productions)
- Bryan Grahn, Kevin Newman – Global National (Global News)
- Michael Prini – Sarah's House – Living Room (HGTV)
- Hana Gartner – the fifth estate – Earl Jones: In Trust (CBC)
- Bob McKeown – the fifth estate – Death Online (CBC)

== Best Writing in a Documentary Program or Series ==
- Eric Bednarski, Barry Cowling – The Strangest Dream (NFB)
- Scott Harper – Philanthropy Inc. (Castlewood Productions)
- Vladimir Kabelik – So Far From Home (Willing Mind Productions)
- Susan Teskey – Love, Hate and Propaganda – Selling the War (CBC)
- John Walker – Passage (NFB/PTV Productions/John Walker Productions)

== Best Editorial Research ==
- Lynette Fortune – the fifth estate – Out Of Control (CBC)
- Claude Berrardelli – Love, Hate and Propaganda – Truth and Total War (CBC)
- Lisa Ellenwood – Love, Hate and Propaganda – Hiding the Horrors (CBC)
- David Ridgen – Canadian Cold Case: The Bomb That Killed Wayne Greavette (CBC News)
- Daniel Thomson, Nancy Carter – Hangman's Graveyard (Ballinran Entertainment)

== Best Performance by an Actor in a Leading Role in a Dramatic Program or Mini-Series ==
- Jared Keeso – Keep Your Head Up, Kid: The Don Cherry Story (Entertainment One/Blue Coach Productions)
- K.C. Collins – Guns – (CBC/Hungry Eyes Media/Peace Arch Entertainment)
- Bruce Greenwood – The Summit (Shaftesbury Films/Media Headquarters)
- Andrew-Lee Potts – Alice (Reunion Pictures/Studio Eight Productions/RHI Entertainment)
- Peter Outerbridge – Deadliest Sea (Original Productions/Working On The Edge Productions)

== Best Performance by an Actress in a Leading Role in a Dramatic Program or Mini-Series ==
- Sun Li – Iron Road (Mainland Productions/CBC)
- Liane Balaban – Abroad (Capture Entertainment/Big Tree Productions)
- Caterina Scorsone – Alice (Reunion Pictures/Studio Eight Productions/RHI Entertainment)

== Best Performance by an Actor in a Continuing Leading Dramatic Role ==
- Robert Carlyle – Stargate Universe – Human (Acme Shark Productions/MGM Television)
- Louis Ferreira – Stargate Universe – Justice (Acme Shark Productions/MGM Television)
- Allan Hawco – Republic of Doyle – The Fall of the Republic (Fireworks Entertainment/Take the Shot Productions)
- Luke Kirby – Cra$h & Burn – Closure (Investigation Productions/Whizbang Films)
- Michael Riley – Being Erica – Being Dr. Tom (Temple Street Productions)

== Best Performance by an Actress in a Continuing Leading Dramatic Role ==
- Caroline Cave – Cra$h & Burn – Forget to Remember (Investigation Productions/Whizbang Films)
- Lynda Boyd – Republic of Doyle – He Sleeps With the Chips (Fireworks Entertainment/Take the Shot Productions)
- Hélène Joy – Durham County – Little Lost Children (Muse Entertainment/Back Alley Film Productions)
- Grace Park – The Border – Hate Metal (White Pine Pictures)
- Victoria Snow – Paradise Falls – Following Orders (Breakthrough Entertainment)

== Best Performance by an Actor in a Guest Role, Dramatic Series ==
- Michael Riley – Flashpoint – Coming to You Live (Pink Sky Entertainment/Avamar Entertainment)
- Enrico Colantoni – Cra$h & Burn – Lawyers Guns & Money (Investigation Productions/Whizbang Films)
- Christopher Heyerdahl – Sanctuary – Haunted (My Plastic Badger Productions)
- Hugh Thompson – Flashpoint – Business As Usual (Pink Sky Entertainment/Avamar Entertainment)
- Kristopher Turner – Bloodletting & Miraculous Cures – Family Practice (Shaftesbury Films)

== Best Performance by an Actress in a Guest Role Dramatic Series ==
- Tatiana Maslany – Bloodletting & Miraculous Cures – All Souls (Shaftesbury Films)
- Ona Grauer – Flashpoint – The Fortress (Pink Sky Entertainment/Avamar Entertainment)
- Laurence Leboeuf – Flashpoint – The Perfect Family (Pink Sky Entertainment/Avamar Entertainment)
- Debra Lynne McCabe – Bloodletting & Miraculous Cures – All Souls (Shaftesbury Films)
- Anastasia Phillips – Murdoch Mysteries – Me, Myself, & Murdoch (Shaftesbury Films/Rogers Media/UKTV)

== Best Performance by an Actor in a Featured Supporting Role in a Dramatic Series ==
- Clé Bennett – The Line – Episodes 203 & 206 (The Nightingale Company)
- Sergio Di Zio – Flashpoint – Flashpoint – One Wrong Move, The Good Citizen (Pink Sky Entertainment/Avamar Entertainment)
- Genadijs Dolganovs – The Bridge – Painted Ladies, Chain of Fools (Entertainment One)
- Sebastian Pigott – Being Erica – Yes We Can, The Unkindest Cut (Temple Street Productions)
- Mark Taylor – Flashpoint – One Wrong Move, Exit Wounds (Pink Sky Entertainment/Avamar Entertainment)

== Best Performance by an Actress in a Featured Supporting Role in a Dramatic Series ==
- Catherine Disher – The Border – The Dead, Dark Ride (White Pine Pictures)
- Eve Harlow – The Guard – Boom, Last Night (Brightlight Pictures/Halifax Film Company)
- Reagan Pasternak – Being Erica – Shhh...Don't Tell, Under My Thumb (Temple Street Productions)
- Jessica Steen – Flashpoint – Clean Hands, The Perfect Family (Pink Sky Entertainment/Avamar Entertainment)
- Rachel Wilson – Republic of Doyle – Return of the Grievous Angel, Blood is Thicker Than Blood (Fireworks Entertainment/Take the Shot Productions)

== Best Performance by an Actor in a Featured Supporting Role in a Dramatic Program or Mini-Series ==
- Clé Bennett – Guns – (CBC/Hungry Eyes Media/Peace Arch Entertainment)
- Greg Bryk – Deadliest Sea (Original Productions/Working On The Edge Productions)
- Colm Feore – Guns – (CBC/Hungry Eyes Media/Peace Arch Entertainment)
- Matt Frewer – Alice (Reunion Pictures/Studio Eight Productions/RHI Entertainment)
- Christopher Plummer – The Summit (Shaftesbury Films/Media Headquarters)
- Vincent Walsh – The Good Times Are Killing Me (Shaftesbury Films)

== Best Performance by an Actress in a Featured Supporting Role in a Dramatic Program or Mini-Series ==
- Debra Lynne McCabe – Guns – (CBC/Hungry Eyes Media/Peace Arch Entertainment)
- Wendy Crewson – The Summit (Shaftesbury Films/Media Headquarters)
- Sarah Manninen – Keep Your Head Up, Kid: The Don Cherry Story (Entertainment One/Blue Coach Productions)

== Best Individual Performance in a Comedy Program or Series ==
- Benjamin Arthur – Less Than Kind – That’s Somebody’s Knish! (Breakthrough Entertainment/Buffalo Gal Pictures)
- Lisa Durupt – Less Than Kind – Road Trip (Breakthrough Entertainment/Buffalo Gal Pictures)
- Wendel Meldrum – Less Than Kind – I Am Somewhere (Breakthrough Entertainment/Buffalo Gal Pictures)
- Rick Mercer – Rick Mercer Report – Episode 1 (CBC/Island Edge)
- Pete Zedlacher – Just for Laughs Gala Series 2009, Show 1 (Just for Laughs Comedy Festival/Les Films Rozon)

== Best Ensemble Performance in a Comedy Program or Series ==
- Shaun Majumder, Gavin Crawford, Mark Critch, Geri Hall, Cathy Jones – This Hour Has 22 Minutes, Episode 8 (Halifax Film Company/CBC)
- Kenny Hotz, Spencer Rice – Kenny vs. Spenny – Who Can 69 The Longest? (CBC/Cinefornia/Blueprint Entertainment/Eggplant Picture & Sound/KVS Productions)
- Peter Keleghan, Erin Agostino, Carl Alacchi, Angela Asher, Ellen David, Stacey Farber, Al Goulem, Kaniehtiio Horn, Jesse Rath, Michael Seater, Arielle Shiri – 18 To Life – Goy Story (CBC)

== Best Performance or Host in a Variety Program or Series (Individual or Ensemble) ==
- Michael Bublé – At The Concert Hall – Michael Bublé at the Concert Hall
- Classified – Juno Awards of 2010 (Canadian Academy of Recording Arts and Sciences/Insight Productions)
- K'naan – Juno Awards of 2010 (Canadian Academy of Recording Arts and Sciences/Insight Productions)
- Kurt Browning – Battle of the Blades – Frank Sinatra (Insight Productions)
- Leah Miller – So You Think You Can Dance Canada – Montreal & Edmonton Auditions (Danse TV Productions)

== Best Performance in a Performing Arts Program or Series (Individual or Ensemble) ==
- Evan Alexander Smith – Hot Toxic Love: The Making of The Toxic Avenger Musical (Citytv)
- Nico Archambault – Nureyev (Mossanen Productions)
- Louise Pitre – Hot Toxic Love: The Making of The Toxic Avenger Musical (Citytv)

== Best Performance in an Animated Program or Series ==
- Kim Cattrall – Producing Parker – The Skinny on Parker – Mercury Filmworks/Breakthrough Entertainment/Philippine Animators Group/Canwest/Shaw Media)
- Kristin Booth – Producing Parker – The Skinny on Parker – Mercury Filmworks/Breakthrough Entertainment/Philippine Animators Group/Canwest/Shaw Media)
- Seán Cullen – Jimmy Two Shoes – Wish You Weren't Here (Mercury Filmworks/Breakthrough Entertainment)
- Cory Doran – Jimmy Two-Shoes – Rear Pickle (Mercury Filmworks/Breakthrough Entertainment)
- DerRic Starlight – Wapos Bay – It Came from Out There (Karma Film)

== Best Performance in a Children’s or Youth Program or Series ==
- Charlotte Arnold – Degrassi: The Next Generation – Somebody (Bell Media/Epitome Pictures)
- Landon Liboiron – Degrassi: The Next Generation – Waiting For a Girl Like You (Bell Media/Epitome Pictures)
- Kayla Lorette – That's So Weird! – Leaky Roof (Halifax Film Company)
- Melinda Shankar – How to Be Indie – How to Beat Father Time Heroic Television/Sudden Storm Entertainment/Decode Entertainment)
- Jamie Watson – Peep and the Big Wide World – Magic Duck Dancing, Chirp Chirp, Tweet, Tweet, Chirp (WGBH-TV/9 Story Media Group/TVOntario/Discovery Kids)

== Best Achievement in Casting ==
- John Buchan, Jason Knight – The Summit (Shaftesbury Films/Media Headquarters)
- Deirdre Bowen – Bloodletting & Miraculous Cures – All Souls (Shaftesbury Films)
- Stephanie Gorin – Guns – (CBC/Hungry Eyes Media/Peace Arch Entertainment)
- Andrea Kenyon, Wendy O'Brien, Marissa Richmond, Randi Wells – Durham County – Little Lost Children (Muse Entertainment/Back Alley Film Productions)
- Marissa Richmond – Flashpoint – Perfect Storm (Pink Sky Entertainment/Avamar Entertainment)

== Best News Anchor ==
- Diana Swain – CBC News: Toronto at Six (CBC)
- Ian Hanomansing – CBC News Vancouver (CBC)
- Peter Mansbridge – The National/CBC News (CBC)

== Best Breaking News Reportage, Local ==
- Brian DuBreuil, Steve Lawrence – CBC News Nova Scotia at 6:00, April 30 – May 1 2009 (CBC)
- Cynthia Mulligan – CityNews – Lightning Strikes (Citytv)
- Sheila North – CBC News Winnipeg – Homeless Rescue, Homeless Hero, Rescue Reunion (CBC)
- Pamela Seatle – CityNews – Garbage Strike (Citytv)
- Judy Trinh, Neil Carroll – CBC News Ottawa – Crematorium Fallout (CBC)

== Best Breaking News Reportage, National ==
- Paul Hunter, Bill Loucks – CBC News CBC News: CBC News: The National (CBC)
- Nahlah Ayed, Pascal Leblond, Stephanie Jenzer – CBC News: The National (CBC)
- Paul Johnson, Mike Drolet, Elias Campbell – Global National (Global News)
- Susan Ormiston, Andy Hincenbergs – CBC News: The National (CBC)

== Best Host or Interviewer in a News Information Program or Series ==
- Amanda Lang – The Lang & O'Leary Exchange (CBC)
- Heather Hiscox – CBC News Now (CBC)
- Erica Johnson – Marketplace (CBC)
- Bob McKeown – the fifth estate (CBC)
- Evan Solomon – Power and Politics (CBC)

== Best Host or Interviewer in a General/Human Interest or Talk Program or Series ==
- George Stroumboulopoulos – The Hour with George Stroumboulopoulos (CBC)
- Adam Growe – Cash Cab – Episode 210 (Castlewood Productions)
- Don Kelly – Fish Out of Water – Polynesian Cultural Centre, The Samoan Village (InterINDigital Entertainment/Joe Media Group)
- Paul McGuire – One On One (CMT)
- Ed Robertson – Ed's Up – Atlanta Journalist Abduction Course (Peace Point Entertainment Group

== Best Host in a Lifestyle/Practical Information, or Performing Arts Program or Series ==
- Sarah Richardson – Sarah's House (HGTV)
- Lynn Crawford – Pitchin' In – Shrimp (Frantic Films)
- Chuck Hughes – Chuck's Day Off – My Toughest Critics (Whalley-Abbey Media)
- Jay Manuel – Canada's Next Top Model – A Warm Safe Place (Temple Street Productions)
- Kristina Matisic, Anna Wallner – Anna & Kristina's Grocery Bag – Cowboy in the Kitchen (Worldwide Bag Media)

== Best Host in a Pre-School, Children's or Youth Program or Series ==
- Patty Sullivan – Kids Canada (CBC)
- Mark Sykes – Mark’s Moments – Alexandre Baronette (TVOntario)
- Adamo Ruggiero – The Next Star – Edmonton, Vancouver (Tricon Films & Television)
- Evan Solomon – Canada's Super Speller – Episode 104 (Halifax Film Company)

== Best Host or Interviewer in a Sports Program or Sportscast ==
- Brian Williams – Vancouver 2010 Olympic Winter Games (TSN)
- James Duthie – TSN Trade Centre 2010 (TSN)
- Ron MacLean – Tim Horton's Hockey Day in Canada (CBC)
- Scott Russell – 2010 Canadian Figure Skating Championships (CBC Sports)

== Best Sportscaster/Anchor ==
- James Duthie – Vancouver 2010 Olympic Winter Games (TSN)
- Shane Foxman – CBC News Vancouver (CBC)
- Jay Onrait – SportsCentre (TSN)
- Brian Williams – Vancouver 2010 Olympic Winter Games (TSN)

== Best Sports Play-by-Play Announcer ==
- Chris Cuthbert – Vancouver 2010 Olympic Winter Games – Men’s Gold Medal Hockey (TSN)
- Chris Cuthbert – 2009 Grey Cup (TSN)
- Rod Smith – Vancouver 2010 Olympic Winter Games – Long-Track Speed Skating (TSN)

== Best Sports Analyst ==
- Catriona Le May Doan – Vancouver 2010 Olympic Winter Games (TSN)
- Glen Suitor – 2009 Grey Cup (TSN)
- Ray Turnbull – 2010 Tim Hortons Brier (TSN)

== Best Sports Reporting ==
- Darren Dreger – SportsCentre – Firing of NHLPA Paul Kelly (TSN)
- James Cybulski – Vancouver 2010 Olympic Winter Games (TSN)
- Elliotte Friedman' – Hockey Night In Canada – 2010 Winter Classic, Philadelphia at Boston (CBC)

== Best Photography in a Dramatic Program or Series ==
- Glen MacPherson – Keep Your Head Up, Kid: The Don Cherry Story (Entertainment One/Blue Coach Productions)
- James Jeffrey – Murdoch Mysteries – The Murdoch Identity (Shaftesbury Films/Rogers Media/UKTV)
- Jim Menard – Stargate Universe – Light (Acme Shark Productions/MGM Television)
- Stephen Reizes – Flashpoint – Behind the Blue Line (Pink Sky Entertainment/Avamar Entertainment)
- Michael Storey – Republic of Doyle – The Fall of the Republic (Fireworks Entertainment/Take the Shot Productions)

== Best Photography in a Comedy Program or Series ==
- Paul Sarossy – The Kids in the Hall: Death Comes to Town – Cause of Death (Accent-Kith Productions)
- Marc Charlebois – 18 To Life – No Strings Attached (CBC)
- Anton Krawczyk – Hiccups – You Schmooze, You Lose (Penflo Productions, Sparrow Media, CTV)
- Don Spence – Rick Mercer Report – Episode 9 (CBC/Island Edge)

== Best Photography in a Variety or Performing Arts Program or Series ==
- Dylan Macleod – Nureyev (Mossanen Productions)
- Alex Nadon – Juno Awards of 2010 (Canadian Academy of Recording Arts and Sciences/Insight Productions)
- Alex Nadon – Battle of the Blades – Finale (Insight Productions)
- Jean Renaud, Vincent Colbert – So You Think You Can Dance Canada – Finale (Danse TV Productions)

== Best Photography in an Information Program or Series ==
- Henry Less – French Food at Home – Confidence Builders (Ocean Entertainment)
- Andre Dupuis – Departures – Ethiopia: Saints and Snakes
- Ihor Macijiwsky, Kurt Carpenter, Lawrence Foster, Mike Schaffel – Mantracker – Jessica & Lauren (Bonterra Productions)
- Stefan Randström – Which Way To...Arviat (Which Way To Productions)
- Steven Tsushima – Holmes Inspection – A Hole Lot of History (The Holmes Group)

== Best Photography in a Documentary Program or Series ==
- Matt Phillips – Silent Bombs: All For the Motherland (4 Square Productions Canada)
- Jeremy Benning – Manson (Cineflix)
- Jeremy Benning – The Great Sperm Race (Cream Productions/Blink Entertainment)
- Geoff Lackner – The Plastic Fantastic Brain: Total Recall and the Spotless Mind (Stornoway Communications)
- Ian Toews – Saskatchewan River Delta (291 Film Company)

== Best Visual Effects ==
- Mario Rachiele, Marie-Ève Bédard-Tremblay, Benoît Brière, Raphaël Hubert, Pierre-Simon Lebrun-Chaput – Ben Hur (Alchemy Television Group/Drimtim Entertainment/Muse Entertainment)
- Laurence Cymet, George Levai, Paul Moyer, Ila Soleimani – Dino Dan – Copy Dino, He Shoots, He Roars (Sinking Ship Entertainment)
- Robert Munroe, Bret Culp, Maria Gordon, Bill Halliday, Adam Jewett, Kyle Menzies, Bo Mosley, Patrik Witzmann – The Tudors, Episode 303 (Peace Arch Entertainment/Reveille Productions/Working Title Films/Showtime Networks)
- Mario Rachiele, Marie-Ève Bédard-Tremblay, Benoît Brière, Raphaël Hubert, Jean-Francois Lafleur, Benjamin Ribière, Philippe Sylvain – Carny (Muse Entertainment/RHI Entertainment)
- Mark Savela, Brenda Campbell, Shannon Gurney, Vivian Jim, Andrew Karr, Michael Lowes, Kodie MacKenzie, Krista McLean, Alec McClymont, Craig Vandenbiggelaar – Stargate Universe – Air Part 1 (Acme Shark Productions/MGM Television)

== Best Visual Research ==
- Elizabeth Klinck, Laura Blaney – Reel Injun (Rezolution Pictures/NFB/CBC)
- Zoë Barraclough, Mia Webster – Love, Hate and Propaganda – Truth and Total War (CBC)
- Gina Cali – One Ocean – Birth of an Ocean (Merit Motion Pictures)
- Ron Krant, Darren Yearsley – Love, Hate and Propaganda – Selling the War (CBC)
- Suzan Yum – The Naked Archaeologist – Biblical Beauty Secrets (Associated Producers)

== Best Picture Editing in a Dramatic Program or Series ==
- Jeff Warren – Guns – (CBC/Hungry Eyes Media/Peace Arch Entertainment)
- Rick Martin – Stargate Universe – Human (Acme Shark Productions/MGM Television)
- Lara Mazur – Flashpoint – One Wrong Move (Pink Sky Entertainment/Avamar Entertainment)
- Vesna Svilanović – Bloodletting & Miraculous Cures – Unhappy Endings (Shaftesbury Films)
- Arthur Tarnowski – The Phantom (Muse Entertainment/RHI Entertainment)

== Best Picture Editing in a Comedy, Variety, Performing Arts Program or Series ==
- Jason Gatt – Fire Jammers (Yap Films)
- Jeff Bessner – Nureyev (Mossanen Productions)
- Benjamin Duffield – 18 To Life – Goy Story (CBC)
- Peter Hordylan, Owin Lambeck, Eric Abboud, James Osso – So You Think You Can Dance Canada – Toronto Auditions (Danse TV Productions)
- Arthur Tarnowski – 18 To Life – Hanging Pictures (CBC)

== Best Picture Editing in an Information Program or Series ==
- Jeff Reynolds, Jay Prychidny – Canada's Next Top Model – Rockin’ the Runway (Temple Street Productions)
- Josh Eady – Departures – Russia: The Bull of Winter
- Jordan Krug – Departures – Papua New Guinea: Fire and Water
- Bruce LaPointe – Sid The Kid v. Alexander the Great (90th Parallel Productions)
- Jonathon Stewart – Mantracker – Rene & Dave (Bonterra Productions)

== Best Picture Editing in a Documentary Program or Series ==
- Sharon Zupancic – Mayday – Lockerbie Disaster (Cineflix)
- Pavel Chichagov, Chris Mullington – The Quantum Tamers: Revealing our Weird and Wired Future (Title Entertainment)
- Barry McMann – Convoy: War For The Atlantic (Darlow Smithson Productions)
- Deanna Scriver, Marco Porsia – The Plastic Fantastic Brain: Total Recall and the Spotless Mind (Stornoway Communications)
- Steve Weslak – Empire of the Word – Forbidden Reading (TVOntario)

== Best Production Design or Art Direction in a Non-Fiction Program or Series ==
- Michael Spike Parks – 2009 MuchMusic Video Awards (CTVglobemedia)
- Jon Arklay, Patrick Larsen – Vancouver 2010 Olympic Winter Games (CTV)
- Anne Brahic – Spectacle: Elvis Costello with... – Herbie Hancock (Prospero Pictures/Reinvention Entertainment/Rocket Pictures/Tri-Fi Productions/Chatting Glasses/SpyBox Pictures)
- Callum MacLachlan, Lela Kouyoumdjian, Jason Ray – Canada's Next Top Model – Rockin’ the Runway (Temple Street Productions)
- Terry O'Neill, Sang-Mi Jeon, Beth Mally – Love, Hate and Propaganda – Truth and Total War (CBC)

== Best Production Design or Art Direction in a Fiction Program or Series ==
- Tom Conroy, Colman Corish – The Tudors, Episode 302 (Peace Arch Entertainment/Reveille Productions/Working Title Films/Showtime Networks)
- Jacques Bradette – Deadliest Sea (Original Productions/Working On The Edge Productions)
- Linda Del Rosario – Iron Road (Mainland Productions/CBC)
- Sandra Kybartas – Bloodletting & Miraculous Cures – All Souls (Shaftesbury Films)
- Rejean Labrie – Keep Your Head Up, Kid: The Don Cherry Story (Entertainment One/Blue Coach Productions)

== Best Achievement in Main Title Design ==
- Kevin Chandoo – Durham County – Little Lost Children (Muse Entertainment/Back Alley Film Productions)
- Peter Gentile, Mikey Lalonde – Clubland (MDF Productions)
- Trevor Hembrey, Ian Tucker, Adam Shaheen – Less Than Kind (Breakthrough Entertainment/Buffalo Gal Pictures)
- Shane Kinnear, Kevin Chandoo, Sam Komaromi, Brent Whitmore – The Listener (Shaftesbury Films)
- Shane Kinnear, Kevin Chandoo, Tim Dormady, Sam Komaromi – Bloodletting & Miraculous Cures – How to Get Ahead in Medical School (Shaftesbury Films)

== Best Costume Design ==
- Joan Bergin – The Tudors, Episode 307 (Peace Arch Entertainment/Reveille Productions/Working Title Films/Showtime Networks)
- Debra Hanson – Cra$h & Burn – Til Death (Investigation Productions/Whizbang Films)
- Patti Henderson – Keep Your Head Up, Kid: The Don Cherry Story (Entertainment One/Blue Coach Productions)
- Luis Sequeira – Being Erica – Shhh...Don't Tell (Temple Street Productions)
- Angus Strathie – Alice (Reunion Pictures/Studio Eight Productions/RHI Entertainment)

== Best Achievement in Make-Up ==
- Eva Coudouloux, Adrien Morot – Durham County – Surviving the Fall (Muse Entertainment/Back Alley Film Productions)
- Debi Drennan, Regan Noble – Murdoch Mysteries – Blood & Circuses (Shaftesbury Films/Rogers Media/UKTV)
- Shauna Llewellyn, Carmela Dos Santos – The Summit (Shaftesbury Films/Media Headquarters)
- Lisa Love, Paul Edwards – Alice (Reunion Pictures/Studio Eight Productions/RHI Entertainment)
- Geralyn Wraith, Allan Cooke, Judi Cooper-Sealy, David Scott – The Kids in the Hall: Death Comes to Town – Who Mailed Our Mayor? (Accent-Kith Productions)

== Best Sound in a Dramatic Program ==
- John Gare, Rob Bertola, Alan deGraaf, Steve Hammond, Bill McMillan, Jill Purdy, Richard Calistan – The Good Times Are Killing Me (Shaftesbury Films)
- Steven Gurman, Matthew Cerantola, Scott Donald, Jean-Philippe Espantoso, David Gertsman, Paul Hubert, Eric Lagacé, Stan Sakellaropoulos – Ben Hur (Alchemy Television Group/Drimtim Entertainment/Muse Entertainment)
- Kirby Jinnah, David Cyr, James Fonnyadt, Graeme Hughes, Iain Pattison, Paul Sharpe, James Wallace, Rich Walters – Riverworld (Reunion Pictures)

== Best Sound in a Dramatic Series ==
- John Douglas Smith, Tom Bjelic, Christian Cooke, Dale Lennon, Steve Moore, Tim O’Connell – Being Erica – The Unkindest Cut (Temple Street Productions)
- Yann Cleary, Keith Elliott, Brad Thornton, Jill Purdy, Stephen Barden, Steve Baine – Durham County – Ray Loves (Muse Entertainment/Back Alley Film Productions)
- Sadie True, Kelly Cole, Jacqueline Cristianini, Kris Fenske, Bill Mellow, Steve Smith, Kevin Townshend, Joe Watts, Matt Wilson – The Guard – At Sea (Brightlight Pictures/Halifax Film Company)
- Kelly Cole, Jay Cheetham, Kirby Jinnah, Bill Mellow, Patrick Ramsay, Steve Smith, Joe Watts, Matt Wilson – Stargate Universe – Air Part 1 (Acme Shark Productions/MGM Television)
- Hugo de la Cerda, Kevin Belen, Kirby Jinnah, Ryan Nowak, Mike Paprocki, Jean Tejkel, Kevin Townshend, Kevin Sands – Sanctuary – End of Nights (My Plastic Badger Productions)
- John Gare, Richard Calistan, Dan Daniels, Alan deGraaf, Steve Hammond, Janice Ierulli, Mark Shnuriwsky – Bloodletting & Miraculous Cures – Unhappy Endings (Shaftesbury Films)

== Best Sound in a Comedy, Variety, or Performing Arts Program or Series ==
- Simon Bowers, Howard Baggley, Marc Laliberté, Doug McClement, Michael Molineux – Juno Awards of 2010 (Canadian Academy of Recording Arts and Sciences/Insight Productions)
- Roberto Capretta, Rob Turi, Colin Van Hattem – Hotbox (The Comedy Network/S&S Productions)
- Anthony Montano, Steven Budd, Phil Hay, Bob Rock – At The Concert Hall – Michael Bublé at the Concert Hall
- Francesco Russo, Dave Harrison – Johnny Reid: Live at the Jubilee (Country Wide Productions, CMT)
- Lou Solakofski, Steve Baine, Barry Gilmore, Michael Lacroix, Robert Warchol – The Kids in the Hall: Death Comes to Town – Death Checks In (Accent-Kith Productions)

== Best Sound in an Information/Documentary Program or Series ==
- Jo Rossi – Ice Pilots NWT – The Crash (Omnifilm Entertainment)
- Steph Carrier, Brian Hanish, Steve Medeiros – Clubland (MDF Productions)
- Cary Ciesielski, Lucas Hart, David J. Taylor – Saskatchewan River Delta (291 Film Company)
- Edward Krupa, Shaun Firth – Empire of the Word – The Future of Reading (TVOntario)
- Ron Searles, Rodrigue Amyot, Alan Geldart – Love, Hate and Propaganda – Selling the War (CBC)
- J. Martin Taylor, Jamie Mahaffey – Darwin's Brave New World – Publish and Be Damned (Ferns Productions/Screenworld)

== Best Original Music Score for a Program or Series ==
- Trevor Morris – The Tudors, Episode 304 (Peace Arch Entertainment/Reveille Productions/Working Title Films/Showtime Networks)
- Amin Bhatia, Ari Posner – Flashpoint – One Wrong Move (Pink Sky Entertainment/Avamar Entertainment)
- Robert Carli – Bloodletting & Miraculous Cures – Isolation (Shaftesbury Films)
- Robert Carli – Murdoch Mysteries – Me, Myself, & Murdoch (Shaftesbury Films/Rogers Media/UKTV)
- Joel Goldsmith – Stargate Universe – Light (Acme Shark Productions/MGM Television)
- James Jandrisch – The Guard – At Sea (Brightlight Pictures/Halifax Film Company)

== Best Original Music for a Dramatic Program, Mini-Series or TV Movie ==
- Tom Third – The Summit (Shaftesbury Films/Media Headquarters)
- Christopher Dedrick – The Good Times Are Killing Me (Shaftesbury Films)
- Kenny Neal Jr., Mischa Chillak – Guns – (CBC/Hungry Eyes Media/Peace Arch Entertainment)
- Lawrence Shragge – Iron Road (Mainland Productions/CBC)

== Best Original Music Score for a Documentary Program or Series ==
- Philip Strong – Cat Ladies (Chocolate Box Entertainment)
- Ramachandra Borcar – Karsh Is History (Productions Grand Nord)
- Claude Castonguay, Mona Laviolette – Reel Injun (Rezolution Pictures/NFB/CBC)
- Jim McGrath – Empire of the Word – The Magic of Reading (TVOntario)
- Shawn Pierce – The Secret World of Shoplifting (CBC)

== Best Original Music for a Lifestyle/Practical Information or Reality Program or Series ==
- Serge Côté – A World of Wonders – On Puffin Patrol: Iceland (Genuine Pictures)
- David Burns – The Restaurant Adventures of Caroline & Dave – The Last Straw (Mountain Road Productions)
- Richard Evans – Rescue Mediums: Rockside – The Shape of Things to Come (Lamport-Sheppard Entertainment)
- Michael O'Neill – French Food at Home – Confidence Builders (Ocean Entertainment)
- Jamie Shields, Dave Wall, Adam White – The Cupcake Girls – Out With The Old, In With The New (Force Four Entertainment)
- Ken Whiteley – Love Letters (Triptych Media)

== Best Original Music Score for an Animated Program or Series ==
- Jonathan Evans, Gerard Tevlin – Guess with Jess – How Can We Decorate the Christmas Tree? (Nelvana/Classic Media)
- Brian Carson – Hot Wheels Battle Force 5 – Mag Wheels (Mattel/Nelvana/Nerd Corps Entertainment)
- Ross Nykiforuk – Wapos Bay – The Hardest Lesson (Karma Film)

== The Gemini Top 25 ==
The Gemini Awards asked the public to vote for their favourite programs that aired during the Gemini Awards’ 25 years of existence. The results were:

- 1. Degrassi
- 2. Flashpoint
- 3. Mr. Dressup
- 4. Anne of Green Gables
- 5. Durham County
- 6. Holmes on Homes
- 7. Due South
- 8. Being Erica
- 9. Corner Gas
- 10. The Friendly Giant
- 11. The Beachcombers
- 12. Trailer Park Boys
- 13. The Kids in the Hall
- 14. Rick Mercer Report
- 15. North of 60
- 16. This Hour Has 22 Minutes
- 17. Wayne and Shuster
- 18. Made in Canada
- 19. Slings & Arrows
- 20. Da Vinci’s Inquest
- 21. CODCO
- 22. The Nature of Things
- 23. Traders
- 24. The NewMusic
- 25. The Newsroom

== Special awards ==
- 2010 Masterworks Honourees:
- Vera Good, Jed MacKay, L. Ted Coneybeare, TVOntario – Polka Dot Door
- John Martin, Moses Znaimer, MuchMusic, Citytv – The NewMusic
- Gemini Award for Outstanding Technical Achievement in Digital Media: Alon Marcovici – CTVOlympics.ca/RDSolympiques.ca, Live Sports Video Stream Player
- Academy Achievement Award: Linda Schuyler
- Canada Award: Christina Fon, Catherine Bainbridge, Linda Ludwick, Ernest Webb – Reel Injun
- Margaret Collier Award: Donald Martin
- Gemini Humanitarian Award: Joy Coghill
