= David Burnet =

David Burnet or Burnett may refer to:

- David G. Burnet (1788–1870), president of the interim government of the Republic of Texas during 1836
- David Burnet (Quebec politician) (c. 1803–1853), businessman and Quebec politician
- David Burnett (photojournalist) (born 1946), American photojournalist
- David Burnett (politician) (born 1942/3), Arkansas politician and former judge
- Dave Burnet (born 1950), Australian rugby union and rugby league footballer
- David Burnett, co-host of the Food Network Canada TV program Man-Made Food
- David Burnett, roofing company owner and candidate for the U.S. House of Representatives in North Carolina in 2010
- Sir David Burnett, 1st Baronet (1851–1930) of the Burnett baronets
- Sir David Humphrey Burnett, 3rd Baronet (1918–2002) of the Burnett baronets

== See also ==
- Burnett (surname)
