= Sarah's Cottage =

Sarah's Cottage may refer to:

- Sarah's Cottage, Isle of Man, a location and a named corner of a road-racing course mainly used for motorcycles.
- Sarah's Cottage (TV series), a Canadian television home renovation show.
