= Duopoly (disambiguation) =

A duopoly is a specific type of oligopoly where only two producers exist in one market.

Duopoly may also refer to:

- Duopoly (broadcasting), in the United States, a single company which owns two or more radio or television stations in the same city or community
- Duopoly (entertainment company), a Canadian film and television production company
- Political duopoly or two-party system, in which only two political parties participate in government
