= To Catch a Killer =

To Catch a Killer may refer to:

- To Catch a Killer (1992 film), an American TV film starring Brian Dennehy
- To Catch a Killer (2023 film), an American crime thriller starring Shailene Woodley and Ben Mendelsohn
- To Catch a Killer (TV series), a 2014 Canadian episodic docudrama
- "To Catch a Killer", a two-part 2008 episode of the British TV drama The Bill
