= Chef at Home =

Canadian cooking reality TV show

Chef at Home is a Canadian cooking reality TV show presented by professionally trained chef Michael Smith. Produced by Ocean Entertainment, it debuted October 5, 2004, on Food Network Canada and in the United States was aired on ION Life until September 17, 2015.

Filmed at the Farmhouse at the Cove home in Prince Edward Island, Chef Michael Smith invites viewers into his home kitchen. The authors of Lifestyle describe the show as a "Culinary Institute of America graduate explains to viewers how to create uncomplicated, tasty meals for family and friends". In each episode Michael inspires home cooks to create meals and plates by choosing flavours and ingredients that naturally go together. Using basic cooking techniques Michael demonstrates simple ways to cook perfect meat and experiments with an array of exotic spices from all over the world. Food Network Canada describes the show as: "Close your cookbooks, look in the fridge, fire your imagination and let your instincts and appetite be your guide!".

Chef at Home was divided into six seasons, composed each of 26 episodes offering recipes from all around the world, inspiring different tastes and referring to some specific plates, suggestions for occasions such as Christmas, Thanksgiving or even Valentine's Day. Some examples of the recipes were, teaching viewers how to cook a Backyard Smoked Salmon (Season 5, episode 2), how to make homemade sushi or how not to miss the cooking of a Tuscan Beef (Season 6, episode 9).

== History ==
Chef at Home was one of the first original programs from Food Network Canada. It started in 2004 alongside other productions such as "Christine Crushing Live" (2004-2007), "Made to Order" (2004-2006), "Recipe for Success" (2004-unknown) and "Man Made Food" (2004-unknown). The show was on the air for five years (until 2009), making it one of the longer original running shows in the history of Food Network Canada alongside "You Gotta Eat Here!" (2012-2017), "Food Factory'' (2012-Present), "Bake with Anna Olson" (2012-Present) and "Top Chef" (2011-Present) that are still on the air today.

After the finalization of the show, the chef Michael Smith started a five-year scholarship for students in the Family and Nutritional Sciences Program at the University of Prince Edward Island. And a year after, in 2010, Smith led the team that cooked for athletes in Whistler, British Columbia during the 2010 Vancouver Olympics.

== Series overview ==
The series focuses on Chef Michael Smith aiming each episode on a different recipe or type of food. Smith promotes a healthy food lifestyle and sustainable home cooking within each episode. In each episode, Smith tries a different recipe but in the format that the audience or viewers feel as if they were inside Smith's home learning as he teaches and talks to the viewer/'guest' as if they were part of the food making process. Smith encourages viewers to improvise and project beyond traditional recipes and learn about the food they cook, all while having a unique experience of creating foods for family and friends.

=== Seasons ===
The show went on for six seasons, and continued airing on television in form of reruns on many life network channels including Food Network, ION Life. Each season consisted about 26 episodes, usually with an assortment of recipes and foods, Smith would focus on usually no more than four recipes.

=== Episodes ===
The series had a total of 157 episodes aired. In each episode, Smith would provide audiences a theme to work with, and offer a maximum of seven recipes to help viewers work towards a sustainable home cooking.

=== Specials ===
Often throughout seasons, Chef Michael Smith would include specials that would pertain to the events happening around the times the episode would be airing. Such episodes include a Valentine's Day special (Season 4, Episode 26), 'Game Day' recipes (Season 4, Episode 25), 'Birthday Party' special (Season 4, Episode 18), Halloween special (Season 4, Episode 8), Thanksgiving specials (Season 3, Episode 24 & Season 4, Episode 1), Summer specific recipe special (Season 2, Episode 19), and Christmas special (Season 2, Episode 14).

== Episodes ==
Episodes in each season do not share a common theme. Instead, chef Michael Smith creates mouthwatering masterpieces ranging from "East Coast Chowder" (Season 1, Episode 2) to "Asian Chicken Salad" (Season 3, Episode 15). (Lifestyle, n.d.)

His motto is to "[cook] without a recipe." (Chef at home, 2015). This instills a sense of creativity within people. People are then able to create delicious meals without the stress of following a recipe.

Season	Episodes
1	26
2	27
3	26
4	26
5	26
6	25

== Production details ==
With its filming done from Prince Edward Island, Canada, this Canadian television show was initially and is currently produced by Ocean Entertainment, as this show is listed among others under its "Food Series" catalogue on the producer's website. Among an American audience, the show is also broadcast by Food Network, which allows Canadians to view it as well.

== Awards ==
During the show's run-time, Chef At Home was nominated for, and won, the Gemini Award for Best Direction in a Lifestyle/Practical Information Program or Series in 2006. The Gemini Awards celebrated achievement in Canada's English-language television industry and were presented by the Academy of Canadian Cinema & Television. The episode that won the Gemini Award was called "Hors d'Oeuvres Party."

== Broadcaster ==
Current

- Food Network - original broadcaster
- ION Life

Syndicate

- Asian Food Channel
- Cooking Channel
- LifeStyle Food Australia
- Living Channel New Zealand
