= Michael Andrew Arntfield =

Canadian criminologist and author

Michael Andrew Arntfield is a Canadian academic, author, criminologist, true crime broadcaster and podcaster, a professor at the University of Western Ontario, and a Fulbright scholar. He is also a workplace violence harassment consultant, threat assessor, and former police officer. From 1999 to 2014, Arntfield was employed with the London, Ontario, Police Service as a police officer and detective. In 2014, Arntfield left policing to accept a customized academic appointment at the University of Western Ontario. Today, Arntfield teaches "literary criminology," a term he adopted combined English literature and crime studies program.

== Cold case research ==
In 2011, the same year Arntfield completed his Ph.D., he founded the Cold Case Society. The Cold Case Society at the University of Western Ontario uses students and faculty from multiple disciplines, as well as subject matter experts and lawyers from the North American community, to analyze unsolved crimes and other failed investigations utilizing the lens of new technology and emerging investigative methodologies. The Cold Case Society has since partnered with The Murder Accountability Project., where he is also a Director. The Murder Accountability Project's serial offender algorithm to identify and crowdsource new cases, all while matching students to investigate leads in over 200,000 unsolved murders still officially on the books.

== Current research partnerships ==
- Murder Accountability Project. Board of Directors. Washington D.C.
- American Society of Criminology. Associate Member. Columbus, OH
- Center for Homicide Research. Associate Researcher. Minneapolis, MN
- Western University Cold Case Society. Founder & Director. London, Canada
- American Investigative Society of Cold Cases. Academic Committee. Williamsport, PA

== True crime scholarship and television appearances ==
Arntfield has appeared as a subject matter expert, host, writer and producer. His work has been and continues to be the inspiration for several television productions.

From 2013 to 2016 Arntfield was retained as a host, writer, producer, and consultant for the true crime series To Catch a Killer, initially produced for the Oprah Winfrey Network and on subsidiaries of the A&E Network and CBS across Europe, Asia, and Oceania.[1] and later syndicated internationally.

In May 2015, Arntfield was retained by HBO's British distributor to be the spokesman for the DVD and digital release of the true-crime documentary The Jinx and was used to explain to the European media the investigative value of documentary journalism with respect to cold cases.

From 2016 to 2018, Arntfield was attached to an Oxygen Network production that, upon rebranding as a crime broadcaster, attached him to a project loosely based on his work with the Murder Accountability Project; the series was later canceled for unspecified reasons after filming a pilot in Atlanta over the course of 2018.

In 2019, Arntfield appeared as an expert and personality in the Investigation Discovery series Children of the Snow detailing the Oakland County Child Killer case and he was also retained as the chief expert for season two of the A&E Europe series Homicide: Hours to Kill. He is also a recurring expert who appears on a number of CBC series such as the long-running investigative documentary series The Fifth Estate and The National.

Various production companies have optioned Arntfield's life rights as a detective-professor hybrid. He remains attached as a producer and writer for the television adaptions of his true crime books, which are currently still in development.

In addition to the above-mentioned television appearances, Arntfield has also appeared on A Perfect World on NBC Peacock and the Hunt for the Chicago Strangler on Investigation Discovery. He continues to appear on several television series where he shares his expertise with various audiences, including the ongoing Investigation Discovery Series, Time to Kill.

== True crime and other publications ==
Arntfield has also authored or co-authored over a dozen books, including the best-selling and controversial Murder City for which he is arguably best known. In the book he advances a hypothesis, often employing an epistolary format through the use of a now deceased detective's original diary notes, that over a specific interval in the 1960s and 1970s, the city of London, Ontario spawned or otherwise housed more serial killers per capita than any city in Canada, and likely beyond. In 2015, it was announced that Emmy Award-winning Sullivan Entertainment had acquired the television rights to the book, and that a dramatic network series was in development even ahead of the book's release date. Arntfield is signed-on to serve as both co-executive producer and technical consultant for the series.

== Cyberdeviance ==
Arntfield currently holds a Canadian federal research grant to study the sociolinguistic underpinnings of cyberbullying, trolling, and other forms of cyberdeviance and electronic harassment. Having collected over 40,000 samples of cyberbullying text from news message board and social media sites and analyzing their contents, Arntfield has published a number of peer-reviewed journal articles and research papers appearing in textbooks in which he argues that cyberdeviance in many cases has a distinct sexual and fantasy-based component. He argues that cyberbullying and acts of trolling should therefore be understood as being more akin to a paraphilia than traditional physical bullying. In 2016, Arntfield will serve as the visiting Fulbright Research Chair in crime and literature at the English department at Vanderbilt University after being selected as part of a rigorously competitive process overseen by the U.S. Department of State. He will be furthering his research on literary criminology and cyberbullying while there, as well as developing a Vanderbilt iteration of his Cold Case Society. He will return to Western in the fall of 2016.

== Awards ==
Arntfield has been honoured numerous times for his scholarly work. He is a Fulbright scholar who has received multiple excellence in teaching awards. In 2018, he was awarded Western Humanitarian of the Year.

== Consulting work ==
Arntfield has been retained to consult on-site for a wide range of clients across multiple sectors, including media outlets such as the Canadian Broadcasting Corporation (CBC), government and NGO entities from the province of Ontario to Health Care Organizations, as well as industry leaders in risk detection, like CarProof Vehicle History Reports.

Arntfield provides investigative training, interviewing strategies, and statement analysis for some of North America's leading corporate investigation firms, mostly with respect to workplace violence and harassment, as well as risk assessments regarding high-risk terminations.

== Publications ==
=== Books ===
- Introduction to Forensic Writing, Co-author: Justice K.A. Gorman. Toronto: Carswell (2014)
- Murder City: The Untold History of Canada's Capital of Serial Homicide, 1959–84. Victoria: FriesenPress (2015)
- Healthcare Writing: A Practical Guide to Professional Success. Co-author: Dr. J. Johnston. Calgary: Broadview Press (2015)
- Gothic Forensics: Criminal Investigative Procedure & Evidence in Victorian Horror & Mystery. New York: Palgrave-Macmillan (2016)
- The Criminal Humanities: An Introduction. New York: Peter Lang Publishing (2016)
- Mad City: The True Story of the Campus Murders That America Forgot. Little A (2017) (Amazon charts top seller and most-read book. Optioned by AMC Studios. One of the top two notable true crime books of 2017)
- Murder in Plain English: From Manifestos to Memes--Looking at Murder through the Words of Killers. Prometheus Books; American First edition (2017)
- Monster City: Murder, Music, and Mayhem in Nashville's Dark Age. Little A (2018) (Amazon charts top seller. Optioned by New Metric Media - producers of Letterkenny and Bad Blood)
- Workplace Violence & Harassment: A Forensic Investigation Handbook. San Diego: Cognella Academic Publishing (2020 – forthcoming)
- How to Solve a Cold Case: Disrupting the Murder Industry. Toronto: HarperCollins (2020-forthcoming)
- Practical Criminology. Toronto: Nelson Education (2020 – forthcoming)

=== Articles in edited books and anthologies ===
- "Crime in America: 1921-1940." In: The Social History of Crime & Punishment in America, 5th Edition. Thousand Oaks, CA: Sage Publications (2012)
- "Corporate Criminal Liability." In: The Encyclopedia of White-Collar & Corporate Crime, 2nd Edition. Thousand Oaks, CA: Sage Publications (2013)
- "Workplace Deaths." In: The Encyclopedia of White-Collar & Corporate Crime, 2nd Edition. Thousand Oaks, CA: Sage Publications (2013)
- "Watergate." In: The Encyclopedia of Lying & Deception. Thousand Oaks, CA: Sage Publications (2014)
- "Fantasy & Imagination." In: The Encyclopedia of Lying & Deception. Thousand Oaks, CA: Sage Publications (2014)
- "eMemoriam: Digital Necrologies, Virtual Remembrance, & the Problem of Permanence." In: Digital Death: Mortality & Beyond in the Online Age. Santa Barbara, CA: Praeger (2014)
- "Cybercrime & Cyberdeviance." In: Criminology: A Canadian Perspective, 8th Edition. Toronto: Nelson (2014)
- "Grab Some Wall: A Man in Uniform, Metropolitan Toronto, & the Fog of the Street." In: Screening Justice: Canadian Crime Films & Society. Winnipeg: Fernwood Press (2015)
- "Necrophilia & Digital Media." In: Necrophilia: A Global Anthology. San Diego: Cognella Press (2015)
- "Necrophilia in English Literature, Poetry, & Prose." In: Necrophilia: A Global Anthology. San Diego: Cognella Press (2015)
- "Cold Case Homicides: Challenges & Opportunities." In: Homicide: A Forensic Psychology Casebook. Boca Raton, FL: CRC Press (2016)
- "Cybercrime & Cyberdeviance." In: Criminology: A Canadian Perspective, 9th Edition. Toronto: Nelson. (2019)

=== Journal articles ===
- "Toward a Cybervictimology: Cyberbullying, Routine Activities Theory, & the Anti-Sociality of Social Media." (2015) The Canadian Journal of Communication,
- "The Monster of Seymour Avenue: Internet Crime News & Gothic Reportage in the Case of Ariel Castro." (2015) Semiotica.
- "Money. Armed. Quietly: A Sociolinguistic Analysis of Institutional Holdup Notes." (2016) Semiotica – forthcoming/in press
- "Out of Exile: The Recusal of the Chicago Police Department from American Crime Fiction, 1960-2010." The Canadian Review of American Studies. Vol. 43(1). 388-410 (2013)
- "Media Forensics & Fragmentary Evidence: Locard's Exchange Principle in the Era of New Media." The Canadian Journal of Media Studies. Vol. 11(1). 2-27 (2013)
- "TVPD: The Generational Diegetics of the Police Procedural and the Automation of American Law Enforcement." The Canadian Review of American Studies. Vol. 41(1). 55-75 (2011)
- "Vulnerable Position Screening: HR Due Diligence or Police-Corporate Collusion?" The International Journal of Knowledge, Culture, & Change Management. Vol. 20 (9). (2011)
- "Hegemonic Shorthand: Technology & Metonymy in Modern Policing." The Communication Review. Vol. 11 (1). 76-97 (2008)
- "Wikisurveillance: A Genealogy of Cooperative Watching in the West." The Bulletin of Science, Technology & Society. Vol. 28 (1). 37-47 (2008)
- "The Aesthetic Calculus: Sex Appeal, Circuitry, and Invisibility." The Bulletin of Science, Technology, and Society. Vol. 27(1). 37-47 (2007)

=== Essays and editorials ===
- "Mean Girls to Mass Sociogenic Illnesses: A Criminal Ecology of Female Adolescents." In: Beyond Five Paragraphs: Advanced Essay Writing Skills. Toronto: McGraw-Hill-Pearson (2015)
- "Policing 2.0: The Necessity of Police-Academic Partnerships in a Knowledge-Based Economy." RCMP National Gazette. Vol. 74(4). (2012)

=== Podcast Appearances ===
- Game of Crimes: Mike Arntfield is Hunting Serial Killers with Data. September 12, 2022.
- Suspect Zero
