= IThentic =

Canadian video content company

iThentic is an online and mobile video content production and distribution company based in Toronto, Ontario, Canada. iThentic concentrates on production of original content as well as aggregation of content created solely by independent video producers for mobile and online presentation.

== History ==
iThentic was founded in June 2006 by film and television industry veterans Catherine Tait, partner in Duopoly, former president and COO of Salter Street Films, and former executive director of the Independent Feature Project; Al Cattabiani, founder and former CEO of Wellspring Media; and Liz Manne, partner in Duopoly, former EVP, Programming and Marketing, Sundance Channel, and former EVP of Fine Line Features.

== Content ==
=== Original productions ===
In July 2007, iThentic launched "Global Mobile: Food", a collaboration with ITVS, the San Francisco-based Independent Television Service, that invited eight international filmmakers to create short films on the subject of food. The project was showcased at the 2008 Berlin Film Festival.

In 2007–2008, iThentic co-produced with the National Film Board of Canada "Mobile Stories: Obsession", an interactive series of videos and website exploring the narrative format for mobile platforms. The project was nominated for a Canadian New Media Award as well as the International Animation Festival awards.

In 2011, iThentic produced an interactive web series entitled "Guidestones". The series was a co-production with writer and director Jay Ferguson's 3 O'Clock.TV and was released in 2012. Produced with the assistance of the Independent Production Fund and the Ontario Media Development Council, the series was filmed in Canada, the United States and India.

=== Festival: Shortsnonstop ===
iThentic produces and manages the Shortsnonstop Mobile Movie Festival on behalf of the Canadian Film Centre's Worldwide Short Film Festival. Shortsnonstop awards cash prizes of $1,500 to the best entry every quarter. Shortsnonstop accepts short film submissions under three minutes running time in English or no dialogue, and from any country of origin. Past winners include Peter Lacalamita's "The Red Kite" and "Moonstruck", Devin Lim's "Grimoire", Keith Claxton's "Walker Stalker", Clemens Kogler's "Herr Bar", Karen Weiss's "Bad Head Day" and most recently Tor Kristoffersen's "Enough".

Winners of the Shortsnonstop Festival for 2010:

- January 15, 2010: A TV Movie, written and directed by Daniel Faigle
- April 15, 2010: Act, written and directed by Rob Savage
- July 15, 2010: Irasshai, written and directed by Yia Tien Tu

iThentic launched the Shortsnonstop Audience Choice Award, which allows friends and fans to vote for their favorite online film. Audience Award deadlines run one month after entry deadline.

== Joint venture partners ==
In April 2007, Barna Alper Productions made an investment in iThentic, shifting its base of operations from New York City to Toronto, making the joint venture the first Canadian company dedicated to the production and aggregation of independently produced video content destined for online and mobile distribution. In November 2008, iThentic entered into a joint venture with Smiley Guy Studios, the Toronto-based production company. iThentic's operations remain based in Toronto but are now managed by Smiley Guy and CEO Jonas Diamond. Catherine Tait serves as chairman of the company.

== Founding partnerships ==
iThentic's founding partners include the Canadian Film Centre, Center for Asian American Media, Creative Capital, Film Catcher, Filmmaker Magazine, IFP, Indo American Arts Council, ITVS, Link TV and SXSW.
