= Michael Smith (chef) =

Canadian television chef and writer (born 1966)

Michael Dixon Smith
- Born: October 12, 1966 (age 59); New York City, U.S.
- Education: Culinary Institute of America; Rochester Institute of Technology
- Culinary career
- Cooking style: Canadian Regional
- Current restaurant(s): Chef Emeritus The Inn at Bay Fortune
- Television show(s): The Inn Chef Chef at Home Chef at Large Chef Abroad Chef Michael's Kitchen Chopped: Canada
- Website: chefmichaelsmith.com

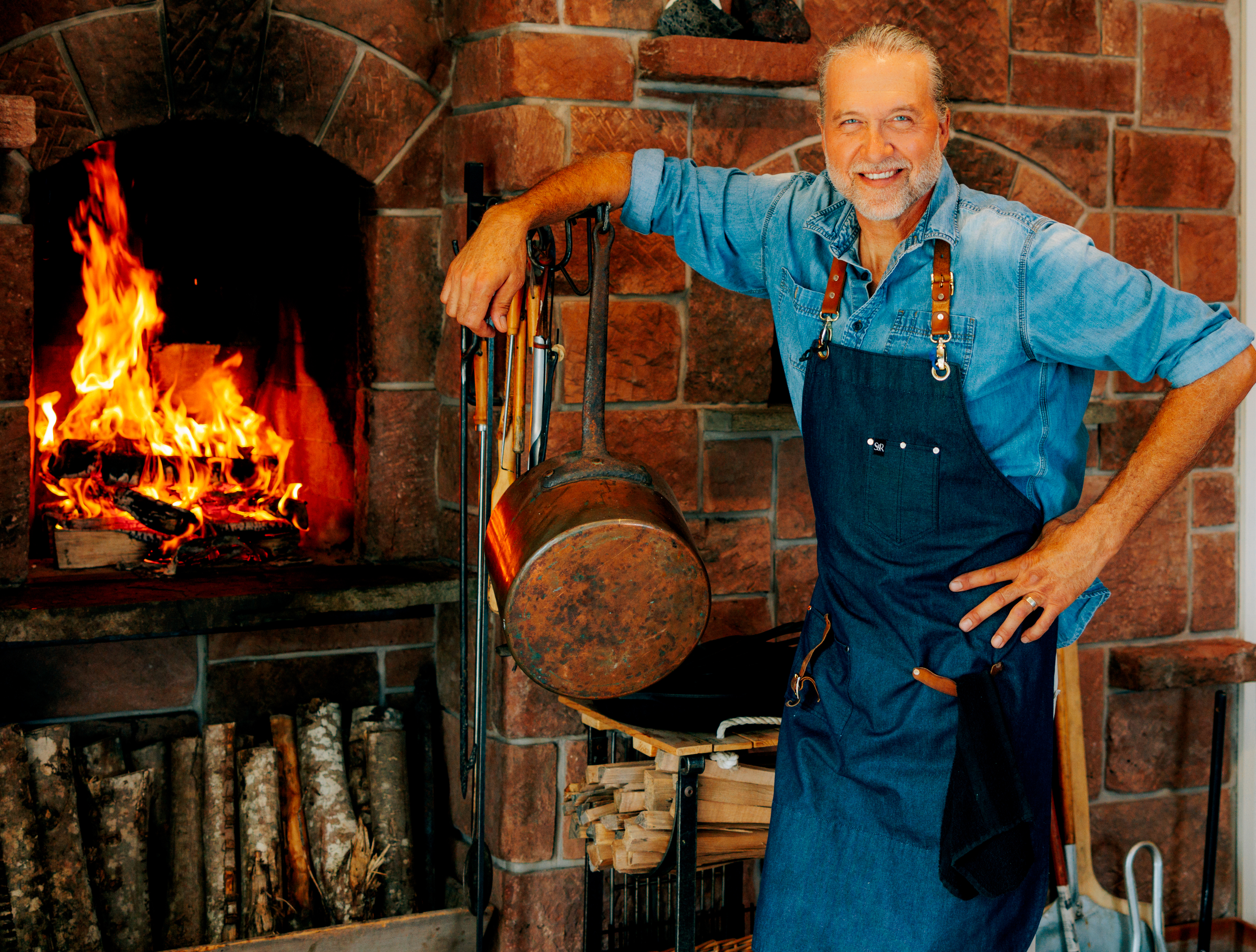
Chef Michael Smith with his home wood fired oven

Michael Dixon Smith CM is an American-born Canadian chef and cookbook writer. He has hosted The Inn Chef, Chef at Home, and judged on Chopped: Canada on the Canadian Food Network. Smith is Prince Edward Island's Food Ambassador, a nutritional activist, and an advocate for sustainable home cooking and farm-to-table cuisine.

== Career ==
At age seventeen, Smith started cooking in kitchens while attending art school. Within five years he was the Head Chef at a large, upscale bistro. He then enrolled at The Culinary Institute of America, where he graduated second in his class. After graduation, Smith worked in Michelin three-star restaurants in Europe, as well as kitchens in South Africa, the Caribbean, and New York City.

Smith relocated to Prince Edward Island with the desire to cook sustainably by building a garden and developing partnerships with local farmers and fishermen. Smith started as a chef at The Inn at Bay Fortune in 1991. His first television show, The Inn Chef (1998), was filmed on location at the Inn, and across Nova Scotia and Prince Edward Island.

Smith led the team that cooked for athletes in Whistler, British Columbia during the 2010 Vancouver Olympics.

With his wife and business partner Chastity, Smith purchased The Inn at Bay Fortune in 2015. FireWorks, the on site restaurant, practices sustainable cuisine by growing its own vegetables in the surrounding gardens and sourcing local seafood.

In 2019, Smith was appointed to the Order of Canada as a member "for his contributions as a chef, entrepreneur and champion of local foods, as well as for his efforts to develop regional tourism." In the same year, the Smiths opened a sister property, The Inn at Fortune Bridge.

== Personal life ==
On August 17, 2013, Smith married Chastity Smith, a singer-songwriter, on Prince Edward Island, where they live with their three children Gabe, Ariella, and Camille. Smith is a collector of vintage maps.

== Filmography ==
Television
Year	Show	Role	Notes
1999	The Inn Chef	Host	
2000	Chef at Large	Host/Writer	
2004	Chef at Home	Host/Writer	
2005	Superstar Chef Challenge	Judge	
2007	Chef Abroad	Host/Writer	
2008	At The Table With...	Host/Writer	
2010	Iron Chef America	Challenger	Battle Avocado
2010	Food Country	Host/Writer	
2011–2012	Top Chef Canada	Guest Judge	
2014	The Lentil Hunter	Host/Writer	
2014–2015	Chopped Canada	Judge	
2016	Chef Michael's Kitchen	Host/Writer	
2020	Behind The Food	Host/Writer	
2024–present	Chef on Fire	Host/Writer/Executive Producer	

== Bibliography ==
=== Cookbooks ===
- Open Kitchen: A Chef's Day at The Inn at Bay Fortune (1998)
- The Inn Chef: Creative Ingredients, Sensational Flavours (1999)
- Chef at Home (2005)
- The Best of Chef at Home: Essential Recipes for Today's Kitchen (2009)
- Chef Michael Smith's Kitchen: 100 of My Favourite Easy Recipes (2011)
- Fast Flavours: 110 Simple Speedy Recipes (2012)
- Back To Basics: 100 Simple Classic Recipes With a Twist (2013)
- Family Meals: 100 Easy Everyday Recipes (2014)
- Make Ahead Meals: Over 100 Easy Time-Saving Recipes (2015)
- Real Food, Real Good: Eat Well With Over 100 of My Simple, Wholesome Recipes (2016)
- Farm, Fire & Feast: Recipes from The Inn at Bay Fortune (2021)
- Farmhouse Vegetables, Recipes from The Culinary Farm: Globe & Mail bestseller list | Short Listed 2024 Taste Canada Awards (2023)
- Wood, Fire & Smoke, Fires of The Inn at Bay Fortune: Indigo’s 25 most anticipated cookbooks of the year (May 13, 2025 Release)
