= The Summit (TV miniseries) =

- Genre: Political thriller
- Written by: John Krizanc
- Directed by: Nick Copus
- Starring: Bruce Greenwood; Christopher Plummer; James Purefoy; Wendy Crewson
- Theme music composer: Tom Third
- Country of origin: Canada
- Original language: English
- No. of episodes: 2

Production
- Producers: Robert Cohen; Shari Cohen; Adam Haight; Robin Neinstein; Christina Jennings; Scott Garvie
- Cinematography: Alwyn Kumst
- Editor: David B. Thompson
- Running time: 240 minutes
- Production company: Shaftesbury Films

Original release
- Network: CBC
- Release: June 15, 2008

The Summit is a Canadian thriller drama television miniseries, which premiered in 2008. Directed by Nick Copus and written by John Krizanc, the miniseries centres on the preparations for an international Group of Seven summit of world leaders which is disrupted by a bioterrorism threat when mysterious forces plan to release an engineered drug-resistant strain of smallpox at the summit opening.

The miniseries stars Bruce Greenwood as Canadian Prime Minister Richard Adderly, Christopher Plummer as U.S. President P. J. Aimes, Wendy Crewson as presidential chief of staff Ellie Bruckner, James Purefoy as Centres for Disease Control investigator Thom Lightstone and Rachelle Lefevre as Adderly's anti-globalization activist daughter Leonie, as well as Mía Maestro, K. C. Collins, Nigel Bennett, Peter MacNeill, Lisa Ray, Stephen McHattie, Denis Akiyama and Raoul Bhaneja in supporting roles.

The miniseries was produced by Shaftesbury Films for the Canadian Broadcasting Corporation, with shooting taking place in England, Ecuador and locations throughout Ontario including Toronto, Hamilton, Huntsville, Parry Sound and Sudbury. Despite being a Canadian production commissioned by a Canadian network, it was aired in the United States by Ion Television in June 2008, in advance of its CBC Television premiere on July 29, 2009.

== Awards ==
The series won three Gemini Awards at the 25th Gemini Awards in 2010, for Best Dramatic Miniseries, Best Original Music Score for a Dramatic Program, Mini-Series or TV Movie (Tom Third) and Best Achievement in Casting (John Buchan, Jason Knight). It was also nominated for Best Actor in a Dramatic Program or Mini-Series (Greenwood), Best Supporting Actor in a Dramatic Program or Mini-Series (Plummer), Best Supporting Actress in a Dramatic Program or Mini-Series (Crewson), Best Direction in a Dramatic Program or Mini-Series (Copus), Best Writing in a Dramatic Program or Mini-Series (Krizanc) and Best Makeup (Shauna Llewellyn, Carmela Dos Santos).
