= The Keeper (2004 film) =

2004 thriller starring Dennis Hopper

- UK DVD cover
- Directed by: Paul Lynch
- Written by: Gerald Sanford
- Produced by: Jamie Brown; Juliet Jones
- Starring: Lochlyn Munro; Asia Argento; Dennis Hopper
- Cinematography: Curtis Petersen
- Edited by: Julian Rodd
- Music by: Sacha Puttnam
- Distributed by: Peace Arch Entertainment
- Release date: 2004
- Running time: 95 minutes
- Country: United States
- Language: English

The Keeper is a 2004 American thriller film starring Dennis Hopper and Asia Argento. The film was produced by Peace Arch films for Showtime Network and was released in the UK theaters in 2004 and on DVD in the United States on March 28, 2006.

== Plot ==
Deep within the soundproofed confines of his secluded country home, an upstanding police officer harbors a dark secret in director Paul Lynch's tense tale of unjust imprisonment and unhinged madness. On the surface, Lieutenant Krebs is a respected law enforcement officer with close ties to his community. A glance into Krebs' crippled psyche, however, reveals another, much more malevolent persona. Drifting exotic dancer named Gina has been brutally attacked in a near-fatal assault. Offered a ride to the local bus station by the outwardly amiable Lieutenant Krebs after issuing a statement to the local police force, Gina awakens to discover that she is being held captive in an escape-proof basement jail cell with all the discomforts of the county detention center. In the days and weeks that follow, world weary dancer Gina will be forced to wage mental warfare against her increasingly unstable captor if she ever hopes to escape the oppressive lockdown of his basement dungeon and live to tell the tale.

== Cast ==
- Dennis Hopper as Lieutenant Joe Krebs
- Asia Argento as Gina Moore
- Helen Shaver as Ruthie
- Lochlyn Munro as Sergeant Larry Burns
- Charles Frederick as Joe Cody / Man In Black
- Alex Zahara as Derick
