= The Inn Chef =

Canadian television show hosted by Michael Smith

The Inn Chef is a television show hosted by professionally trained chef Michael Smith.

The Inn Chef is filmed on site at Inn at Bay Fortune along with many locations in Prince Edward Island and Nova Scotia. The Inn Chef creates menus that are intended to be imaginative and artistic. The menus are aimed at enticing the connoisseur, the traveler, the comedian, and just about anyone who loves food.

The show is produced by Ocean Entertainment and Cellar Door Productions.

The show debuted on September 15, 1998.

== Broadcasters ==
Current

Past

- Food Network Canada - syndicated reruns
- Life Network - original broadcast
- Prime - syndicated reruns
- SCN - syndicated reruns

== Episode list ==
Season 1:

- Mushroom Strudel (Episode 101)
- Oysters Three Ways (Episode 102)
- Smoked Salmon Napoleon (Episode 103)
- Goat Cheese Stuffed Chicken (Episode 104)
- Strawberry Mint Basket (Episode 105)
- Potato Bacon Cheddar Tart (Episode 106)
- Aged Cheddar Omelet (Episode 107)
- She-Lobster Risotto (Episode 108)
- Campfire Trout (Episode 109)
- Whole Grain Country Bread (Episode 110)
- Just Baked Salmon (Episode 111)
- Sweet Potato Mussel Chowder (Episode 112)
- Exotic Seafood Salad (Episode 113)
- Lovage Clam Chowder (Episode 114)
- Roast Carrot Cake (Episode 115)
- Mediterranean Tuna (Episode 116)
- Molten Chocolate Cake (Episode 117)
- Roast Venison Loin (Episode 118)
- Two Apple Soups (Episode 119)
- Pistachio Stuffed Quail (Episode 120)
- Emu Pot Roast (Episode 121)
- Roast Carrot Terrine (Episode 122)
- Bacon Roast Pork Loin (Episode 123)
- Duck Three Ways (Episode 124)
- Ale Braised Chicken (Episode 126)

Season 2:

- Beef Loin and Ribs (Episode 201)
- Cheddar Biscuits and Chive Eggs (Episode 202)
- Wild Boar (Episode 203)
- Prosciutto Wrapped Cod (Episode 204)
- Seaweed Crusted Salmon (Episode 205)
- Cashew Blueberry Tart (Episode 206)
- Lobster Sandwich (Episode 207)
- Roast Skate Wing (Episode 208)
- Lemon Raspberry Napoleon (Episode 209)
- Roast Pheasant (Episode 210)
- Rack of Lamb (Episode 211)
- Honey Cured Salmon (Episode 212)
- Oxtail Consommé (Episode 213)
- Roquefort Pudding with Cranberries (Episode 214)
- Vermouth Scallops (Episode 215)
- Maple Cured Pork Loin (Episode 216)
- Foie Gras Terrine (Episode 217)
- Sweetbread Napoleon (Episode 218)
- Time for Chocolate (Episode 219)
- Saffron Halibut (Episode 220)
- Southwestern Corn Soup (Episode 221)
- Zippin' Pastas (Episode 222)
- Butterscotch Apple Leaf (Episode 223)
- Lavender Poached Pear (Episode 224)
- Stuffed Squab (Episode 225)
- Potato Crusted Monkfish (Episode 226)

Season 3:

- Maple Cured Hot Smoked Salmon (Episode 301)
- Arctic Char (Episode 302)
- Apple Tart (Episode 303)
- Navy Picnic (Episode 304)
- Lamb Shanks (Episode 305)
- Roasted Strawberries (Episode 306)
- Scallops (Episode 307)
- Beef Tenderloin (Episode 308)
- Tomato Water (Episode 309)
- Black Olive Chicken (Episode 310)
- Golden Blueberry Mousse (Episode 311)
- Salmon (Episode 312)
- Saffron Ratatouille Couscous (Episode 313)

== Books ==
- The Inn Chef: Creative Ingredients, Sensational Flavor (March 4, 2000 Callawind Publications ISBN 1-896511-14-7, ISBN 978-1-896511-14-6)
