= Sarah Richardson =

Canadian Decorator and television personality

- Born: October 22, 1971 (age 54); Toronto, Ontario, Canada
- Occupations: Interior Decorator, TV host
- Years active: 1994–present

Sarah Richardson (born October 22, 1971) is a Canadian interior decorator and television personality who started out her career as a prop stylist in 1994. Since then, she has hosted nine television series on decorating for HGTV in Canada. She is the recipient of a Gemini Award and a Canada's Top 40 Under 40 award.

== Early life and education ==
Richardson was born on October 22, 1971, in Toronto, Ontario. Her mother, Susan Cuddy, was director of design and development for the old City of Toronto. Her father, Douglas Richardson (1939-2026), was a professor of history of art and architecture at the University of Toronto. Her brother, Theo Richardson, is also a designer and is a partner in the New York City firm of Rich, Brilliant, Willing. Richardson's parents divorced when she was five.

Richardson attended high school in Toronto at Havergal College. In 1993, she received a B.A. in Visual Arts (a combination of Art History and Studio Arts) from the University of Western Ontario where she was in the Gamma Phi Beta sorority.

== Career ==
Logo of Sarah Richardson Design

Sarah Richardson runs the interior decorator firm Sarah Richardson Design, which she founded in 1998.

Television series hosted by or starring Sarah Richardson include:

- Design Inc.
- Room Service
- Sarah's House
- Sarah's Cottage
- Sarah 101
- Real Potential
- Sarah's Cottage Rental
- Sarah Off the Grid
- Sarah's Mountain Escape

She has published several best-selling interior design books, and also runs her eponymous YouTube channel with over one hundred thousand subscribers.

== Personal life ==
Richardson is married to Alexander Younger. The couple live in Toronto with their two daughters Robin (born March 2006) and Fiona (born August 2008). Richardson and Younger also own a summer house on Georgian Bay in Ontario, which Richardson decorated and featured in the Canadian television series Sarah's Cottage, which was also broadcast in the United States under the title Sarah's Summer House. The summer house is powered by solar energy and propane. Both of her daughters are ski-racers.
