= Leah McLaren =

Canadian author and newspaper columnist

Leah McLaren (born November 7, 1975) is a Canadian author and newspaper columnist.

== Career ==
In Britain, McLaren's writing has been published in newspapers including The Times, The Evening Standard, and The Sunday Telegraph, as well as in the weekly magazine The Spectator, for which she wrote a controversial and widely read cover story on the romantic failure of the modern English male.

In 2008, the CBC produced Abroad, a television movie of the week that was written and produced by McLaren and based on her experiences as a young Canadian newspaper reporter living and dating in London. It aired once, on March 14, 2010, and was being developed as a series until CBC Television cancelled it before any other episodes were made.

McLaren describes herself as a feminist. She had a regular Saturday column in the Life section of The Globe and Mail, in which she talked about living as a single woman in Toronto. She also had a column in the Arts section. She also wrote "The Leah Files", a monthly column in Flare, a fashion magazine and has written for other publications, including Toronto Life, McGill Daily, enRoute, and others.

From 2018 until 2022, McLaren was Maclean's magazine's London correspondent.

McLaren has published three novels Continuity Girl (2006), A Better Man (2015) and Where You End and I Begin: A Memoir (2022) and has appeared in films Escape from the Newsroom (2002), Cake (2005) and Abroad (2010).

== Controversies ==
In 2012, McLaren tried to sell her own house in a real estate column Home of the Week feature. The piece was ruled a conflict of interest by the Globe's Public Editor Sylvia Stead, although that was too late to stop the $600,000 home from selling above its listing price.

McLaren came under fire for a controversial column she wrote for The Globe and Mail on March 22, 2017, where she admits she once attempted to breastfeed the infant child of Conservative leadership candidate Michael Chong without his or his wife's consent, and while she was not lactating. The paper later removed the piece from its website. Five days after its publication Chong confirmed via Twitter that the incident occurred over ten years previously, describing it as "no doubt odd, but of no real consequence". At the time, McLaren would have been at least 29. On March 30, 2017, the Toronto Star reported that McLaren was suspended for one week by The Globe and Mail.

McLaren's memoir, Where You End and I Begin, faced criticism from several people she wrote about. McLaren's mother, author Cecily Ross, accused McLaren of appropriating her own personal story of sexual assault. Canadian filmmaker Zoe Greenberg, Mclaren's friend at the time, disputed the consensual nature of a sexual encounter with her that Mclaren wrote about, and alleged that she discussed these concerns with both McLaren and the publisher prior to the book being published.
