= Peace Arch Entertainment =

Canadian film and TV production company

- Formerly: Medco (1981–1985); Vidatron Entertainment (1985–1999)
- Type: Production company
- Industry: Motion pictures
- Founded: 1981; 45 years ago
- Defunct: May 16, 2013; 13 years ago
- Fate: Bankruptcy
- Successor: Phase 4 Films
- Headquarters: Toronto, Ontario, Canada
- Key people: Michael Taylor; John Flock; Julie Sultan; Jennifer Graham; Paul Gardner
- Divisions: Kaboom! Entertainment; Trinity Home Entertainment; The Eyes Multimedia Productions

Peace Arch Entertainment ("PAE") (formerly known as Medco from 1981 until 1985 and Vidatron Entertainment from 1985 until 1999, stylized as PEACE ARCH) was a Canadian motion picture and television production company based in Toronto, Ontario, Canada, with offices in Los Angeles and Vancouver. The company produced and acquired feature films and television programs for worldwide distribution. It got filed for bankruptcy and disestablished in 2013.

== History ==
Founded in 1981 as a home entertainment distributor, Peace Arch Entertainment got its name from the famous Peace Arch monument located on the Canada–US border near Blaine, Washington. Much like the monument represents an "open door" policy between the United States and Canada, PAE sought to promote the same form of unity within the company. It was originally known as Medco, before renaming it in 1985, to Vidatron Entertainment, and the company went public.

In 1997, the company bought out Sugar Entertainment.

In 1999, it was then renamed to Peace Arch Entertainment, and continued to develop their own projects.

In 2006, Peace Arch announced that it would acquire children's home video distributor Kaboom! Entertainment for $8.5 million.

In 2007, Peace Arch announced that it would acquire Los Angeles–based home video distributor Trinity Home Entertainment.

In 2009, Peace Arch's home video division and its subsidiary Kaboom! Entertainment was spun-off to form Phase 4 Films, a company founded by Berry Meyerowitz and was later acquired by Entertainment One in 2014.

Peace Arch Entertainment filed for bankruptcy on May 16, 2013.

== Filmography ==
- The Infidel (2010)
- Flick (2010)
- Kandahar Break (2010)
- Who Killed Nancy? (2010)
- What We Do Is Secret (2007)
- JCVD (2008)
- 305 (2008)
- Winged Creatures (2008)
- Delirious (2006)
- Winky's Horse (2005)
- The Keeper (2004)

== Television series ==
- The Immortal (2000)
- Big Sound (2000–2001)
- Animal Miracles (2001–2003)
