= Alex Nadon =

Canadian lighting designer

- Known for: Lighting design
- Awards: Canadian Screen Awards Winner 2015

Alex Nadon is a lighting designer from Canada who won the Canadian Screen Awards for Best Photography in a Variety or Sketch Comedy Program or Series in 2015 for his creation and design of the stage at The 43rd Annual JUNO Awards 2014.

In his stage and lighting design work on the Juno Awards, Nadon has drawn a creative spirit from the host city. For the 43rd Annual Juno Awards held in Winnipeg, Manitoba, Canada, Nadon used stage elements/lighting technology to pay tribute to the host city, by presenting a representation of the city skyline.

At the 2009 Juno Awards, held at Roger's Arena in Vancouver, British Columbia, Canada, Nadon used various LED lighting technologies to visually augment the giant vine leaves in the stage design.

In similar fashion, at the Juno Awards held in host city, St John, Newfoundland, Nadon collaborated with set designer Peter Farragher. The set design showed three large icebergs, onto which were projected Artist's moving images (as provided by the performers), using 3D Bitmap technology.

== Career ==
Nadon's career began in 1996 at the age of 19 when he was part of the rigging and lighting crew at Canada's Wonderland amusement park. Nadon's work on an Electric Circus event led him to meet the Much Music team and soon after he joined their Specials Department as a lighting technician and camera operator. Seven years later, Nadon began his freelance career at The Hour on CBC.

Nadon is the Founder and President of InFrame Designs, a company he started in 2006.

== Nominations ==
In the last six years, Nadon's been nominated multiple times for the Canadian Screen Awards.

In 2010 at The 24th Annual Gemini Awards, Nadon received multiple nominations: in the category of Best Photography in a Comedy, Variety or Performing Arts Program or Series for his work on:/

- The 2009 Juno Awards - (A Short Video Clip and Credits)
- At The Concert Hall- Molly Johnson at The Concert Hall
- Battle of the Blades

At the Gemini Awards 2013, Nadon was nominated in the Best Photography in a Lifestyle or Reality/Competition Program or Series for his work on Top Chef Canada-Restaurant Wars for the episode "Food Through the Ages" In the same year, he was nominated for his work on the Juno Awards 2012.

In 2014, he was nominated in the category of Best Photography in a Variety or Performing Arts or Sketch Comedy Program or Series for his work on the 2013 Juno Awards.

In 2015 he was nominated in the category of Best Production Design or Art Direction in a Non-Fiction Program or Series for his work on The 43rd Annual Juno Awards 2014. That same year, (2015) he won the Canadian Screen Award in the category of Best Photography in a Variety or Sketch Comedy Program or Series for his work on The 43rd Annual JUNO Awards 2014.

== Notable Projects and Show Credits ==
Nadon has provided lighting design services for an array of projects including the following:

JUNO Awards, CTV (Bell Media)

Canadian Country Music Awards, CBC

Big Brother Canada, Global

Canada's Walk of Fame, Global

Canada's Got Talent, Global

New Year's Eve show, Global

Chopped Canada, Food Network

Much Music Video Awards, City/CTV

Qubit, Discovery Channel

Grey Cup Halftime Show, CBC

Joke or Choke, CTV Extend

Battle of the Blades, CBC
