= Licence to Drill =

- Licence to Drill title card
- Narrated by: Adrian Burhop
- Country of origin: Canada
- No. of seasons: 4
- No. of episodes: 28

Production
- Running time: 40–45 minutes

Original release
- Network: Discovery Channel Canada
- Release: January 5, 2010 – present

Licence to Drill is a documentary television series produced by the Montreal-based Pixcom for Discovery Channel Canada. The series documents the activities of two teams of natural gas drillers in the Canadian North in the winter of 2008.

== Format ==
Licence to Drill follows crews from two energy companies: The MGM Energy Corporation crew and the Nabors Drilling crew. The show features off the cuff interactions between team members, formal interviews from both team members and executives at the two companies headquarters, informal commentary to the camera by team members, and voice-over narration. In season two they follow MGM and Bonanza Rig #3 / PennWest Exploration.

=== Narration ===
Licence to Drill is narrated by Canadian actor Adrian Burhop. Every episode, save the pilot, starts out with a standard introducing narrative.

Season one opening:

In the unforgiving winter of the Canadian north, where the Sun shines only a few hours a day, and the temperatures drop to 70 degrees below zero, two companies risk everything to drill thousands of meters into the Earth in search of natural gas. Every day pushes men and machines to the breaking point. This job is not for everyone, but as long as billions of dollars remain locked in the deep there are those that will stop at nothing to get it out. – Opening narration, Licence to Drill

Season two opening:

In the unforgiving winter of the Canadian north, where the Sun rarely shines and the roads are made of ice, two energy companies are going big, ones going for the motherlode – a wildcat well on the edge of the Arctic. The other is betting on new technology to unlock the riches of an old reservoir. Win or lose, the unsung heros are the fearless Rig hands, who brave the cold, drill the rock and risk everything for the oil locked deep inside this frozen land.

== MGM team ==
=== Site ===
The MGM team's base camp is located on the Mackenzie River Delta on the shores of the Beaufort Sea in the Northwestern part of Canada's Northwest Territories. The team is drilling three wells, in chronological order of drilling: J-27, J-17, and A-25 which are located 13, 29, and 10 km from base camp respectively. All of the equipment was loaded onto 18 barges in September 2008 at Inuvik and sailed down the Mackenzie 180 kilometers to the eventual winter base camp, where it waited over two months for the winter to set in and the ground to freeze.

=== Members ===
- John Williams – field superintendent
- Josh Blinston – drilling supervisor (second in command)
- Jason Savage – drilling supervisor
- Ron Krinke – construction supervisor
- Clint Buchinski – drilling supervisor
- Tyson Pages – driller
- Darcy Blancher – derrickhand
- MGM team page

== Nabors team ==
=== Site ===
The Nabors team base camp, known as Rig 99, is located in Northeastern British Columbia near the foothills of the Rocky Mountains. It consists of two wells located 100 metres apart. The Nabors equipment was flown in by the largest helicopter in the world, the Russian Mil Mi-26, nicknamed Корова (pronounced Kor-oh-vah, which means Cow) by its crew, in 65 loads. According to rig manager Denny Milan over 20 years of research and development went into the components of Rig 99, which he described as "a giant Lego set."

=== Members ===
- Denny Millan – rig manager
- Paris Gagné – wellsite supervisor
- Kate Connolley – wellsite geologist
- Cliff Robinson – driller
- Kevin Long – driller
- Peter Vander Veen – directional driller
- Clint Mantie – derrickhand
- Tom Forsyth – motorhand
- Nabors Team Page

=== PennWest exploration team ===
The PennWest team base camp, known as Bonanza Rig #3, is located in Drayton Valley, Alberta.

=== Members ===
- Logan Wild - rig supervisor
- Kelly Pelsma - driller
- Cody Wilson - driller
- Mike Bencz - derrickhand
- Jesse Halikas - motorhand
- Dakota Knull - motorhand
- Colton Bosch - driller

== Broadcasters ==
In Australia the series premiered on April 1, 2015, on A&E Australia.
