= To Catch a Killer (TV series) =

Canadian true crime episodic docudrama

To Catch a Killer is a true crime episodic docudrama produced for OWN Canada (Corus Entertainment) by Ocean Entertainment. The series follows a squad of civilians working under the guidance of Dr. Michael Andrew Arntfield as they seek new evidence in unsolved murder cases. The civilians come from diverse backgrounds, bringing new technology and fresh eyes to these cases. The civilians are Registered Psychologist Antonella Magnatta, Danya Dixon, Renee Willmon, Peter Leimbigler and Douglas Montgomery.

Each of the 8 one-hour-long episodes features a single case ranging in age from 13 to 45 years. Inspired by the work of Dr. Arntfield’s cold case society the team passes their findings on to the relevant police department.

== International broadcast ==
- Australia — Began airing on 17 December 2014 on CI.

== Episodes ==
1. Cold CASE: Awcock
2. Cold CASE: McWilliam
3. Cold CASE: Buller
4. Cold CASE: English
5. Cold CASE: Gurczenski
6. Cold CASE: Roach
7. Cold CASE: Frost
8. Cold CASE: White

== See also ==
- Cold Case Files, USA / A&E, 1999 (true cases)
- Solved, USA / ID, 2008 (true cases)
- Cold Justice, USA / TNT, 2013 (true cases)
