= Ocean Entertainment =

Production company based in Halifax, Nova Scotia

Ocean Entertainment Limited
- Company type: Privately-held company
- Industry: Production
- Founded: 1995; 31 years ago
- Headquarters: Halifax, Nova Scotia, Canada
- Subsidiaries: Ocean Digital, Tweeq Audio
- Website: Official website

Ocean Entertainment Limited is an independent Canadian production company based in Halifax, Nova Scotia. Established in 1995, the company has specialized in the production of television series and documentaries.

Ocean Entertainment also owns Ocean Digital, a full service picture editing facility with five digital suites, and Tweeq Audio, fully equipped audio post facility.

== Current and past productions ==
- The Candy Show
- The Château Dinner
- Chef Abroad
- Chef at Home
- Chef at Large
- Childhood Lost
- Family Renovation
- French Food at Home
- The Food Hunter
- The Hero's Hero
- The Inn Chef
- Mechanical Chicks
- Minyan on the Mira
- The Moody Brood
- Mountain Magic
- Nightmare in Canada
- Red Hot and Ready
- Reinventing Ritual
- Resourceful Renovator
- Saturday Night
- Shadow Hunter
- Shag Harbour UFO Incident
- Spice Goddess
- To Catch a Killer
