= Man-Made Food =

Canadian television cooking show

Man-Made Food is a Canadian television cooking show, which airs on Food Network Canada.

The show stars Dave Burnett, Joel Rousell, and Steven Moore.
