= Duopoly (entertainment company) =

Duopoly is an independent film, television and multi-platform content company founded in 2002 by Catherine Tait and Liz Manne. Tait and Manne, both veterans of the independent film and television industries, established the company in order to develop and produce compelling new content properties, to forge productive relationships with talent and creators from Canada and the US, and to help create new businesses in the entertainment space. Among Duopoly's productions are Pure Pwnage, Chilly Beach, Bam Bam and Celeste starring Margaret Cho, and Yam Roll.

== See also ==
- iThentic
