= Sarah's House =

Canadian television reality series

Sarah's House is a Canadian television reality series hosted by Toronto interior designer Sarah Richardson, which airs on HGTV. The program's on-air team also includes interior designer Tommy Smythe and contractor Vito Colucci, as well as Richardson's husband, marketing communications specialist Alexander Younger.

In each season of the series, Richardson purchases an outdated and undervalued house, and depicts the process of renovating the house. Each episode focuses on one room or two related rooms within the renovation project.

The program's first season aired in 2007, followed by the second airing in fall 2008. Season 3 premiered March 9, 2010 on HGTV Canada. The fourth season began airing in fall 2011.

== Sarah's Cottage spinoff ==
A similar program, which aired in spring 2009, was entitled Sarah's Cottage, and featured Richardson doing a similar renovation on her own family cottage. In 2015, Sarah's Rental Cottage aired, with Richardson tackling a renovation on a cottage she had purchased as a vacation rental property.
