= 2012–13 Canadian network television schedule =

The 2012–13 network television schedule for the five major English commercial broadcast networks in Canada covers primetime hours from September 2012 through May 2013. The schedule is followed by a list per network of returning series, new series, and series canceled after the 2011–2012 season, for Canadian, American and other series.

CBC Television was the first to announce its fall schedule on May 10, 2012, followed by Citytv on May 29, 2012 and Global on May 30, 2012; this will be followed by CTV and CTV Two on May 31. As in the past, the commercial networks' announcements come shortly after the networks have had a chance to buy Canadian rights to new American series.

== Legend ==
Light blue indicates Local Programming.
Grey indicates Encore Programming.
Light green indicates sporting events.
Orange indicates movies.
Red indicates Canadian content shows, which is programming that originated in Canada.
Magenta indicates series being burning off and other irregularly scheduled programs, including specials.
Cyan indicates Various Programming.

== Schedule ==
- New series are highlighted in **bold**.
- All times given are in Canadian Eastern Time and Pacific Time (except for some live events or specials).
  - Most CBC programming airs at the same local time in all time zones, except Newfoundland time (add 30 minutes).
  - For commercial stations in the Central Time Zone, subtract one hour.
  - For commercial stations in the Atlantic and Mountain time zones, add one hour for programming between 8:00 and 10:00 PM. Programs airing at 10:00 PM ET/PT will generally air at 8:00 PM local on stations in these areas. For viewers in the Newfoundland time zone, add an additional 30 minutes to the Atlantic time schedule.
  - Notwithstanding the above, timeslots may occasionally vary further in some areas due to local simultaneous substitution considerations, compliance with watershed restrictions, or other factors.

=== Sunday ===
PM		7:00	7:30	8:00	8:30	9:00	9:30	10:00	10:30
CBC		Heartland		**Over the Rainbow**		Encore Programming		The National	
Citytv	Fall	Local Programming		30 Rock	Happy Endings	Revenge		**666 Park Avenue**	
Citytv	Follow-up	Local Programming		**Malibu Country**	Happy Endings	Revenge		**666 Park Avenue**	
CTV		Once Upon a Time		The Amazing Race		**The Mob Doctor**		The Mentalist	
CTV Two		America's Next Top Model		Mike & Molly	Up All Night	CTV Movie			
Global	Fall	Howie Do It		The Simpsons	Bob's Burgers	Family Guy	American Dad!	The Good Wife	
Global	Follow-up	Howie Do It	The Cleveland Show	The Simpsons	Bob's Burgers	Family Guy	American Dad!	The Good Wife	

=== Monday ===
PM	8:00	8:30	9:00	9:30	10:00	10:30
CBC	**Over the Rainbow**	Who Do You Think You Are?	Murdoch Mysteries		The National	
Citytv	How I Met Your Mother	**Partners**	2 Broke Girls	Don't Trust the B— in Apartment 23	**Revolution**	
CTV	Dancing with the Stars				Castle	
CTV Two	The Voice				Encore Programming	
Global	Bones		Parenthood		Hawaii Five-0	

=== Tuesday ===
PM	8:00	8:30	9:00	9:30	10:00	10:30
CBC	Rick Mercer Report	This Hour Has 22 Minutes	The Big Decision		The National	
Citytv	Raising Hope	**Ben & Kate**	New Girl	**The Mindy Project**	Private Practice	
CTV	Dancing with the Stars		**Anger Management**	**The New Normal**	Criminal Minds	
CTV Two	The Voice		**Emily Owens, M.D.**		Castle	
Global	NCIS		NCIS: Los Angeles		**Vegas**	

=== Wednesday ===
PM		8:00	8:30	9:00	9:30	10:00	10:30
CBC		Dragons' Den		**Titanic: Blood and Steel**		The National	
Citytv		The Middle	Suburgatory	Modern Family	**The Bachelor Canada**		
CTV	Fall	The X Factor				CSI: Crime Scene Investigation	
CTV	Mid-season	American Idol				CSI: Crime Scene Investigation	
CTV Two		**Arrow**		Law & Order: Special Victims Unit		**Nashville**	
Global		Survivor		**Go On**	**Guys with Kids**	**Chicago Fire**	

=== Thursday ===
PM		8:00	8:30	9:00	9:30	10:00	10:30
CBC		The Nature of Things		Doc Zone		The National	
Citytv		30 Rock	Parks and Recreation	Person of Interest		Scandal	
CTV		The Big Bang Theory	Two and a Half Men	Grey's Anatomy		Flashpoint	
CTV Two	Fall	The X Factor		The Vampire Diaries		Encore Programming	
CTV Two	Mid-season	American Idol		The Vampire Diaries		Encore Programming	
Global		**Last Resort**		Glee		**Elementary**	

=== Friday ===
PM		8:00	8:30	9:00	9:30	10:00	10:30
CBC		Marketplace	Encore Programming	The Fifth Estate		The National	
Citytv	Fall	The Middle	Community	Fringe		Encore Programming	
Citytv	Follow-up	Last Man Standing	Community	Fringe		Encore Programming	
CTV		CSI: NY		Grimm		Blue Bloods	
CTV Two		Shark Tank		Nikita		Dateline NBC	
Global	Fall	Touch		**Made in Jersey**		16x9	
Global	Mid-fall	Touch		Encore programming		16x9	

=== Saturday ===
PM	8:00	8:30	9:00	9:30	10:00	10:30
CBC	Hockey Night in Canada					
CTV	The Big Bang Theory				The Neighbors	Hot in Cleveland
Global	Recipe to Riches		Encore Programming		Close Up	

== By network ==
=== CBC Television ===
Canadian series:

Returning series:

- Dragons' Den
- Doc Zone
- The Fifth Estate
- Heartland
- Hockey Night in Canada
- The National
- Marketplace
- The Nature of Things
- Rick Mercer Report
- This Hour Has 22 Minutes
- The Big Decision
- Who Do You Think You Are?

Arrived series:

- Murdoch Mysteries (moved from Citytv)

New series:

- Cracked
- Over the Rainbow
- Titanic: Blood and Steel

Not returning from 2011–12:

- Battle of the Blades
- Being Erica
- Michael: Tuesdays and Thursdays

Other series:

Returning series:

- Coronation Street

New series:

Not returning from 2011–12:

- Jeopardy!
- Wheel of Fortune

=== Citytv ===
Canadian series:

New series:

- The Bachelor Canada
- Package Deal
- Seed

Not returning from 2011–12:

- Beyond Survival
- Murdoch Mysteries (moved to CBC Television)
- The Quon Dynasty

American series:

Returning series:

- 2 Broke Girls
- 30 Rock
- Community
- Don't Trust the B— in Apartment 23
- Fringe
- Happy Endings
- How I Met Your Mother
- Last Man Standing
- The Middle
- Modern Family
- New Girl
- Parks and Recreation
- Person of Interest
- Private Practice
- Revenge
- Scandal
- Suburgatory

New series:

- 1600 Penn
- 666 Park Avenue
- Ben & Kate
- The Carrie Diaries
- The Goodwin Games
- How to Live with Your Parents (for the Rest of Your Life)
- Hannibal
- Malibu Country
- The Mindy Project
- Partners
- Revolution
- Next Caller

Not returning from 2011–12:

- Dussault Inc. (moved to The Biography Channel)
- Extreme Makeover: Home Edition
- Man Up!
- The Playboy Club
- Terra Nova
- Work It
- GCB
- The Glass House
- Alcatraz

=== CTV/CTV Two ===
Canadian series:

New series:

- Motive

Returning series:

- Flashpoint

Not returning from 2011–12:

- Sanctuary

American series:

Returning series:

- The Amazing Race
- America's Next Top Model
- The Big Bang Theory
- Blue Bloods
- Castle
- Criminal Minds
- CSI: Crime Scene Investigation
- CSI: NY
- Dateline NBC
- Grey's Anatomy
- Grimm
- Hot in Cleveland
- Law & Order: Special Victims Unit
- The Mentalist
- Mike & Molly
- Nikita
- Once Upon a Time
- Shark Tank
- Two and a Half Men
- The Vampire Diaries
- The Voice
- Up All Night
- Whitney
- The X Factor

New series:

- Anger Management
- Arrow
- Do No Harm
- Emily Owens, M.D.
- The Family Tools
- The Following
- Golden Boy
- The Mob Doctor
- Nashville
- The Neighbors
- The New Normal
- Zero Hour
- Red Widow

Not returning from 2011–12:

- CSI: Miami
- Desperate Housewives
- Man Up!
- Pan Am
- The Protector
- Unforgettable
- Who's Still Standing?
- Smash

=== Global ===
Canadian series:

New series:

- Close Up

Returning series:

- 16:9
- Recipe to Riches

American series:

Returning series:

- American Dad!
- Bob's Burgers
- Bones
- The Cleveland Show
- Family Guy
- Glee
- The Good Wife
- Happily Divorced
- Hawaii Five-0
- Kitchen Nightmares
- NCIS
- NCIS: Los Angeles
- The Office
- Parenthood
- The Simpsons
- Survivor
- Touch

New series:

- Chicago Fire
- Elementary
- Go On
- Guys with Kids
- Last Resort
- Made in Jersey
- Vegas
- Friend Me
- Deception
- Camp

Not returning from 2011–12:

- A Gifted Man
- Awake
- Allen Gregory
- Harry's Law
- House
- How to Be a Gentleman
- I Hate My Teenage Daughter
- Prime Suspect
- Ringer
- NYC 22
- 3
- Napoleon Dynamite

== Top weekly ratings ==
- Note: English Canadian television only by viewers age 2 and up
- "2012-13 National Top Program Reports Archive". bbm.ca. Archived from the original on November 22, 2012.

Week	Name	Viewers (in millions)	Network
August 27-September 2	The Big Bang Theory	2.250	CTV
September 3-September 9	The Big Bang Theory	2.101	CTV
September 10-September 16	The Big Bang Theory	1.931	CTV
September 17-September 23	Survivor: Philippines	2.885	Global
September 24-September 30	The Big Bang Theory	4.242	CTV
October 1-October 7	The Big Bang Theory	3.940	CTV
October 8-October 14	The Big Bang Theory	4.286	CTV
October 16-October 21	The Big Bang Theory	4.565	CTV
October 22-October 28	The Big Bang Theory	4.357	CTV
October 29-November 4	The Big Bang Theory	4.222	CTV
November 5-November 11	The Big Bang Theory	3.993	CTV
November 12-November 18	The Big Bang Theory	3.860	CTV
November 19-November 25	100th Grey Cup	5.464	TSN
November 26-December 2	The Big Bang Theory	3.461	CTV
December 3-December 9	The Big Bang Theory	3.949	CTV
December 10-December 16	The Big Bang Theory	3.930	CTV
December 17-December 23	NCIS	2.727	Global
December 24-December 30	CTV National News	1.464	CTV
December 31-January 6	The Big Bang Theory	4.688	CTV
January 7-January 13	The Big Bang Theory	4.119	CTV
January 14-January 20	Hockey Night in Canada	3.317	CBC
January 21-January 27	CSI: Crime Scene Investigation	2.269	CTV
January 28-February 3	Super Bowl XLVII	6.447	CTV
February 4-February 10	The Big Bang Theory	3.561	CTV
February 11-February 17	The Big Bang Theory	3.877	CTV
February 18-February 24	85th Academy Awards	6.065	CTV
February 25-March 3	NCIS	2.847	Global
March 4-March 10	The Big Bang Theory	3.611	CTV
March 11-March 17	The Big Bang Theory	3.745	CTV
March 18-March 24	NCIS	2.731	Global
March 25-March 31	Hockey Night in Canada	2.334	CBC
April 8-April 14	The Big Bang Theory	2.458	CTV
April 15-April 21	Hockey Night in Canada	2.410	CBC
April 22-April 28	The Big Bang Theory	3.471	CTV
April 29-May 5	The Big Bang Theory	3.119	CTV
May 6-May 12	The Big Bang Theory	3.117	CTV
May 13-May 19	Hockey Night in Canada	5.155	CBC
May 20-May 26	Criminal Minds	2.046	CTV
May 27-June 2	Hockey Night in Canada	2.035	CBC
June 3-June 9	Hockey Night in Canada	2.240	CBC
June 10-June 16	Hockey Night in Canada	2.572	CBC
June 17-June 23	Hockey Night in Canada	2.698	CBC
June 24-June 30	Hockey Night in Canada	3.401	CBC
July 1-July 7	Under the Dome	1.609	Global
July 8-July 14	Under the Dome	1.784	Global
July 15-July 21	Amazing Race Canada	2.986	CTV
July 22-July 28	Amazing Race Canada	2.871	CTV
July 29-August 4	Amazing Race Canada	2.909	CTV
August 5-August 11	Amazing Race Canada	2.425	CTV
August 12-August 18	Amazing Race Canada	2.870	CTV
