= Recipe to Riches (Australian TV series) =

- Genre: Reality, cooking
- Based on: Recipe to Riches
- Country of origin: Australia
- Original language: English
- No. of series: 2
- No. of episodes: 20

Production
- Running time: 60 minutes
- Production companies: FremantleMedia Australia; Woolworths

Original release
- Network: Network Ten
- Release: 27 August 2013 – 9 December 2014

Related
- Recipe to Riches

Recipe to Riches is an Australian television reality show that screened on Network Ten from 27 August 2013. It involves cooks from around the country, competing to have their recipe become a brand product in supermarkets. Competitors cook their dishes, create a brand for their product and devise strategies to launch it to the public. The contestants are mentored by Carolyn Creswell, owner of Carman's Fine Foods, David Nobay, an advertising industry expert, and chef Darren Robertson. The mentors are joined by a representative from Woolworths supermarkets to decide the winning product, which will by made available for sale in Woolworths the day after the episode airs. The winner of the whole series receive $100,000 and a partnership with Woolworths.

The show is based on the Canadian reality television show, Recipe to Riches.

Season 1 was won by Garth Midgley with his product Chocorn on 12 November 2013. Season 2 was won by Michael Cainero with his Chunky Pork and Apple Sausages on 9 December 2014.

== Experts ==
Expert	Job	Description
Carolyn Creswell	Entrepreneur	Bought the small muesli company where she had a part-time job with $1,000 at 18. The company has grown into Carman's Fine Foods, a thriving and inspirational business that now exports to 32 countries and recently and celebrated its 25-year anniversary in 2017. Carolyn has managed to grow Carman's to become the number one selling muesli brand on Australian supermarket shelves.
Jess Gill	Woolworths Director of Customer Experience	Responsible for driving collaboration across all business teams to redefine the approach to store design, layout, space allocation and customer experience across all customer touchpoints, the Customer Experience team is also responsible for Own Brand and Brand strategy and works closely with both the Marketing and Commercial teams to bring these brands to life.
Darren Robertson	Chef	English-born, moved to Australia in 2001 and worked at acclaimed Sydney's restaurant Tetsuya's for seven years, including three years as head chef, assisted Tetsuya at The World Summit of Gastronomy in 2009, went into business with a group of friends, The Three Blue Ducks in Bronte, a small cool café, has gone from strength to strength winning the Best Breakfast in Sydney accolade by the SMH Good Food Guide within its first year of opening.
Russell Howcroft	Marketing	Acclaimed marketing expert and the Executive General Manager of Network Ten, former Chairman of the Advertising Federation of Australia, regular commentator on radio in Melbourne, He also sits on the boards of the Melbourne Football Club, The Australian Academy Cinema Television Arts and Free TV Australia.

== Season 1 ==
Week		Date	Recipe winner	Recipe
1	"Snack Attack"	27 August 2013	Connie Travella	Concetta's Croqs
2	"The Freezer"	3 September 2013	Sara jade	Chilli Con Carne
3	"Condiments"	10 September 2013	Stephen Perry	Hickory Hollow Smoked Sauce
4	"World Table"	15 September 2013	Manju Jehu	Vegetable Samosas
5	"Desserts"	23 September	Vicki Cameron-Smith	Sweet Billies
6	"Something Sweet"	1 October 2013	Garth Midgley	Chocorn
7	"Do-It-Yourself"	8 October 2013	Chris Paschalidis	Golden Greek Pizza Dough & Sauce
8	"Food for Thought"	15 October 2013	Rose Bonfa	Rosie's Kitchen Almond Biscuits
9	"Man Food"	22 October 2013	Bobby Edwards	Rude Boy Ribs Sauce
10	"Classics"	29 October 2013	Susie Barnes	Butchers Secret Hearty Stew
11	"Party Food"	5 November 2013	Ramsay Horton	Horton's Jangles
12	"Finale"	11 November 2013	Garth Midgley	Chocorn

== See also ==
- List of Australian television series
- List of cooking shows
