= 2011–12 Canadian network television schedule =

The 2011–12 Canadian network television schedule indicates the fall prime time schedules for Canada's major English and French broadcast networks. For schedule changes after the fall launch, please consult each network's individual article.

Canadian content shows in the tables have a	red	highlight.

== 2011 official fall schedule ==
=== Sunday ===
PM	7:00	7:30	8:00	8:30	9:00	9:30	10:00	10:30
CBC	Heartland		Battle of the Blades		Cover Me Canada		The National	
CTV	Once Upon a Time		The Amazing Race		Desperate Housewives		Pan Am	
Global	The Simpsons	The Cleveland Show	The Simpsons	Allen Gregory	Family Guy	American Dad!	The Good Wife	
CTV Two	W5		Movie				CSI: Miami	
Citytv	Last Man Standing	The Quon Dynasty	Extreme Makeover: Home Edition		Beyond Survival		Murdoch Mysteries	

=== Monday ===
PM	7:00	7:30	8:00	8:30	9:00	9:30	10:00	10:30
CBC	Coronation Street	Jeopardy!	Battle of the Blades	This Hour Has 22 Minutes	Being Erica		The National	
CTV	eTalk	The Big Bang Theory	Dancing with the Stars				Castle	
Global	ET Canada	Entertainment Tonight	NCIS		House		Hawaii Five-0	
CTV Two	Degrassi: The Next Generation	Access Hollywood	Sanctuary		Two and a Half Men	Mike & Molly	The Mentalist	
Citytv	How I Met Your Mother	30 Rock	Terra Nova		How I Met Your Mother	Two Broke Girls	The Playboy Club	

=== Tuesday ===
PM	7:00	7:30	8:00	8:30	9:00	9:30	10:00	10:30
CBC	Coronation Street	Jeopardy!	Rick Mercer Report	This Hour Has 22 Minutes	Michael, Tuesdays and Thursdays	The Debaters	The National	
CTV	eTalk	The Big Bang Theory	Dancing with the Stars		Flashpoint		Unforgettable	
Global	ET Canada	Entertainment Tonight	Glee		NCIS: Los Angeles		Parenthood	
CTV Two	Degrassi: The Next Generation	Access Hollywood	The Big Bang Theory	Man Up	The Protector		The Mentalist	
Citytv	The Biggest Loser				New Girl	Raising Hope	Body of Proof	

=== Wednesday ===
PM	7:00	7:30	8:00	8:30	9:00	9:30	10:00	10:30
CBC	Coronation Street	Jeopardy!	Dragons' Den		Camelot		The National	
CTV	eTalk	The Big Bang Theory	The X Factor			Hot in Cleveland	CSI	
Global	ET Canada	Entertainment Tonight	Survivor		Harry's Law		Kitchen Nightmares	
CTV Two	Degrassi: The Next Generation	Access Hollywood	Up All Night	Free Agents	Criminal Minds		Law & Order: SVU	
Citytv	How I Met Your Mother	30 Rock	The Middle	Suburgatory	Modern Family	Happy Endings	Revenge	

=== Thursday ===
PM	7:00	7:30	8:00	8:30	9:00	9:30	10:00	10:30
CBC	Coronation Street	Jeopardy!	The Nature of Things		Doc Zone		The National	
CTV	Charlie's Angels		The Big Bang Theory	Whitney	Grey's Anatomy		The Mentalist	
Global	ET Canada	Entertainment Tonight	The Office	How to Be a Gentleman	Bones		Prime Suspect	
CTV Two	The Vampire Diaries		The X Factor		America's Next Top Model		Criminal Minds	
Citytv	How I Met Your Mother	30 Rock	Community	Parks and Recreation	Person of Interest		Private Practice	

=== Friday ===
PM	7:00	7:30	8:00	8:30	9:00	9:30	10:00	10:30
CBC	Coronation Street	Jeopardy!	Marketplace	Rick Mercer Report	The Fifth Estate		The National	
CTV	eTalk	The Big Bang Theory	Grimm		CSI: NY		Blue Bloods	
Global	ET Canada	Entertainment Tonight	A Gifted Man		I Hate My Teenage Daughter	Happily Divorced	Ringer	
CTV Two	Degrassi: The Next Generation	Access Hollywood	Nikita		Shark Tank		Dateline NBC	
Citytv	How I Met Your Mother	30 Rock	Extreme Makeover: Home Edition		Fringe		Mantracker	

=== Saturday ===
PM	7:00	7:30	8:00	8:30	9:00	9:30	10:00	10:30
CBC	Hockey Night in Canada							
CTV	W5		The Sing-Off				Crimetime Saturday	
Global	16:9		Recipe to Riches		Movies			
CTV Two	The Listener		Flashpoint		Movie			
Citytv	What's Cooking	Glenn Martin, DDS	Rules of Engagement	Dussault Inc.	Movie			

== Top weekly ratings ==
- Note: English Canadian television only by viewers age 2 and up
- "2011-12 National Top Program Reports Archive". bbm.ca. Archived from the original on October 24, 2012.

Week	Name	Viewers (in millions)	Network
August 29-September 4	The Big Bang Theory	2.058	CTV
September 5-September 11	The Big Bang Theory	1.916	CTV
September 12-September 18	The Big Bang Theory	2.575	CTV
September 19-September 25	Two and a Half Men	4.906	CTV
September 26-October 2	The Big Bang Theory	3.693	CTV
October 3-October 9	The Big Bang Theory	3.283	CTV
October 10-October 16	The Big Bang Theory	3.678	CTV
October 17-October 23	The Big Bang Theory	3.550	CTV
October 24-October 30	The Big Bang Theory	3.751	CTV
October 31-November 6	The Big Bang Theory	3.762	CTV
November 7-November 13	The Big Bang Theory	3.483	CTV
November 14-November 20	The Big Bang Theory	3.868	CTV
November 21-November 27	99th Grey Cup	4.384	TSN
November 28-December 4	The Big Bang Theory	2.665	CTV
December 5-December 11	The Big Bang Theory	3.552	CTV
December 12-December 18	Survivor: South Pacific	2.501	Global
December 19-December 25	The X Factor	2.002	CTV
December 26-January 1	2012 World Junior Ice Hockey Championships	2.290	TSN
January 2-January 8	2012 World Junior Ice Hockey Championships	2.946	TSN
January 9-January 15	The Big Bang Theory	3.566	CTV
January 16-January 22	The Big Bang Theory	3.534	CTV
January 23-January 29	The Big Bang Theory	3.348	CTV
January 30-February 5	Super Bowl XLVI	7.280	CTV
February 6-February 12	54th Grammy Awards	4.780	Global
February 13-February 19	The Big Bang Theory	3.537	CTV
February 20-February 26	84th Academy Awards	6.090	CTV
February 27-March 4	The Big Bang Theory	2.791	CTV
March 5-March 11	The Big Bang Theory	3.648	CTV
March 12-March 18	The Amazing Race	2.443	CTV
April 2-April 8	The Big Bang Theory	3.181	CTV
April 9-April 15	The Amazing Race	2.296	CTV
April 16-April 22	The Amazing Race	2.587	CTV
April 23-April 29	The Big Bang Theory	3.170	CTV
April 30-May 6	The Big Bang Theory	3.232	CTV
May 7-May 13	The Big Bang Theory	4.035	CTV
May 14-May 20	Grey's Anatomy	2.671	CTV
May 21-May 27	American Idol	2.812	CTV
May 28-June 3	2012 Stanley Cup Final	2.356	CBC
June 4-June 10	2012 Stanley Cup Final	2.762	CBC
June 11-June 17	Megastunts	3.888	CTV
June 25-July 1	The Big Bang Theory	1.833	CTV
July 2-July 8	The Big Bang Theory	2.094	CTV
July 9-July 15	The Big Bang Theory	1.932	CTV
July 16-July 22	The Big Bang Theory	1.909	CTV
July 23-July 29	2012 Summer Olympics Opening Ceremony	6.354	Various
July 30-August 5	2012 Summer Olympics	2.027	CTV
August 6-August 12	2012 Summer Olympics Closing Ceremony	7.546	Various
August 13-August 19	The Big Bang Theory	1.949	CTV
August 20-August 26	Big Brother	1.778	Global

== By network ==
=== Cancellations/series endings ===
==== YTV ====
- Kid vs. Kat—Series Finale Ended on June 4, 2011, after two seasons.
