= Dana McCauley =

Canadian chef and food writer

Dana McCauley (born July 7, 1966, in Newmarket, Ontario) is a Canadian chef, food writer, food trend tracker, spokesperson, and international corporate food consultant. She is a former food editor for Gardening Life, Homemakers, and Style at Home magazines. She was President of Dana McCauley & Associates Ltd., a company based in Maple, Ontario, which provided services to the food industry, including grocery product development, recipe writing, research, food writing, and food trend tracking and analysis. It was sold to Amy Snider/Whitson, who renamed it The Test Kitchen Incorporated.

McCauley also worked as the executive chef for DineWise, an online gourmet food company.

At the same time, McCauley took a job with Janes Family Foods as their culinary director. In addition, she was cast as an on-air judge on the Food Network Canada original reality series called Recipe to Riches. Her co-judges include Laura Calder, Tony Champman and Galen Weston, Jr. The show was created by Temple Street Productions and aired starting October 2011 on Food Network Canada and Global TV.

She was the founding executive director for Food Starter (now called District Kitchen), a food business incubator and accelerator created by the City of Toronto. It is now operated by Arlene Dickinson's District Ventures. Before leaving Food Starter, she led it to win the Premier's Award for Innovation. In the same year that she was awarded the Women's Executive Network's Top 100 award.

As of 2019, McCauley is the Director of New Venture Creation at the University of Guelph where she helps researchers to create start-up companies based on their lab work.

Since 2017, she has been featured in Canadian media many times, including in the Globe and Mail, National Post and EatNorth as well as dozens of trade magazines and podcasts, such as The Feast, and a SiriusXM show. In 2017 she was recognized as a change agent when she received the WXN Top 100 Most Powerful Women award in the trailblazers and trendsetter category.

== Bibliography ==
McCauley has written four cookbooks: Last Dinner on the Titanic, Noodles Express: Fast and Easy Recipes in 15 to 45 Minutes, Dana's Top Ten Table, and Pantry Raid: Out of the Cupboard Cooking. She has also collaborated on In the Kennedy Style with US etiquette icon Letitia Baldrige, Kennedy Administration White House chef René Verdon and Legendary Brides, also with Baldridge.

== Personal ==
McCauley is married to Toronto chef and restaurateur Martin Kouprie of the restaurant Pangaea. Their son, Oliver Kouprie, is a mechanic.

== Media career ==
McCauley was a featured presenter at Food In Motion and a featured guest speaker at both the Food & Beverage Marketing Conference in Toronto and the Designing and Marketing Food to Boomers Conference hosted by the Guelph Food and Technology Centre. During the late 1990s to the 2010s, she addressed audiences at the Smithsonian Institution, as well as at events held in cities from Honolulu to New York City. She has made many television appearances on shows such as CNN, Fox News, The Today Show, Breakfast Television, Canada AM, and The Leeza Gibbons Show. Print journalists from publications such as The National Post, the Canadian Press wire service, People magazine, Newsweek, and USA Today have interviewed McCauley about her business and her books.

She is also the expert food trend guest on Canada AM.

== Books ==
- 1997 Last Dinner on the Titanic (Hyperion), by Dana McCauley and Rick Archbold.
- 1999 Noodles Express: Fast and Easy Recipes in 15 to 45 Minutes (Random House), by Dana McCauley.
- 2002 Pantry Raid: Out of the Cupboard Cooking (Random House), by Dana McCauley.
- 2007 Dana's Top Ten Table (Harper Collins)
