= Urban Cultivator =

- Industry: Hydroponics
- Founders: Tarren Wolfe, Myles Omand, and Davin MacGregor
- Headquarters: Surrey, British Columbia
- Products: Indoor gardening appliances
- Number of employees: 24
- Website: www.urbancultivator.net

Urban Cultivator is a hydroponics company based in Surrey, British Columbia that creates indoor gardening appliances, which can grow herbs, microgreens, vegetables, and flowers for residences and commercial kitchens. It was founded in 2010 by Tarren Wolfe, Myles Omand, and Davin MacGregor.

Urban Cultivator appeared on the sixth season of the Canadian reality television show, Dragons' Den, and signed a deal with Arlene Dickinson of Venture Communications.

The company has since expanded and its products are currently sold directly to consumers and through various retail dealers in North America, Europe, and Australia.

== History ==
In 2010, Tarren Wolfe, Myles Omand, and Davin MacGregor started Urban Cultivator to create and market a device to allow consumers and businesses to grow plants indoors, and have access to a fresh supply of vegetables.

The three worked together for BC Northern Lights, the sister company of Urban Cultivator, and manufacturers and sellers of indoor hydroponic grow boxes for the medical marijuana community.

== Dragons’ Den ==
Urban Cultivator appeared on season six, episode 14 of Canadian reality television show, Dragons’ Den. Wolfe, Omand, and MacGregor asked for $400,000 for 10%, and met mostly positive feedback, particularly from Robert Herjavec (of The Herjavec Group) and Arlene Dickinson, who expressed the most interest.

A deal was ultimately signed with Arlene Dickinson for $400,000 in services for a 20% equity stake.

== Products ==
Urban Cultivator produces indoor gardening appliances for two sectors: Residential and Commercial.

== Living Produce Aisle ==
By March 2015, Urban Cultivator opened a retail concept store, Living Produce Aisle, in the Vancouver neighbourhood of Yaletown. The store grows and sells microgreens, herbs, and vegetables, as well as smoothies, juices, and salads, to consumers and nearby restaurants.

As of 2025 Living Produce Aisle is permanently closed.
