= 16:9 (disambiguation) =

16:9 is an aspect ratio widely used in television and video.

16:9 may also refer to

- 16:9 (TV series), a Canadian newsmagazine show
- Minor seventh, a musical interval
