= Anaid Productions =

Canadian television production company

Anaïd Productions
- Official logo of 2005 to present
- Industry: Television
- Genre: Television production
- Founded: 1993; 33 years ago
- Founder: Margaret Mardirossian
- Headquarters: Vancouver, British Columbia, Canada
- Number of locations: Vancouver, British Columbia; Edmonton, Alberta
- Owner: Margaret Mardirossian
- Parent: Minds Eye Entertainment (1998–2005); Rogers Communications (2005–present)

Anaid Productions (stylized as Anaïd Productions and ANAÏD PRODUCTIONS) is a Canadian television production company that produces both non-fiction and drama series. It was established in 1993 by Margaret Mardirossian. There are offices in Vancouver, British Columbia and Edmonton, Alberta.

== Shows produced ==
- The Family Restaurant
- The Quon Dynasty
- The Rig
- Mentors
- Taking it Off
- The Liquidator
- The Tourist
- X-Weighted
- X-Weighted Families
