= French Food at Home =

- Genre: Cooking show
- Presented by: Laura Calder
- Theme music composer: Mike O'Neill
- Country of origin: Canada
- Original language: English
- No. of seasons: 3

Production
- Production locations: Halifax, Nova Scotia

Original release
- Network: Food Network Canada

French Food at Home is a cooking show presented by Canadian chef Laura Calder. Filmed in Halifax, Nova Scotia, it aired from 2007-2010 on Food Network Canada, the Asian Food Channel, and the Cooking Channel. It was a lifestyle series featuring simple French home cooking. All 78 episodes were shot in a home kitchen in Canada and include scenes filmed in France, such as trips to the market and glimpses of everyday French food life. The show received the James Beard Foundation Award in 2010. Music for the show was composed by Mike O'Neill.

== Episodes list ==
=== Season 1 ===
- Spring Flavored
- Dinner so Chic
- Charcuterie Inspiration
- French Food for Kids
- Spring Flavors
- French Holiday Dinner
- First Courses
- Dinner Outdoors
- Chateau Memories
- Fish Forever
- Classic Bistro Desserts
- French Food Fast
- Breakfast Abroad
- Country Dinner
- Mediterranean Flavours
- Comfort Food
- Served Family Style
- Bechamel Creations
- Cheese 101
- Chocolate Obsession
- Aromatic Inspiration
- Apero
- Savoury Tarts
- Eggs Anytime
- Stand Alone Salads
- Sweet Tarts
- The Perfect Potato

=== Season 2 ===
- The Sweet Choux Show
- Cooking for One
- French Africa
- Cooking with Wine
- From the French Pantry
- The Bread Show
- French Ways with Vegetables
- France City Tour
- French Fruit Desserts
- The Puff Pasty Show
- The Butter Show
- Simple Terrines
- Simple Classics
- The Olive Show
- French for Dieters
- Celebratory Chocolate Desserts
- Truckstop French
- Tribute to French Canada
- Vegetarian
- Picnic
- Stuffed!
- Girls Dinner
- Reunion Food
- Around Bordeaux Dinner
- Dinner from the Potager
- Salt and Pepper

=== Season 3 ===
- Small Pleasures
- Exotica
- Thrifty
- Grandma's House
- How Grand
- Cozy
- The Slow Show
- Artist Dinner
- Champagne Dinner
- Lazy Daze
- Sunday Lunch
- Summer Buffet
- Confidence Builders
- Woodland Feast
- Cook for a Chef
- Mediterranean Sun
- Moveable Feast
- Gimick-Free
- Free Spirit
- French Barbecue
- The Retro Show
- The Beauty Show
- Life's Luxuries
- Cocktail Dinner
- Well Preserved
- Frenchified
- Dinner at the Chateau (special)

== Awards and nominations ==
2010 : James Beard Foundation Award, New York City (won)

- Television Show, In Studio or Fixed Location

== Broadcasters ==
- Original
  - Food Network Canada
- Syndicate
  - Cooking Channel
