= List of 16×9 episodes =

This is a list of episodes for 16×9, a Canadian investigative journalism television program on the Global Television Network.

== Season 1 (2008/09) ==
33 episodes have aired with a new episode every Sunday.

Episode	Title	Summary	Original airdate
1	The Copycat Killer – The Little Miracle – Pranking Palin		November 30, 2008
2	Model Mystery – The Real Relic Hunter – Ready to Rumble	In a Turkish pop music video, Hayle is acting the role of a distraught lover ready to jump to her death from a balcony. At the end of this video she is saved from killing herself. If only that had been true in real life.	December 7, 2008
3	Superiority Complex? – Flying High – Buried Without a Brain		December 14, 2008
4	Suicide Tourist – Cold War – Jesus of Siberia	A new documentary by an award-winning Canadian filmmaker captures the moment that Craig Ewart takes his last breath on-camera in an assisted suicide. 16x9 shows you the controversial footage and talks to the director of the dramatic new film.	December 21, 2008
5	Superiority Complex? – The Little Miracle – Jesus of Siberia		December 28, 2008
6	Rays of Rash? – Dirty Energy – Girl Gamers	Imagine turning on a light bulb and within 20 minutes you notice skin problems.	January 4, 2009
7	Security Meltdown? – Wolf Man – Justin Time	After a 4-month investigation 16:9 exposes security concerns on some Canadian campuses that house research reactors. In the wrong hands what we uncovered could be potentially disastrous.	January 11, 2009
8	Reaction to Rays – Electrical Shock – Belle of The Ball	After their last story ran on compact fluorescent light bulbs. So in their next story, Allison Vuchnich speaks with the Health Minister and Health Canada about the light bulbs.	January 18, 2009
9	List Loophole – Women at War – Obamania	Thousands of Canadians say signing up for the "Do Not Call" list has left their phones ringing off the hook. Home phones, and for the first time, cell phones are being bombarded with sales pitches.	January 25, 2009
10	Phone Fraud – Faith Healer – Price of a Dream	A Canadian man spent his life's savings to sing at New York's Carnegie Hall with the hopes of launching an international singing career. It's a dream come true for Victoria native Ken Lavigne.	February 1, 2009
11	Rays of Rash – Dirty Energy – Reaction to Rays	Dr. Magda Havas testing all sorts of bulbs for 'dirty electricity'. She measures power quality and radio frequencies that different bulbs give off.	February 8, 2009
12	Eyeonic Man – The Real Slumdogs – The Divine Debate		February 15, 2009
13	The Great Pacific Garbage Patch – Model Mystery – Girl Gamers		February 22, 2009
14	Autism Awakening – Misfortune – Tube Terror		March 1, 2009
15	Beetle Juice – Garbage Patch – Recessionista		March 8, 2009
16	Staying Alive – Tax Dodgers – Cosmic Fate		March 15, 2009
17	Chemical Clothing – Gang Wars – Big House		March 22, 2009
18	Darker Side of Chocolate – Gang Wars II – XY		March 29, 2009
19	Surgical Fire – Fortune's Future – Best Job in the World		April 5, 2009
20	Innocence Stolen – Is Your Spouse Gay? – Future Business Model		April 12, 2009
21	What Happened to Tori? – Robot Army – Hockey Night in Israel		April 19, 2009
22	Water Woes – Audacity Of Tech – Christian the Lion		April 26, 2009
23	Charity Accountability – Nanny Diaries (Part 1) – Nanny Diaries (Part 2)		May 3, 2009
24	Save the Mothers – Labours of Love – Little Miracles		May 10, 2009
25	Taxman – Chemical Clothing – Price of a Dream		May 17, 2009
26	Angels and Demons – Angels and Demons II – The Forgotten		May 24, 2009
27	Mexico Drug Wars – Is Your Spouse Gay? – Together At Last		May 31, 2009
28	Baby Kaylee – Subtle Killer – Foreskin Restoration		June 7, 2009
29	Smoke Alarm – Investor Collapse – Recession Gold Rush		June 14, 2009
30	Sexting – Cyber Terror – 3D Ready		June 21, 2009
31	Mr. Hollywood – Incompatible Kidney – Stonewall Riots		June 28, 2009
32	Goodnight Kiss – Head Noise – The Thriller		July 5, 2009
33	Can Con – Justin Hines – The Best of 16x9		July 12, 2009
