= Carolyn Creswell =

Australian businesswoman and television host

Carolyn Claire Creswell
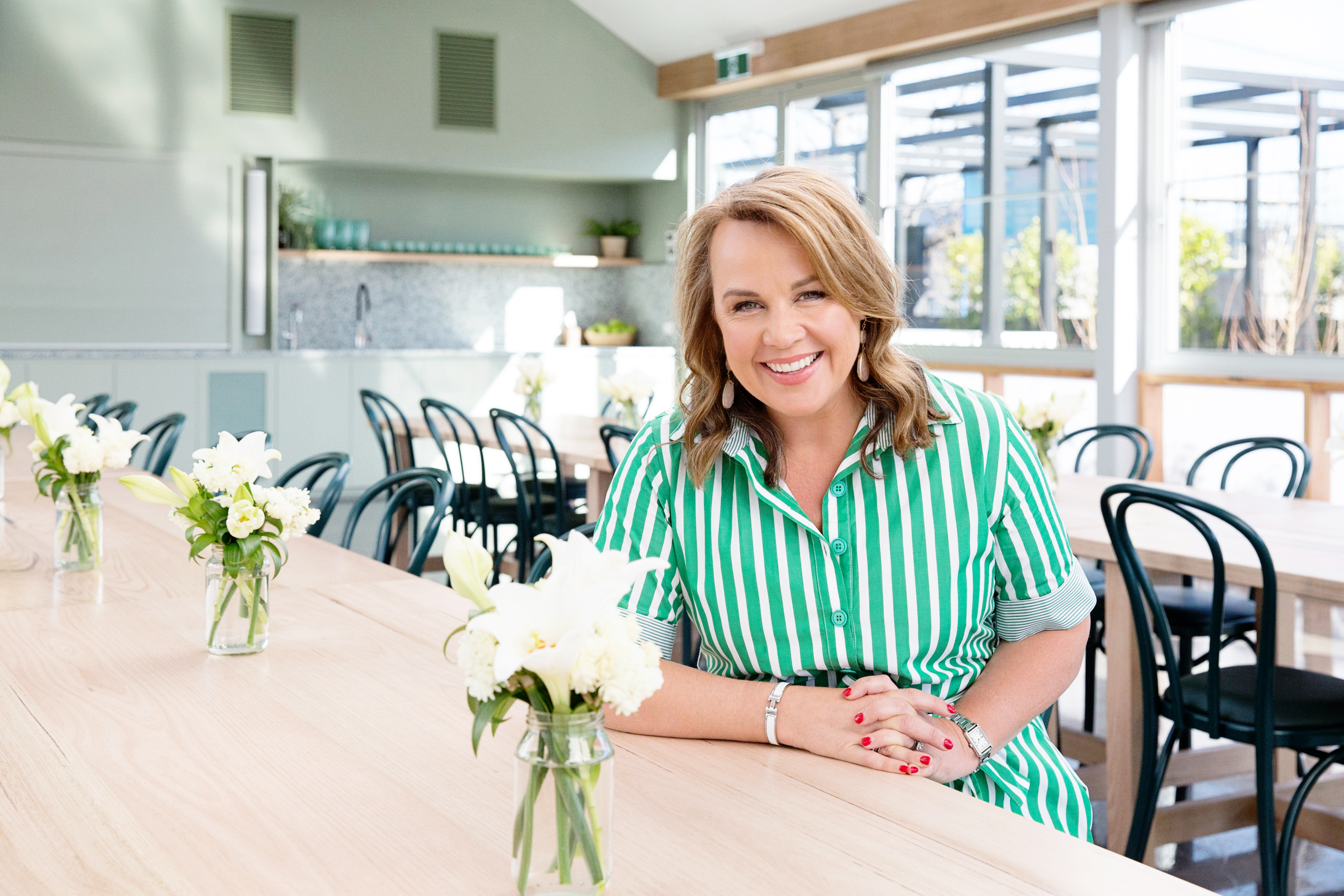
- Creswell in August 2018
- Born: Carolyn Claire Tennent; 30 December 1973 (age 52); Melbourne, Victoria
- Education: Monash University (B.A.); University of London (LLB) (Note: Incomplete, only 1 year completed.)
- Occupations: Founder and Managing Director of the Carman’s Fine Foods
- Years active: 1992–present
- Television: Recipe to Riches
- Spouse: Peter Creswell (m. 3 March 2000) (1967 - present)
- Children: 4
- Parent(s): Marcia (1944-) and David Tennent (1942-)
- Website: https://carmanskitchen.com.au

Carolyn Claire Creswell (née Tennent, born 30 December 1973) is an Australian businesswoman and television host. She is best known as the founder of Australian brand Carman's Fine Foods. Carolyn is currently one of the leading muesli bar companies in Australia, found in most major retailers..

== Early life and education ==
Creswell was born and raised in Melbourne Australia; her parents are Marcia and David Tennent. Creswell graduated from St Catherine's School in Toorak, before attending Monash University where she received her BA in Arts in 1994. She completed a year of a law degree at the University of London in 1996.

== Career ==
=== Carman's Fine Foods ===
At the age of 18, Creswell purchased a small local hand-made muesli business for $1,000, whom she had worked and founded her own brand, Carman's Fine Foods. In 1993, Carman's Fine Foods obtained its first interstate distributor in New South Wales. The turning point for Creswell came when Coles Supermarkets agreed to trial her muesli in some of its Melbourne stores. By 1997, Coles stocked Carman's muesli nationally; Woolworths followed in 2001. In 2002 Carman's Fine Foods expanded into the muesli bar category. In 2003, an Austrade Export Development Grant aided Carman's introduction to international buyers. As of 2019, Carman's Fine Foods is an Australian brand distributed in more than 35 countries around the world including China, Hong Kong, Malaysia and Singapore.

=== Television ===
In 2013 Creswell joined Network Ten as a mentor and judge on Recipe to Riches alongside Darren Robertson, Russel Howcroft, and Jess Gill. Creswell has also appeared on the panel of Network Ten's The Project and Studio Ten.

=== Recognition and awards ===
- 2007 Ernst & Young's Young Entrepreneur of the Year Award.
- 2007 Finalist Telstra Victorian Business Woman of the Year!!!
- 2008 Finalist Veuve Cliquot Australian Business Woman of the Year!!!
- 2009 Finalist InStyle Women of Style Awards
- 2009 Commendee (Large Services) Governor of Victoria Export Awards
- 2012 Telstra Australia Business Woman of the Year

== Philanthropy ==
Creswell was formerly a board member for the Victorian Equal Opportunity and Human Rights Commission (2009-2012), Stephanie Alexander Kitchen Garden Foundation (2010-2017) and the Human Rights Law Centre (2015-2018). She's currently an ambassador of the Asylum Seekers Resource Centre and Smiling Mind and the patron of St Kilda Gatehouse. Creswell is also a graduate member of the Australian Institute of Company Directors and the Young Presidents' Organization. Among other roles, Creswell currently works on the professional keynote circuit.

== Personal life ==
Creswell lives in Melbourne with her husband Peter Creswell and four children.
