= The Family Restaurant =

- Starring: Psalios Family (S1-2); Quon Family (S3)
- Country of origin: Canada
- No. of seasons: 3
- No. of episodes: 39

Production
- Running time: approx. 30 minutes

Original release
- Network: Food Network Canada
- Release: 2005 – 2009

Related
- The Quon Dynasty

The Family Restaurant is a Canadian reality television series, which aired on Food Network Canada between 2005 and 2009.

Profiling family-owned restaurants in the Edmonton, Alberta area, the show's first two seasons focused on the Psalios family chain of Greek restaurants, while its third and final season focused on the Quon family chain of Chinese restaurants, including The Lingnan. The Quon family were later featured in their own spinoff series, The Quon Dynasty, on Citytv.

The series was produced by Anaid Productions and distributed by Picture Box Distribution. The Quon family season was also carried by WE tv in the United States in 2011.
