= The Liquidator (TV series) =

- Genre: Reality Television
- Theme music composer: Brent J Cooper
- Composer: Brent J Cooper
- Country of origin: Canada
- No. of episodes: 91 Episodes

Production
- Running time: 22 Minutes
- Production companies: Anaid Productions; Rogers Media

Original release
- Network: OLN
- Release: July 5, 2012 – November 30, 2015

The Liquidator is a Canadian reality television series that aired on the Canadian specialty channel OLN. The series was filmed in and around Vancouver, British Columbia and was produced by Anaid Productions. It was cancelled in 2016.

The Liquidator originally premiered on July 5, 2012 on OLN. For its third season, the series expanded to 26 episodes, up from 13 episodes in each of the two previous seasons, and also featured additional cities across Canada. The series has since been extended to a total of 39 episodes for season 4. Production on the 39-episode season completed and premiered on OLN in fall 2015.

== Summary ==
The Liquidator follows the daily life of Jeff Schwarz, the star of the series, as he buys and sells discarded or unwanted merchandise. The series focuses on Jeff's negotiating (or "haggling") skills as he hunts for bargains and tries to get the lowest possible price on merchandise. Jeff follows leads and negotiates deals for the merchandise which is then sold by him and his staff at Direct Liquidation, a 30,000-square-foot warehouse in Burnaby, British Columbia which is owned and operated by Jeff and his wife, or in some cases through an auction.

== International broadcast ==
The Liquidator was acquired by Discovery International for its DMAX channels in Europe. The series is now available via the Discovery channel in various countries across Europe, including the United Kingdom Spain, Portugal, the Netherlands, Belgium, Sweden, Finland, Norway, Denmark, Italy, France, Russia, and in Israel.

The show was acquired by PPI Releasing for broadcast syndication in the United States in 2021 and has been airing on select Fox, MyNetworkTV, The CW, and various independent stations since then.

== Episode list ==
Season	Episodes	Season premiere	Season finale
1	13	July 5, 2012	September 27, 2012
2	13	November 8, 2012	February 21, 2013
3	26	June 27, 2013	March 6, 2014
4	39	January 8, 2015	November 30, 2015

=== Season 1: 2012 ===
No. in Series	No. in Season	Title	Original Air Date
1	1	"Bricks And Mortals"	July 5, 2012
Jeff hosts an auction after walking into a potentially lucrative deal.
2	2	"Heads… Or Tail Between Legs"	July 12, 2012
Jeff falls in love with a monster statue made of motorbike parts.
3	3	"Everything Must Go"	July 19, 2012
Jeff surprises his staff with unannounced shipments and frantically tries to sell off the merchandise once it arrives.
4	4	"The Flip"	July 26, 2012
Jeff starts flipping merchandise before taking possession.
5	5	"Of Mensch And Men"	August 2, 2012
Jeff goes crazy when he comes out on the losing end of a pricey electronics deal.
6	6	"Turn Over"	August 9, 2012
A pretty young librarian-in-training gets initiated at Direct Liquidation.
7	7	"Up In Smoke"	August 16, 2012
Jeff scoops up a shipment of furniture that might have been used to sell drugs and searches to find a buyer.
8	8	"No Way, Jose"	August 23, 2012
Jeff has a major shipment on the way with no more room left in his warehouse and must convince Jose to share his warehouse space.
9	9	"Storage Locker Roulette"	August 30, 2012
Jeff gambles on a series of storage lockers.
10	10	"Dealmakers Anonymous"	September 6, 2012
Jeff buys a shipment of Asian noodles that are about to expire.
11	11	"A Chip Off The Old Block"	September 13, 2012
Jeff's son Nick convinces his dad to partner on a new T-shirt line. Daniel takes on the management of a Pop-Up store.
12	12	"Settling The Score"	September 20, 2012
Jeff races to get top dollar for a warehouse full of dollar store junk. Jose plots to get even for the pallets Jeff snuck into his warehouse.
13	13	"On The Block"	September 27, 2012
Jeff decides to hold the mother-of-all auctions but a visit from local by-law officers puts his whole plan in jeopardy.

=== Season 2: 2012-2013 ===
No. In Series	No. In Season	Title	Original Air Date
14	1	"Risky Business"	November 8, 2012
Jeff makes the biggest gamble of his career bidding for a truckload of high-end electronics that have been damaged in transit.
15	2	"Has The Master Lost His Mojo?"	November 15, 2012
Jeff takes delivery of a massive load of dubious merchandise and his staff starts to worry. Meanwhile, a planned auction of high-end goods teeters on the brink of disaster.
16	3	"No Rest For The Wicked"	November 22, 2012
Jeff is stressed out from making deals non-stop. After reaching a breaking point, he reluctantly lets his family take him on a vacation but struggles to relax.
17	4	"A Matter Of Trust"	November 29, 2012
Jeff negotiates for goods at an Italian gelato café that appears to have something brewing on the side. Jeff makes other deals for dodgy Chinese mattresses and wicker furniture.
18	5	"Collecting Cash"	December 6, 2012
Jeff finally decides to part with his beloved Motorcycle Monster statue and a fellow-collector tempts him with even more novelty attractions.
19	6	"Man In The Middle"	December 13, 2012
Jeff is approached by a man with a batch of tuxedos to sell and plays middleman to bring together a series of buyers and sellers.
20	7	"Tough Sell"	January 10, 2013
A big deal gives Jeff more trouble than he bargained for.
21	8	"A Hand Up"	January 17, 2013
After Jose faces the loss of his business, Jeff helps him find a way back into the game. Jose learns that there's always a price to pay for a hand up from Jeff.
22	9	"The Floor"	January 24, 2013
Jeff pressures his staff to fit his recent impulse purchases into an already overcrowded warehouse. Meanwhile, a friend talks Jeff into buying weird merchandise.
23	10	"You Get What You Pay For"	January 31, 2013
Jeff jumps on tempting deals and tries to sell fine art, antique musical instruments and brand-name fashion.
24	11	"Eye Candy"	February 7, 2013
Jeff gets talked into buying a mangy stuffed polar bear that could prove difficult to sell.
25	12	"Good Buys And Good-Byes"	February 14, 2013
Jeff learns a bitter lesson when an old "friend" steals a lucrative deal right out from under him. Meanwhile, much-loved employee Christine departs Direct Liquidation.
26	13	"Man Toys"	February 21, 2013
Jeff's makes a big promise and decides to host an auction to sell used karts when a local go-kart track goes out of business.

=== Season 3: 2013-2014 ===
No. In Series	No. In Season	Title	Original Air Date
27	1	"Bailiff Booty"	June 27, 2013
Jeff has one day to clear out a Chinese grocery store full of exotic and vile stock.
28	2	"Armed To The Rafters"	July 4, 2013
Jeff spends thousands on a military warehouse package deal that includes a decommissioned .50 caliber machine gun.
29	3	"Size Matters"	July 11, 2013
Jeff makes an impulse buy. Meanwhile, Daniel ends up with a truckload of shoes that are all the same size.
30	4	"Tongue Twisted"	July 19, 2013
Jeff takes a gamble in trying to sell some broken pianos, an assortment of pickled peppers, and a collection of ornamental seashells.
31	5	"The Irregulars"	July 25, 2013
Deals with some regulars leave Jeff looking to sell a baby grand, used staging furniture, and a collection of ugly jeans.
32	6	"Belly Up"	August 1, 2013
The purchase of a warehouse full of electronics has Jeff working against a tight deadline.
33	7	"Friends With Benefits"	August 8, 2013
Jeff has a face-off with regular customer Jose and contends with several regulars looking for deals.
34	8	"The More, The Barrier"	August 15, 2013
Jeff gets involved in a bidding war against his own customers.
35	9	"Brief Encounters"	August 22, 2013
Jeff dons a suit and tie in an effort to close a deal for underwear.
36	10	"I’d Bet The Pot"	August 29, 2013
A deal for a large inventory of hydroponics equipment brings Jeff some unusual customers.
37	11	“He Works Hard For The Money”	September 5, 2013
Jeff's sales skills are put to the test when he's faced with moving a live goat and a truckload of broken guitars.
38	12	“What’s Your Beef?”	September 13, 2013
Jeff pursues a store full of frozen meat. Then, a heated round with an art dealer gets Jeff riled up.
39	13	“Phone A Friend”	September 19, 2013
Jeff looks to his go-to guys when he finds himself stuck with a truckload of B-grade lumber and other assorted items.
40	14	“California Dealin”	November 21, 2013
A collector's warehouse full of mystery antiques tempts Jeff, but he has to drive to California to see if it is the real deal.
41	15	“Coffin Up Cash”	November 28, 2013
Jeff fills the warehouse with handicap scooters and a coffin.
42	16	“The Smell Of Money”	December 5, 2013
Jeff commits to a high-stakes storage locker auction and a risky plan to sell off a down-and-out restaurant.
43	17	“What Women Want”	December 12, 2013
Jeff's tries to move women's merchandise.
44	18	“Operation: Liquidate”	January 9, 2014
Jeff buys four truckloads of TV-set props and, with nowhere to put the goods, the staff tries to pull off the biggest outdoor sale in Liquidator history.
45	19	“Down... But Not Out”	January 16, 2014
Jeff tries to profit from an exhausting string of deals with Wayne. Meanwhile, a woodworking auction does not go as planned.
46	20	“Crossing The Line”	January 23, 2014
Jeff scoops a deal from Wayne, has a strange encounter in a sex shop, and then tries to sell an aging accordion to his own mother.
47	21	“Bail Out”	January 30, 2014
Jeff buys a load of cheap crafting supplies.
48	22	“Taken For A Ride”	February 6, 2014
Jeff falls hard for a vintage motorbike. Then when things go wrong with a mechanic, he has to turn to Sheldon the Bailiff to get it back.
49	23	“Treasure Or Trash?”	February 13, 2014
Jeff wears down sellers by trash-talking their merchandise, then tries to convince buyers that industrial pressure gauges and cheap pink T-shirts are treasures.
50	24	“Rotten Timing”	February 20, 2014
Jeff gambles on a series of end-of-the-line deals in hopes of a big payday.
51	25	“Hairy Situation”	February 27, 2014
Jeff makes a deal for fur coats and risks his reputation on a Hollywood memorabilia auction.
52	26	“Redneck Round-Up”	March 6, 2014
Jeff and Daniel travel to the California desert to visit an abandoned town, meet slot machine collectors, and make a deal on 30,000 wine corks.

=== Season 4: 2015 ===
No. In Series	No. In Season	Title	Original Air Date
53	1	"Sink or Swim"	January 8, 2015
When Jeff loses the key item in an upcoming auction – a yacht worth a quarter-million dollars – will he also lose his customers, or can he find a new centerpiece in time?
54	2	"King of Scrap"	January 15, 2015
Jeff has the knack for turning trash into treasure, but when he buys a load of native artifacts he doesn’t even want in order to secure a future deal, he has to think creatively to turn a profit.
55	3	"Measuring Up"	January 22, 2015
Jeff loves showing newbies the ropes – but will a nervous first-time liquidator end up teaching him a thing or two?
56	4	"Big flipping deal"	January 29, 2015
Flipping a deal is Jeff's favorite way to make quick cash – but when Jeff tries to sell a huge load of dancewear, the flip goes flop. Will selling the product piecemeal be worth the extra effort?
57	5	"Hare Raising Deals"	February 5, 2015
When a rabbit shelter asks Jeff to pay more than he should for a load of donated clothing, will Jeff sacrifice his own profit for the baby bunnies, or can he find a way to help the bunnies while still helping himself?
58	6	"Going, Going... Bong"	February 12, 2015
When Jeff buys a boatload of bongs, his first instinct is to put them on the shelves of Direct Liquidation. But after his regular customers don’t bite, how will Jeff get these bongs long gone?
59	7	"Doll-Ars to Dough-Nuts"	February 19, 2015
Liquidating the contents of a restaurant should be easy – but the equipment is in such terrible condition Jeff can’t even recover his costs – until he tries a new tactic.
60	8	"The Orient Distress"	February 26, 2015
After receiving a load of rotten furniture, Jeff goes all the way to Indonesia in a bid to get his money back. But once he's face-to-face with the shady manufacturer, will Jeff's temper get the better of him?
61	9	"Lost In Persuasion"	March 5, 2015
Jeff only has a few days in Indonesia to fill up a container of furniture, but his tough-guy negotiating style doesn’t fly with the locals. Will Jeff be able to change up his game in time?
62	10	"In The Schwarz Team"	March 12, 2015
Jeff's empire is growing, but when his second store's Grand Opening looks like it might end up being a bland opening, will Jeff's micromanaging turn things around—or turn everyone off?
63	11	"Show Me The Moo-La"	March 19, 2015
When Apprentice Daniel starts making thousand-dollar deals without checking with Jeff first, will Daniel's inexperience cost Jeff money? Or will Jeff have to re-evaluate Daniel's role at Direct Liquidation?
64	12	"Hustle Apostle"	March 26, 2015
A priest, a rabbi, and Jeff walk into a dorm, but only one of them walks away with a building full of falling-apart furniture. The joke's on Jeff as he tries to turn old couches into cash.
65	13	"Cagey Dealing"	April 2, 2015
When Jeff finds out a risky high-tech deal he bought is worth hundreds of thousands of dollars, will he flip it for fast cash or go for the gold?
66	14	"Pimping Iron"	April 9, 2015
After dropping $50,000 for high-end gym equipment that won’t sell, Jeff calls in help to get out of the deal. But will the cavalry arrive prepared to help - or to do battle?
67	15	"Cut Me A Deal"	April 16, 2015
When a collector brings in a couple of heavies to intimidate Jeff into giving him a good deal, will Jeff manage to beat the guy up on price without getting a free pair of concrete shoes in the bargain?
68	16	"Stripped Bare"	April 23, 2015
It's a sexy dream come true for Jeff as he liquidates a lingerie shop but will he and Daniel be so wowed by the women customers they end up giving away the profit?
69	17	"Desperate Measures"	April 30, 2015
When a competitor shows up at Jeff's door with a truckload of mattresses, will pretending he bought the wrong product save Jeff money or enrage the seller?
70	18	"Jaded"	May 5, 2015
When Jeff pulls a dirty trick on a mattress competitor, will it save him a bunch of cash or get him in a bunch of trouble with the seller?
71	19	"Clean Sweep"	May 13, 2015
When Jeff buys a carful of clothes he doesn’t want to help out a charity, will he be able to trick a greenhorn liquidator into getting him out of the deal?
72	20	"Sweeten the Deal"	May 18, 2015
Jeff's skills are put to the test as he tries to sell dozens of skids of candy that will expire in just a few days.
73	21	"The Blind Side"	June 10, 2015
When a partner makes a deal – using Jeff's money – for a bunch of dirty restaurant equipment, it's up to Jeff to get it sold – fast!
74	22	"Floor Your Friends"	June 10, 2015
When Jeff decides to put employee Tom in charge of a huge hardwood flooring deal, will Tom rise to the challenge? Or will the only thing on the rise be Jeff's blood pressure?
75	23	"Eyes on the Prize"	June 10, 2015
When a five-ton truck full of merchandise pulls up that Jeff doesn’t remember buying, not only does he have to figure out a buyer – he has to find the seller, too.
76	24	"The Right Combination"	June 17, 2015
When too many vendors answer his call for coin-operated lockers, Jeff finds himself with hundreds more than he needs, and no place to store them.
77	25	"Worth His Salt"	July 29, 2015
When Jeff forgets to book staff for an auction, will he be able to do the jobs of clerk, cashier, locker cracker, and auctioneer by himself?
78	26	"Profit Wars"	July 29, 2015
When Jeff needs to turn a mountain of weapons into some quick cash, he turns to his auctioneer associate Sam to help him out. But when Sam sniffs weakness, will he go for Jeff's throat?
85	27	"Palm Trees and Face Palms"	September 10, 2015
Jeff is left high and dry in California when he tries to help his friends stage a huge estate sale there. Will he pull off a desert miracle, or watch his profits disappear like a mirage?
86	28	"Kink In The Road"	September 17, 2015
Jeff's all tied up in knots when a chance house call to a Palm Springs collector leads him into a dungeon full of leather bondage gear.
81	29	"Flip Flop"	September 24, 2015
When Jeff only has 8 hours to sell a hotel's worth of falling-apart furniture, will he manage to turn a pile of garbage into gold? Or are these tables only fit for the trash?
79	30	"Not My First Rodeo"	October 1, 2015
Jeff and Daniel hit the road hoping to pick up out-of-the-way deals for almost nothing, but a grizzled rodeo vet shows them that some small town guys can be big-time negotiators.
80	31	"Heads and Tails"	October 8, 2015
When the company next door wants to unload $100k worth of motors, Jeff has to decide whether he wants to be a good neighbor and make friends – or make money.
87	32	"Sock it to Me"	October 15, 2015
Jeff gets saddled with a container full of unfashionable socks that no one in town will touch, until he decides that honesty isn’t the most profitable policy.
82	33	"Bucked Off"	October 22, 2015
When Jeff finds negotiating with a couple of professional pickers too easy, his warning system begins to go off. Will Jeff figure out the catch in time, or will he fall headfirst into their trap?
83	34	"Toolin Around"	October 29, 2015
Jeff is left high and dry in California when he tries to help his friends stage a huge estate sale there. Will he pull off a desert miracle, or watch his profits disappear like a mirage?
84	35	"José ’em Down"	November 5, 2015
When Jeff tries to make a deal at his vet's office, his business goes to the dogs. Will he fare any better by letting José take the reins on the next one, or will his best frenemy sabotage him?
89	36	"Street Cred"	November 12, 2015
When Jeff and Daniel discover their Toronto auction is a sinking ship, they hit the streets in a wild attempt to bail it out.
88	37	"Straddle the Saddle"	November 19, 2015
Jeff goes behind his friend's back to make a deal with his wife for Western props. But will they be caught red-handed before the deal is sealed?
90	38	"A Passage to India"	November 26, 2015
Jeff and Daniel travel to India in search of hot deals. The country is hot alright, but they quickly learn that bargains are hard to come by, even with the help of their pretty translator. Jeff inches along the path to enlightenment on deals for puppets and saris, until a hardware store owner won’t budge in negotiations for a bunch of tools.
91	39	"The Schwarz that Broke the Camel’s Back"	December 3, 2015
Jeff and Daniel continue their Indian odyssey in Jodhpur, and learn that rules are made to be broken. Jeff is henpecked by lady customers when he stages a sari sale in the village square, then goes head to head with a doctor of “turbanology.” A furniture seller's fluency in English comes as a surprise, and Jeff's loose lips threaten to sabotage the biggest deal of his entire trip.
