= Guys with Kids =

2012–2013 American TV series

- Promotional image
- Genre: Sitcom
- Created by: Jimmy Fallon; Charlie Grandy; Amy Ozols
- Starring: Anthony Anderson; Jesse Bradford; Zach Cregger; Tempestt Bledsoe; Erinn Hayes; Jamie-Lynn Sigler
- Theme music composer: Amy Miles; Michael Robertson
- Composer: John MacDonald
- Country of origin: United States
- Original language: English
- No. of seasons: 1
- No. of episodes: 17

Production
- Executive producers: Jimmy Fallon; Charlie Grandy; Amy Ozols; Rick Weiner; Kenny Schwartz
- Camera setup: Multi-camera
- Running time: 22 minutes
- Production companies: Holiday Road; Charlie Grandy Productions; Universal Television; Open 4 Business Productions

Original release
- Network: NBC
- Release: September 12, 2012 – February 27, 2013

Guys with Kids is an American sitcom television series that aired on NBC, from September 11, 2012, to February 27, 2013, as part of the 2012–13 television schedule. The series was created by Jimmy Fallon, Charlie Grandy, and Amy Ozols, and stars Anthony Anderson, Jesse Bradford, Zach Cregger, Jamie-Lynn Sigler, Erinn Hayes, and Tempestt Bledsoe. The series chronicles the lives of three friends, and their respective partners, as they raise their children in a modern environment.

Guys with Kids also aired on Global as part of the 2012–13 Canadian network television schedule. Guys with Kids also aired on Comedy Central India.

== Cast ==
=== Main cast ===
- Anthony Anderson as Gary, father of Yoda, Clark, and twin boys, Robbie and GJ (Gary Jr.).
- Jesse Bradford as Chris Campbell, father to Ernie
- Zach Cregger as Nick Theyer, father to Violet and Freddie
- Tempestt Bledsoe as Marny, wife of Gary
- Erinn Hayes as Sheila, divorced from Chris
- Jamie-Lynn Sigler as Emily Theyer, wife of Nick

=== Children ===
- Brian Mganga as Clark
- Marleik Walker II as Yoda
- Mykayla Sohn as Violet

=== Recurring cast ===
Cast members appearing in at least two episodes include:

- Brian Posehn as Victor, the apartment building's maintenance man
- Kareem Abdul-Jabbar as himself
- Fiona Gubelmann as Sage, Chris's girlfriend prior to his relationship with Shelia
- Mark Consuelos as Andy, Ernie's nanny

== Development and production ==
NBC placed a 13-episode order in May 2012.

It was announced in June 2012 that Sara Rue, who portrayed Sheila in the original pilot, would be replaced by Erinn Hayes, a change necessitated when ABC decided to pick up the comedy Malibu Country, which also starred Rue.

The series ran from September 12, 2012, to February 27, 2013. The series aired in Canada on Global, premiering one day early, on September 11, 2012.

On November 15, 2012, NBC announced it has ordered four more episodes, bringing the series to a total of 17 episodes.

On May 9, 2013, NBC canceled the series after one season.

== Episodes ==
No.	Title	Directed by	Written by	Original release date	Prod. code	US viewers (millions)
1	"Pilot"	Scott Ellis	Story by : Jimmy Fallon, Charlie Grandy & Amy Ozols; Teleplay by : Charlie Grandy	September 12, 2012	101	6.25
Chris stands up to his ex-wife Shelia when he wants to go on a date.
2	"Chris' New Girlfriend"	Michael Lembeck	Keith Heisler	September 26, 2012	103	4.84
Chris has a new girlfriend who used to date Nick. It is later revealed that Nick used the same first date for multiple women.
3	"Marny Wants A Girl"	Ken Whittingham	Courtney Lilly	October 3, 2012	104	4.76
Marny decides she wants another kid: a daughter. A fight breaks out during the CPR class that Shelia forces everyone to participate in.
4	"The Standoff"	Michael Lembeck	Story by : Charlie Grandy; Teleplay by : Rick Wiener & Kenny Schwartz	October 10, 2012	102	4.19
Gary tries to discipline Yoda with unconventional tactics, including setting up a slip in slide in the middle of the apartment. Nick learns that there is more to a school project and gets competitive.
5	"Gary's Day Off"	Ken Whittingham	Matt Lawton	October 17, 2012	105	4.41
Shelia moves out of her old place with Chris, Nick and Gary's help so that Chris can have his Giants tickets back. Marny gives Gary a day off which results in her needing help from Emily.
6	"Apartment Halloween"	Leonard R. Garner, Jr.	Donald Diego	October 24, 2012	106	3.83
After the new co-op board president tells Nick he can't have his hall haunted house, Shelia and Nick set her up with Chris to get what they want. Meanwhile, Chris wants Shelia to become friends with Nick.
7	"The Bathroom Incident"	Michael Lembeck	Charlie Grandy	October 31, 2012	107	3.62
Freddie and Ernie lock themselves inside a bathroom causing Nick to realize he needs to be better prepared. Emily helps Gary organize his apartment.
8	"First Birthday"	Leonard R. Garner, Jr.	Alan R. Cohen & Alan Freedland	November 14, 2012	108	3.91
Ernie's first birthday arrives and Shelia and Chris fight over the birthday party.
9	"Thanksgiving"	Betsy Thomas	Keith Heisler	November 21, 2012	109	3.47
Shelia hosts a crazy thanksgiving as Gary waits on line for three days to get a new TV.
10	"Christmas"	Michael Lembeck	Story by : Charlie Grandy; Teleplay by : Rick Wiener & Kenny Schwartz	December 5, 2012	110	3.59
Gary and Marnie get drunk and insult Emily and Nick's idea of a romantic date.
11	"First Word"	Leonard R. Garner, Jr.	Story by : Rick Weiner & Kenny Schwartz; Teleplay by : Charlie Grandy	January 2, 2013	111	4.39
As Shelia sticks around due to waiting on Ernie's first word, Nick and Chris reminisce on the past, including the night that Nick got engaged to Emily while Chris was dating Sage (Fiona Gubelmann), the night that Violet was born and they met Gary and Marnie, Chris's wedding to Shelia, the night that Gary chipped his tooth, and the night that Chris had told his friends that he was getting a divorce. In the present, Nick and Emily try looking up Sage.
12	"Marny's Dad"	Betsy Thomas	Courtney Lilly	January 9, 2013	112	3.97
Gary learns why Marnie's dad doesn't like him when he comes to visit.
13	"Me Time"	Michael Lembeck	Alan R. Cohen & Alan Freedland	January 30, 2013	114	2.93
Marnie wants some alone time as Shelia, Nick, Chris, and Emily start competing in trivia nights at the bar.
14	"The Will"	Mark Cendrowski	Lauren Caltagirone	February 6, 2013	113	3.20
After suffering a health problem, Marnie and Gary decide whom to leave their kids to in their will. Chris becomes overwhelmed by Shelia's nanny, Andy (Mark Consuelos).
15	"Gary's Idea"	Leonard R. Garner, Jr.	Lauren Caltagirone & Donald Diego	February 13, 2013	115	2.85
With Chris deciding to change something in his life, he decided to pick up a new hobbie. Nick and Emily's babysitter Stacy (Sara Paxton) likes Chris.
16	"Rare Breed"	Leonard R. Garner, Jr.	Story by : Charlie Grandy; Teleplay by : Rick Weiner & Kenny Schwartz	February 20, 2013	116	2.83
Gary tries to be a stay at home dad while working on his wrapkin.
17	"Divorce Party"	Betsy Thomas	Matt Lawton	February 27, 2013	117	3.07
Marnie's sister Bridget (Keshia Knight Pulliam) comes to town and Marnie hires her to work with Gary. When Nick learned that Shelia and Chris were thinking of having another baby, he decided to host a divorce party and invites Sage. Shelia and Sage meet when Chris stayed at the party. The show ends with a cliff-hanger.

== Reception ==
=== Critical response ===
Guys with Kids received generally negative reviews from critics. On Metacritic, the show received a score of 38 out of 100, from 25 reviews, indicating "generally unfavorable reviews". Rotten Tomatoes rated season 1 as 7% based on reviews from 30 critics, with an average rating of 3.4/10 and the critical consensus reads: "Worthless and abysmal, Guys with Kids is pitiful in its lack of humor and plot."

Glenn Garvin of the Miami Herald was only one of a few who gave a positive review, saying "Guys with Kids is a perfect confection of witty dialogue and slapstick action." Matt Zoller Seitz of New York Magazine stated "I expected to hate Guys with Kids... My animosity faded after about five minutes, when it became clear that the show wasn't terribly interested in the kids." Diane Wertz of Newsday gave it a D and stated "Nothing to see here. Move on." Matt Rouse of TV Guide wrote, "The season's most depressingly generic and retro sitcom, so squishy and lacking in edge it might as well been written in nerf".

=== Accolades ===
On December 11, 2012, Anthony Anderson was nominated for an NAACP Image Award, as Outstanding Actor in a Comedy Series. The award went to Don Cheadle for his work on Showtime's House of Lies.

== See also ==
- House Husbands, a 2012 Australian television comedy with a similar premise
