= The Lingnan =

Chinese restaurant in Canada

Coordinates: 53°32′59″N 113°29′58″W

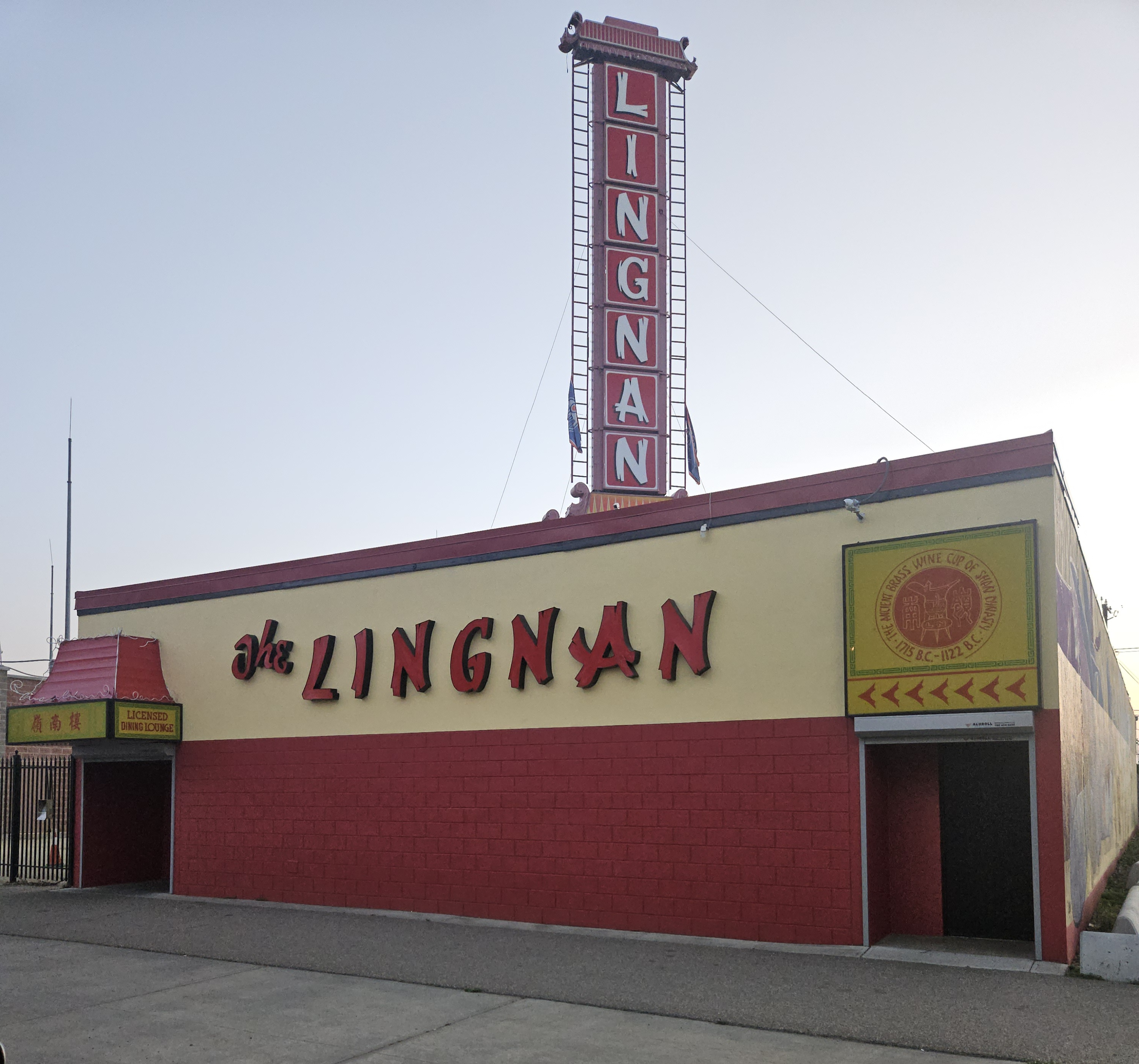
The façade and signage of the Lingnan.

The Lingnan is a Chinese restaurant in Edmonton, Alberta. It is the second-oldest existing restaurant in Edmonton, having opened in 1947, and mainly serves westernized Cantonese cuisine.

The Lingnan has been owned by the Quon family since its founding and has been in its present location in Central McDougall, Edmonton since the 1960s. Since 2002, the Lingnan has been solely owned by Kinman Quon, who runs it with his wife Amy and their family. The restaurant celebrated its 75th anniversary in 2022. Amy Quon also owned the downtown Edmonton Chinese restaurant Chicken for Lunch, which operated for 32 years before closing in 2024.

The Lingnan and the Quon family were the subject of the third season of the Food Network Canada television show The Family Restaurant, which was spun off into the Citytv show The Quon Dynasty. The restaurant was also featured in a scene from the film Before I Change My Mind.
