= Under New Management (TV series) =

Canadian television series

Under New Management is a Canadian reality television series that premiered on CBC Television on March 15, 2019. Hosted by Canadian venture capitalist Arlene Dickinson, the series features Dickinson guiding aspiring business owners through the process of buying a company.

CBC broadcast the series pilot in 2017 as a special, with two investors who were each guided by Dickinson through three potential businesses. The network announced in 2018 that it had ordered a full series, which started on March 15, 2019.

== Episodes ==
| No. overall | No. in season | Title | Directed by | Written by | Original release date |
|---|---|---|---|---|---|
| 1 | 1 | "His Money, Her Time" | Unknown | Unknown | March 15, 2019 |
| 2 | 2 | "Escape the Cubicle" | Unknown | Unknown | March 22, 2019 |
| 3 | 3 | "Stepping-Stone Business" | Unknown | Unknown | March 29, 2019 |
| 4 | 4 | "Once in a Lifetime Opportunity" | Unknown | Unknown | April 5, 2019 |
