= Who Do You Think You Are? (Canadian TV series) =

2007 television documentary series

- Genre: Documentary
- Creative director: Daniel Riley
- Starring: Various
- Theme music composer: Mark Sayer-Wade
- Composer: Joel S. Silver
- Country of origin: Canada
- No. of seasons: 1
- No. of episodes: 13

Production
- Executive producers: Laszlo Barna; Steven Silver
- Running time: 30 minutes
- Production company: Barna-Alper Productions

Original release
- Network: CBC Television
- Release: 11 October 2007 – 31 January 2008

Who Do You Think You Are? is a Canadian television documentary series, which aired on CBC Television during the 2007-2008 television season. It was on Thursday evenings at 7:30 p.m. starting October 11, 2007. Based on the earlier BBC series Who Do You Think You Are?, each episode profiled a Canadian celebrity tracing their family tree. The series was announced in June 2007 as part of the CBC's schedule for the 2007–2008 season. In April 2008 it was announced that the CBC had cancelled the show.

Celebrities profiled included Don Cherry, Chantal Kreviazuk, Shaun Majumder, Sonja Smits, Randy Bachman, Mary Walsh, Margot Kidder, Lewis MacKenzie, Steven Page, Avi Lewis, Margaret Trudeau, Scott Thompson and Measha Brueggergosman.

After a four-year absence, the show was rebroadcast during the 2012–13 season with guest host Jeff Douglas. However, only 7 of the original 13 episodes were rebroadcast: Cherry, Kreviazuk, Page, Bachman, Trudeau, Majumder, and Bruegergosman.

== Episodes ==
The list of twelve of the thirteen participants in season 1 was announced in late June 2007. Locations visited in the first season include India, Poland, Republic of Ireland, the Netherlands, Germany, Singapore, England and France, and the U.S. cities of Pittsburgh and New York City.

No. overall	No. in season	Title	Directed by	Original release date	Viewers (millions)
1	1	"Shaun Majumder"	Scott Harper	11 October 2007	N/A
With the help of a genealogist in St. John's Shaun is able to trace his ancestry back eight generations. Along the way Shaun learns that his family was a victim of the Partition of India in 1947 which split the British province into three countries - India, Pakistan, and Bangladesh.
2	2	"Margot Kidder"	Margaret Slaght	18 October 2007	N/A
3	3	"Steven Page"	David Langer	25 October 2007	N/A
Page's mother was ostracised by her Jewish family after she married Page's father who had converted to Judaism. Page explores one line of his mother's Jewish lineage and the struggles they faced living in downtown Toronto, and further back to their roots in Poland.
4	4	"Sonja Smits"	Karen Pinker	1 November 2007	N/A
5	5	"Chantal Kreviazuk"	Nadine Schwartz	8 November 2007	N/A
Chantal was born on a farm in Manitoba and had heard rumours about her ancestry. She was surprised to learn of the struggles her great-grandfather Nicolas went through after immigrating from Ukraine that ultimately led to his suicide. On her mother's side Chantal learned that a great-grandmother was listed as a "half-breed" on the 1870 census, what today is known as Métis. Chantal was able to trace her Cree ancestry back to the founding of the Hudson's Bay Company as her fore-bearers were fur traders.
6	6	"Major-General Lewis Mackenzie"	Richard Martyn	15 November 2007	N/A
Lewis was born in Liverpool but learned that his grandfather had moved to Gloucester in the early 20th century. While in Gloucester, Lewis looked into his great-uncle Lewis Quinton Wharton, who was the skipper of the Columbia when the great schooner ran aground on Sable Island in 1927. Lewis ultimately traced his ancestry back to Falls Church, Virginia, where his family members were Loyalists during the American Revolution. His family subsequently moved to Nova Scotia.
7	7	"Mary Walsh"	Matt Gallagher	22 November 2007	N/A
8	8	"Randy Bachman"	Margaret Slaght	29 November 2007	N/A
9	9	"Scott Thompson"	Scott Harper	6 December 2007	N/A
Scott was surprised to learn that his ancestry is almost exclusively Irish. He had hoped to find a connection to the British Royal Family. But, his ancestry consists of farmers, sailors, and maids. Scott jokes that he should start reading the works of Frank McCourt.
10	10	"Don Cherry"	Richard Martyn	10 January 2008	N/A
Don Cherry learns that his paternal grandfather was one of the original Royal Northwest Mounted Police dispatched by Sir John A. Macdonald to arrest American whiskey traders who were conducting business in the prairies. Don says that had he known that when growing up he would have named his son after his grandfather.
11	11	"Measha Brueggergosman"	Karen Pinker	17 January 2008	N/A
12	12	"Margaret Trudeau"	Peter Findlay	24 January 2008	N/A
13	13	"Avi Lewis"	Peter Findlay	31 January 2008	N/A

== Reception ==
In reviewing the first episode The Gazette says, "Who Do You Think You Are? is a stirring, thought-provoking look at what it means to be Canadian." The Ottawa Citizen noted that Thursday nights are the most competitive time of the week for broadcast networks and that many of the most-watched shows are on that night. They continue, "If you're looking for something a little out of the ordinary, though, give Who Do You Think You Are? a chance. You may be pleasantly surprised by what you find."

As part of announcing the show's return the CBC reported that the first season had an average audience through the first nine episodes of 708,000 viewers and that the audience skewed towards females and those with post-secondary education.
