= The Big Decision =

The Big Decision is a Canadian reality television / documentary series based on the British series Gerry's Big Decision. Broadcast on CBC Television, the series features struggling Canadian businesses which are seeking advice and funding to stay afloat.

Each episode follows the story of two struggling business owners who require an investment or business advice to remain in operation. Entrepreneurial experts, Arlene Dickinson or Jim Treliving provide a set of tasks to the business owners and ask them to follow through with implementing them. Either Arlene Dickinson or Jim Treliving follow-up to see how the business owners are attacking the challenges and how the management team operates. Through the tasks, business owners’ gain valuable knowledge about their market, how to successfully alter their business to turn it into a profitable venture, and keep it afloat. By the end of the episode, Arlene Dickinson or Jim Treliving make the final decision of whether to fund one, both, or neither business. This decision to become a partner through an investment can change the business forever.

The series debuted with a four-episode first season on March 12, 2012. A second season for the 2012–13 broadcast year was announced in May 2012.
