= Arlene Dickinson =

South African Canadian businesswoman (born 1956)

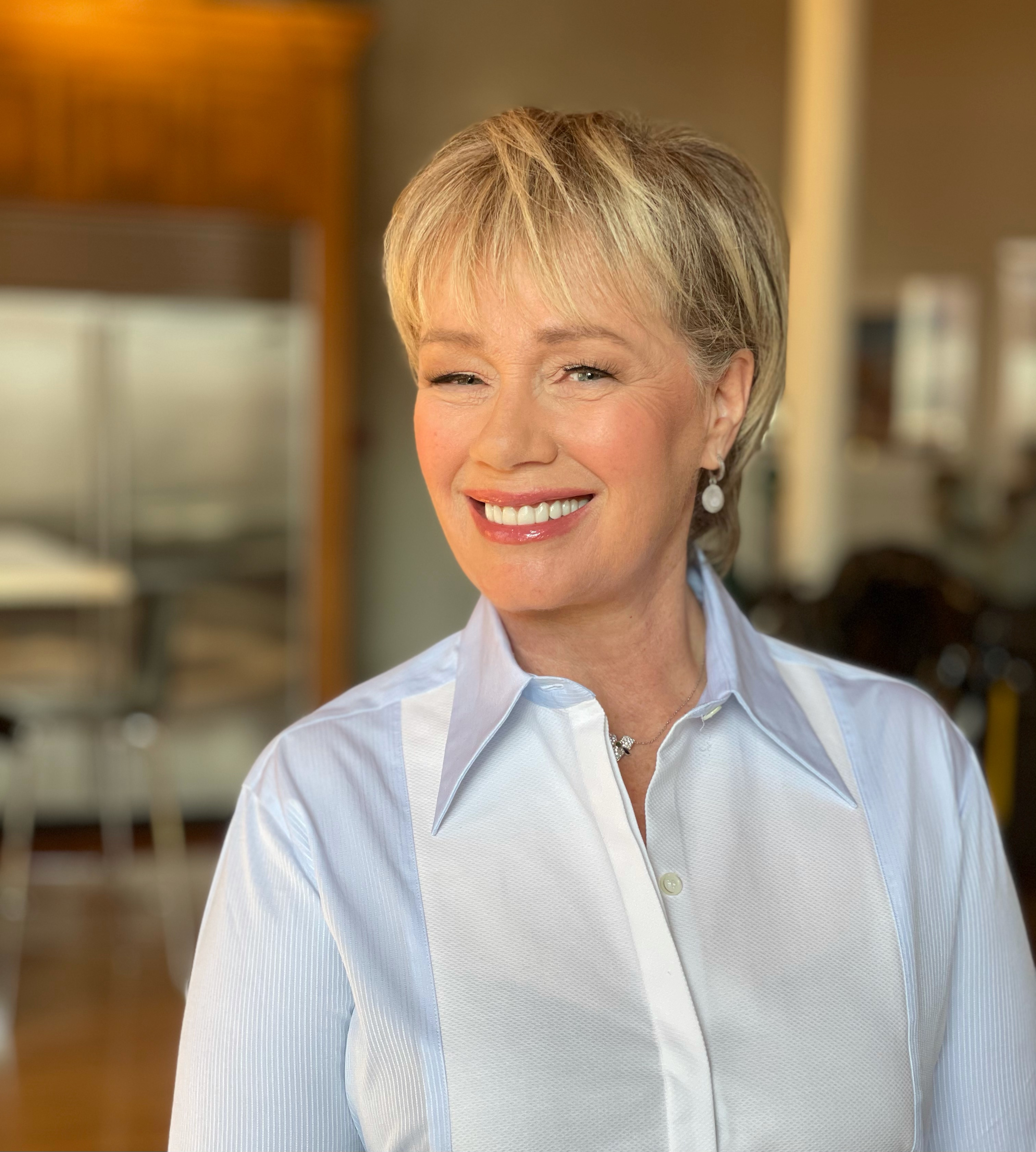
- Dickinson in 2021
- Born: 8 October 1956 (age 70); Germiston, Transvaal Union of South Africa
- Occupations: General Partner, District Ventures Capital
- Political party: Independent
- Website: arlenedickinson.com

Arlene Dickinson (born October 8, 1956) is a South African and Canadian businesswoman, investor, author, and television personality. She is the general partner of District Ventures Capital and CEO of Venturepark. Dickinson joined the cast of the CBC business reality show Dragons' Den during its second season in 2007 and departed in the ninth season in 2015. She then returned to continue with the Dragons for the 12th season in 2017. She was selected to perform on the series after she won numerous awards, including Calgary Business Owner of the Year, PROFIT magazine's Top 100 Women Business Owners, the Pinnacle Award for Entrepreneurial Excellence, Top 25 Canadian Immigrant Awards and Canada's Most Powerful Women Top 100. The show describes her as a self-made multi-millionaire.

== Personal life ==
Born in Germiston, Union of South Africa, and raised in Canada, Dickinson graduated from high school in Calgary, Alberta. She was raised in the Church of Jesus Christ of Latter Day Saints. She married at age 19 and had four children. She divorced at 31, which resulted in her ex-communication from the church due to her infidelity.

Politically, Dickinson identifies as non-partisan. When her former Dragons' Den co-star Kevin O'Leary entered the leadership race for the Conservative Party of Canada, she responded by saying that he "has this notion that greed is good." Afterwards, she criticized O'Leary for confusing the national debt with the deficit.

Dickinson endorsed Mark Carney in the 2025 Canadian federal election.

== Business ==
Dickinson joined Venture Communications in 1988, taking sole ownership in 1998. In October 2012, she launched Arlene Dickinson Enterprises (ADE) to fund and target Canada's entrepreneurs.

Over the years, Dickinson has served on boards including Ad Rodeo, Kids Help Phone, and the Calgary Municipal Lands Corporation. She sits on the advisory committee of the Stratford Institute at the University of Waterloo, the Leadership Council of the Perimeter Institute for Theoretical Physics as well as the editorial advisory board of Marketing Magazine. In October 2016, Dickinson was appointed to the board of directors of Aphria, a licensed medical marijuana producer.

== Books ==
In 2011, Dickinson published her first book, Persuasion, an autobiography. Her second book, All In, subtitled "You, Your Business, Your Life", was released in 2013.

In 2019, Dickinson published her third book, Reinvention: Changing Your Life, Your Career, Your Future.

== Media ==
Dickinson starred as a dragon investor on Dragons' Den, starting in 2007 for the second season. She also starred in her own spinoff, The Big Decision. In 2015, Dickinson announced that she was leaving Dragons' Den after the ninth season. She returned for season 12 in 2017.

In 2012, Dickinson guest starred as a past version of herself on the Canadian television period drama Murdoch Mysteries, in the episode called "Invention Convention", as a possible investor.

She appeared as a judge on Recipe to Riches in the 2014 season.

In 2017, Dickinson hosted Under New Management, a television special in which she guided aspiring new entrepreneurs in the process of purchasing a business.

In 2018, Dickinson and singer Jann Arden debuted as cohosts of The Business of Life, a lifestyle podcast on topics such as entrepreneurship, motherhood, writing, relationships and navigating life challenges. It aired for 46 episodes before ending its run on August 3, 2019.

== Awards ==
Dickinson has been inducted into Canada's Most Powerful Women Top 100 Hall of Fame. In 2014, Dickinson was one of the recipients of the Top 25 Canadian Immigrant Awards presented by Canadian Immigrant Magazine. Her company Venture Communications was noted as one of the 2001 winners on the list of Canada's Best Managed Companies sponsored by Deloitte, CIBC, National Post, Queen's School of Business and MacKay CEO Forums.

=== Commonwealth honours ===
Location	Date	Appointment	Post-nominal letters
Canada	2012	Queen Elizabeth II Diamond Jubilee Medal (Canadian Version)	

=== Honorary degrees ===
Location	Date	School	Degree	Gave Commencement Address
Nova Scotia	October 2, 2010	Mount Saint Vincent University	Doctor of Humane Letters (DHL)	Yes
Alberta	2010	Northern Alberta Institute of Technology		Yes
Quebec	June 7, 2016	Concordia University	Doctor of Laws (LL.D)	Yes
Alberta	June 3, 2017	Olds College	Bachelor of Applied Science - Agribusiness	Yes
Ontario	June 4, 2025	Ontario Tech University	Doctor of Laws (LL.D)	Yes

== Honorary military appointments ==
Military Branch	Date	Affiliation	Position
(Canada) Royal Canadian Navy	June 22, 2012 – Present	Office of the Director General Maritime Strategic Management	Honorary Captain

== Humanitarianism ==
Dickinson was the national spokesperson for Breakfast Clubs of Canada to help raise awareness of the importance of children having a nutritious start to the day. In 2013, she joined on as a champion of the Give a Day campaign, in support of Dignitas International and the Stephen Lewis Foundation.
