= Laura Calder =

Canadian chef

Laura Calder is a Canadian chef who hosted the television series French Food at Home.

== Early life and education ==
Calder was born in Saint John, New Brunswick, and raised in Long Reach on Kingston Peninsula, the southern part of New Brunswick. She left New Brunswick to attend Concordia University in Montreal, Quebec. She also attended York University in Toronto, and the London School of Economics in the U.K., after a stint as a sports reporter for a New Brunswick newspaper. Leaving London to return to Canada, Calder took a job in public relations, but left that position to enroll in the Dubrulle Culinary Institute, a cooking school in Vancouver. She then studied cooking at the École de Cuisine La Varenne in France.

== Career ==
Calder has written four cookbooks, including French Food at Home (2003), French Taste: Elegant, Everyday, Eating (2009), Dinner Chez Moi: The Fine Art of Feeding Friends (2011), and Paris Express: Simple Food from the City of Style (2014). French Taste was awarded the 2010 Taste Canada gold medal for cookbooks. She has also written The Inviting Life (2017) and Kitchen Bliss (2023). She is a judge on Recipe to Riches, a reality series on Food Network Canada, and has been a guest judge on both Top Chef Canada and Iron Chef America.

In 2011, the Canadian government announced that Calder had received the Order of Agricultural Merit from the French government, in the standing of knight.

== Filmography ==
Television
Year	Show	Role	Notes
2007–2010	French Food at Home	Host	
2007	The Chateau Dinner, French Food At Home Special	Herself	
2008	Twas the Night Before Dinner Christmas Special	Herself	Christmas special with Bob Blumer, Anthony Sedlak, Anna Olson, and Ricardo Larrivée
2011	Iron Chef America	Herself/Judge	Battle mussels, Battle caviar
2011	Top Chef Canada	Herself/Guest judge	Episode "The French Feast"; Judged the elimination challenge
2011	Recipe to Riches	Herself/Judge	

== Awards and nominations ==
- 2009: James Beard Foundation Award — Nominated for Best Television Food Show, National and Local
- 2010: Taste Canada — Winner of gold medal for Cookbook: French Taste: Elegant Everyday Eating
- 2010: James Beard Foundation Award — Winner of Best Television Show, In Studio or Fixed Location for French Food at Home
- 2011: Awarded Order of Agricultural Merit

== Bibliography ==
- French Food At Home, (ISBN 0060087714, 2003)
- French Taste: Elegant Everyday Eating, HarperCollins Publishers Ltd, (ISBN 1554681022, 2009)
- Dinner Chez Moi: the Fine Art of Feeding Friends, HarperCollins Publishers Ltd (ISBN 1554689023, 2011)
- Paris Express: Simple Food from the City of Style, HarperCollins Publishers Ltd. (ISBN 9781443420204, 2014)
- The Inviting Life: An Inspirational Guide to Homemaking, Hosting and Opening the Door to Happiness, Doubleday Canada (ISBN 9780147530523, 2017)
- Kitchen Bliss: Musings on Food and Happiness (With Recipes), Simon & Schuster Canada (ISBN 9781982194703, 2023)
