= The Quon Dynasty =

Canadian television program

- Genre: Reality television
- Starring: Kinman Quon; Amy Quon; Miles Quon; Mandy Quon; Marty Quon
- Original language: English
- No. of seasons: 1
- No. of episodes: 13

Production
- Production locations: Edmonton, Alberta, Canada
- Camera setup: Multi-camera

Original release
- Network: Citytv

The Quon Dynasty is a Canadian television program that premiered on October 16, 2011, on Citytv. Produced by Anaid Productions, it is a documentary following the Quon family, restaurateurs in Edmonton, Alberta. The family had also appeared on the earlier series The Family Restaurant, which profiled several different family-owned restaurants in the Edmonton area. In Asia, The Quon Dynasty is aired on bio. There is also a Cantonese edition of The Quon Dynasty, which is aired on OMNI, a sister network of Citytv.

The Quon Dynasty was nominated for Best Documentary Series and Best Production Reflecting Cultural Diversity in the Alberta Film and Television Awards.

== Synopsis ==
The Quons are a Chinese family that live in Edmonton, Alberta. They all run their restaurant, the Lingnan, owned by Kinman Quon. His wife, Amy Quon, owns the fast-food restaurant Chicken For Lunch in Downtown. The Lingnan features many traditional Chinese foods and drinks, and usually gets large numbers of customers. Miles, wants the restaurant to be modern, not old-fashioned. He is loyal to his family and is "the number one son", and he takes that role very seriously. Kinman does not like change, he likes the Lingnan the way it is, because it has been doing fine for sixty years. Mandy, Amy and Kinman's daughter, lives with her parents and currently works nights at the restaurant. She is dating a man named Ajit, who also works at the Lingnan. She dreams of a life of glamour and fame, and is not completely devoted to the restaurant. Marty, who also lives with Amy and Kinman, is the "slacker", and does not want to work for his desired riches. Amy, their mother, loves her children and takes control of all aspects of their life as much as she can.

== Cast ==
- Miles Quon: eldest son of Kitman and Amy Quon, manager of Lingnan restaurant
- Amy Quon: over-protective mother of Miles, Mandy, and Marty; wife of Kinman
- Kinman Quon: owner of the Lingnan restaurant, the backbone and stabilizing member of the family
- Mandy Quon: middle child and only daughter of Amy and Kinman, her hobby is skydiving
- Marty Quon: youngest child of Amy and Kinman, his dream is to have an ice cream truck
- Ajit: Mandy's boyfriend and restaurant employee

== Nominations and awards ==
The Quon Dynasty was nominated for Best Documentary Series and Best Production Reflecting Cultural Diversity in the Alberta Film and Television Awards.

== Episodes ==
No.	Title	Original release date
1	"Chop Suey on the Prairie"	October 16, 2011
A museum curator offers to showcase the Lingnan at the opening of a travelling exhibit. It’s only for a few hours. What could go wrong?
2	"Wok on the Wild Side"	October 23, 2011
Mandy decides to fulfill a lifelong dream, skydiving, sending her worry-wart mother into a rapidly spiraling meltdown. Meanwhile, Miles finally takes a break from his workaholic life to hit the town with some new buddies: rockabilly dudes he met (where else?) at the Lingnan. Now Amy’s fretting about him, too. Is her only daughter about to leap to her certain death? And will Miles come home with a tattoo?
3	"Spring Rolls-Royce"	October 30, 2011
Larry, Moe and Curly (aka Miles, Marty and Ajit) decide to purchase and refit a rusty, clunky catering truck. Their half-baked objective: to make some easy money by taking the Lingnan brand to the downtown streets. Mandy, miffed at being left on the sidelines of this boys-only misadventure, launches a moneymaking scheme of her own.
4	"Wonton O' Fun"	November 6, 2011
Mandy feels that the family needs some bonding time away from the restaurant. Mandy insists the family gets away from the restaurant (and the bickering) and sells them on the romantic idea of a camping getaway, even though they have never attempted anything more rustic than a patio barbecue. They stuff themselves into a rented van and head to the mountains—for an outdoors adventure they’ll never forget (no matter how hard they may try).
5	"Sweet and Sour Surprise"	November 12, 2011
Amy is appalled when Marty throws a lavish birthday party for his wiener dog Tai Chi. What kind of son throws a party for a stupid dog, but never even acknowledges his own mother’s birthday (which happens to be approaching)? The chastened kids decide to surprise their mom with a massive surprise birthday bash. True to form, though, they turn this sweet idea into a no-holds-barred sibling competition for their mom’s affection.
6	"Soya Think You Can Sing?"	November 20, 2011
Marty decides to follow his dreams and write a song. Miles takes Kinman to pick out a better house wine.
7	"The Choy Of Cooking"	November 27, 2011
Amy is both flattered and terrified when she receives a surprise request to teach a cooking class. Can she rope Miles into serving as her sidekick (and safety net)? At the restaurant, the kids convince a reluctant Kinman to try out an art course (which would also get him out from underfoot). His first class, featuring an attractive female live model, helps Kinman rediscover his passion for sketching!
8	"Moo Shoo The Merch"	December 4, 2011
Amy loves to buy shiny baubles to hand out as gifts, but her accumulated "treasures" look more like a hoarder's stockpile. The kids decide to stage an intervention. If you're having a hard time finding that perfect shiny bauble to bring you good fortune for years to come, that's probably because Amy has already bought them all. Meanwhile, Marty reveals his latest money-making scheme – Lingnan branded merchandise. Anybody wanna buy a Lingnan backscratcher?
9	"iRun Chefs"	December 11, 2011
Bossy mom Amy launches Miles and Marty on a weight-loss competition, in an effort to tame her sons' ever-increasing waistlines. Business is booming for the overworked crew at the Lingnan—and so, unfortunately, are Miles' and Marty's waistlines. Their bossy mom Amy launches them on a weight-loss program. Miles, worried about the Lingnan's ongoing staffing crunch, puts Kinman in charge of hiring more help—with Mandy riding shotgun. They end up with a dubious assortment of applicants boasting such skills as “able to peel hard-boiled eggs.
10	"That's The Way The Fortune Cookie Crumbles"	December 18, 2011
Amy asks her fortune-teller/hairdresser if she is doomed to be lonely in her old age. Wait until she finds out that Mandy has decided it’s time to get her own place. During a fortune-telling session with clairvoyant/hairdresser Ricky, Amy plaintively asks if she will be lonely in her old age. Little does she realize—daughter Mandy, who still lives with her mom, has decided to go condo shopping. Meanwhile, Ricky also gets Amy worrying about Kinman's health. Determined to get him active, she convinces him to take up the sport of his youth—bowling—and his ultra-competitive sons come along for the ride.
11	"Chow Fun Down Under"	January 8, 2012
The Lingnan boys cater "Australia Day" at a mountain ski resort—giving them a thinly disguised excuse to hit the road and cut loose. And cut loose they do, amid mobs of unruly Aussies competing in eating contests and “human curling.” At home, a small local magazine asks Amy for a recipe—plus a photo spread. Amy, predictably, goes into supermodel mode.
12	"Chow Mein Event"	January 15, 2012
After participating in a charity run (in a gorilla suit!), Mandy decides to create a fundraising gala of her own, hosted by the Lingnan. The boys suspect their princess sister is just doing it for the attention. But, when Mandy takes firm control of the project (much to Miles’ surprise), the whole family belatedly jumps on the bandwagon. Amy, for instance, is particularly intrigued to hear that Mandy’s plans include a fashion show…
13	"The Kung Pao-r of Love"	January 22, 2012
It's “singles night” at the Lingnan, but matchmaker Amy is fretting about her own romantic worries: her son Marty is "living in sin", and her husband Kinman takes her for granted. Will Marty melt his mom's disapproval, by following through on a plan to propose to Arisa? And can Mandy arm-twist her unromantic dad into making just one grand gesture? Meanwhile, Miles flirts with a potential rival for his love of the Lingnan—his own Asian tapas bar.

== See also ==
- Lists of Canadian television series
