= 16×9 =

Canadian investigative newsmagazine television program

- Created by: Troy Reeb, Mary Garofalo
- Presented by: Carolyn Jarvis
- Country of origin: Canada
- No. of seasons: 8

Production
- Running time: 60 minutes

Original release
- Network: Global
- Release: November 30, 2008 – June 28, 2016

16×9 (formerly branded as 16:9 and 16:9: The Bigger Picture) is a Canadian investigative newsmagazine television program created by Troy Reeb and Mary Garofalo that aired on Global for eight seasons. The series debuted on November 30, 2008, with Mary Garofalo as host and Senior Consulting Producer until October 2011. Carolyn Jarvis later took over hosting until its cancellation on June 28, 2016.

The title refers to the aspect ratio of 16:9 high definition television broadcasts which display a wider area, hence, a bigger picture, as opposed to 4:3 standard definition.

Originally airing as a half-hour series, 16x9 expanded to an hour-long program for the 2011–12 television season.

Allison Vuchnich won a 2009 Gemini Award for Best News Information Series. Mary Garofalo earned a Gemini in 2011 for Best Lifestyle/Practical Information Series. On March 8, 2016, the program won for Best News or Information Series at the 4th Canadian Screen Awards.

16x9 was canceled by Global on June 28, 2016, due to job cuts, network programming changes and low ratings.

== See also ==
- List of 16×9 episodes
