= Recipe to Riches =

- Starring: Jesse Palmer; Tony Chapman; Laura Calder; Dana McCauley; Carlo Rota; Vikram Vij; Arlene Dickinson; Gail Simmons
- Country of origin: Canada
- No. of episodes: 16

Production
- Executive producers: David Fortier, Ivan Schneeberg, Gerry McKean and Blair Harley
- Running time: 60 minutes
- Production company: Temple Street Productions

Original release
- Network: Food Network Canada; Global; CBC
- Release: October 19, 2011 – 2014

Recipe to Riches is a Canadian television reality show, in which home cooks from around the country competed to have their recipe become a President's Choice product. Competitors bring their home cooked meal to one of the cross-Canada open casting calls where a panel of judges critique their food based on taste, mass appeal, and marketing potential. The series concept was developed by Allan Novak together with Theresa-Kowall-Shipp.

In its first two seasons, the show aired on Food Network Canada and Global. It was then picked up by CBC Television for its third season in 2013.

The show's host in its first two seasons was former Bachelor Jesse Palmer. Actor Carlo Rota has been announced as the third season host. Judges have included marketing guru Tony Chapman, product development expert Dana McCauley and cookbook author Laura Calder.

== Format ==
Competitors from across the country bring their home cooked meals to one of the nationwide open casting calls. The open casting call is fashioned around that of American Idol, where the home cook presents their dish in front of a panel of judges. If the judges like the recipe they are given a gold card that tells them they are up for consideration to become a finalist on the show.

After narrowing down the competitors from across the country, three are flown to Toronto to compete on the show.

== International versions ==
In 2012 it was announced that FremantleMedia had picked up the rights to the format and will market it to various international broadcast partners for franchised local versions. To date, international versions have commenced production in Slovakia, Australia and the Czech Republic. A German adaption named "Das Erfolgsrezept" ("The Success Recipe") will air in early 2015.
