= List of programs broadcast by HGTV (Canada) =

This is a list of programs currently, formerly, and soon to be broadcast by Home Network and HGTV Canada's former and current incarnations. It includes both original programming created for the network, and programming acquired from other sources including HGTV US.

Note: An asterisk indicates that a show will be briefly retained by Home Network, before moving to the new HGTV channel.

== A ==
- The Antonio Treatment

== B ==
- Backyard Builds
- Bang for Your Buck
- The Block
- Build a New Life in the Country
- Bryan Inc.
- Bryan's All In
- Building Baeulmer
- Buy Herself
- Buy Me
- Buyers Bootcamp

== C ==
- Canada's Handyman Challenge
- Colin and Justin's Home Heist
- The County
- Cowboy Builders

== D ==
- Debbie Travis' Facelift
- Deck Wars
- Decked Out
- The Decorating Adventures of Ambrose Price
- Design Inc.
- Design Interns
- Design Rivals
- Designer Guys
- Designer Superstar Challenge
- Disaster DIY
- Don't Hate Your House With the Property Brothers
- Dream Home

== E ==
- Empty Nest Refresh*
- The Expandables
- Extreme Makeover: Home Edition

== F ==
- Family Home Overhaul
- Farmhouse Facelift
- The Fix
- Fixer Upper
- Flipping Out
- For Rent
- Four Houses

== G ==
- Gasp!
- Gut Job

== H ==
- Handyman Superstar Challenge
- HGTV's Top 10
- Hidden Potential
- Hoarder House Flippers
- Honest Renovations*
- Holmes and Holmes
- Holmes Inspection
- Holmes on Homes
- Home by Novogratz
- Home to...
- Home to Win
- Hotline*
- House Hunters
- House Hunters International
- House of Ali
- House of Bryan
- How Not to Decorate

== I ==
- I Wrecked My House
- Income Property
- Income Property on Vacation
- Island of Bryan

== J ==
- Junk Brothers
- Just Ask Jon Eakes

== K ==
- Kitchen Cousins
- Kitchen Equipped

== L ==
- Leave It to Bryan
- Life is Messy
- Location, Location, Location
- Love It or List It
- Love It or List It Vancouver

== M ==
- Making it Home with Kortney and Kenny
- Massive Moves
- Masters of Flip
- May the Best House Win
- Million Dollar Contractor
- Mission: Organization
- Moving the McGillivrays
- My First Place

== N ==
- Neat

== O ==
- Open House Overhaul

== P ==
- Paint School
- Pamela's Garden of Eden
- Plant Mama
- Property Brothers
- Property Brothers: Buying and Selling
- Property Brothers: Forever Home
- Property Ladder
- Property Shop
- Property Virgins
- Pure Design

== R ==
- Real Estate Intervention
- Real Renos
- Renovation Resort
- Rentovation
- Relocation, Relocation
- Restaurant Makeover
- Rock Solid Builds
- Room Service
- Rooms That Rock
- Rust Valley Restorers

== S ==
- Scott's Own Vacation House
- Scott's Vacation House Rules
- Sarah's House
- Sarah's Mountain Escape
- Sarah Off the Grid
- Save My Reno
- Selling Houses Australia
- Selling LA
- Selling New York
- Small Town Escapes
- The Stagers
- Styled
- Summer Home

== T ==
- Tackle My Reno
- Timber Kings
- Top Design
- Tough As Nails
- Turf War

== U ==
- The Unsellables
- Unusually Thicke
- Urban Suburban

== V ==
- VELUX

== W ==
- Weekend Warriors
- World's Greenest Homes
- Worst to First

== Y ==
- Yard Crashers
