= Canada's Handyman Challenge =

- Genre: Reality competition
- Presented by: Jillian Harris (Season 1); Jenn Robertson (Season 2)
- Judges: Mike Holmes; Bryan Baeumler; Scott McGillivray; Paul Lafrance
- Country of origin: Canada
- Original language: English
- No. of seasons: 3

Production
- Running time: 45 minutes

Original release
- Network: HGTV Canada
- Release: January 10, 2012 – January 21, 2014

Canada's Handyman Challenge is a Canadian reality game show. The series premiered on January 10, 2012, on HGTV Canada. Canada's Handyman Challenge is the successor to HGTV's previous series, Handyman Superstar Challenge, similar in format to the All American Handyman sister show.

== Format ==
Canada's Handyman Challenge pits competitors against each other in a series of challenges meant to test their speed, expertise and precision. Contestants must complete tasks such as tiling a section of flooring, repairing a roof, or identifying a tool. Judges also evaluate their knowledge in question segments to test their knowledge of building codes, materials, and common measurements.

The show auditions competitors from across Canada before a final group of contestants compete in a series of handyman challenges for the title of Canada's Best Handyman and $25,000. Auditions held in Vancouver, Halifax, and Toronto included a challenge to create an item of the competitor's choice from single piece of plywood. Entrants made items ranging from a pinball machine to an old-fashioned bicycle.

Contestants range from artists to local handymen and part of the show's appeal is the range of talents the competitors bring to the challenges.

== Personalities ==
Judges for the show are personalities from other HGTV home improvement shows. Season 1 judges included Mike Holmes, of Holmes on Homes and Holmes Inspection, Scott McGillivray of Income Property and Bryan Baeumler of House of Bryan. McGillivray and Baeumler returned as judges for the second season with the addition of Paul Lafrance of Decked Out. Holmes was a special guest judge for the finale episode of season 2.

Hosts for the show have been Jillian Harris (Season 1) and Jenn Robertson (Season 2).

== Seasons ==
	Debut	Episodes	Winner	Host	Judges	Notes
Season 1	Tuesday January 10, 2012		Mark Falvai; Qualicum Beach, British Columbia	Jillian Harris	Mike Holmes; Scott McGillivray; Bryan Baeumler	
Season 2	Tuesday January 22, 2013		Maria Nestoras; Hamilton, Ontario	Jennifer Robertson	Scott McGillivray; Bryan Baeumler; Paul Lafrance	
Season 3	Tuesday January 21, 2014	10	Brent Balluff; Coquitlam, BC	Jennifer Robertson	Scott McGillivray; Bryan Baeumler; Paul Lafrance	

== See also ==
- Blood, Sweat & Tools
