= Deck Wars =

Television series

Deck Wars is a 2011 Canadian television series, airing on HGTV. It is considered a sister series to Decked Out, and like Decked Out, stars Paul Lafrance and his deck building crew. Unlike its sister series, Deck Wars is a game show that pits two teams of contestants against each other in building a deck in two days with a common theme.

== Format ==
Deck Wars features two teams, each consisting of two contestants, competing to design and build a deck within two days. Both teams are given the same materials and an identical building facades set of tools, as well as the use of two of Paul's crew members; contestants may also bring in whatever materials that they deem necessary for their deck design. On the second day, two sets of furniture will be provided for decorating each deck; the team finishing first, as determined by Paul, will have their choice of furniture. Both decks will be judged by Paul Lafrance and a rotating panel of two judges; the Decked Out crew members will are also interviewed on the experience working with the contestants. The victorious team receives the Deck Wars trophy, and the defeated team receives participation ribbons as a consolation prize.

Like its sister series, Deck Wars involves comedic banter between the contestants, their helpers, and Paul himself; this often manifests itself in trash-talking, as well as the "moment of suspense" before the winner is announced.

== Judges ==
The judges of Deck Wars in each episode are all fellow HGTV program hosts. The judges are two members chosen from the following:

- Bryan Baeumler - host of Disaster DIY and House of Bryan of HGTV. Also a judge on Canada's Handyman Superstar.
- Damon Bennett - crew supervisor of Holmes on Homes and Holmes Inspection, and co-host of the latter series.
- Jim Caruk - host of Builder Boss on HGTV. Also hosts Real Renos, and a judge on Handyman Superstar Challenge.
- Scott McGillivray - host of Income Property on HGTV. Also a judge on Canada's Handyman Superstar and All American Handyman.
