= Paul Lafrance =

Builder, contractor, television home-renovation host

- Born: January 17, 1974 (age 51)
- Occupations: Deck Builder; Builder/Contractor; Television Host; Musician

Paul Lafrance is a Canadian television personality on HGTV Canada. Born in Wimbledon, England, he is based in Pickering.

Lafrance has been a host on shows including Decked Out, Deck Wars, and is a celebrity judge on the second season of Canada's Handyman Challenge. He is also the host of Disaster Deck, a new series that is still in beginning phases of preparation and casting.

== Biography ==
Cutting Edge and Design, a building contractor owned by Lafrance is in Pickering. He also owns and operates Paul Lafrance Design, which specializes in high-end custom deck designs and has operations through North America.

He was offered his own television show after doing a segment on Breakfast Television. The show, Decked Out follows Lafrance and his decking company to different jobs, typically involving the construction of mini-oases.

While filming Decked Out, Lafrance served as a celebrity judge on Deck Wars

Lafrance is also a musician and was active in the Christian music scene in Ontario. He was a musician before he was a carpenter. His band, Found in the Fury, released their debut album, entitledSongs from the Cave in 2012.

His work has been featured on Holmes on Homes, Breakfast Television, and Holmes Inspection.

Lafrance has also opened an art gallery in Pickering.

== Filmography ==
- Decked Out
- Deck Wars — host
- Canada's Handyman Challenge — judge
- House of Bryan — guest star, deck builder
- Disaster Decks
- Home to Win — guest builder
- Custom Built
- Holmes Inspection (S1E8)

== See also ==
- Mike Holmes
- Bryan Baeumler
- Scott McGillivray
