= Family Home Overhaul =

Canadian television series

Family Home Overhaul is a Canadian home renovation reality series, which premiered September 27, 2020 on HGTV Canada. Described by some critics as a Canadian version of Extreme Makeover: Home Edition, the series features various HGTV designers working with deserving families who have been nominated by their communities to renovate their homes.

The series is hosted by Cheryl Hickey, with participating designers Scott McGillivray, Tiffany Pratt, Sebastian Clovis, Kortney Wilson, Dave Wilson, Brian McCourt, Mia Parres, Kate Campbell, Dave Coleman, Sarah Keenleyside, Joey Fletcher, Dave Kenney, Samantha Pynn and Tommy Smythe.

The show was originally slated to premiere in April 2020, but was delayed to September because of the COVID-19 pandemic in Canada. Hickey characterized the show's rescheduled premiere date as "exactly the right time", highlighting the show's celebration of community as a necessary and valuable message in 2020.
