= Sarah Daniels =

Sarah Daniels may refer to:

- Sarah Daniels (playwright)
- Sarah Daniels (actress)
- Sarah Daniels, host of the Canadian reality television series Urban Suburban
