= Mike Holmes =

Canadian contractor, television host, and investor (born 1963)

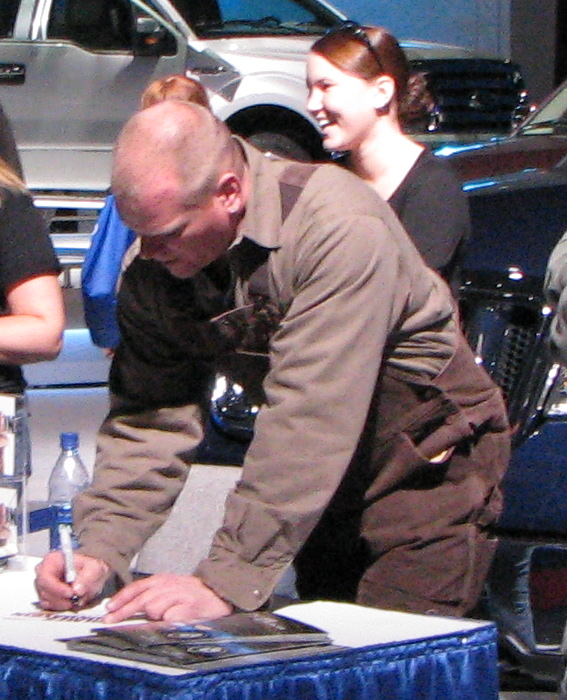
- Mike Holmes signing autographs
- Born: August 3, 1963 (age 63); Halton Hills, Ontario, Canada
- Occupations: Builder/contractor; Businessman; Investor; Television host; Philanthropist
- Children: 3

Michael James Holmes (born August 3, 1963) is a Canadian general contractor, businessman, investor, television host, and philanthropist.

== Background ==
Mike Holmes began learning construction from his father starting when he was six years old. By the time he was 19, Holmes had started his first contracting company with a crew of 13 employees. At 21, Holmes founded his own renovation company. He has run two companies during his 20-year contracting career. He has three children: Amanda, Sherry, and Mike Jr., who have all appeared and worked on his shows.

In 2006, Holmes started The Holmes Foundation after seeing a renovation that was so poorly done that he felt it was necessary for him to tear the house down and start again rather than try to repair the damage. The purpose of The Holmes Foundation is to encourage young people to enter the building trades as well as to assist those who have been impoverished by bad renovations. Holmes works with SOS Children's Villages.

In 2006, Mike Holmes was recognized in the House of Commons of Canada for his promotion of skilled trades and for his advocacy for improved building standards. He was acknowledged as an "extraordinary craftsperson" and "an accomplished master builder with a social conscience".

Holmes is the author of two books: Home Renovation with Canada's Most Trusted Contractor, Holmes Inspection: Everything You Need to Know Before You Buy or Sell Your Home, as well as a weekly newspaper column.

In May 2010, Reader's Digest's second annual survey named Holmes as the second most widely trusted person in Canada behind David Suzuki.

== Television career ==
=== HGTV Canada ===
Mike Holmes' first starring series was Holmes on Homes, which premiered in 2003, on Corus Entertainment's HGTV Canada.

=== Bell Media ===
In June 2019, Bell Media announced a new development deal with Holmes, ending his relationship with HGTV Canada. His library of programming moved airing to Gusto, which was rebranded as CTV Life Channel, and two new series were announced, including Holmes 911, and the Holmes Family Rescue for CTV in 2020.

== Television series ==
=== Holmes on Homes ===
Broadcast on HGTV Canada, Holmes on Homes first started in 2001. Holmes on Homes was first conceived when Holmes approached the producers of the Just Ask Jon Eakes home improvement show on HGTV with the idea for a new kind of home improvement show. Although there were few submissions to the show initially, their number ballooned by the fourth season. As the show evolved, it generally focused on bad renovations and the results of bad contractors.

In Canada, Holmes on Homes airs on HGTV Canada, BBC Canada, and Casa for the French version. It airs in the US on HGTV and DIY Network, in New Zealand on The Living Channel, in Australia on Lifestyle Home, in the United Kingdom on Discovery Shed (formerly Discovery Real Time), in Germany on DMAX, and in South Africa on the Home Channel.

=== Holmes in New Orleans ===
Between the end of Holmes on Homes and the start of Holmes Inspection, Mike Holmes starred in a one-season series, Holmes in New Orleans, on the construction of a new home in the Lower Ninth Ward of New Orleans, to replace one destroyed during Hurricane Katrina.

=== Holmes Inspection ===
Holmes began a new series in 2009 called Holmes Inspection that profiles home inspections gone wrong. The series started airing in the fall of 2009 on HGTV Canada. In the United States, the series debuted on HGTV on Sunday, December 19, 2010. Holmes inspected the houses while checking up on the construction, leaving long-time crew member Damon Bennett as the lead site manager and backup host.

=== Best of Holmes on Homes ===
Best of Holmes on Homes is a 2012 remix TV series featuring clips from Holmes on Homes, brought together on a common theme, to illustrate home problems. Holmes narrates the show.

=== Holmes Makes It Right ===
Holmes started a new series for 2012 called Holmes Makes It Right, where he profiles and renovates disaster-stricken. The series focuses on natural disasters and bad home inspections or bad contractor work. The name of the series revolves around Holmes's personal motto, "Make It Right". While Holmes visited the construction sites, he had long-time crew member Damon Bennett in charge and mostly hosting.

=== Mike's Ultimate Garage ===
For the fall 2014 TV season, Mike's Ultimate Garage, a mini-series about building a man-cave garage for Holmes Sr. (Big Mike) by son Mike Holmes Jr. and daughter Sherry Holmes aired on HGTV Canada. Holmes Sr. guest stars in the series, while it starred Mike Jr. as the construction lead and Sherry.

=== Holmes and Holmes ===
For the fall 2016 TV season, Holmes and Holmes premiered. In this series, Holmes stars with his son Mike Jr. The show premiered on HGTV Canada, produced by Make It Right Productions. Now in its third season, Holmes and Holmes aired on the DIY Network (USA) in October 2019.

=== Holmes: Buy It Right ===
For the fall 2016 TV season, Holmes: Buy It Right premiered. In this series Holmes stars as an advisor to new home buyers, showing them how to choose a house. The series premiered on DIY Network (USA).

=== Holmes: Next Generation ===
Holmes: Next Generation premiered in April 2018 on DIY Network (USA). Mike Holmes assists two of his children, Mike Holmes Jr. and Sherry Holmes, as they take on remodelling projects.

=== Holmes Makes It Right: Retooled ===
Retooled premiered during the spring 2019 TV season on DIY Network (USA), where Holmes revisits Holmes Makes It Right (2012) episodes that have been "retooled", and examines construction issues.

=== Holmes 911 ===
HOLMES 911 premiered on September 17, 2019 on CTV Life, in which Holmes returns and examines the results of unscrupulous contractors, unhealthy homes, and DIY projects gone wrong and is joined by his son Mike Jr. and daughter Sherry. Over 12 one-hour episodes, the Holmes family takes on five different houses, and repairs them.

=== Holmes Family Effect ===
Holmes Family Effect premiered in Canada on February 7, 2021, right after Super Bowl LV. The series debuted a month later in the United States on March 16 on FOX. It features Mike Holmes, his daughter Sherry and his son Mike Jr. helping homeowners, schools and businesses in need of improvement. They work to overhaul not only houses, but commercial and public buildings.

=== Holmes Family Rescue ===
Holmes Family Rescue premiered in Canada and the US on December 4, 2021 on HGTV and later on CTV Life. It features Mike Holmes, his daughter Sherry and his son Mike Jr. helping homeowners who have had improperly done construction work on their homes.

== TV judging and hosting ==
=== Handyman Challenge franchise ===
Holmes was a judge on all seasons of Handyman Superstar Challenge. He was also a judge on All American Handyman. He was a judge on season 1 of Canada's Handyman Challenge.

=== Home Free ===
In late April 2015, Fox announced a new eight-episode Holmes-hosted show entitled Home Free, which premiered on July 22. The show featured nine couples who spend each week renovating a different dilapidated home. At the end of the week, the couple with the worst handiwork is eliminated, until the final two teams compete for a prize home. Unknown to the contestants as they were competing, each eliminated couple was awarded the home that they were working on in the episode they were eliminated in.

Eight-episode unscripted competition series Home Free premiered July 22, 2015 on Fox. "A home is way more than brick and mortar," says Home Free host Mike Holmes. "So being part of this new series and partnering with Fox is truly exciting for me. I'm ready to break ground with these couples." (Extreme Makeover: Home Edition).

== Guest appearances ==
Holmes was a guest builder on Home to Win. Guest builders designed and built a room of a renovated home that would be won by a Canadian family selected by the show's producers from submitted entries.

Holmes has been a guest on The Ellen DeGeneres Show twice during a season 4 episode in December 2006. The first instance led to a two-part episode on Holmes on Homes. He helped the Tiu family who bought a new house, a bungalow, in the Los Angeles area which he had to fix a shoddy renovation left by a clueless contractor. The second guest spot was to show Ellen the completed construction of the Tiu's newly renovation house, which Holmes, his crew and local contractors worked together to finish the project.

Holmes also made a guest appearance on an episode of the Canadian series Corner Gas as Wanda's ex-boyfriend (S4E06 2006/10/23).

In October 2019, Holmes made an appearance on HGTV's renovation competition series Rock the Block when he was a guest judge for one of the projects. For the series' second season in March 2021, Holmes was one of the contestants. He teamed up with designer Alison Victoria of Windy City Rehab whom he judged in season one. She says, "I'm a designer and [Mike's] a genius in the build. It's a partnership like no other."

In July 2021, Holmes was a guest judge alongside Mina Starsiak of Good Bones on the HGTV renovation competition series Battle on the Beach, where contestants team up with a star designer to battle it out renovating their outdated beach houses in Gulf Shores, Alabama.

== Business activities ==
=== The Holmes Group ===
The Holmes Group is the conglomerate and holding company for Mike Holmes' companies.

=== Mike Holmes Protection ===
In 2021 Holmes launched Mike Holmes Protection. This company offers home services contracts.

=== Holmes Approved Homes ===
Holmes has partnered with several home builders and renovators in Canada and the United States to develop the Holmes Approved Homes program. The goal of the program is to raise the bar for home building above minimum industry standards. A lawsuit was filed in December 2021 by Tarion, a consumer protection organization established by the Ontario government to help ensure new homes' defects under warranty are repaired, due to several homes built with partner companies having had numerous defects in Meaford, Ontario. Subsequently, three of the homes were demolished due to the nature of the defects discovered.

=== Other activities ===
Several magazines with Mike Holmes' brand and image have appeared on newsstands. Holmes: The Magazine to Make It Right ran for two years, and ended after a dispute between the publisher Dauphin Media Group and the Holmes Group. It had run from 2009 to 2011. Make it Right magazine, a collaboration between publisher TC Media and the Holmes Group was published in 2013. Holmes is an advisor for Ottawa Land Bank, a land banking service for speculators, managed by Oakwood and John Liptack.

In 2025, Holmes removed all webpages, ads, and videos in which he endorsed AGM Renovations after AGM came under investigation by the Electrical Safety Authority in Ontario.

== Awards and accolades ==
- 2004 Gemini Awards: Viewers' Choice Award
- February 21, 2008 Holmes was awarded an Honorary Doctorate of Technology from the British Columbia Institute of Technology (BCIT).
- 2009 Gemini Awards: Holmes in New Orleans: Best Lifestyle/Practical Information Series
- June 18, 2012: The Queen Elizabeth II Diamond Jubilee Medal
- December 2013: Holmes was appointed as a Patron of The Royal Canadian Regiment.

== Publications ==
- Holmes, Mike (2014). The Holmes Manual. HarperCollins Canada. ISBN 9781443422376.
- Holmes, Mike (2010). Make It Right: Kitchens and Bathrooms. HarperCollins Canada. ISBN 978-1-55468-033-7.
- Holmes, Mike (2009). Make It Right: Attics and Basements. HarperCollins Canada. ISBN 978-1-55468-031-3.
- Holmes, Mike (2008). The Holmes Inspection: Everything You Need to Know Before You Buy Or Sell Your Home. HarperCollins Canada. ISBN 978-1-55468-043-6.
- Holmes, Mike (2006). Make it Right: Inside Home Renovation with Canada's Most Trusted Contractor. HarperCollins Canada. ISBN 0-00-200813-0.

== See also ==
- Scott McGillivray
- Bryan Baeumler
- Paul LaFrance
