= Backyard Builds =

Canadian reality television series

Backyard Builds is a Canadian home renovation reality series, which premiered in 2017 on HGTV (Corus). Hosted by designer Sarah Keenleyside and contractor Brian McCourt, the series features the duo redesigning and renovating homeowners' back yards into more flexible and versatile outdoor living spaces.

The series received a Canadian Screen Award nomination for Best Lifestyle Program or Series at the 6th Canadian Screen Awards in 2018.

Production of the series went into hiatus due to the COVID-19 pandemic in Canada, with its final episodes airing in 2021. McCourt subsequently launched a home decor line for Harry Rosen and continued with his own design and construction firm, Brian McCourt Designs, while Keenleyside moved to Prince Edward County in 2024 with her husband, singer-songwriter Justin Rutledge, and returned to television in 2026 in the new HGTV (Rogers) show The County.
