= Samantha Pynn =

Canadian interior designer

Samantha Pynn is a Canadian interior designer, best known as a host of programming for HGTV Canada.

She was a regular contributor on home design to the daytime talk show CityLine in the 2000s, before debuting on HGTV as the host of Pure Design in 2008. She subsequently hosted Summer Home and Open House Overhaul, and was featured as one of the participating designers in the "all-star" HGTV shows Home to Win and Family Home Overhaul, before replacing Sabrina Smelko as the cohost of Save My Reno with Sebastian Clovis in 2020.

In 2015, she launched her own home decor collection with the La Maison Simons department store.

Pynn and Clovis received a Canadian Screen Award nomination for Best Host in a Lifestyle Series at the 10th Canadian Screen Awards in 2022.
