= Home to Win =

Television series

- Genre: reality home renovation
- Presented by: Sangita Patel
- Country of origin: Canada
- No. of seasons: 4
- No. of episodes: 34

Production
- Production company: Architect Films

Original release
- Network: HGTV Canada
- Release: April 24, 2016 – December 15, 2019

Home to Win is a Canadian home renovation reality television series, which premiered April 24, 2016 on HGTV Canada. The series features contractors and designers from all of the network's original productions collaborating on the renovation and design of a single "dream house", which will be awarded to a registered viewer at the end of the series. The series is also dubbed into the French language, and aired on the Canadian channel CASA as Maison à Gagner.

== History ==
Season 1 features 20 of the network's personalities. It was hosted by Sangita Patel, the participating designers and contractors are Bryan Baeumler, Sarah Baeumler, Mike Holmes, Mike Holmes Jr., Scott McGillivray, Sarah Richardson, Paul Lafrance, Sebastian Clovis, Danielle Bryk, Tommy Smythe, Samantha Pynn, Tiffany Pratt, Carson Arthur, Jo Alcorn, Mia Parres, Rob Evans, Joey Fletcher, David Kenney, Kate Campbell and Colin Hunter. Each episode of the series concentrates primarily on one or two of the personalities working on the design of one particular room or outdoor space within the house, with different combinations of people taking on different rooms.

The original 20 designers and contractors returned in Season 2. Newly participating designers and contractors included Brian McCourt, Sarah Keenleyside, Sabrina Smelko, and Carson Arthur. Guest stars included Dave and Kortney Wilson from Masters of Flip, and Drew Scott and Jonathan Scott from Property Brothers.

== Episodes ==
=== Series overview ===
Season	Episodes	Originally aired	
Season	Episodes	First aired	Last aired
1	10	April 24, 2016	June 26, 2016
2	8	April 30, 2017	June 18, 2017
3	8	April 29, 2018	June 17, 2018
4	8	October 27, 2019	December 15, 2019

=== Season 1 ===
No. overall	No. in season	Title	Original release date
1	1	"Sold"	April 24, 2016
2	2	"Books, Baths and Beyond"	May 1, 2016
3	3	"Fit for a King"	May 8, 2016
4	4	"The Team Comes Clean"	May 15, 2016
5	5	"Be Our Guest!"	May 22, 2016
6	6	"The Bunker Games"	May 29, 2016
7	7	"Kitchen Party"	June 5, 2016
8	8	"Bathroom Wars"	June 12, 2016
9	9	"What's it Worth?"	June 19, 2016
10	10	"Key to the Competition"	June 26, 2016

=== Season 2 ===
No. overall	No. in season	Title	Original release date
11	1	"Leave It to Bryan... and Scott"	April 30, 2017
12	2	"Timber!"	May 7, 2017
13	3	"In the (Hail) Navy"	May 14, 1017
14	4	"Masters of Ship (Lap)"	May 21, 2017
15	5	"Be Our Guest"	May 28, 2017
16	6	"VIP Treatment"	June 4, 2017
17	7	"Love It, Not List It"	June 11, 2017
18	8	"Keys to the Competition"	June 18, 2017

=== Season 3 ===
No. overall	No. in season	Title	Original release date
19	1	"Good Things Come In Threes"	April 29, 2018
20	2	"Decks and Driveways and Drainage, Oh My!"	May 6, 2018
21	3	"Home to Swim"	May 13, 2018
22	4	"Bee Our Guest"	May 20, 2018
23	5	"Little Tikes, Big Kitchen"	May 27, 2018
24	6	"The Master Plan"	June 3, 2018
25	7	"Home to Win-ter"	June 10, 2018
26	8	"Keys to the House Competition"	June 17, 2018

=== Season 4 ===
No. overall	No. in season	Title	Original release date
27	1	"Home for the Holidays"	October 27, 2019
28	2	"Lofty Ideas"	November 3, 2019
29	3	"Two Bathrooms and a Baby"	November 10, 2019
30	4	"Sweet Dreams"	November 17, 2019
31	5	"That's a (W)rap!"	November 24, 2019
32	6	"Brian With a Y"	December 1, 2019
33	7	"The Grass Is Always Greener..."	December 8, 2019
34	8	"Oh Little Town of Home to Win"	December 15, 2019

== See also ==
- Home Free (2015 TV series), USA's analogous TV series
- HGTV Dream Home, HGTV USA's home give-a-way
