= Save My Reno =

- Starring: Sebastian Clovis; Sabrina Smelko (2016-2019); Samantha Pynn (2020-2021)
- Country of origin: Canada
- Original language: English
- No. of seasons: 4

Production
- Running time: 30 minutes

Original release
- Network: HGTV Canada
- Release: 26 August 2014 – 2021

Save My Reno is a Canadian television series featuring contractor Sebastian Clovis, a former Canadian Football League player, and designer Samantha Pynn helping homeowners complete needed renovations on a limited budget.

The series premiered in 2014 under the title Tackle My Reno, featuring Clovis assisting homeowners with renovations on his own. A single season was produced before the show was relaunched in 2016 as Save My Reno, with Clovis and Sabrina Smelko hosting the retooled show as a duo; after two seasons, Smelko left the show, with Pynn replacing her when the third season aired in 2020.

Following a fourth season in 2021, the show ended and Clovis launched the new series Gut Job. Unlike the format of Save My Reno, in Gut Job Clovis works with a variety of different designers on different projects rather than a single consistent co-host, although Pynn has appeared as the designer on some episodes of the show.

== Broadcast ==
The series premiered on HGTV Canada in Canada on 26 August 2014 with two episodes airing back-to-back each week.

Internationally, the series premiered in Australia on 21 August 2015.
