= Holmes and Holmes =

Canadian home renovation television show

Holmes and Holmes (stylized as Holmes+Holmes) is a Canadian television reality show, which premiered on HGTV Canada in 2016. The show features contractor Mike Holmes and his son Mike Holmes Jr. renovating homes.

Outside Canada, the following series, Holmes 911, is marketed as the third season of this series; Holmes 911 first aired in Canada on CTV Life. Additionally, the episodes were remade into a separate series, titled Holmes and Homes: Retooled; as with Holmes Makes it Right: Retooled, Holmes and Holmes: Retooled splices footage from the original series alongside including never-before-seen footage from the original series; the Retooled version generally focuses on the construction aspects of the project, compressing the construction timeline of each featured home of the first two seasons into two episodes each, and a single episode of the Holmes 911 homes, as opposed to spreading them across the entire length of the season as with the original series.

== History ==
The first season of the show focuses on Mike Jr., who, following his efforts to build his father the ultimate garage (as documented in the miniseries Mike's Ultimate Garage) the previous year, is challenged by his father to lead an effort to renovate his bungalow home by adding a second storey addition in order to turn his bachelor pad into a family home for him and his longtime girlfriend, Lisa.

The second season, which premiered in 2018, saw Mike and Mike Jr. going into business together and flipping three different homes.

Holmes 911, which premiered in 2019, saw Mike, accompanied by Mike Jr. and his sister Sherry, help fix and renovate homes for five different families in need.

Shelagh Cooke received a Canadian Screen Award nomination for Best Direction in a Lifestyle or Information Series at the 7th Canadian Screen Awards in 2019, for the second season episode "Water: The Good, the Bad and the Money".

== Crew ==
Through the course of the first two seasons, Mike Jr. brings with him two friends to act as his crew:

- Derek Ullman is the best friend of Mike Jr., who has been with the Holmes Crew since the start of Holmes Makes it Right.
- Rob Collier is another friend of Mike Jr. who acts as the apprentice of the team. He does not appear in Holmes 911, but is identified in later series as Mike Jr.'s brother-in-law.

Other crew members seen on-screen include the following:

- Sherry Holmes is the younger of Mike Jr.'s two older sisters. She got her start in the trades on the series Holmes in New Orleans, and is developing an eye for interior design. In the first two seasons, she helps her brother on certain jobs when extra manpower is required. On Holmes 911, she is pregnant with, and later gives birth to her first child, Cali.
- Blake Steed is the construction coordinator in the second season, and one of the crew chiefs on Holmes 911. He has been with the Holmes Crew since the start of Holmes Makes it Right, and eventually marries Sherry during the events of Holmes 911.
- Marc-Antoine Charette is a general contractor local to the Kingston, Ontario area, who Mike and Mike Jr. collaborate with on one of the homes featured in the second season. He helps oversee the construction efforts there while Mike and Mike Jr. are in the Toronto area, working on the other featured homes.
- Crystal Charette is the wife of Marc, and serves as the interior designer on the Kingston-area home featured in the second season.

Holmes 911 adds the following crew members:

- Daniel Vella is the owner of a contracting business who has been in the roles of both a hired subcontractor and Holmes Crew member in past Holmes shows; this is his second series as a Holmes Crew member, after 2018's Holmes: Next Generation. For Holmes 911, he takes on the role of a second crew chief.
- Tyler Morrison is a new member of the crew, introduced in the first episode of the season.
- Troy McKenna is a new member of the crew, introduced partway through the season.
- Bailey Harris is a new apprentice, straight from the Women in Skilled Trades program. She comes from a family of tradespeople, and got her start in the trades renovating her home with the help of her family.
- Trish Hudson is a former bartender, who is hired on as an apprentice.

Additionally, the following people have a recurring presence in the series:

- Lisa Grant is the longtime girlfriend of Mike Jr., having met as teenagers and reconnected as adults. During the events of the first season, Mike Jr. proposes to her while on a weekend date to Ottawa; they are formally married during the events of the second season. In Holmes 911 and in later series, she is introduced under her married name, Lisa Marie Holmes.

Additionally, HGTV interior designer Sarah Richardson makes guest appearances advising Mike and Mike Jr. on design aspects relating to a different home in the second season.

== Episodes ==
=== Season 1 ===
No. overall	No. in series	Title	Original release date
1	1	"A Bold Move"	November 10, 2016
2	2	"Moving Up in the World"	November 17, 2016
3	3	"Decisions, Decisions"	November 24, 2016
4	4	"Distractions and Disagreements"	December 1, 2016
5	5	"Trouble at the Finish"	December 8, 2016
6	6	"Holmes Sweet Home"	December 15, 2016

=== Season 2 ===
No. overall	No. in series	Title	Original release date
7	1	"We're in Business"	July 10, 2018
8	2	"Water: The Good, the Bad and the Money"	July 17, 2018
9	3	"Demo, Digging and Dancing"	July 24, 2018
10	4	"What Comes Down Must Go Up"	July 31, 2018
11	5	"Decisions and Delays"	August 7, 2018
12	6	"Debates, Decisions, Designers"	August 14, 2018
13	7	"Here We Go Again"	August 21, 2018
14	8	"Game Changer"	August 28, 2018
15	9	"River House of Dreams"	September 4, 2018
16	10	"Smart Suburban Holmes"	September 11, 2018
17	11	"A Thousand Goodbyes"	September 18, 2018
18	12	"The Holmes Stretch"	September 25, 2018

=== Season 3 / Holmes 911 ===
No. overall	No. in season	Title	Original release date	US release date
19	1	"Families Helping Families"	September 17, 2019	October 2, 2019
20	2	"Divide and Conquer"	September 24, 2019	October 9, 2019
21	3	"Not a Dry Eye in the House"	October 1, 2019	October 16, 2019
22	4	"Can You Dig It?"	October 8, 2019	October 23, 2019
23	5	"No Bones About It"	October 15, 2019	October 30, 2019
24	6	"Bringing the Heat"	October 22, 2019	November 6, 2019
25	7	"Unfinished Business"	October 29, 2019	October 16, 2019
26	8	"Healthy Holmes"	November 5, 2019	November 20, 2019
27	9	"A Fresh Start"	November 12, 2019	November 27, 2019
28	10	"Sticks and Stones"	November 19, 2019	December 4, 2019
29	11	"Wish Come True"	November 26, 2019	December 11, 2019
30	12	"Holmes Is Where the Heart Is"	December 3, 2019	December 18, 2019

=== Holmes and Holmes: Retooled ===
No. overall	No. in series	Title	Original release date
1	1	"Retooled: Holmes Sweet Home"	January 8, 2020
2	2	"Retooled: Holmes Sweet Home"	January 15, 2020
3	1	"Retooled: The Suburban House"	January 22, 2020
4	2	"Retooled: The Suburban House"	January 29, 2020
5	3	"Retooled: The River House"	February 5, 2020
6	4	"Retooled: The River House"	February 12, 2020
7	5	"Retooled: The Country House"	February 19, 2020
8	6	"Retooled: The Country House"	February 26, 2020
9	1	"Retooled: The Half Done House"	November 4, 2020
10	2	"Retooled: The City Barn"	June 9, 2021
11	3	"Retooled: The Twice Done House"	June 16, 2021
12	4	"Retooled: The Flood House"	June 23, 2021
13	5	"Retooled: The Toxic Townhouse"	June 30, 2021
