= Cowboy Trap =

2009 British TV series

- Genre: Consumer
- Presented by: Jonnie Irwin (2013); Clive Holland (2009–13)
- Narrated by: Jonnie Irwin
- Country of origin: United Kingdom
- Original language: English
- No. of series: 5
- No. of episodes: 130

Production
- Running time: 45 minutes

Original release
- Network: BBC One
- Release: 7 September 2009 – 6 July 2013

Cowboy Trap is a British daytime television show on BBC One, originally hosted by Clive Holland, and later presented by Jonnie Irwin. It follows homeowners who have had cowboy builders who in some cases have rendered their homes uninhabitable (two cases in each show). The team addresses the problems and usually confront the cowboy builder by a phone call, though this is not always successful. The show's second series replaced To Buy or Not to Buy.

== Series overview ==
Five series comprising 130 episodes have been broadcast.

Series	Episodes	Originally released	
Series	Episodes	First released	Last released
1	20	7 September 2009	2 October 2009
2	40	14 June 2010	19 November 2010
3	20	20 February 2012	16 March 2012
4	20	2 January 2013	29 January 2013
5	30	30 January 2013	6 July 2013

== See also ==
- Holmes on Homes, a similar show in Canada
