= Gut Job =

2022 Canadian television series

Gut Job is a Canadian home renovation reality television series created by Thunderbird Entertainment and hosted by Sebastian Clovis. The series features Clovis working on major home renovations where for structural reasons the home has to be virtually gutted and rebuilt; typically the "gut job" project is depicted over several episodes, with each episode also balancing the major renovation with smaller "B-story" projects for other homeowners.

Unlike Clovis's prior series Save My Reno, in Gut Job he does not work with a regular design co-host, instead bringing in a variety of different guest designers on different projects. Design guests on the show have included his former Save My Reno co-host Samantha Pynn, and his partner Ayanna Augustine.

The series premiered April 27, 2022 on HGTV.

It received a Canadian Screen Award nomination for Best Lifestyle Program or Series at the 11th Canadian Screen Awards in 2023.
