= Holmes Foundation =

Canadian foundation

The Holmes Foundation is a foundation created by Canadian residential contractor and television show host Mike Holmes in 2006, intended to promote skilled trades in youth. Annually, the Holmes Foundation awards up to twenty scholarships and bursaries of $1,500 to students enrolled (or enrolling) in a Canadian college or university residential construction program. These bursaries are awarded based on academic excellence and commitment to the craft, and are designed to help students complete their training with all the tools, books, and supplies they need.
