= Sarah Keenleyside =

Canadian interior designer

Sarah Keenleyside is a Canadian interior designer, best known as a host of programming for both the Corus Entertainment and Rogers Media iterations of HGTV. She should not be confused with Canadian installation artist Sarah Keenlyside.

== Biography ==
Formerly the principal designer for Qanuk Interiors, with which she specialized in renovation of Victorian-style homes, her Corus-era HGTV show Backyard Builds debuted in 2017. Cohosted with Brian McCourt, the series featured the duo helping homeowners to expand their living space by improving and adding structures to their back yards. The series received a Canadian Screen Award nomination for Best Lifestyle Program or Series at the 6th Canadian Screen Awards in 2018. Production of Backyard Builds went into hiatus due to the COVID-19 pandemic in Canada, with its final episodes airing in 2021.

In this era, she also appeared in HGTV's multi-designer shows Home to Win and Family Home Overhaul.

During the run of Backyard Builds, she married singer-songwriter Justin Rutledge in 2018. The title track of Rutledge's 2019 album Passages is a love song he wrote for her. They have two sons, and moved to Prince Edward County in 2023.

In 2026, her new show The County debuted on the Rogers version of HGTV. The series follows her as she builds her new design studio, SKDS, in Prince Edward County, both on client projects undertaken with design collaborators Jo Smeeth and Kate Lavender, and renovations to her own home with Rutledge, as well as highlighting the region's vibrant local culture of artisans and craftspeople.
