= Windy City Rehab =

American television series on HGTV

- Title card
- Genre: Reality
- Starring: Alison Victoria
- Country of origin: United States
- Original language: English
- No. of seasons: 5
- No. of episodes: 44 (+9 specials)

Production
- Executive producers: Peter Holmes; Bill Swan; Geoff Davis; Alison Victoria
- Production locations: Chicago, Illinois; United States
- Camera setup: Multi-camera
- Production company: Big Table Media

Original release
- Network: HGTV
- Release: January 1, 2019 – December 17, 2024

Windy City Rehab is an American television series on HGTV based in Chicago, Illinois and starring Alison Victoria, an interior designer who does home renovation projects. An 11-episode first season premiered on January 1, 2019. A third season began broadcasting in April 2022; and a fourth season premiered on May 23, 2023. A fifth season premiered on September 24, 2024.

== About ==
It stars Alison Victoria (also known as Alison Victoria Gramenos), an interior designer who primarily does home renovation projects in Chicago, Illinois, her hometown. In each episode in season one, a candidate house is visited by Alison and Donovan [Need to explain who is Donovan], who discuss its potential for redesign and resale value (houses are purchased without a client in mind). Unlike many HGTV programs, the majority of the projects are Chicago city-based, including townhomes and apartments. Many of the houses are more than 100 years old, and some are designated as landmarked buildings, adding challenges to the design and construction work. After purchase and development of a design plan, the duo engage in demolition work, during which unanticipated construction problems frequently emerge which add to the construction cost and schedule. The episode alternates between scenes of the construction work and scenes of Alison sourcing and purchasing salvaged furniture and decorative components (appropriate to the historical period of the house). Once construction is completed, the house is staged and prospective buyers are invited to visit to see the renovated interior and exterior.

On August 18, 2020, it was announced that the second season would premiere on September 15, 2020. Six episodes were broadcast between September 15, 2020, and October 20, 2020. In addition to focusing on home renovation projects, the season dealt with the break-up of Alison and Donovan's business over a dispute on contractor expenses. Around that time, both Alison and Donovan along with their companies and contractors were sued for shoddy work in relation to two homes rehabbed on the show.

On March 28, 2022, a third season was announced. The season began broadcasting on April 21, 2022. In season 3, in addition to Chicago projects, Alison decided to travel to Los Angeles and Atlanta for work projects.

== Episodes ==
Season	Episodes	Originally released	
Season	Episodes	First released	Last released
1	11	January 1, 2019	October 8, 2019
2	10	September 15, 2020	October 13, 2020
3	9	April 21, 2022	June 16, 2022
4	8	May 23, 2023	June 16, 2023
Specials	9	January 1, 2019	October 20, 2020
5	12	September 24, 2024	December 17, 2024

=== Season 1 (2019) ===
No. overall	No. in season	Title	Original release date	U.S. viewers (millions)
1	1	"Wabansia Made Wonderful"	January 1, 2019	N/A
Renovation of a house in the Bucktown neighborhood of Chicago.
2	2	"Lincoln Park Fourplex"	January 8, 2019	N/A
A historic home (converted to apartments) in the Lincoln Park neighborhood is renovated.
3	3	"Skyline Penthouse"	January 15, 2019	N/A
An 80s-style penthouse apartment presents design and construction challenges, including conflicts with the construction manager.
4	4	"House of Horrors"	January 22, 2019	N/A
Renovation of an old home comes with many unexpected construction problems.
5	5	"Massive Giddings Street Rebuild"	January 29, 2019	N/A
A two-unit house in Lincoln Square is renovated with uncertainty as to the reaction of a potential buyer.
6	6	"Historical Headache"	February 5, 2019	N/A
A cottage style house in the Ukrainian Village presents challenges resulting from its landmark status.
7	7	"To Sell or Not to Sell"	February 12, 2019	N/A
A house in the Bucktown neighborhood is renovated with a potential buyer in mind.
8	8	"Historic Pain or Economic Gain?"	February 19, 2019	N/A
Another landmarked house is renovated in the Wicker Park neighborhood.
9	9	"Fire Sale Fail to Dream Duplex"	February 26, 2019	N/A
Fire damage adds to the difficulty of renovating a three-unit house.
10	10	"Roof-Raising Race for Space"	March 5, 2019	N/A
Alison and Edward renovate their oldest (Civil War era) house yet.
11	11	"Bucktown Rebuild"	March 12, 2019	N/A

=== Season 2 (2020) ===
No. overall	No. in season	Title	Original release date	U.S. viewers (millions)
12	1	"Spend More to Make More"	September 15, 2020	N/A
13	2	"Bridgeport or Bust"	September 22, 2020	N/A
14	3	"Going Big on Berenice"	September 29, 2020	N/A
15	4	"Gold Coast Gold"	October 6, 2020	N/A
16	5	"Alison's Aftermath"	October 13, 2020	N/A
17	6	"Through the Cracks"	November 1, 2020	N/A
18	7	"Testing a New Area"	November 1, 2020	N/A
19	8	"New in North Center"	November 8, 2020	N/A
20	10	"Condo Gets Modern Touch"	December 19, 2020	N/A

=== Season 3 (2022) ===
No. overall	No. in season	Title	Original release date	U.S. viewers (millions)
21	1	"Time Is Not on My Side"	April 21, 2022	N/A
22	2	"New Build, Old Problems"	April 28, 2022	N/A
23	3	"Change of Scenery"	May 5, 2022	N/A
24	4	"Family Ties"	May 12, 2022	N/A
25	5	"Back to the Client Game"	May 19, 2022	N/A
26	6	"Suburban Jungle"	May 26, 2022	N/A
27	7	"From Greece to the Gold Coast"	June 2, 2022	N/A
28	8	"Suburban Stunner"	June 9, 2022	N/A
29	9	"Ground Up"	June 16, 2022	N/A

=== Season 4 (2023) ===
-->

No. overall	No. in season	Title	Original release date	U.S. viewers (millions)
30	1	"Take Two: 10 Years Later"	May 23, 2023	N/A
31	2	"Trust the Process"	May 30, 2023	N/A
32	3	"Treasures, Trinkets and Tchotchkes"	June 6, 2023	N/A
33	4	"Villa Victoria"	June 13, 2023	N/A
34	5	"A Tale of Two Houses"	June 20, 2023	N/A
35	6	"An Expensive Exit"	June 27, 2023	N/A
36	7	"The Cost of Compromise"	July 11, 2023	N/A
37	8	"Building on Borrowed Time"	July 18, 2023	N/A

Season 5 (2024)

=== Specials ===
Title	Original release date	U.S. viewers (millions)
"Millennial Marketing: High Heels, High Stakes"	January 1, 2019	N/A
"Contractor Care: High Heels, High Stakes"	January 15, 2019	N/A
"Picture-Perfect Branding: High Heels, High Stakes"	January 15, 2019	N/A
"Raise the Stakes: Wabansia Made Wonderful"	September 15, 2020	N/A
"Raise the Stakes: Lincoln Park Fourplex"	September 22, 2020	N/A
"Raise the Stakes: Skyline Penthouse"	September 29, 2020	N/A
"Raise the Stakes: House of Horrors"	October 6, 2020	N/A
"Raise the Stakes: To Sell or Not to Sell"	October 20, 2020	N/A
"Raise the Stakes: Historical Headache"	October 20, 2020	N/A
