= All American Handyman =

American reality television series

All American Handyman is a HGTV reality competition show between a group of handymen and women. The show is hosted Molly Culver, and judged by Mike Holmes and Scott McGillivray. It is a spin-off of Handyman Superstar Challenge, with similar challenges. A revamped Handyman Superstar Challenge is based on All American Handyman, called Canada's Handyman Challenge.

== Series ==
All American Handyman is a competition between handymen and handywomen with challenges based on home repair and improvement, and basic woodworking. The winner of the competition is the "All American Handyman", and is offered a development deal with HGTV. After each challenge, a number of competitors are eliminated. There are two challenges per episode. The series is based on HGTV Canada's Handyman Superstar Challenge.

== Season 1 (2010) ==
=== Top 10 Finalists ===
- Peter Wong -- WINNER
- David "Dee" Pellot
- Dennis Nourry
- Elliot Boswell
- Flagg Youngblood
- Matthew McGuire
- Rich Homburger
- Sara Ashby
- Caitlin Oliveira
- Andrew Kowalyshyn

=== Contestant progress ===
Handymen	1		2		3		4
Peter	Top 10	IN	IN	IN	IN	IN	WINNER
Dennis	Top 10	IN	IN	IN	IN	IN	OUT
Elliott	Top 10	IN	IN	LOW	LOW	LOW	OUT
Rich	Top 10	LOW	IN	IN	IN	OUT	
Dee	Top 10	IN	IN	LOW	OUT		
Andrew	Top 10	LOW	IN	OUT			
Flagg	Top 10	IN	OUT				
Caitlin	Top 10	IN	OUT				
Matthew	Top 10	OUT					
Sara	Top 10	OUT					

=== Episodes ===
==== Episode 1: Hello Contestants, Goodbye Contestants ====
The twenty finalists are given two sheets of plywood to build anything they want within the time limit of two hours. Ten finalists make it the next stage, which includes the shape challenge and quizzes on building code and tools.

==== Episode 2: Teams of Two ====
The remaining eight contestants are paired into teams and given the task of finishing a section of a room. They must install a window, drywall, wainscot, trim, and wood flooring. To top it off, contestants have to install a flat screen TV on the wall.

After dropping two more contestants, the remaining six get one hour to install a salvaged door slab (including making the door frame) on a laundry room, as well as make a shelf above the washer and dryer.

==== Episode 3: Lay Out Kitchen Designs ====
Contestants are given one hour to incorporate a refrigerator, range, dishwasher, microwave and sink into a small, L-shaped kitchen. They must design and build the cabinets and install countertops as well.

After eliminating another handyman, the final four contestants face a trio of challenges, each to be completed in 30 minutes or less: repair a broken window pane; shingle a dog house; install a toilet.

==== Episode 4: This is the End My Friends ====
The final three contestants are given the task of designing and building an outdoor space including a deck, furniture, and a barbecue grill.

== Season 2 (2011) ==
The second season is extended to have a total of 6 episodes, allowing the first to eliminate only 6 out of 20 instead of the first season's first episode where 12 out of 20 were eliminated.

=== Top 10 Finalists ===
- Allison Oropallo
- Andy Panko
- Cheryl Pokorny
- Jared Polston -- WINNER
- Kate Schorzman
- Lawrence Huffines
- Natalie Spahle
- Neil Smith
- Pete Kelley
- Shaun Killman

=== Contestant progress ===
Handymen	1	2	3		4		5		6	
Jared	Top 14	Top 10	LOW	IN	IN	IN	IN	IN	IN	WINNER
Allison	Top 14	Top 10	IN	LOW	IN	IN	IN	LOW	IN	OUT
Shaun	Top 14	Top 10	IN	IN	IN	IN	IN	IN	IN	OUT
Andy	Top 14	Top 10	IN	IN	IN	IN	IN	IN	OUT	
Cheryl	Top 14	Top 10	IN	LOW	IN	IN	LOW	OUT		
Kate	Top 14	Top 10	IN	IN	IN	LOW	OUT			
Neil	Top 14	Top 10	LOW	IN	LOW	OUT				
Lawrence	Top 14	Top 10	IN	LOW	OUT					
Natalie	Top 14	Top 10	LOW	OUT						
Pete	Top 14	Top 10	OUT							

=== Episodes ===
==== Episode 1: Make or Break ====
Initial findings, cutting down from 20 competitors to the top 14

Challenge 1:

Use two sheets of plywood to build anything the contestant wants
Low: Howard, Marcus, Chris, Edward, Mike, Tonya
Eliminated: Edward Wurch, Mike Burns, Tonya Tyler

Challenge 2:

Build a fence gate (no plans)
Low: Howard, Marcus, Chris, Josh, Andy
Eliminated: Chris Gill, Joshua Cohen, Marcus Bailey

==== Episode 2: Good on Paper ====
Challenge 1:

Rough line drawing sketch of either Adirondack chair, planter box, or a small table

- Chair: Shaun, Kurt, Neil, Allison, Stefano
- Planter: Howard, Cheryl, Jared, Natalie
- Table: Matt, Pete, Andy, Kate, Lawrence

Eliminated: Matthew, Steffano

Challenge 2:

Follow precise plans to build a toolbox

Eliminated: Kurt, Howard

==== Episode 3: Behind Closed Doors ====
Challenge 1:

Each contestant is tested one-on-one by each judge

- Mike Holmes asks questions about building codes and general building knowledge, then has them attempt to find errors in a poorly built bathroom
- Scott McGillivray has them transfer shapes from one board to cut those shapes out of another board
- Guest judge Bill Kiss, CMO of Sears Tools, tests 'tool IQ' by having difficult situations where they must select the correct tool to use

Challenge 2:

Build a staircase up to a 49 inch high platform

==== Episode 4: Terrible Twos ====
Challenge 1:

Contestants are randomly divided into teams of two. Each team must finish a room, starting from studs, they are asked to put in insulation, drywall, a window, hardwood flooring and trim, and mount a TV to the wall

The teams are:

- Shaun and Cheryl
- Allison and Andy
- Jared and Kate
- Lawrence and Neil

After the first challenge, the weakest team (Lawrence and Neil) compete one-on-one to install crown molding around a number of difficult corners

Challenge 2:

Build a brick patio from the ground up

==== Episode 5: Know it or Blow it ====
Challenge 1:

Obstacle course of 3 30 minute challenges that require prior knowledge to simply accomplish. Replacing a damaged piece of hardwood flooring, install an electrical socket and light with a switch on a wall, and build a small stack of bricks to test masonry knowledge.

Challenge 2:

Install a double door, including frame, on a linen closet. Then install a shelving system and fill it with linens.

==== Episode 6: To the Top ====
Challenge 1:

Build a large garden shed in 6 hours, with the help of 2 crew who they must manage, having the night before to plan it.

Challenge 2:

Layout and build a kitchen using random used kitchen cabinets and new appliances.

== Season 3 (2012) ==
=== Top 10 Finalists ===
- Carol Webster
- Chris Leslie
- Christopher Topp
- Julia Crawford
- Michael West
- Paul Steiner
- Rodney Boyden
- Scott Clark
- Scott Heeres
- Sonne Shields -- WINNER

=== Episodes ===
==== Episode 1: Outhouse to the Doghouse ====
"Toilet Fixes and Custom Doghouse Build"

Challenge 1
Toilet replacement
Challenge 2
Custom doghouse build

==== Episode 2: Playground Battlefield ====
"Crying Babies and Playground Battles"

Challenge 1
Perform household fixes quietly without waking a sleeping baby
Challenge 2
Build custom playground

==== Episode 3: The Dream Garage ====
"From Clutter and Chaos to the Dream Garage"

Challenge 1
Window repair
Challenge 2
Teams of 2 to rebuild garage

==== Episode 4: Inspect and Garden ====
"Handymen Turned Home Inspectors Turned Garden Builders"

Challenge 1
Find home problems and repair them
Challenge 2
Build a tranquil garden retreat

==== Episode 5: Burnt by the BBQ ====
"The Crawlspace Obstacle Course and BBQ Island Build Off"

Challenge 1
Obstacle course
Challenge 2
Build a BBQ

==== Episode 6: Kitchen Crowns the Winner ====
"Media Room Redo and a Full Kitchen Build Out for the Win"

Challenge 1
Rebuild a media room
Challenge 2
Build a kitchen
