= Urban Suburban =

- Starring: Philip DuMoulin; Sarah Daniels
- Country of origin: Canada
- Original language: English
- No. of seasons: 2
- No. of episodes: 50

Production
- Running time: 30 min.

Original release
- Network: HGTV Canada
- Release: 2011 – 2012

Urban Suburban is a Canadian reality television series, which debuted in 2011 on HGTV.

== Hosts ==
The show is hosted by Philip DuMoulin and Sarah Daniels, a brother and sister who are partners in their own real estate firm in Surrey, British Columbia; Daniels was also a traffic and weather reporter on Global BC before leaving that position to get her real estate license.

== Format ==
In each episode, Daniels and DuMoulin work with a family who are seeking to purchase their first home in a Canadian city. In each "round" of an episode, DuMoulin shows the couple an urban home, while Daniels shows a suburban one, and the couple are asked to select which of the two houses better meets their family's needs.

During the first season, the couple was also asked to compare one or more desired lifestyle amenities in the chosen neighbourhoods, such as schools, parks or recreational facilities, similarly deciding whether the urban or the suburban environment is a better fit for their family.

After three rounds of house selection, the couple is asked to reveal which of their three "winning" houses they have ultimately decided to purchase. During each round, DuMoulin and Daniels are also shown playfully bantering and trash talking each other over the strengths and weaknesses of each other's selections. This aspect of the show was inspired in part by the similar banter between Phil Spencer and Kirsty Allsop on Location, Location, Location, as well as by the duo's own family history of playful but loving sibling rivalry.

Daniels and DuMoulin have clarified in interviews that neither is really a strict partisan for one lifestyle over the other, recognizing that both lifestyles offer distinct advantages and disadvantages and that both lifestyles will be the better choice for different buyers, but that it simply worked better for the show's concept to have the two hosts each act as a consistent advocate. In fact, both Dumoulin and Daniels currently live in suburban Surrey after having grown up in urban central Vancouver.
