= Holmes Inspection =

Television series

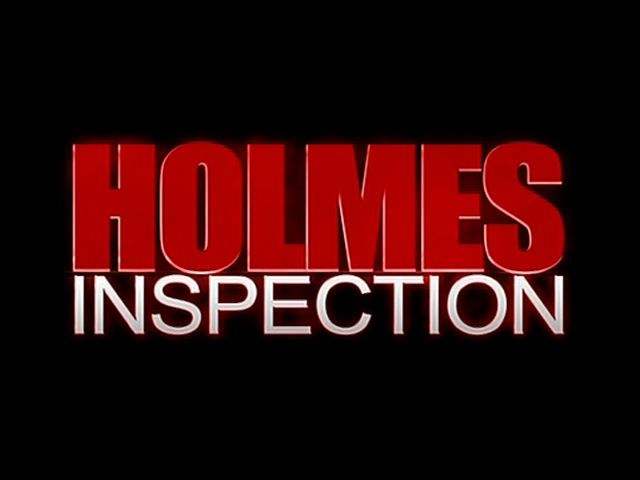
- Created by: Mike Holmes; Michael Quast; Pete Kettlewell
- Starring: Mike Holmes; Damon Bennett
- Narrated by: Mike Holmes
- Country of origin: Canada
- Original languages: English, French
- No. of seasons: 2
- No. of episodes: 52

Production
- Executive producers: Mike Holmes; Michael Quast; Pete Kettlewell
- Running time: 60 min.

Original release
- Network: HGTV Canada
- Release: October 1, 2009 – November 17, 2011

Related
- Holmes on Homes, Holmes Makes It Right

Holmes Inspection is a 2009 Canadian home renovation series on HGTV, co-hosted by general contractor Mike Holmes and construction supervisor Damon Bennett. It is the third of Holmes' renovation series, following Holmes on Homes and Holmes in New Orleans. The format of the series is similar to those of his previous series Holmes on Homes, where Mike enters a home in need of repair and often finds substandard work. However, unlike Holmes on Homes, whose focus was on substandard work done by fraudulent or poor-quality contractors, the focus of Holmes Inspection is on homeowners who have been victimized solely as a result of poor home inspections. While Holmes Inspection has been fairly popular, some within the home inspection community have criticized the show's presentation of their business. For example, Andrew Christie of Safe Homes Canada has critiqued Holmes Inspection as being more about comedy and exciting made-for-TV type scenes than about the actual work done by home inspectors.

In the United States, the series debuted on HGTV on Sunday, December 19, 2010.

== Differences from Holmes on Homes ==
Changes from Holmes on Homes include decreased emphasis on Mike Holmes during the construction process, as crew supervisor Damon Bennett (who has held the title since season 6 of Holmes on Homes) takes control of most of the construction activity (deferring to Mike only on major decisions); Damon is also present in front of the camera for meetings with the homeowners (unlike Holmes on Homes, where only Mike appears).

There is also the use of 3D computer-generated imagery to illustrate problems and solutions.

Holmes Inspection is entirely shot in the Greater Toronto area, and only involves homes which were purchased within 18 months. As the series is heavily focused on home inspections gone wrong, only homes with issues not accounted for in a home inspection report done with a home inspection service are considered.

== Crew ==
Most of the crew from Holmes on Homes and Holmes in New Orleans return for Holmes Inspection.

- Damon Bennett is the crew supervisor, having appeared since season 4 of Holmes on Homes, being elevated to the role of crew supervisor in season 6. He is skilled in many trades, and comes from a long line of bricklayers.
- Bill Bell, Mike Holmes's uncle, is the truck supervisor, in charge of tools. He has held this position since season 6 of Holmes on Homes.
- Adam Belanger is the ex son-in-law of Mike Holmes, having married Mike's eldest daughter Amanda in between series (Amanda herself has been on the production crew since season 2 of Holmes on Homes), they have since divorced and Amanda has remarried. He is an expert in operating heavy machinery, and is experienced in landscaping. He has been with the Holmes crew since season 5 of Holmes on Homes.
- Rob Brown is a member of the Holmes Inspection crew, debuting in the second season of the series.
- Nichole Faucher is a member of the Holmes Inspection crew, debuting in the second season of the series.
- Mike Holmes, Jr. ("M.J.") is the only son and youngest child of Mike Holmes, who, after graduating from high school in season 4 of Holmes on Homes (but having sporadically appeared in previous seasons), has joined his father's construction crew.
- Sherry Holmes, Mike Holmes's daughter, joined the construction crew in New Orleans and has been a member for two and a half years.
- Evan Jatou is a new member of the Holmes Inspection crew, debuting in the second season of the series.
- Carl "Carlito" Pavlovic has been with the Holmes Crew since season 5 of Holmes on Homes. He is known for his sense of humor and serves as the team's tile expert.

=== Former crew members ===
- Kate Campbell was a crew member for the first season of Holmes Inspection. She has a lifelong passion for the trades, and acquired her training in Women in Skilled Trades, later joining Holmes on Homes as their second female crew member. She is now part of the crew for another of HGTV's series, Decked Out.

== Episodes ==
=== Season 1 ===
No. overall	No. in series	Title	Original release date
1	1	"Soaked"	October 1, 2009
The Holmes Crew arrive at a townhouse with a mysterious leak in the bathroom, caused by a hole in the bathtub itself. A further glance at the home reveals a dangerous lack of insulation and a basement window drywalled from the inside that is dangerously close to a gas meter.
2	2	"Frigid Floor"	October 8, 2009
The Holmes Crew arrive at a house with a kitchen addition with overloaded electrical circuits and a permeating odour.
3	3	"Abated Breath"	October 15, 2009
The Holmes Crew arrive at a house, where asbestos in the home is threatening the health of the homeowners and their young family.
4	4	"Exhausting the Issue"	October 22, 2009
The Holmes Crew arrive at a house that had been flipped, but finds that the featured stone fireplace, among other things, is shoddily done.
5	5	"Go with the Flow"	October 29, 2009
The Holmes Crew arrive at a house with two fireplaces, which are hiding a major problem the home inspectors had overlooked.
6	6	"Holding It In"	November 5, 2009
The Holmes Crew arrive at a house on the request of a homeowner who had found mould growing on their children's toys. A further look into their storage closet reveals that it was a room that should have never been closed in.
7	7	"Troubled Waters"	November 12, 2009
The Holmes Crew visit a house, whose home inspector had missed several glaring problems, and attempts to fix them only made things worse.
8	8	"Full of Surprises"	November 19, 2009
The Holmes Crew visit a house that was rated "eight out of ten" by a home inspector, but freezing pipes and backed up drains are hiding an "eight out of ten" potential for disaster.
9	9	"No More Down and Out"	November 26, 2009
The Holmes Crew arrive at a house which had seemed okay... until a satellite dish installer discovers that the roof was rotten and the dish could not be installed.
10	10	"Heated Issue"	December 3, 2009
The Holmes Crew arrive at a house with an old rotting ductwork system that must be totally redone.
11	11	"A Hole Lot of History"	December 10, 2009
12	12	"A Hole Lot of History"	December 17, 2009
The Holmes Crew arrive at an old historical house, where major issues were popping up despite the home inspector's claims that there were none. Most problems were attributed to a hole in the foundation which had been concealed.
13	13	"Watch Your Step"	January 7, 2010
The Holmes Crew find themselves at a suburban home which has more house than furniture, due to the problems that have popped up.
14	14	"A Century Ago"	April 15, 2010
The Holmes Crew arrive at the request of the homeowners, whose home inspection report stated that only minor do-it-yourself repairs were needed. When the homeowners proceeded to do these fixes, however, it becomes clear that these issues were greatly understated. This episode is dedicated to Virgil Duntin, an electrician who appeared on a number of episodes on both Holmes on Homes and this series; this episode was his last appearance on the series prior to his passing.
15	15	"A Stitch in Time"	April 22, 2010
The Holmes Crew arrive at a house where the home inspector missed signs of obvious neglect that could lead directly to much bigger issues.
16	16	"No Breathing Room"	April 29, 2010
The Holmes Crew fix a house that was hastily inspected, and find that the house has electrical issues that make it unsafe for the homeowners' children, as well as a roofing problem that causes mould to appear in every wall of the house. This episode is dedicated to Robert Graves, one of the roofers whose company regularly appeared on Mike Holmes' series since the beginning of Holmes on Homes, and became the exclusive roofers for the series since the third season therein. Graves had been killed in an auto accident on Ontario Highway 11 north of Barrie, Ontario on September 17, 2009, and this episode was his last appearance on the series prior to his death.
17	17	"New Beginnings"	May 6, 2010
The Holmes Crew help a policewoman on disability who downsized to a townhouse that she could afford for herself and her daughter.
18	18	"Sump-Thing New"	May 13, 2010
The Holmes Crew help a couple (victims of a previous bad home inspection) who decided to upgrade to a new house, confident that it would have fewer problems. Once again, the home inspector reported only minor issues, but missed other bigger problems.
19	19	"Acres of Pain"	May 20, 2010
The Holmes Crew arrive at a dream house built on three acres that has much more serious safety issues than what was mentioned in the home inspection report.
20	20	"Back to the Drawing Board"	May 27, 2010
The Holmes Crew arrive at a house that was negotiated down in price based on the issues raised in the home inspection report. The homeowners put in thousands of dollars and hours into repairs, but they're now discovering things the home inspector missed. This episode was also the last episode of four (two on Holmes on Homes and two in this series) that featured deck builder Paul Lafrance before he began to star in his own HGTV series, Decked Out.
21	21	"Terminated"	June 3, 2010
The Holmes Crew help a family with asbestos wrapped ducts which the home inspector saw, but said that the house was beautifully renovated so there was no need to disturb them. However, the house hides a serious termite infestation that threatens to compromise the home's integrity.
22	22	"A Load of Trouble"	June 10, 2010
23	23	"A Load of Trouble"	June 17, 2010
The Holmes Crew arrive at a house where issues with sloped floors and sticking doors on the second floor are far more serious than reported. After a further series of inspections revealing that portions of the house were caving in or were in danger of doing so, the Holmes crew are forced to gut the house and rebuild it from the ground up.
24	24	"Headroom Headache"	June 24, 2010
The Holmes Crew arrive at a home that has problems in the backyard. The home inspector pointed out a few things that needed doing, but downplayed the homeowners' concerns.
25	25	"Plumb Unlucky"	July 1, 2010
The Holmes Crew help a woman who decided to skip the home inspection. Now she has toilets that don't flush, a shower that takes days to drain, some odd wiring and no heat in the kitchen.
26	26	"Heads Up Heating"	July 8, 2010
The Holmes Crew arrive at a home where the family room and two bedrooms are freezing, and the kitchen windows are leaking water.

=== Season 2 ===
No. overall	No. in series	Title	Original release date
27	1	"Little House, Big Trouble"	January 6, 2011
A woman's small home needs more work than she imagined.
28	2	"Backyard Blues"	January 13, 2011
Newlyweds struggle to repair the things missed by an inspector.
29	3	"Cold Welcome"	January 20, 2011
New issues threaten a family's safety.
30	4	"Failing Grade"	January 27, 2011
A single mother is misled about a leaky basement and roof.
31	5	"Ducts in a Row"	February 3, 2011
Heating and venting issues were missed during a house inspection.
32	6	"Pane-full Truth"	February 10, 2011
A home inspector advises a man to paint and caulk basement windows.
33	7	"Down the Drain"	February 17, 2011
New parents learn that their backyard floods in the rain and their bedrooms are too cold.
34	8	"Pump Up the Heat"	February 24, 2011
Homeowners need to act without a home inspection.
35	9	"Cold Front"	March 3, 2011
A home is filled with squirrels.
36	10	"Rail Against the Deck"	March 10, 2011
After the rushed sale of their home, a family is eager to move into a new home.
37	11	"Path of Destruction"	March 17, 2011
Elena and Giulia just chose a home as close to the city centre as possible.
38	12	"Something Stinks"	March 24, 2011
After discovering a foul odor in their home, a couple wonder what the home inspector missed.
39	13	"Cozying It Up"	March 31, 2011
A home inspection does not turn up leaks, electrical issues and potential health hazards.
40	14	"Looks Are Deceiving"	September 1, 2011
41	15	"Looks Are Deceiving"	September 1, 2011
Jennifer and Paul's inspector may have missed some big problems.
42	16	"Gettign Hosed"	September 8, 2011
A family did not read their home inspection report before their closing.
43	17	"Moisture Madness"	September 15, 2011
Kristen and Grant spent the top of their budget to buy a downtown storefront property that had been beautifully renovated. Happy with the sparkling kitchen and bath, they were blind to signs of trouble.
44	18	"Through the Roof"	September 22, 2011
A couple wants to upgrade to a new home.
45	19	"Stacked Against Us"	September 29, 2011
Frozen pipes, cracked walls and leaking prove an inspection missed issues.
46	20	"Attic Dealbreaker"	October 6, 2011
A couple allows a family friend to do their home inspection.
47	21	"Bigger Not Better"	October 13, 2011
Mitzi and Cory's big suburban house.
48	22	"Trouble Overhead"	October 20, 2011
A renovated bungalow has issues.
49	23	"Minor Finds, Major Fixes"	October 27, 2011
A woman and her son search for a smaller home.
50	24	"Bigger Bungle"	November 3, 2011
After trading up for a larger bungalow, a couple learns renovations could put them over-budget.
51	25	"Below Grade"	November 10, 2011
In the rush to find a home, an inspector missed many issues.
52	26	"Steamed"	November 17, 2011
A blended family has their townhouse inspected.

Preceded by Holmes in New Orleans	Mike Holmes series 2009-2012	Succeeded by Best of Holmes on Homes
