= Sebastian Clovis =

Canadian football player (born 1979)

Profile
- Position: FS

Personal information
- Born: September 1, 1979 (age 47); London, England
- Listed height: 6 ft 1 in (1.85 m)
- Listed weight: 206 lb (93 kg)

Career information
- University: Saint Mary's
- CFL draft: 2005: 4th round, 34th overall pick

Career history
- 2005–2007: BC Lions
- 2008: Saskatchewan Roughriders

Awards and highlights
- Grey Cup champion (2006); 2× CIS All-Canadian (2003, 2004); 2× Vanier Cup champion (2001, 2002); OFSAA gold medalist
- Stats at CFL.ca (archive)

Sebastian James Clovis (born September 1, 1979) is a Canadian television personality and former Canadian Football League (CFL) player, who played free safety for the BC Lions in their Grey Cup championship 2006 season. He is currently known as an HGTV home renovation host, appearing on the television series Tackle My Reno, Save My Reno, Home to Win and Gut Job.

== Childhood ==
Born in London, England, Clovis migrated to Canada with his family when he was six years old. He grew up in the east end of Toronto, in his family home where he was first introduced to carpentry and building. He is the eldest of five siblings; his brother Tristan Clovis was also a Canadian Football League player for the Saskatchewan Roughriders.

Clovis attended the all-boys Catholic high school, Neil McNeil High School, where he was a competitive athlete in track & field and football, which he pursued after school with the Scarborough Thunder Football Club. In his final year of high school, he attended Senator O'Connor College School where he played on the senior boys football team.

== College career ==
Clovis received a scholarship to Mississippi State University and later transferred to Saint Mary's University in Halifax, Nova Scotia where he played for their football team, the Huskies.

== CFL career ==
Clovis was drafted by the BC Lions in the 2005 CFL draft. After being sidelined with a torn ACL in the 2005 season, he came back to play all 18 games with the Lions during their 2006 Grey Cup winning season. Suffering another season-ending injury midway through the 2007 season, he was forced to rehabilitate from a second ACL tear. Returning from reconstructive knee surgery for a second time, he was traded to the Winnipeg Blue Bombers, but transferred to the Saskatchewan Roughriders midseason and remained with the Roughriders for the rest of his CFL playing career.

His nickname is "The Missile".

== TV career ==
After retiring from football, Clovis trained as a construction contractor. He debuted as the host of Tackle My Reno in 2014, and continues to cohost the spinoff series Save My Reno. As of April, 2022, he will be launching his latest show, Gut Job, his fifth for HGTV Canada.
