= Scott McGillivray =

Contractor, entrepreneur, investor and television host

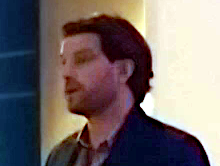
- McGillivray in Dorval, Québec, Canada in 2019
- Born: April 7, 1978 (age 48); Richmond Hill, Ontario, Canada
- Occupations: Entrepreneur, investor, television host, author, educator
- Known for: Income Property
- Spouse: Sabrina McGillivray
- Children: 2
- Website: www.scottmcgillivray.com

Scott McGillivray (born April 7, 1978) is a Canadian entrepreneur and television host.

McGillivray is the host and executive producer of the series Income Property, a home renovation show on HGTV Canada and the DIY Network Canada; and HGTV and DIY Network in the United States. He is a judge on HGTV's All American Handyman with Mike Holmes and on Canada's Handyman Challenge along with Mike Holmes, Bryan Baeumler and Paul Lafrance.

== Background ==
McGillivray was born and raised in Toronto, Ontario, Canada. He attended the University of Guelph where he received an honours degree in Commerce in 2001. After college, McGillivray began working as a property developer, purchasing homes which he would then renovate and rent out. In 2004, he became a licensed contractor and began to manage his own crews.

McGillivray is CEO of McGillivray Group, McGillivray Entertainment, and co-founder of Keyspire. He is also a real estate investor in properties across North America.

He is married to Sabrina McGillivray and has two daughters. The family divides their time between residences in Toronto, Ontario, and Fort Myers, Florida. He has a brother and a sister.

== Television series ==
=== Income Property (2009–2016) ===
Income Property is a TV show in which McGillivray helps homeowners turn part of their home into a money-maker to help with the mortgage, on HGTV Canada. In each episode, he presents the homeowners with renovation options to turn their space into a legal rental unit. The audience sees the renovation and the final reveals. The show premiered in 2009 and the 100th episode aired in 2013. Income Property expanded from a half-hour to an hour format in 2013. In 2014, it returned to being a half-hour show.

In the half-hour format, McGillivray comes in to help homeowners with their existing properties, renovating them for a profitable rental unit. In the full-hour format, he helps people buy homes and then renovate them to include a profitable rental unit. There have been several themed seasons, alongside regular non-themed ones, and the full-hour show can be seen as a themed season, along with others, that focused on particular kinds of rental properties.

As of 2013, it aired in 33 countries around the world.

=== Moving the McGillivrays (2016) ===
With Moving the McGillivrays, McGillivray and his wife and daughters buy and renovate a house into their permanent residence, on HGTV Canada. They end up choosing a fixer-upper that they tear down due to renovation costs to build their home.

=== Buyers Bootcamp with Scott McGillivray (2018) ===
On Buyers Bootcamp, instead of McGillivray helping buyers purchase new properties and turn them into income properties (as in the full hour version of Income Property), he helps buyers renovate and flip properties.

In the 2016 pilot, for HGTV Canada, he helped owners choose a property to buy and renovate, to flip for a profit. In the series order, for HGTV (USA), he comes on board as a partner to help renovate investment properties and flip them for profit. One season aired in 2018.

=== Vacation House Rules (2020) ===
Vacation House Rules is similar to Income Property. The unique factor for this show is that the homes featured are all vacation cottages. McGillivray and the owners renovate properties into upscale investment vacation rentals.

=== Renovation Resort (2023) ===
Renovation Resort (Renovation Resort Showdown in the U.S.) enlists Bryan Baeumler to help McGillivray turn his recently purchased lakeside resort from a total wreck into a one-of-a-kind vacation rental. Renovation Resort premiered on HGTV Canada in spring 2023, and summer 2023 on HGTV USA. It is similar to Baeumler's other show, Island of Bryan/Renovation Island, in that it renovates a resort. The show is a 7-episode competition series, featuring 4 teams of contractor-designer duos advised by McGillivray and Baeumler, who renovate cabin-by-cabin competing head-to-head. The winning cabin gets the winning team the grand prize.

== Other series ==
McGillivray has been featured on other shows for HGTV and HGTV Canada.

=== Debbie Travis' Facelift (2003–2005) and From the Ground Up with Debbie Travis (2006) ===
McGillivray got his start in TV as a crew member and later, as project manager with Debbie Travis on her home improvement reality TV shows.

=== Holiday Battle on the Block HGTV (2007) ===
McGillivray and Kim Myles co-host this homeowner competition for the best holiday-decorated home.

=== All American Handyman (2010–2012) ===
McGillivray is a co-host on HGTV's show All American Handyman with Mike Holmes.

=== Canada's Handyman Challenge (2012–2014) ===
McGillivray is a judge on the HGTV Canada show Canada's Handyman Challenge along with Mike Holmes, Bryan Baeumler and Paul LaFrance.

=== Flipping the Block (2014) ===
In Flipping the Block, McGillivray is a judge rating the renovation abilities of four couples competing to win money at auction in a home-flipping competition. The teams transform identical run-down condos — then sell them to the highest bidder. Scott McGillivray guest judges alongside Nicole Curtis, David Bromstad and host Josh Temple.

=== Home to Win (2015) ===
On HGTV Canada's Home to Win, McGillivray was a guest renovator, renovating a house for a worthy family to win, who were selected by the producers.

=== The Real Estate Rebel ===
The Real Estate Rebel is a podcast by McGillivray.

== Books ==
In 2014, McGillivray wrote his first home improvement book in which he advises homeowners how to make the most of their renovation investments.

- How to Add Value to your Home (2014), HarperCollins Canada

McGillivray has co-authored a number of real estate investing books with business partner Michael Sarracini.

- Cash Flow for Life (2012)
- Quick Start to Cash Flow (2011)
- The Investors Tool Kit (2011)

== Business Projects ==
Keyspire (Lifetime Wealth Academy)

In 2010, McGillivray started his own real estate education company called The Lifetime Wealth Academy, which was later renamed to Keyspire in 2013. Keyspire runs investing training sessions and workshops.

Live Speaking Events

McGillivray started his own live speaking events titled "Creating Wealth through Real Estate" in 2009 to educate people about real estate investing. This event became #TheWealthTour in 2015.

== See also ==
- Mike Holmes
- Bryan Baeumler
- Paul LaFrance
