= Decked Out =

Television series

- Starring: Paul Lafrance
- Country of origin: Canada
- Original language: English
- No. of seasons: 4
- No. of episodes: 50

Production
- Executive producer: Mike Sheerin
- Running time: 30 min.
- Production companies: Architect Films; Tricon Film & Television

Original release
- Network: HGTV Canada

Decked Out is a Canadian home renovation television series, which airs on HGTV Canada since 2011. Hosted by Paul Lafrance, a contractor who owns Cutting Edge Construction and Design in Pickering, Ontario, each episode depicts Lafrance and his team designing and building a unique and dramatic deck for a client.

== Related developments ==
Prior to launching his own series, Lafrance appeared on several episodes of Breakfast Television and Holmes Inspection.

Lafrance subsequently also launched Deck Wars, a spinoff program in which he moderates a competition between two homeowners each building their own decks, with the Decked Out crew providing build support. Lafrance and company then got aboard Disaster Decks, which inverts Decked Out, going for disastrous decks to rehabilitate or rebuild instead of custom dream decks of Decked Out. Lafrance and his crew went on to do Custom Built making custom furniture and doing customized construction of rooms in houses.
