= Income Property =

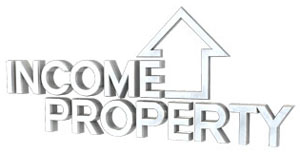
- Income Property logo
- Genre: Home improvement / reality
- Developed by: RTR Media
- Presented by: Scott McGillivray
- Country of origin: Canada
- Original language: English
- No. of seasons: 11
- No. of episodes: 155 + 2 specials

Production
- Executive producers: Seasons 1–2: Kit Redmond, Debbie Travis and Hans Rosenstein; Season 3: Kit Redmond and Grazyna Krupa; Seasons 4–7: Kit Redmond, Scott McGillivray and Jenna Keane
- Running time: Seasons 1–6: 21–22 minutes Seasons 7–9: 42–43 minutes Seasons 10–11: 21–22 minutes

Original release
- Network: HGTV Canada
- Release: September 29, 2008 – April 20, 2016

Income Property is a Canadian home-improvement program hosted by Scott McGillivray. The series premiered on HGTV Canada on September 29, 2008, and on January 1, 2009, on HGTV in the United States. The program was a half-hour long for the first six seasons and then expanded to an hour-long format starting with season 7. The show reverted to its half-hour format with the start of season 10.

On March 8, 2016, it was named Best Lifestyle Program or Series at the 4th Canadian Screen Awards.

The series is no longer in production. McGillivray now hosts Scott's Vacation House Rules, which focuses specifically on renovating vacation rentals in cottage country.

== About the show ==
Real estate investor and contractor Scott McGillivray leads homeowners through the renovation of their first income property, to help offset mortgage payments, as well as increase the overall value of the home. In each episode, McGillivray offers design options, prepares plans for a conversion and manages the construction of a rental suite. McGillivray, who owns over 20 income-generating homes that he has converted and renovated himself, communicates confidence and skill to help lead homeowners through the ups and downs of renovating their income suite.

Several episodes of the series have featured celebrity homeowners, including actress Helene Joy, musician Justin Rutledge, broadcaster Roz Weston and documentary filmmaker Jamie Kastner.

== Show format ==
=== Seasons 1–6 (2008–2012) ===
For the first six seasons, the show was a half-hour. In this format, McGillivray meets with the homeowners to see the space in its current form. McGillivray shows two options to the homeowners for a possible redevelopment, utilizing design software. Each potential option has an estimated return on investment by way of monthly rent received. McGillivray shares the homeowners' mortgage payment and subtracts the estimated market rents to provide a "lower" mortgage payment. One option is generally grander in scope, usually affording the homeowner the opportunity to make more in rent than the other option, but at a higher renovation cost.

Once the homeowners decide on which option they prefer, the Income Property team goes to work to demolish and rebuild. The homeowners are usually involved in the renovation but then are kept out of the space during the final stages of completion to provide some element of surprise.

Once the renovation is complete, McGillivray obtains an opinion of value from a real estate appraiser or real estate agent, both for the amount of rent that can be charged, as well as to the overall increase in value to the property. During the reveal of the newly redeveloped space, McGillivray shows the staged rental suite and provides the new value of the home and estimated rental income to the homeowners.

The closing of the show has McGillivray verbally discussing the features of the suite, much like a newspaper ad would do. Then the show provides an inter-title of the result after filming showing the amount of rent the homeowners actually got once the unit hit the market. In some episodes, the homeowners did not rent out for various reasons.

In Canada, seasons 4 and 5 both aired during the same year, with season 4 airing in the spring of 2011, and season 5 airing in the fall. Seasons 4 and 6 saw two new episodes airing back-to-back each week, with the exception of the last three episodes of season 6, which aired once-per-week, successively.

=== Seasons 7–9 (2013–2014) ===
Starting with season 7, and through to season 9, the show expanded from its original half-hour format to a one-hour format, with one new episode airing each week. During the first half-hour, McGillivray follows potential new homeowners as they view three homes up for sale with income property potential. The second half-hour follows the same format as the original, with McGillivray showing the new homeowners two renovation options, the conversion of the space based on their choice, getting an opinion of value, and the reveal of the finished renovation/suggested rent/increased home value. A new opening sequence was created for the new hour-long format, which included the graphic "Buy it. Build it. Bank it."

Seasons 7 and 8 both aired during 2013 in Canada, with season 7 airing during the winter/spring, and season 8 airing in the fall.

=== Season 10 (2015) ===
Starting with Season 10, the show reverted to its original half-hour format, with two new episodes airing back-to-back each week, in Canada. It follows the same format as the first six seasons, except that after McGillivray shows the homeowners the options, he starts the renovation before the homeowners decide which option they will go with. Once he gets to a certain point, he then asks the homeowners which option they have decided on so that he can proceed. The opening sequence created at the start of the new hour-long format is still used, but has been edited, with some of the beginning removed, and the words "Buy it" removed from the original "Buy it. Build it. Bank it." graphic. The tenth season also saw the episode count increase from the usual 13 to 24. Four of these episodes (aired April 9 and April 16) see McGillivray tackling vacation rental properties.

=== Season 11 (2016) ===
Season 11 changes its focus to the rental market of vacation properties, with the tagline "On Vacation" added on to the Income Property title. Episodes retain their half-hour format from season 10, and feature Scott McGillivray guiding holiday homeowners through the process of building a vacation suite and banking the rental cheques.

== Specials ==
=== Reno to Riches ===
Airing April 4, 2011, one week prior to the start of the fourth season, this one-hour special finds Scott McGillivray revisiting ten Income Property homeowners to find out how much cash they’ve collected and how it has transformed their lives. Throughout the show, a running tally adds up the rental income from three seasons of Income Property to find out exactly how much money these new landlords have collected.

=== Top 10 Income Property Renos ===
Airing on April 19, 2012, one week in advance of the premiere of the sixth season, this one-hour special is very much similar to the "Reno to Riches" special, and sees Scott McGillivray counting down the top ten Income Property transformations from the first five seasons. With each reno, he highlights the smart renovations that helped add incredible value to the property.

== Episodes ==
Episode listings reflect original Canadian air dates and episode titles.

=== Season 1 (2008) ===
No.	Title	Original release date
1	"Connie & Sebastian"	September 29, 2008
2	"Jay & Kathryn"	October 6, 2008
3	"Kirk & Stephanie"	October 13, 2008
4	"Peter"	October 20, 2008
5	"Martin & Isadora"	October 27, 2008
6	"Tai & Trish"	November 3, 2008
7	"Elliot"	November 10, 2008
8	"Heather"	November 17, 2008
9	"Samantha & Andrew"	November 24, 2008
10	"Sean & Ania"	December 1, 2008
11	"Shawn & Sarah"	December 8, 2008
12	"Brad & Nikki"	December 15, 2008
13	"Steve"	December 22, 2008

=== Season 2 (2009) ===
No.	Title	Original release date
1	"Daria & James"	September 28, 2009
2	"Julia & Andy"	October 5, 2009
3	"Jen & In-Suk"	October 12, 2009
4	"Evelyn & Armel"	October 19, 2009
5	"Rob & Allison"	October 26, 2009
6	"Lise & Andre"	November 2, 2009
7	"Alice & Cindy"	November 9, 2009
8	"Anne & Karen"	November 16, 2009
9	"Marsha, Ellwood & Sarah"	November 23, 2009
10	"Victoria & Evan"	November 30, 2009
11	"Adam & Jamie"	December 7, 2009
12	"David"	December 14, 2009
13	"Fernando & David"	December 21, 2009

=== Season 3 (2010) ===
No.	Title	Original release date
1	"Jeremy & Angie"	September 6, 2010
2	"Lori & Henri"	September 13, 2010
3	"Courtney & Emily"	September 20, 2010
4	"Bonnie & Merv"	September 27, 2010
5	"Laura & Peter"	October 4, 2010
6	"Antoinette & Mike"	October 11, 2010
7	"Crystal & Courtney"	October 18, 2010
8	"Rushad & Lizzy"	October 25, 2010
9	"Andrea & Luke"	November 1, 2010
10	"Tracey"	November 8, 2010
11	"Kerry"	November 15, 2010
12	"Lisa"	November 22, 2010
13	"Matt & Lisa"	November 29, 2010

=== Season 4 (2011) ===
No.	Title	Original release date
Special	"Reno to Riches"	April 4, 2011
1	"Martha & Darryl"	April 11, 2011
2	"Sabrina & Daryl"	April 11, 2011
3	"Claire & Ryan"	April 18, 2011
4	"Lori"	April 18, 2011
5	"Barb & Jamie"	April 25, 2011
6	"Nancy"	April 25, 2011
7	"Dale & Erin"	May 2, 2011
8	"Kat & Al"	May 2, 2011
9	"Manny & Jessica"	May 9, 2011
10	"Melanie & Pavan"	May 9, 2011
11	"Chris & Haelee"	May 16, 2011
12	"Rachael & Steve"	May 16, 2011
13	"Brendan"	May 23, 2011

=== Season 5 (2011) ===
No.	Title	Original release date
1	"Jasmine"	September 8, 2011
2	"Vanessa & Carmen"	September 15, 2011
3	"Jung & Angie"	September 22, 2011
4	"Raphael & Monica"	September 29, 2011
5	"Arun & Rosalina"	October 6, 2011
6	"Patricia & Manny"	October 13, 2011
7	"Susan"	October 20, 2011
8	"Nelson & Sarah"	October 27, 2011
9	"Naomi & Scot"	November 3, 2011
10	"Reena & Kulvir"	November 10, 2011
11	"Laura & George"	November 17, 2011
12	"David & Peter"	November 24, 2011
13	"Sean"	December 1, 2011

=== Season 6 (2012) ===
No.	Title	Original release date
Special	"Top 10 Income Property Renos"	April 19, 2012
1	"Cliff & Thyrza"	April 26, 2012
2	"Carol"	April 26, 2012
3	"Nadia & Gino"	May 3, 2012
4	"Diana"	May 3, 2012
5	"Susan & Jeff"	May 10, 2012
6	"Rob & Tricia"	May 10, 2012
7	"Tiffany & Jamie"	May 17, 2012
8	"Rita & Eric"	May 17, 2012
9	"Ross"	May 24, 2012
10	"Josephine"	May 24, 2012
11	"Andrew"	July 25, 2012
12	"Rui"	August 1, 2012
13	"Jerry & Amee"	August 8, 2012

=== Season 7 (2013) ===
No.	Title	Original release date
1	"Marli & Toby"	January 31, 2013
2	"Karen & Kevin"	February 7, 2013
3	"Jeff & Kirsti"	February 14, 2013
4	"Alison & Deirdre"	February 21, 2013
5	"Dan & Tania"	February 28, 2013
6	"Kuo-Bao & Megan"	March 7, 2013
7	"Andrew & Chris"	March 14, 2013
8	"Stephanie & Elyse"	March 21, 2013
9	"Mary & Bridge"	March 28, 2013
10	"Marko & Jackie"	April 4, 2013
11	"Jason & Peky"	April 11, 2013
12	"Mike & Vita"	April 18, 2013
13	"Sarah & Milo"	April 25, 2013

=== Season 8 (2013) ===
No.	Title	Original release date
1	"Michael & Karen"	September 19, 2013
2	"Matt & Sarah"	September 26, 2013
3	"Marissa & Bryan"	October 3, 2013
4	"Ann-Marie & Scott"	October 10, 2013
5	"Jen & Brock"	October 17, 2013
6	"Erin"	October 24, 2013
7	"Sarah & Jim"	October 31, 2013
8	"Nick & Karen"	November 7, 2013
9	"Joseph"	November 14, 2013
10	"Sidra"	November 21, 2013
11	"David & Lucia"	November 28, 2013
12	"Grant & Eve"	December 5, 2013
13	"Allan & Nasreen"	December 12, 2013

=== Season 9 (2014) ===
No.	Title	Original release date
1	"Nicole & Michelle"	April 3, 2014
2	"Cory & Julie"	April 10, 2014
3	"Rodrigo & Ana"	April 17, 2014
4	"Cheryl & Amreed"	April 24, 2014
5	"Lysa & Jen"	May 1, 2014
6	"Robert & Stephanie"	May 8, 2014
7	"Jamie"	May 15, 2014
8	"Miranda & Fab"	May 22, 2014
9	"Jessica & Aaron"	June 19, 2014
10	"Sherief & Christine"	June 26, 2014
11	"Yoni & Shannon"	July 3, 2014
12	"Adrian & Jennifer"	July 10, 2014
13	"Alexis & Craig"	July 17, 2014

=== Season 10 (2015) ===
No.	Title	Original release date
1	"Paul & Angela"	February 26, 2015
2	"Andrew & Maria"	February 26, 2015
3	"Vic & Amie"	March 5, 2015
4	"Nellie & Joe"	March 5, 2015
5	"Jeff & Lee"	March 12, 2015
6	"Leanne, Michelle & Richard"	March 12, 2015
7	"Liza, Mary & Stella"	March 19, 2015
8	"Kathy & Fanche"	March 19, 2015
9	"Jen & Paul"	March 26, 2015
10	"Leah & Stew"	March 26, 2015
11	"Rob & Heidi"	April 2, 2015
12	"Pat, Kelly & Nancy"	April 2, 2015
13	"Roz & Katherine"	April 9, 2015
14	"Rebecca & Stew"	April 9, 2015
15	"Mike & Andrea"	April 16, 2015
16	"Anne & Jody"	April 16, 2015
17	"Helene & Renna"	April 23, 2015
18	"Kat & Andrew"	April 23, 2015
19	"Dany & Genevieve"	April 30, 2015
20	"Sheri & Dan"	April 30, 2015
21	"Michael & Kristine"	May 7, 2015
22	"Ashley & Tyler"	May 7, 2015
23	"Kim & Tracy"	May 14, 2015
24	"Asad"	May 14, 2015

=== Season 11 (2016) ===
Season 11 focuses on vacation rental properties.

No.	Title	Original release date
1	"Justin"	March 9, 2016
2	"Shannon & Noah"	March 9, 2016
3	"Paddy & Brian"	March 16, 2016
4	"Jon & Kate"	March 16, 2016
5	"Edray & Jessica"	March 23, 2016
6	"Carla & Nick"	March 23, 2016
7	"Dan & Matt"	March 30, 2016
8	"Jen & Elana"	March 30, 2016
9	"Caitlyn & Ron"	April 6, 2016
10	"Nuala & Dave"	April 6, 2016
11	"Barry & Jenn"	April 13, 2016
12	"Lynne & Heather"	April 13, 2016
13	"Alex & Casey"	April 20, 2016
14	"Astrid & Sheldon"	April 20, 2016
