= Holmes on Homes =

Canadian television series

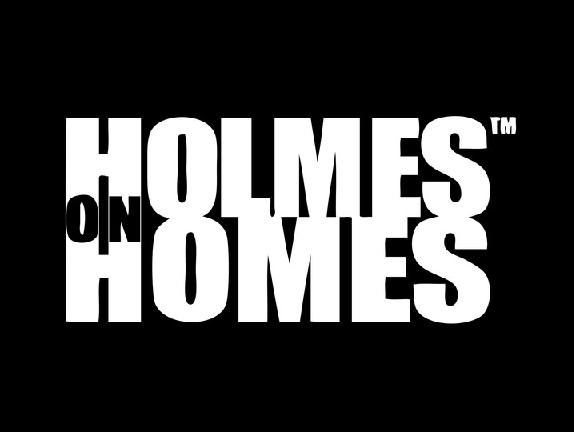
- Starring: Mike Holmes
- Narrated by: Mike Holmes
- Country of origin: Canada
- Original language: English
- No. of episodes: 82

Production
- Running time: 60 min

Original release
- Network: HGTV Canada
- Release: 2003 – 2008

Related
- Holmes Inspection, Holmes Makes It Right

Holmes on Homes is a Canadian television series featuring general contractor Mike Holmes visiting homeowners who are in need of help, mainly due to unsatisfactory home renovations performed by hired contractors.

The series originally aired on Home & Garden Television in Canada, and also on several other Alliance Atlantis networks in Canada (including BBC Canada and Slice), as well as in the United Kingdom, Australia, New Zealand, South Africa and on HGTV in the United States. It had previously aired in the US on Discovery Home until that channel was rebranded Planet Green on 4 June 2008. It was once the highest-rated show on the Canadian HGTV (HGTV having once claimed that an episode had received its highest-ever ratings), with shows airing upwards of 20 times a week at the peak of its popularity. It has won the Gemini viewers' choice award, a testament to the popularity of the show in Canada.

Originally, Holmes on Homes ran as a series of 30-minute episodes (with one one-hour special Whole House Disaster), but moved to a one-hour format midway through the third season due to popular demand. Several longer specials have aired: the one-hour season finale to the first season, Whole House Disaster; the one-hour Holmes for the Holidays at the end of the third season; the two-hour House to Home season finale for the fourth season; the two-hour specials Out of the Ashes and Holmes Inspection in the fifth season; the two-hour sixth-season episode Pasadena 911; and the two-hour Lien on Me in the final season. The latest episode is available for viewing on HGTV's website. The first five seasons of half-hour and hour long episodes, as well as the "Holmes for the Holidays" episode, are also available for purchase on DVD. Season seven commenced airing in Australia on 1 October 2008 on the HOW TO Channel and in the UK on 24 March 2009 on Discovery Shed (formerly Discovery Realtime Extra).

== Premise ==
The show's premise revolves around general contractor Mike Holmes visiting homeowners (initially in the Greater Toronto Area in the earlier seasons, but also to various locales across Canada and the United States, starting with the seventh season) who are in need of help, mainly due to unsatisfactory home renovations performed by hired contractors. A typical episode has homeowners describing their experiences with the previous contractor, including what had caused the original contractor to leave the work incomplete or with substandard work (often under Ontario building codes). Holmes would also go into detail to explain why the work he sees is substandard and needs to be replaced during the repair process. The original contractors are never named on the shows, although an episode of CBC Television's Marketplace has done investigative journalism behind a sixth-season episode and exposed the contractor alleged to have been at fault.

Typically, after beginning the repair work, Holmes and his crew of contractors often find that their small repair project has escalated into a larger one due to surprises that they find and are forced to fix; only on rare occasions has the show's crew not been forced to tear everything down and start over. However, in the end, Holmes presents the homeowners with a completely finished place, often with a few extra surprises.

Throughout the rebuilding process, Holmes often comments on the professionalism of the people hired for the job or lets other contractors talk about how to build things correctly. On some occasions Holmes has vented out his frustrations with previous contractors' substandard work in front of the camera. Particularly for projects involving new homes, Holmes often criticizes the developers for following minimum code and trying to save as many costs as possible.

Several episodes have deviated from this formula: a fourth-season episode explored the issue of mold in the household, and Holmes was brought in to investigate the matter after the homeowner had done some investigative work on their own; a fifth-season episode saw Holmes and crew build a common fence for 52 households, while a sixth-season episode saw Holmes and crew clean up and restore a house that had been rented out, and unknown to the homeowner, turned into a marijuana grow-op. The sixth-season Pasadena 911 two-hour episode also saw Mike and senior contractor Damon Bennett travel to Los Angeles to help out a couple in need after Holmes' own appearance on The Ellen DeGeneres Show.

Because the show is a television series, costs for the homeowners, who are likely to be strapped for cash due to the previous contractors' mistakes and/or frauds, are kept to a minimum (10% to 20% of the cost of repair). Some contractors hired on the show have even donated time, materials, and labor to help homeowners in need. The remainder of the work is funded by the TV production company, but in some cases, Mike Holmes personally contributes funds towards the repairs.

== History ==
Holmes was originally hired on Just Ask Jon Eakes, a home improvement show (also on HGTV and formerly in the US on sister network DIY Network) hosted by Jon Eakes, for some behind-the-scenes work. Mike Holmes approached the show's producers Scott Clark McNeil and Michael Quast with an idea for a new kind of home improvement show. Holmes did not intend that he appear on camera, but the producers made this a condition of the deal. Although submissions to be on the show were initially few and far between, with Holmes doing work on small botched jobs early on in the series, the number of submissions quickly ballooned by the show's fourth season. In its last season, the show was directed by The Holmes Group's Vice President Pete Kettlewell, who had worked on the show from the first season where he did the show's audio, produced by The Holmes Group's Vice President Michael Quast, who had been with the show since the fifth season, and also produced by Mike Holmes himself.

As a result of the show's popularity, Holmes had been able to start up the Holmes Foundation, a charity organization which helps raise awareness of skilled trades.

== Construction crew ==
Although Holmes serves as the show's host, he brings with him several other equally skilled contractors who are regulars on the series (although not all appear in all seasons):

=== Crew ===
The construction crew in the seventh season is as follows:

- Damon Bennett - Damon was introduced (by Shawn) in the fourth season of the series in the episode Window Well to Hell. With the departure of Shawn, Damon became the senior contractor starting in the sixth season. He is also the only series regular other than Mike himself to be part of Pasadena 911. His specialty is carpentry, though he started in bricklaying (having come from a long line of bricklayers) and roofing.
- Adam Belanger - Adam is another senior contractor who joined Mike in the fifth season. His specialty is in landscape and concrete work.
- Corin Ames - Corin, known affectionately as "Pinky", was the first female labourer on the show, starting in the fifth season. She had joined the Holmes Crew as an intern, and was famously hired on-air in her first appearance after finishing her required hours.
- Mike Holmes Jr. - Mike's son has been seen in parts of the first four seasons, and, after graduating from high school some time between the fourth and fifth seasons (his previous appearances having been part of a co-op term in high school), joined the Holmes Crew as a series regular.
- Matt Antonacci - Matt, known affectionately as "Hammy", joined the Holmes Crew for sporadic appearances in the fifth season, and joined full-time in the sixth season.
- Carl Pavlovic - Carl, sometimes known as "Carlito", became a series regular in the sixth season.
- Kate Campbell - Kate is introduced late in the sixth season.
- Peter Lundy - Peter is introduced late in the sixth season.
- Billy Bell - "Uncle Bill", Mike's uncle, is the truck driver for the Holmes tool truck (itself introduced in the fifth season to replace a series of trailers).

=== Former crew ===
The following is a list of past crew members who have appeared in earlier seasons:

- Shawn Morren - Shawn was the site supervisor from the first five seasons of the series. He left after the fifth season. He now has his own company in the Toronto area. Shawn also appeared on episode 208 of Candice Olson's Divine Design. Candice designed the kitchen in his newly purchased home.
- Benjamin Green - Benjamin ("Bengi") was Mike's senior contractor for the first four seasons of the series. Mike and Ben have known each other for much of their careers.
- Desmond Hamlyn - Desmond was another contractor who appeared in the first four seasons of the series.
- Don Carter - Don, a tile specialist, appeared for the first two seasons of the series (the first as a hired specialist), as well as Holmes for the Holidays.
- Micah Morren - Micah, younger brother to Shawn, appears in the fifth season of the series.
- Brennan Cavendish - Brennan briefly appeared in the fifth season of the series.
- Dan Rapa - Dan, a plumber, was introduced in the fourth season as a hired specialist, and became a series regular in the fifth. He has left the series to continue operating his own business.

=== Specialist Subcontractors ===
Several other tradespersons running their own companies also make regular appearances on the series.

- Mike Richter - Plumber, DanMac Plumbing and Drain Service
- Frank Cozzolino - Electrician, Solutions Electrical and Maintenance
- Joe Frangella - Electrician, Solutions Electrical and Maintenance
- Maurizio Randazzo - Electrician, Solutions Electrical and Maintenance
- Craig Lowe - Painter, Lowe Painting
- John Macrae - G.J. Macrae Foundation Repair
- Gary Landry - HVAC Technician, Northwood Heating and Air Conditioning Co. Ltd.
- Sandy Ragno - Electrician, Solo Electric
- Martin Wroblewski - Plumber, Express Rooter Plumbing
- Tony Banwell - Plumber, Tony Banwell Plumbing
- Harvey Bates - Plumber, Westor Plumbing & Heating
- Robert Graves - Roofer, Better Contracting
- Saul Cordova - Cordova Taping

Home renovation expert Jon Eakes has also appeared as a guest in one episode, and the winners of Handyman Superstar Challenge are invited to make a guest appearance on the show (Jordan MacNab in season 6 and Kevin Howe in season 7).

== List of episodes ==
=== Season 1 ===
No. overall	No. in season	Title	Original release date
30-minute episodes
1	1	"Additional Grief"	March 24, 2003
After an expensive kitchen addition and back deck fails to pass city inspection, Mike Holmes steps in and does the job that the previous contractor couldn't.
2	2	"Soggy Sorority"	March 31, 2003
The roof of the Alpha Omicron Pi sorority house near the University of Toronto had been leaking for a long time, so Mike Holmes picks up where many contractors had failed before him. He supervises an all-new flat roof installation, builds a new rooftop deck and learns about sorority life in the process.
3	3	"Botched Basement"	April 7, 2003
After a renovation to lower a basement floor goes bad and the contractor skips town, Mike Holmes makes it right by installing an interior weeping tile system and bringing in an electrician to fix a dangerous electrical panel and electrical wiring.
4	4	"Attica! Attica"	April 14, 2003
4	4	"Crappy Capping"	April 14, 2003
In part one, Mike Holmes repairs an attic with water damage in a new housing development. In part two, Mike helps finish a shoddy window job by installing proper insulation and capping. Fellow HGTV Canada host Jon Eakes appears in the first part to assist Mike and provide context for the homeowners.
5	5	"Cold Comfort"	April 21, 2003
After a contractor failed to properly insulate a new addition, a bedroom became cold and unlivable in winter. With a court case pending, Mike Holmes tears open the ceiling, insulates properly and finds numerous other problems that need fixing.
6	6	"Flimsy Floor"	April 26, 2003
When a brand new kitchen addition floor buckles during a party, a "quick-fix" by the contractor fails to solve the problem. Mike Holmes secures the floor's joists, adds braces and reminds us that structure is just as important as design.
7	7	"Kitchen Catastrophe"	May 3, 2003
When a shady contractor guts a family's kitchen and then stalls for six months with numerous lame excuses, Mike Holmes steps in to mediate and gives the home owners a brand new kitchen in just one week.
8	8	"Window Pain"	May 10, 2003
After four contractors try and fail to fix three very leaky windows, Mike Holmes is called in to fix the leaks once and for all. He restructures the roof and properly installs new windows and an eaves trough.
9	9	"Faulty Showers"	May 17, 2003
A couple paid top dollar to have their kitchen and two bathrooms renovated, but the tiles began to crack and fall apart just one year later. Mike Holmes starts from scratch by tearing out the bathroom and finds a very dangerous surprise.
10	10	"Tiles and Tribulations"	May 24, 2003
A couple bought a recycled wood-product tile for their kitchen, but after just one week, the tiles began to bow and the grout started to crack. After numerous arguments with the installer, Mike Holmes is called in to install a proper porcelain tile floor.
11	11	"Site Unseen"	May 31, 2003
When Mike Holmes arrives to investigate a leak, he discovers that the two-story addition is sitting on a dirt foundation and is in serious danger of collapsing. Mike quickly secures the structure and pours a proper concrete foundation, saving the house.
12	12	"Sweet Home Abandoned"	June 7, 2003
With a dream home two-thirds complete, a family was abandoned by their contractor and is forced to live in a motor home on their front driveway. Mike Holmes supervises the house to completion and moves the family back into their beautifully finished home.
60-minute special episodes
13	13	"Whole House Disaster"	June 15, 2003
In the original pilot to the series, Mike Holmes and his team save a couple from losing their family home, which had been ravaged by a crooked contractor.

=== Season 2 ===
No. overall	No. in season	Title	Original release date
30-minute episodes
14	1	"Terrible Terrace"	February 8, 2004
After a couple with a leaky terrace fought their home builder for two years without any avail, they called Mike Holmes to fix it once and for all. Mike demolishes the existing terrace and rebuilds it with a water tight membrane and new decking.
15	2	"Drafty Ducting"	January 18, 2004
In a brand new townhouse, Mike Holmes is called in to fix a ducting problem that the builder wouldn't. Mike makes things right by busting open the walls, resealing the exposed joints and increasing the size of the main duct line.
16	3	"Ramp Revamp"	February 15, 2004
A couple hired a contractor to build a wheelchair accessible ramp, but the ramp was dangerous and not to code. Mike Holmes arrives on site and rebuilds the ramp — the way it should have been done in the first place.
17	4	"Flooded Foundation"	January 5, 2004
After a young couple tries to fix their leaky foundation numerous times, Mike Holmes excavates the foundation and supervises the installation of a new rubber membrane — fixing the leak once and for all.
18	5	"Garage Grievance"	January 11, 2004
Mike Holmes is called in to replace a brand new garage that was poorly built. Armed with new architectural plans, Mike and his team build a brand new studio garage from the foundation up.
19	6	"Lamin-ain't"	January 25, 2004
When a contractor improperly installs laminate flooring in a basement, a homeowner is left with an unusable space and an empty wallet. Mike Holmes steps in, tears up the floor and properly installs tile and carpet in its place.
20	7	"Roof Goof"	February 22, 2004
After struggling with leak after leak, a couple calls in Mike Holmes and his team to fix a poorly done flat roof. Mike and his guys tear it off and start from scratch.
21	8	"Floor Fiasco"	March 21, 2004
Mike Holmes and his crew tear up a sloppily done front foyer floor and replace it with beautiful granite. This episode marks the debut of Mike's son, Mike Jr., who was brought on-site as part of "take your children to work day" activities during the events of this episode.
22	9	"Doozy Jacuzzi"	April 4, 2004
After a family gets a new bathtub installed in their basement that doesn't work, Mike Holmes arrives on site and quickly discovers the entire basement is a dangerous rat's nest of shoddy electrical work. Mike guts the entire basement to make sure the job is done right.
23	10	"Jacking the Box"	April 25, 2004
A homeowner hired a contractor to pour a new foundation under her house, but the wall was too small for the size of the house and the job was left unfinished. Mike Holmes arrives to shore up the owner's house and give her a safe, warm basement.
24	11	"Access Denied"	April 18, 2004
A couple hired a contractor to build a wheelchair-accessible addition for their six-year-old son with cerebral palsy, but it was riddled with errors. Mike Holmes arrives on site and revamps the 260-square-foot (24 m2) addition from top to bottom.
25	12	"No Grout About It"	April 11, 2004
When a couple's tiles start to loosen and crack in their new home, Mike Holmes is called in and fixes the problem by reinforcing the floor joists and laying a brand new style of floor with a rock hard finish.
26	13	"Hell's Kitchen"	May 2, 2004
After a conflict with a contractor, a family was left with an unusable, barren kitchen for five months. Mike Holmes and his crew undo the small amount of work that the contractor had done, and build a beautiful, functional kitchen.
60-minute special episodes
-	-	"Holmes for the Holidays"	December 23, 2004
In this one-hour Christmas special, Mike Holmes comes to the aid of a family — swindled by a contractor and left to live in their basement underneath a gutted, unstable home. Mike and his crew undertake the enormous task of finishing the whole house renovation in time for Christmas. This episode (not to be confused with the later Holmes Family Rescue episode of the same name, which was also a Christmas special) was filmed during the second production season (and included on the season 2 DVD set), but is considered as part of the third broadcast season, although it is not included in HGTV's rotation due to it being a Christmas special.

=== Season 3 ===
The third season saw a move from a 30-minute format to a full-hour format partway through the season.

No. overall	No. in season	Title	Original release date
30-minute episodes
27	1	"Shower Stalled"	July 14, 2004
What should have been a basic bathroom enlargement snowballs into disaster for a young couple seeking to spruce up their mid-century home. Mike explains the importance of obtaining permits before any home renovation projects (they protect the home owner, not the contractor) and why no one should just build over top of old fixtures.
28	2	"Cabinet Chaos"	July 21, 2004
A "professional" cabinet and kitchen company does a very unprofessional job on a couple's home. Not only that, due to improper safety measures on the site, the couple's son is poisoned (he survives). They enlist Mike to testify in court on their behalf as well as salvage their wreck of a kitchen.
29	3	"Cold Feet"	July 28, 2004
New home construction with improper vapor barrier between the garage and the bedroom above. The team uses spray-foam as insulation.
30	4	"Exit Wound"	August 4, 2004
A walk-up stairwell is oozing water and has a dangerous tilt to it. Mike digs up the whole thing only to discover that while the brickwork is beautiful, it isn't up to code.
32	6	"All Decked Out"	August 11, 2004
A "power of sale" house proves to be more than a homeowner bargained for, inheriting a mess of an addition that the previous owner built without a permit. Mike volunteers to replace a rotted, poorly built double-deck and also finds an architect and contractor to fix the rest of the errors inside the house.
33	7	"Step by Step"	September 8, 2004
After a contractor poorly builds a staircase in their home, a couple turns to Mike who removes the old work and builds a new staircase.
34	8	"Wall of Shame"	September 15, 2004
Mike and a team of masons replace a wobbly stone wall and flimsy fence with beautiful new cobblestone.
39	13	"Smoke and Mirrors"	August 18, 2004
A poorly installed wood fireplace creates consternation for a family. The Make It Right crew lend a hand in airing out the situation.
60-minute episodes
31	5	"Semi Dilemma"	November 4, 2004
Two families sharing a 110-year-old Victorian townhouse are experiencing issues with sagging front porches and drippy rain spouts. Mike and co. replace the rotting wood and repair the roof and drains, ultimately performing more of a restoration than a renovation.
35	9	"Drain Disdain"	October 7, 2004
A botched attempt at adding a basement shower and a weight room leave a home owner incensed. Mike steps in to correct the last contractor's well-meaning, yet amateur, efforts.
36	10	"Wash & Weep"	October 28, 2004
An improperly installed laundry room has the washing machine cleaning the kitchen floor instead of the dirty clothes. Mike unravels a plumbing tangle and also addresses some areas that the first two contractors ignored.
37	11	"Twice Bitten"	October 14, 2004
New parents try to put an addition on their mid-century home to create a nursery for their daughter. After going through two shifty contractors and a lot of grief, they call in Mike to clean up the mess left by careless con artists.
38	12	"Honeymoon Ensuite"	October 21, 2004
A newlywed couple purchases a freshly remodeled home with a top-notch bathroom. However, some alarming cracks in the wall, ceiling, and bathroom tile begin to appear. The inspector deems these 'cosmetic', but it takes Mike and his crew to uncover the shoddy workmanship beneath a thousand-dollar finish. They find shoddy plumbing and electrical work as well as old knob and tube wiring.

=== Season 4 ===
No. overall	No. in season	Title	Original release date
40	1	"Two Steps Back"	January 20, 2005
A couple have their front steps rebuild by Mike. Originally these were installed by scamming contractors that did a really poor job. Mike rebuild these from the foundation up, and fixes other issues in the house.
41	2	"Window Well to Hell"	January 27, 2005
Homeowner hired contractor to finish basement and install larger windows to make a living space for her daughter and grandchildren. After reaching the end of her rope and running out of money she fired the contractor. When she noticed the window wells filling with water she called Mike. Along with no provision for drainage he noticed that they had not installed proper lintels above the window to support the brick. Once inside he noticed signs of poor workmanship in the basement finishing. Pulling some drywall for further inspection found improper construction, insulation, electrical and plumbing. Mike tore it all down and rebuilt the basement, plus corrected the windows. This episode also marks the introduction of longtime Holmes Crew member Damon Bennett.
42	3	"Bungled Bungalow"	January 1, 2005
A couple purchases a charming 1930s era cottage in which to enjoy their golden years. Sadly, their attempts at renovating it leave them with empty wallets and a half-finished interior. Mike and his crew step in and unify what turns out to be about four different additions from various decades.
43	4	"Kitchen Coleslaw"	January 6, 2005
A first-time home owner wants to update the kitchen in his 120-year-old Victorian townhouse. When the contractor cuts and runs leaving a gutted downstairs and a hazardous mess of plumbing and wiring, Mike and co. end up tearing out the floor as well as the walls to make it right.
44	5	"Bar None"	January 13, 2005
A young couple want to add a bar and entertainment area to their finished basement. In a refreshing turn for the unusual, Mike deems the previous contractor's work "not bad" if only about 40% complete. With fewer headaches than usual to deal with, Mike and the crew put extra care into creating the perfect pub.
45	6	"A River Ran Through It"	February 10, 2005
Homeowners attempt to solve the problem of their mid-century home's leaky roof by adding a second story addition. However, the contractor does little to fix the lingering damage from the roof leaks and eventually skips out with the work only half-finished. Mike and the crew assist in correcting old mistakes and finishing the work left undone.
46	7	"Best Laid Plans"	February 17, 2005
A wooden kitchen floor was replaced several times due to water damage. Mike calls in several experts to determine the source.
47	8	"Sunny Side Down"	March 10, 2005
After a homeowner mistakenly hires an inexperienced designer-contractor to renovate a sunroom and bathroom, a leak left in the roof results in her grandson slipping and getting hurt badly. Enraged at the accident and how poorly the job was going, she fires the contractor and calls in Mike Holmes to make things right. The lesson? An interior designer is not a renovator.
48	9	"This Mould House"	March 17, 2005
A young family is plagued with coughs and colds as well as leaks due to improperly installed windows. Mike stresses the dangers of indoor mould, the importance of filter masks, and when to seek out a professional.
49	10	"Hullaba Loo"	March 24, 2005
A woman hires a bathroom specialist company to renovate her bathroom. She finds the work is sub-standard and, when she withholds final payment pending completion of the work, the company sues her for the balance.
50	11	"Unfinished Business"	March 31, 2005
A family acts as their own contractor in order to build a second floor addition to their house. Everything goes well until they hire the final contractor to do the insulation and finishing work.
51	12	"House to Home"	April 14, 2005
52	13	"House to Home"	April 21, 2005
After re-mortgaging their home to add a wheelchair accessible addition for their disabled son, a couple is confronted with improper work and a crumbling foundation. Mike Holmes comes to the aid of a family in dire straits and begins one of the toughest and biggest jobs of his contracting career.

=== Season 5 ===
The fifth season saw an overall change in look, due to increased production values (the filming crew, unlike the first four seasons, were equipped with widescreen high-definition cameras, although the show continues to air in standard-definition on HGTV). The season also saw the Holmes crew expand from a few experienced contractors to encompassing younger apprentices as well.

No. overall	No. in series	Title	Original release date
53	1	"O-Fence-Ive"	November 17, 2005
A fencing contractor rips off 52 families in a new housing development. Mike and crew bring the neighborhood together. This episode is considered to be the full-time debut of Mike's son, Mike Jr., as a member of the Holmes Crew, after sporadically appearing in select previous episodes.
54	2	"House Arrest"	November 10, 2005
A planned 3-month renovation becomes a year-and-a-half nightmare. Mike and crew come to the rescue, take all the shoddy plumbing out, and do it over again from scratch. This episode is considered to be the debut of Corin "Pinky" Ames, the first female member of the Holmes Crew, despite appearing and being credited in the previous episode.
55	3	"Falling Flat"	December 1, 2005
A photographer's backyard studio is plagued with a leaking flat roof after a prolonged build.
56	4	"Ceiling the Deal"	March 2, 2006
Mike arrives to investigate a job by web-based "basement specialists" who claimed to work for him. During the inspection, with one hand he pulls down a 150-pound ceiling bulkhead secured with a few screws. The team gut, redesign and build a whole new multi-purpose basement.
57	5	"Bargain Basement"	December 22, 2005
Mike arrives to discover major flaws in a shoddy basement renovation and hidden junction boxes, tear it all out, and make it right.
58	6	"For Annie"	February 9, 2006
The Holmes Crew arrive to finish a renovation intended for their now-deceased daughter.
59	7	"Out of the Ashes"	March 9, 2006
60	8	"Out of the Ashes"	March 16, 2006
A previous contractor hired by the homeowners insurance company to repair the home after an electrical fire leaves behind incomplete and substandard work. Mike and crew arrive and, after completely gutting the home, find they must remove asbestos insulation from the basement and do a full toxic-waste remediation caused by leakage from a heating-oil tank left buried in the back yard.
61	9	"Taking a Bath"	April 6, 2006
The Holmes crew investigates why a pair of homeowners had their bathtubs in their bathrooms replaced three times in quick succession, causing a large mould buildup.
62	10	"Showing the Cracks"	October 5, 2006
The elderly homeowner called in a trusted contractor to lay a new ceramic tile floor. When the tiles start cracking down the middle in straight lines, Mike and the crew strip it down to the sub-floor and build a new kitchen 'from the ground up'.
63	11	"What a Mesh"	October 12, 2006
The contractor's initial work was up to standard, although using old methods. However, the task of tiling the entire ground floor overwhelmed him, and the standard deteriorated until he quit. Mike is impressed with the tile company (and their delivery vehicle) when they invite him to redo the whole job with products they offer to donate, if he applies them using the correct methods.
64	12	"Wall of Sound"	October 19, 2006
The Holmes crew investigates why the homeowners could hear their neighbors from across the common wall of a new semi-detached house. It's discovered that there was a walkway in that shared wall, initially for construction purposes only, which was improperly sealed off and would have been a major fire hazard. Mike also discovers that the insulation in the garage is improperly installed.
65	13	"Holmes Inspection"	October 26, 2006
66	14	"Holmes Inspection"	November 2, 2006
Homeowners learn the value of doing your homework and verifying the credentials of a home inspector. Having been told that their 1940s-era home was "fine" in all respects, they move in only to encounter problem after problem. Mike spots nearly all the glaringly obvious issues immediately and brings in his crew to fix what turns into a gigantic electrical/plumbing/HVAC nightmare created by previous attempts at renovation. Among other things, the crew discovers tree roots in the clay basement pipes, a washroom and laundry room full of mould, sewer gas in the basement, thousands of carpenter ants, 40 hidden junction boxes in the basement, and a small electrical fire in a junction box that fortunately burned itself out without igniting anything else. One interesting surprise is the discovery of an old and extremely well-constructed dry well buried in the front yard.

=== Season 6 ===
No. overall	No. in season	Title	Original release date
67	1	"Shaky Foundation"	November 9, 2006
In the sixth season debut, Mike and crew arrive at a new home at which the homeowners had discovered that the foundation concrete was woefully weak — as little as one-third of the minimum code requirement — and which had slipped past the building inspectors, who had only compared the weak foundation wall concrete to that of the foundation floor (without considering that the floor may have also been weak).
68	2	"Let's Rejoist"	November 16, 2006
Mike comes to the assistance of a homeowner who had discovered a small water stain in their ceiling below an upstairs balcony. After the homeowner hired a roofer to investigate, the roofer discovered that the joists holding the balcony up had completely rotted through, and was forced to abort any attempt at a roof repair. Finding no other local contractors willing to undertake the challenge of replacing these joists in addition to fixing the original problem, Mike and his crew step up to the plate and make things right. Jordan MacNab, winner of the first Handyman Superstar Challenge, makes an appearance as a guest crew member.
69	3	"Completely Incomplete"	November 23, 2006
Mike Holmes arrives to a second-story addition that was claimed by the original contractor to be "99% complete", and had liened the property when the homeowners refused to pay in full before the project was complete. However, what he discovers is that the "99% complete" assertion was more like a 99% fabrication.
70	4	"Stone Walled"	January 4, 2007
Mike Holmes arrives to a home in which the homeowners had removed a retaining wall in their backyard because it needed replacement. Unfortunately, the original contractor had left much of the material ordered unused, and had done a subpar job in building the new wall from cinderblocks meant for the foundation of a house — which was completely inappropriate given the size of the wall needed. As the original contractor stopped showing up at the home and became difficult to reach, the concerned homeowners even inquired as to whether the contractor had been injured at another site, and only realized that they had been victimized when a bill for the unused material had shown up at their door.
71	5	"Lack of Truss"	May 31, 2007
In this episode, which was also featured on Marketplace six months before it first aired, Mike and his crew visit homeowners who had asked for an additional bedroom, and were convinced by the original contractor that it could be done within the space of their attic. Yet, to do so, the original contractor had removed much of the structural support in the attic, forcing Mike and crew to remove the roof entirely to rebuild the bedroom, raising the height of the house in the process.
72	6	"Gone to Pot"	May 3, 2007
Mike Holmes comes to the aid of a homeowner who had rented out a house to tenants — only for the Ontario Provincial Police to inform her that her house had been transformed into a marijuana grow-op. Mike enters the picture after the police had left, and is faced with restoring the damage done to the home largely due to indoor mold but also due to the grower's modifications. The work requires replacing most drywall, most electrical, the kitchen and three bathrooms to turn it back into a comfortable living space again.
73	7	"Pasadena 911"	May 17, 2007
74	8	"Pasadena 911"	May 24, 2007
Mike Holmes, after appearing on The Ellen DeGeneres Show, learns of the plight of two homeowners whose "dream house" renovation had gone horribly wrong (having spent 90% of their money but only having 30% of the work done before the original contractor had apparently abandoned the job) and travels to Pasadena, California to make it right. The renovation effort is spearheaded by Los Angeles-area general contractor James Cowan and foreman Christopher Chico instead of the regular crew (who were in the process of filming the remaining episodes of the season), and only Holmes and senior contractor Damon Bennett (both of whom had to fly regularly between Toronto and Los Angeles) from the regular crew appear in this episode. Even though Mike Holmes and Damon Bennett were the only regular crew members to appear in this episode, one of his subtrades, Craig Lowe, the painter who has known and worked with Mike for a long time, he happened to be on vacation and came in to help paint the house. He was the only subtrade that Mike knew who appeared in this episode.
75	9	"Third Time Lucky"	November 29, 2007
Mike and crew visit the home of a wheelchair-using woman, who had been living without a bathroom in her apartment for the better part of two years. The homeowner had hired two previous contractors — the first was dismissed because of a lack of skill, the second because communications had broken down. The Holmes crew not only try to make her now-gutted bathroom wheelchair-accessible, but also, after seeing the various injuries she had from bumping around on her wheelchair in her apartment, attempted to remodel the rest of her apartment for wheelchair accessibility.
76	10	"Country Kitchen"	November 15, 2007
Mike and crew arrive at a 25-year-old townhouse, where the homeowners had undertaken a kitchen renovation, but ended up with a very small and virtually unusable kitchen. Country singer Charlie Major, a family friend of the homeowners, guest stars; his 2008 single, "Make it Right", is performed at the end of the episode.
77	11	"Clean Slate"	October 11, 2007
Mike and crew arrive at a century-old house whose bathroom had recently undergone an expensive renovation (complete with slate tiles), but had problems with water seeping through the grout and the fact that the shower did not drain properly. Upon taking the bathroom apart, he discovers the extent of the damage: leaking water had pooled two inches deep under the shower.
78	12	"Frozen Assets"	October 25, 2007
Mike and crew arrive at a new home development that has been plagued with heating and plumbing issues caused by faulty design, leading to the front porch collapsing. They discover that (design issues aside) while the builders had tried to make the home safe and livable, several glaring mistakes had ultimately caused these problems.
79	13	"Due Date"	October 18, 2007
Mike and crew help out a family whose basement renovation (the first step in a long line of house remodeling jobs) was carefully planned around expecting the birth of a child, but had been delayed by the original contractor for almost a year. With the basement nowhere near completion despite a massive cost overrun and in the middle of a time crunch (due to the baby), the homeowners turn to Mike to help them complete their basement.

=== Season 7 ===
During the seventh season, Mike travels across Canada to help homeowners in other parts of the country, although a number remain within Ontario. Season seven is also notable for the formation of The Holmes Foundation, a charity organization affiliated with the show that promotes awareness of skilled trades (both to homeowners looking to hire them for renovations and to youth as a career choice), and its first project, the episode "Lien on Me".

No. overall	No. in series	Title	Original release date
60-minute episodes
80	1	"Hit the Deck"	October 4, 2007
Mike and crew travel to Saint John, New Brunswick, to help a homeowner whose second-story deck had recently collapsed, injuring the homeowner and several friends. Mike discovers the problem behind the collapse, and builds a replacement for the homeowner. Kevin Howe, winner of the second Handyman Superstar Challenge, makes an appearance in this episode as a guest crew member.
81	2	"Rocky Reno"	November 1, 2007
The Holmes crew travel to Canmore, Alberta, to fix a front porch and entranceway that was part of an addition. The homeowners became wary of the original contractor after their product started to substantially differ from the plans, and the contractor demanded the completion payment well before the job was complete.
82	3	"Paradise Island"	November 22, 2007
Mike comes to the aid of a homeowner who had a serious injury in her cottage on Paradise Island, Ontario (near Peterborough, Ontario), prompting the need of a bathroom renovation with shower bars to help her move in and out of her shower. However, the original contractor, though meaning well, had also taken the opportunity to treat the job as if it were a vacation, taking a month to do a four-day job, while leaving serious water issues untouched. Mike comes to the rescue by helping her relocate a hot water heater originally in the exterior of the cottage, while redoing the bathroom and the entrance ramp, as he discovers that the rails are installed on the wrong side (and the more dangerous side remains exposed) - all while noting that, because of their location on an island, any missing supplies will take 30 minutes to recover from their truck at shore, and a trip to the store could take up to three hours.
83	4	"Re-Inventing"	April 17, 2008
The Holmes Crew inspects a house that has had intermittent heating issues in the six years since it was built, yet had gone unaddressed by the builder or Ontario's New Home Warranty Program (due to a series of bureaucratic issues and "band-aid" remedies). The problem was discovered to have been caused in part by alterations to the design of the house having been done without necessary matching alterations to the HVAC system, thus forcing Holmes and his crew to completely replace the HVAC, hot water, and electrical systems.
84	5	"Brick-A-Brack"	April 3, 2008
When Mike seemingly comes on the job for exterior work only (later found to have been caused by a humidifier which had been running continuously), they discover that the homeowners' possessions, which were piled from floor to ceiling, are preventing them from doing a full basement inspection. The Holmes crew not only repairs the exterior issue, but also helps the homeowners to sort and throw out their unnecessary possessions.
85	6	"Blind Faith"	May 22, 2008
After winning a $15,000 bathroom renovation from a church auction, the homeowners discover that the contractor behind the renovation prize had spent another $15,000 with only a rough-in to show for the $30,000 worth of work. The Holmes Crew arrives to fix the bathroom.
86	7	"Behind the Scenes"	April 24, 2008
In this special episode, the Holmes crew (both construction and production) reveal the behind the scenes work during the filming from the seventh season, including the process from viewer submission to filming, how three or four episodes are produced at the same time, and the logistical issues with having a camera crew and a construction crew trying to work over each other. The episode includes behind-the-scenes footage from "Additional Grief", "Country Kitchen", "Paradise Island", "Lien on Me", and an upcoming episode titled "Blind Faith", as well as a Maxwell House commercial and Mike's interview on 20/20. It also explores the origins of the series and how the Holmes Foundation was founded, as well as providing some insight into the Holmes family (all three of Mike's children work on the show in some capacity - eldest daughter Amanda in an administrative and public relations role, middle child Sherry as a production assistant, and youngest child Mike Jr. on the Holmes Crew).
87	8	"Kitchen Knockout"	May 15, 2008
George Chuvalo, former heavyweight boxer, finds himself the victim of a disreputable contractor. When the situation was brought to Mike Holmes' attention, he felt honored to help out his boyhood hero.
88	9	"Pane in the Glass"	June 5, 2008
The homeowners call in the Holmes Crew to fix a bay window. The original contractor's work, involving replacing a regular window with a bay window without supporting structure, were captured on tape by a neighbor's home security system cameras.
89	10	"Gut Ache"	July 3, 2008
The Holmes Crew arrive to help a homeowner with a kitchen renovation — the previous renovators had specialized in finishing work (such as cabinets), but had not addressed any of the underlying problems at all.
90	11	"A Different Slant"	July 10, 2008
The Holmes Crew address a couple who every year has snow accumulating in their attic — so much that they are forced to shovel it all into plastic bags.
91	12	"Rock Bottom"	July 17, 2008
The Holmes Crew address a custom-built home, whose brand-new components are beginning to show signs of deterioration. Footage from this episode was also featured on Marketplace in 2009, where two other homes built by the same builder were investigated. Ice hockey commentator Don Cherry, a relative of the homeowners, makes a guest appearance in this episode.
92	13	"Capital Offence"	July 24, 2008
The Holmes Crew travel to Ottawa, Ontario to help two of the show's biggest fans, who, despite having heeded Mike's advice and researched meticulously, nevertheless find that their bathroom renovation has gone awry.
120-minute special episodes
-	-	"Lien on Me"	April 10, 2008
In this two-hour special episode, Mike deals with a couple who had a "friend" do an addition. Although the work was originally estimated to cost just over $200,000, the "friend" later put a lien on the house for more than $500,000 and took the owners of the house to court. Mike and the crew take the house down brick by brick and stud by stud to save the family from shoddy work done under the previous contract, then design an eco-friendly home and construct it on the site. This episode is notable for employing over 100 companies and 30 months of construction work (demolition having started sometime in Season 5, and construction during Season 6) - to date the most extensive work on any Holmes show, in terms of materials, manpower, and time.

=== Best of Holmes on Homes ===
Best of Holmes on Homes is a 2012 remix TV series featuring clips from seasons 5-7 of Holmes on Homes and Holmes in New Orleans, brought together by a common theme, to illustrate home problems. Mike Holmes narrates the show.

No.	Title	Original release date
1	"Kitchen En-Counters"	April 22, 2012
Mike takes a look at kitchen renovations.: "Kitchen Knockout" - The structural repairs needed to enable an open plan kitchen worthy of Mike's childhood hero is highlighted.; "What a Mesh" - The demolition of poorly-installed floor tiles across the entire length of the house is highlighted.; "Gut Ache" - The previous contractor refusing to gut the kitchen of an old home, as requested by the homeowner, and the dangerous patch work that were hidden as a result are highlighted.; "Third Time Lucky" - The challenges of remodelling the kitchen of a condo for accessibility is highlighted.; "Country Kitchen" - The consequences of an inadequate kitchen design resulting in non-functional kitchen appliances is highlighted.; "Showing the Cracks" - The need to have a properly installed floor before cabinets are installed is highlighted.; The episode closes with the credits sequence from "Showing the Cracks".
2	"Great Pretenders"	April 29, 2012
Mike takes a look at jobs where the original contractor is believed to have been incapable of completing the renovation as promised.: "Bargain Basement" - The shoddy workmanship of the original contractor, and the attempt by that contractor to fraudulently activate and use the homeowners' credit cards and other possessions, alongside the attempt to destroy any documentation of the agreed-upon work to be done, was highlighted. Additionally, during the demolition, a note stating that it was the original contractor's first ever basement renovation was discovered.; "Pane in the Glass" - Surveillance video footage from a neighbor showing the original contractor's inability to properly install a bay window is highlighted.; "What a Mesh" - The effort of a tile supplier, having seen their tiles installed incorrectly by the original contractor, to help the homeowners in need, including contacting Mike on their behalf and donating all the tiles and the services of the installers needed for the reconstruction effort, is highlighted.; "Shaky Foundation" - The effort of the original home builder and Ontario's new home warranty program to absolve responsibility for the faults with the foundation by misinterpreting a Schmidt hammer test is highlighted.; "Blind Faith" - The efforts of the original contractor to bill the homeowners multiple times for the same incomplete work is highlighted.; "Lien on Me" - The efforts of the original contractor to defend their workmanship and justify the lien on the property that was greater than the value of the agreed-upon contract, only to have their own engineers showing that the quality of the work done was worse than that being claimed by engineers hired by the Holmes Crew, was highlighted.
3	"Hidden Dangers"	May 6, 2012
Mike takes a look at jobs where abatement processes, such as asbestos abatement, were required.: "Gone to Pot" - The mould abatement process, and the subsequent discovery of asbestos that also needed to be removed, is highlighted.; "Holmes Inspection" - The cleanup of surface mold and subsequent discovery of carpenter ants within a disused bathroom is highlighted.; "Kitchen Knockout" - The removal of an aging heating oil tank that is on the verge of rupture is highlighted.; "Brick-A-Brack" - The removal of the mould-infested and rotten brick and wood beneath the windows, and the windows themselves, is highlighted.; "Out of the Ashes" - The removal of raccoons who had taken up residence in the abandoned home, as well as the process to remove smoke damage, asbestos, and a buried disused oil tank from the home, is highlighted.; The episode closes with the credits sequence from "Brick-A-Brack".
4	"Wreck Rooms"	May 13, 2012
Mike takes a look at basement renovations.: "Ceiling the Deal" - The dangers of contractors misrepresenting their work is highlighted. The homeowners being made aware of the deficiencies in the original contractor's work by drywall installers is also highlighted.; "House Arrest" - The importance of a properly structured basement to support the upper floors of an addition is highlighted.; "Bargain Basement" - The importance of attention to detail in the finishes of the basement is highlighted.; "Holmes Inspection" - The poor construction of the existing basement, with plumbing, electrical, structural, and mechanical issues, on top of a carpenter ant infestation, is highlighted. The process of Mike guiding crew chief Damon Bennett in designing his first-ever basement is also highlighted.; "For Annie" - The process of underpinning an improperly built foundation wall to support an addition is highlighted.; "Due Date" - The importance of workmanship in the basement renovation, especially behind the walls and into the foundation, is highlighted.
5	"Super Structures"	May 20, 2012
Mike takes a look at jobs where major restructuring of the home is performed.: "Lien On Me" - The effort to tear down the home and build the replacement home in its place from the ground up is highlighted.; "Pasadena 911" - The effort to build earthquake-resistant homes suitable for southern California is highlighted.; "Lack of Truss" - The effort to convert an attic space into a proper addition by raising the roof of the house and repairing compromised roof trusses is highlighted. An ultimately misguided effort by the Holmes Crew to install the new roof while Mike is away on the "Pasadena 911" jobsite was also shown, only for them to disassemble it due to the slope of the roof being too low and not according to the approved plans.; "Out of the Ashes" - The effort to restructure the old home to accommodate the settling foundation and make it meet modern building codes is highlighted.; "Hit the Deck" - The effort to rebuild the second-storey deck after the original deck collapsed, and have it be properly supported from below, is highlighted.; Holmes in New Orleans - The effort to build a home in New Orleans that can withstand the worst hurricanes and will resist being washed away in the event of a levee failure is highlighted.; The episode closes with additional footage from Holmes in New Orleans.
6	"Shockingly Bad"	May 27, 2012
Mike takes a look at jobs where major electrical deficiencies are discovered.: "Holmes Inspection" - The discovery of 40 hidden junction boxes in the basement of the home, necessitating a complete rewire of the home, is highlighted.; "Bargain Basement" - The discovery of hidden junction boxes, overloaded circuits, and fixtures connected behind walls using extension cords, all installed by an inexperienced crew, is highlighted.; "Gone to Pot" - The work needed to repair electrical lines illegally tapped from the public utility (Toronto Hydro) to facilitate an illegal marijuana grow-op, and the dangerous mix of aluminium and copper wiring present in the house, is highlighted.; "Gut Ache" - The original contractor not respecting the homeowner's wishes to gut their kitchen to fix potential electrical issues, including hidden open-air electrical connections and electrical fixtures with spliced power cables, is highlighted.; Holmes in New Orleans - The installation of solar panels in homes being rebuilt in the Lower Ninth Ward of New Orleans is highlighted.; "Paradise Island" - The installation of LED solar lights that illuminate the ramp leading to the homeowner's home from their dock at night is highlighted.; "Lack of Truss" - The risks of performing electrical work without a permit, and how it may enable unqualified laborers free rein to endanger homeowners, is highlighted. In this case, almost all of the electrical work was spliced from existing lines, and most of the lighting installed in the attic was done with retrofit fixtures unsuited for being installed in attic spaces.; The episode closes with the credits sequence from "Gut Ache", where Mike takes the entire Holmes Crew out in a single truck from the job site, only to accidentally leave Mike Jr. behind.
7	"Down the Drain"	June 3, 2012
Mike takes a look at jobs where major plumbing deficiencies are discovered.: "Frozen Assets" - The improper placement of water pipes and the improper installation of spray foam, leading to pipes freezing and bursting, is highlighted.; "Holmes Inspection" - The improper plumbing that has led to raw sewage being discharged inside their basement, and the discovery of tree roots compromising the clay pipes under the foundation, is highlighted.; "Bargain Basement" - The improper installation of the plumbing fixtures, including burying cleanouts behind drywall, a plumbing system with two interconnected traps, and the installation of pipes by compromising structural integrity is highlighted.; "Paradise Island" - The improper installation of a toilet, a hot water heater, and the compromising of structure to install drain pipes is highlighted.; "Pasadena 911" - The lengths needed to replace deteriorated plumbing within the hard ground of the Pasadena foothills with continuously welded plumbing pipe is highlighted.; "Due Date" - The improper securing of pipes against structure, and the replacement of an old clay pipe installation no longer allowed under modern building codes, is highlighted.; The episode closes with the credits sequence from "Paradise Island".
8	"Something Completely Different"	June 10, 2012
Mike takes a look at some of the most unique, unusual, and challenging jobs he has experienced.: Holmes in New Orleans - the technologies used to manage stormwater, and the use of pervious concrete in particular, is highlighted.; "Wall of Sound" - the use of technologies to measure and mitigate sound transmission through a wall is highlighted.; "Brick-A-Brack" - the effort to help the homeowners remove their unneeded possessions, piled from floor to ceiling, is highlighted.; "For Annie" - the effort to use dowsing to locate underground sceptic lines, in preparation for the replacement of the home's sceptic system, is highlighted.; "Holmes Inspection" - the discovery of a buried and abandoned dry well in the property, and a discussion of its historical uses, is highlighted.; "Lien on Me" - the effort to design and build an experimental concept home, free from the problems that plague the jobsites Mike has visited, and the technologies to enable this endeavor, is highlighted.; The episode closes with the credits sequence from "Lien on Me".
9	"Emotional Rescues"	June 17, 2012
Mike takes a look at jobs that have made a large emotional impact on him.: "Out of the Ashes" - the story of the homeowners rebuilding their home after a fire and subsequent deaths in the family is highlighted.; "For Annie" - the story of the homeowners who had remodeled their home for their daughter, who died before the work could be completed, is highlighted.; Holmes in New Orleans - the story of restoring the Lower Ninth Ward of New Orleans, three years after the destruction caused by Hurricane Katrina, is highlighted. Additionally, the story of Rusty Higgins, a first responder who temporarily joined the Holmes Crew for the project, is highlighted.; "Lien on Me" - the story of the homeowners, whose renovation was done so poorly that the entire structure had to be demolished in a rebuilding process lasting 30 months, is highlighted.; "Hit the Deck" - the story of the homeowner and her friends, who were injured when the deck they were on collapsed and fell to the ground, is highlighted.; The episode closes with the credits sequence from "Hit the Deck".
10	"Fiddling on the Roof"	June 24, 2012
Mike takes a look at jobs where major roofing deficiencies are discovered.: "Falling Flat" - The challenges of fixing a leaky flat roof that is pooling in a number of places, amidst bureaucratic red tape relating to the permitting process, is highlighted.; "Out of the Ashes" - The removal and replacement of an inconsistently sheeted and rotting roof, secured with nails intended to secure shingles to the sheeting, is highlighted.; "A Different Slant" - The discovery of snow accumulating in a brand-new attic space caused by the improper installation of roof vents, the repair of two weak points intended for the installation of skylights at a later time, are highlighted. The installation of a new metal roof panels and a ridge vent is also highlighted.; "Let's Rejoist" - The replacement of rotting floor joists, uncovered by a roofing company tasked to replace a roof that was believed to be leaking, is highlighted.; "Rocky Reno" - The removal of a brand new roof due to subpar installation methods despite being a premium product is highlighted.; "Lack of Truss" - The improper conversion of an attic into living space, and the process of replacing it with a proper second storey addition, is highlighted.; The episode closes with the credits sequence from "Lack of Truss".
11	"The Great Outdoors"	August 7, 2012
Mike takes a look at jobs involving exterior work.: "O-Fence-ive" - The effort to rebuild fences for an entire block of 52 homeowners is featured, and how the effort brought the neighborhood together.; "For Annie" - The extensive repairs needed to the exterior foundation and landscaping of the home, made more challenging by inclement weather and the changing of the seasons, is featured; "Pasadena 911" - The challenges of working in Pasadena, California, and the differences between the construction practices of southern California and the Greater Toronto Area, is featured.; "Rock Bottom" - The effort to replace the exterior cladding, and the need to relocate utility lines to fix other issues, is featured.; "Rocky Reno" - The effort to replace exterior weeping drains, waterproof the foundation, and repair retaining walls is featured.; "Stone Walled" - The effort to remove an inadequate retaining wall, and the need to demolish a shed impeding the heavy machinery needed to install of its replacement, is featured.; The episode closes with the credits sequence from "Stone Walled".
12	"The Unflushables"	August 14, 2012
Mike takes a look at bathroom renovations.: "Taking a Bath" - The importance of using the proper products and having them installed properly is highlighted.; "Completely Incomplete" - The importance of having the proper permits to perform the renovation is highlighted.; "Third Time Lucky" - The importance of respecting the needs of the homeowner, in this case, the need to have a bathroom suitable for wheelchair accessibility, is highlighted.; "Clean Slate" - The importance of hiring renovators that are proficient in their area of specialty is highlighted. The need to have bathroom plumbing, in particular drains and venting, be installed properly is highlighted.; "House Arrest" - The importance of having a bathroom with a proper layout, and not fitting bathrooms in areas unsuited for them, is highlighted.; "Capital Offence" - The importance of homeowners knowing the major milestones in a bathroom renovation is highlighted.; The episode closes with the credits sequence from "Completely Incomplete".
13	"All in a Day's Work"	August 21, 2012
Mike takes a look at what Holmes Crew do behind the scenes at various jobsites.: Holmes in New Orleans - the Holmes Crew, working in the New Orleans heat, decide to one day wrestle series construction producer Andrew Wood in the mud, due to his responsibilities allowing him to work in an air-conditioned trailer. Mike's tour through the nearby wetlands is also showcased.; Mike talks about celebrities visiting jobsites; "Rock Bottom" - the guest appearance of ice hockey commentator Don Cherry, a relative of the homeowners, is showcased; "Kitchen Knockout" - the appearance of boxing legend George Chuvalo, the homeowner, is showcased; "Country Kitchen" - the guest appearance of country music artist Charlie Major, a friend of the homeowners, is showcased. Footage from a country music award show where Mike was a guest is also shown. His single "Make it Right", composed in honor of Mike and shown in that episode's credits sequence, is featured.; Footage from various episodes are shown of crew members celebrating their birthdays at jobsites.; "Rocky Reno" - Mike celebrates his birthday at a rock quarry near Canmore, Alberta setting off explosives, as well as being given a horseback ride days later; Holmes in New Orleans - Mike celebrates his birthday in New Orleans, where his birthday celebrations included being part of a parade down Canal Street and Bourbon Street.; A collection of never-before-seen scenes from various episodes and public appearances are shown.; The episode closes with the credits sequence from "Rocky Reno", where the Holmes Crew dress in western wear for a photo shoot.

== See also ==
- Cowboy Trap, a similar series in the UK
- Holmes Inspection

Preceded by none	Mike Holmes series 2003-2008	Succeeded by Holmes in New Orleans
