= HGTV (Canada) =

- Country: Canada
- Broadcast area: Nationwide
- Headquarters: Toronto, Ontario

Programming
- Language: English
- Picture format: 1080i (HDTV); 480i (SDTV)

Ownership
- Owner: Rogers Sports & Media (branding licensed from Skydance)
- Sister channels: Discovery Channel; Food Network; Investigation Discovery; Magnolia Network

History
- Launched: January 1, 2025; 22 months ago

Links
- Website: HGTV

HGTV is a Canadian exempt discretionary specialty channel owned by the Toronto-based Rogers Sports & Media. Based on the U.S. cable network of the same name, it broadcasts programming related to real estate, home and garden design, and renovation.

== History ==
HGTV is one of five specialty networks that were relaunched by Rogers on January 1, 2025, after the June 2024 announcement that it had acquired the rights to Warner Bros. Discovery factual and lifestyle brands. The channel succeeds a previous iteration of HGTV that was majority-owned by Corus Entertainment; this channel rebranded as Home Network on December 30, 2024, with a programming slate that phases out first-run HGTV programs in favour of other acquisitions.

== Programming ==
In June 2025, Rogers announced its first slate of original programming for the channel, including The County with Sarah Keenleyside, Small Town Escapes with Colin & Justin, Home Town Takeover Canada, and three series from Scott Brothers Entertainment (The Emily Michelle Project, Top of the Block, and Property Brothers: Under Pressure).

In September 2025, Rogers announced an exclusive multi-year development deal with long-time Home Network/HGTV personality Bryan Baeumler beginning in 2027; Rogers announced series featuring the Baeumlers as part of its 2026–27 slate, including Baeumler Ranch, Sarah Baeumler By Design, and Home Town Takeover Canada.
