= Woodshedding =

Rehearsing a difficult part of a song until it can be performed flawlessly

"Woodshedding", or shedding, is a term commonly used to describe the act of practicing some endeavor, usually in private, to improve one's proficiency in performing it. It is typically used by musicians to mean rehearsing a difficult passage repeatedly, until it can be performed flawlessly. The term is used metaphorically where "the woodshed" means any private place to practice without being heard by anyone else. This is based on the assumption that an actual woodshed would likely be in a remote location, away from the main house. The term is also used in other contexts.

== In jazz music ==
In jazz lingo, woodshedding is often shortened to 'shed or 'shedding. According to Paul Klemperer, a Texas-based jazz educator, woodshedding is more than just practicing –it is "the place where you work out the techniques that form the foundation of your improvisational ability".

== In barbershop singing ==
In barbershop music, woodshedding can mean starting only with a melody and working out harmonies by ear without benefit of notated music.

== Other uses ==
In legal parlance, "woodshedding" refers to the instruction given to a witness to make him respond in one party's favor. It is the act of coaching a witness or unfairly prejudicing him during ex parte communications. Ethical questions are involved, since lawyers cannot suborn perjury or use false testimony. This fits with the concept of the metaphor of a "woodshed" being a private place where such conspiracy might occur. It is also called "horse shedding" and involves practice questions and answers or even a mock trial.
