= Noise gate =

Audio processing device

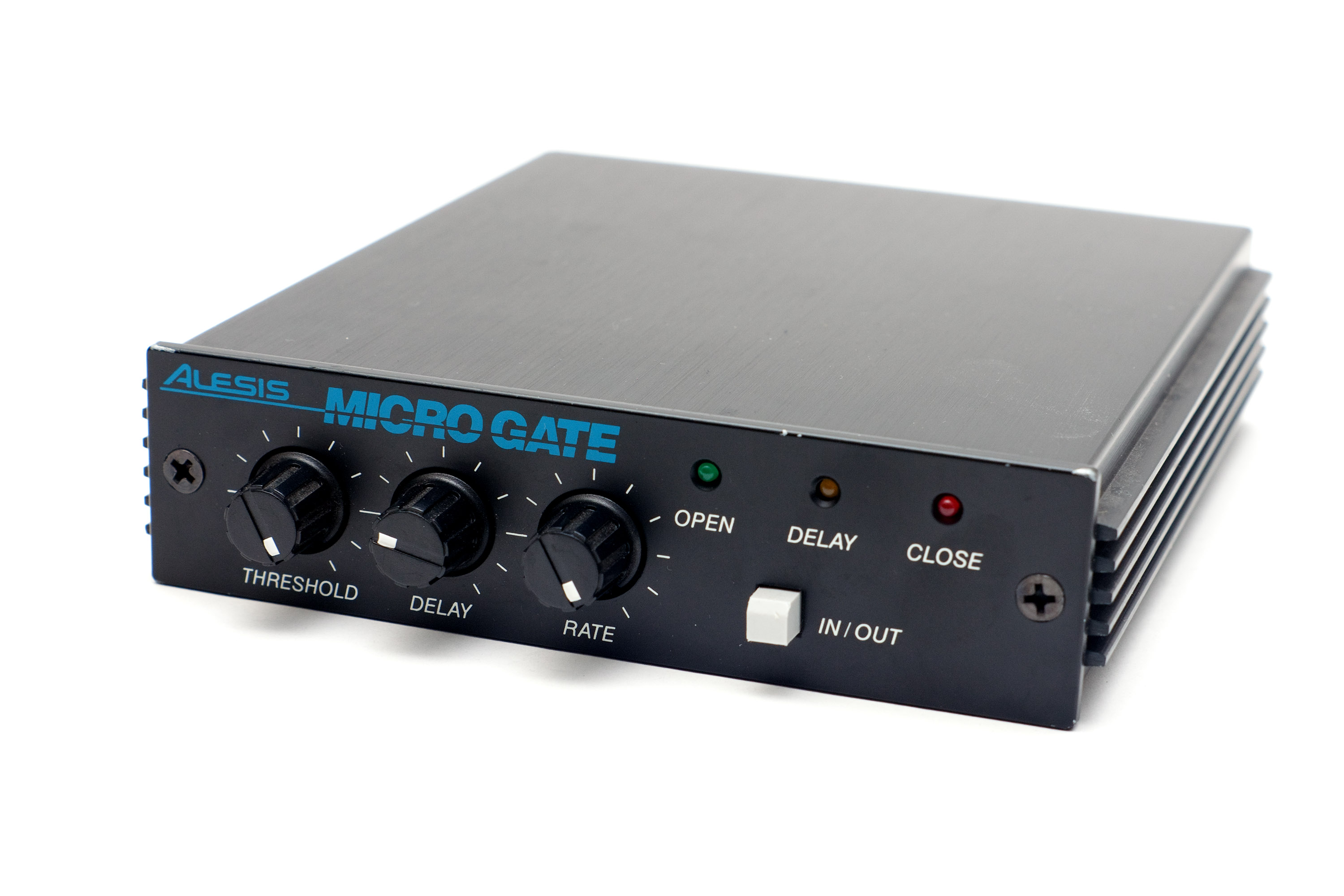
An Alesis Micro Gate noise gate

A noise gate or simply gate is an electronic device or software that is used to control the volume of an audio signal. Comparable to a limiter, which attenuates signals above a threshold, such as loud attacks from the start of musical notes, noise gates attenuate signals that register below the threshold. However, noise gates attenuate signals by a fixed amount, known as the range. In its simplest form, a noise gate allows a main signal to pass through only when it is above a set threshold: the gate is open. If the signal falls below the threshold, no signal is allowed to pass (or the signal is substantially attenuated): the gate is closed. A noise gate is used when the level of the signal is above the level of the unwanted noise. The threshold is set above the level of the noise, and so when there is no main signal, the gate is closed.

A common application is with electric guitar to remove hum and hiss noise caused by distortion effects units. A noise gate does not remove noise from the signal itself; when the gate is open, both the signal and the noise will pass through. Even though the signal and the unwanted noise are both present in open gate status, the noise is not as noticeable. The noise becomes most noticeable during periods where the main signal is not present, such as a bar of rest in a guitar solo. Gates typically feature attack, release, and hold settings and may feature a look-ahead function.

The attack, hold, and release functions of a noise gate

== Controls and parameters ==
A noise gate without hysteresis can open and close undesirably with a fluctuating signal (top). With hysteresis, the noise gate does not chatter.

Noise gates have a threshold control to set the level at which the gate will open. More advanced noise gates have more features.

The release control is used to define the length of time the gate takes to change from open to fully closed. It is the fade-out duration. A fast release abruptly cuts off the sound, whereas a slower release smoothly attenuates the signal from open to closed, resulting in a slow fade-out. If the release time is too short, a click can be heard when the gate re-opens. Release is the second-most common control to find on a gate, after threshold.

The attack control is used to define the length of time the gate takes to change from closed to fully open. It is the fade-in duration.

The hold control is used to define the length of time the gate will stay fully open after the signal falls below the threshold, and before the release period is commenced. The hold control is often set to ensure the gate does not close during short pauses between words or sentences in a speech signal.

The range control is used to set the amount of attenuation to be applied to the signal when the gate is closed. Often, there will be complete attenuation, that is no signal will pass when the gate is closed. In some circumstances, complete attenuation is not desired, and the range can be changed.

Advanced gates have an external sidechain. This is an additional input that allows the gate to be triggered by another audio signal. A variation of a sidechained noise gate used in electronic music production is a trancegate or just simply gate, where the noise gate is not controlled by an audio signal but a preprogrammed pattern, resulting in a precisely controlled chopping of a sustained sound.

Noise gates often implement hysteresis, that is, they have two thresholds: one to open the gate and another, set a few dB below, to close the gate. This means that once a signal has dropped below the close threshold, it has to rise to the open threshold for the gate to open, so that a signal that crosses over the close threshold regularly does not open the gate and cause chattering. A longer hold time also helps to avoid chattering, as described above.

== Roles ==
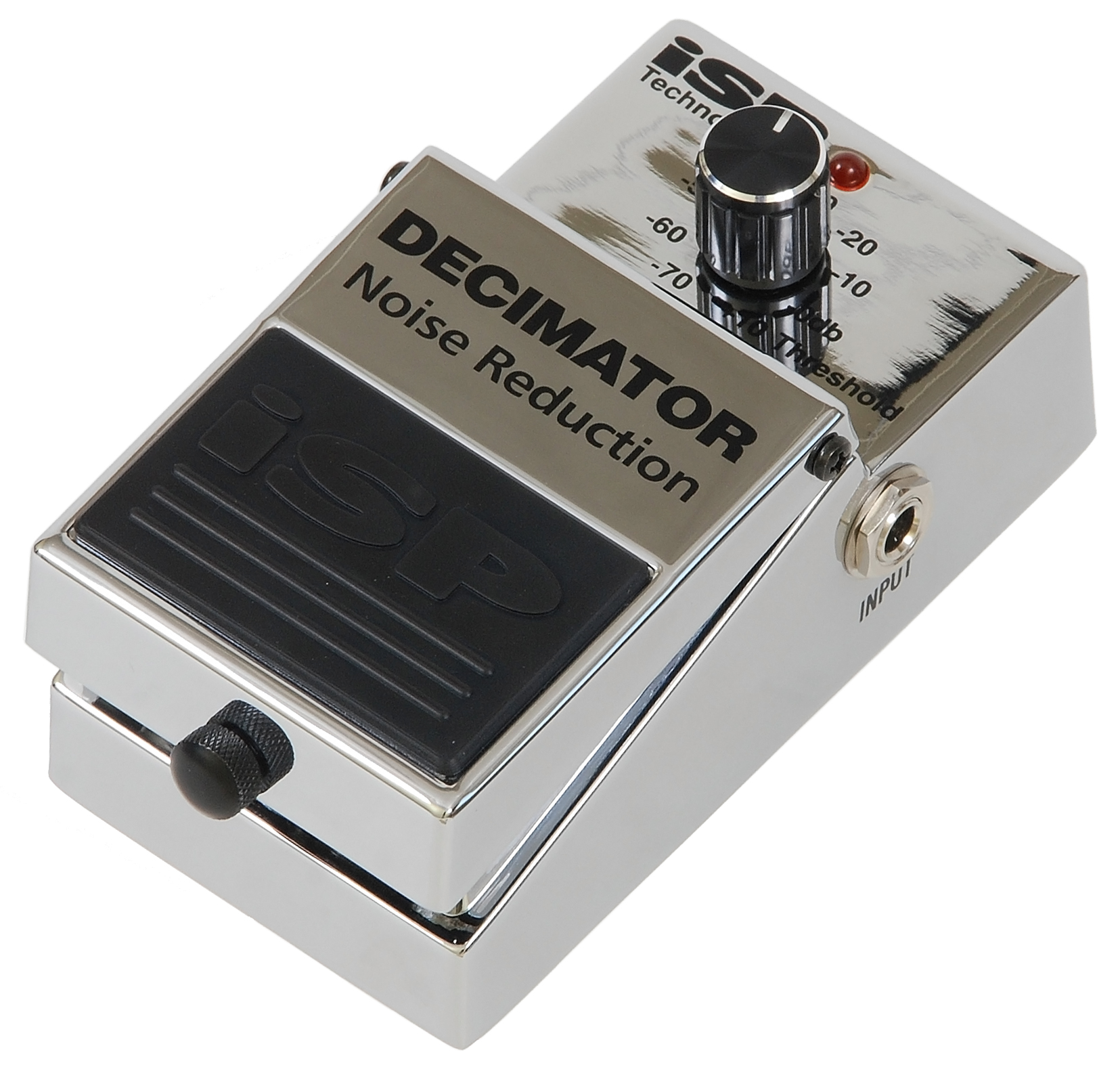
A stompbox-format gate designed for use with electric guitar

The basic function of a noise gate is to eliminate sounds below a given threshold. Noise gates are commonly used in the recording studio and sound reinforcement. Rock musicians may also use small portable stompbox units to control unwanted noise from their guitar amplification systems. Band-limited noise gates are also used to eliminate background noise from audio recordings by eliminating frequency bands that contain only static.

== Audio noise reduction ==
In audio post-processing, noise gating reduces steady noise sources such as rumble from LP records, hiss from audio tape, static from a radio or amplifier, and hum from a power system, without greatly affecting the source sound. An audio signal, such as music or speech, is broken up into many frequency bands by a collection of overlapping band-pass filters, and if the signal amplitude in any one band is lower than a preset threshold, then that band is eliminated from the final sound. This greatly reduces perceptible background noise because only the frequency components of the noise that are within the gated passbands survive.

The technique was implemented in real-time electronics in some audiophile record players as early as the 1980s, and is now commonly used in audio production post-processing, where software to Fourier transform the audio signal can yield a very detailed spectrum of the background noise. Common digital audio editing software packages such as CoolEdit and Audacity include easy-to-use digital noise gating code: the user selects a segment of audio that contains only static, and the amplitude levels in each frequency band are used to determine the threshold levels to be applied across the signal as a whole.

Noise gating works well when the static is steady and either narrowly confined in frequency (e.g., hum from AC power) or well below the main signal level (15 dB minimum is desirable). In cases where the signal merges with the background static (for example, the brushed drum sounds in the "Sun King" track on the Beatles album Abbey Road) or is weak compared to the noise (as in very faint tape recordings, the noise gating can add artifacts that are more distracting than the original static.

In the context of a multi-microphone recording session, noise gating is employed to reduce the leakage of sound into a microphone from sources other than the one for which the microphone was intended. One example involves the mic-ing up of a drum kit. In most multi-mic drum recordings, one microphone will be used to capture the snare drum sound and another to capture the kick drum sound. The snare microphone will output a signal composed of a high-level snare signal and a lower-level kick drum signal (due to the further distance of the kick drum from the snare microphone). If the threshold level of the noise gate is set correctly, a snare drum signal can be isolated. To fully isolate the snare drum signal, the release rate has to be quite fast, which can cause the tail end of the snare sound to be chopped off. This can usually be remedied by the inclusion of one or more overhead microphones, which can act as a general audio glue for all the other gated sources.

Noise gates are useful when editing live recordings to remove background noise between passages or pieces of dialogue. However, care must be taken in setting the gates so they do not trigger due to spurious noises.

For vocal applications on stage, an optical microphone switch may be used rather than a noise gate. An infrared sensor senses if someone is in front of the microphone and switches on the microphone.

== Recording usages ==
A good example of time-controlled noise gating is the well-known gated reverb effect heard on the drums on the Phil Collins hit single "In the Air Tonight", created by engineer-producer Hugh Padgham, in which the powerful reverberation added to the drums is cut off by the noise gate after a few milliseconds, rather than being allowed to decay naturally. This can also be achieved by: sending the dry snare signal to the reverb (or other process) unit, inserting a noise gate on the path of the reverb signal and connecting the snare sound to the side chain of the gate unit. With the gate unit set to external sidechain (or external key), the gate will respond to the snare signal level and cut off when that has decayed below the threshold, not the reverberated sound.

It is a common production trick to use spurious combinations of side chain inputs to control longer, more sustained sounds. For example, a hi-hat signal can be used to control a sustained synthesized sound to produce a rhythmic melodic (or harmonic) signal which is perfectly in time with the hi-hat signal. A good example of this use of the device can be found on the Godley & Creme concept album Consequences. The album's story required the creation of a number of special sound effects that would convey the impression of natural disasters.

For the "Fire" sequence, Godley and Creme used a noise gate, triggered by the sound of multitracked voices, that created the voice of a raging bushfire. During the recording of this segment, each time the voice signal began, it triggered the noise gate to open up another channel, which carried a pre-recorded loop of a crackling sound (created by overdubbing the sound of Bubble Wrap being popped in front of a microphone). The combined voices and crackling created an eerie and quite convincing talking fire effect.

"One thing I did that I think gave the album a certain sound was I Kepexed everything," said Alan Parsons, engineer on Pink Floyd's The Dark Side of the Moon. "Kepexes were very early noise gates, and we Kepexed not only going from the first sixteen-track to the second, but also on the mix. They were quite revolutionary at the time and they had a very individual sound. It was very effective on the heartbeats. That was a kick drum, and you hear the noise being modulated by a noise gate, which is an integral part of that sound."

=== Multi-latch gating ===
The invention of a technique, called multi-latch gating by Jay Hodgson, common in classical music recordings for years, is often credited to producer Tony Visconti, whose use on David Bowie's "'Heroes'" may have been the first in rock. Visconti recorded Bowie's vocals in a large space using three microphones placed 9 inches (23 cm), 20 feet (6.1 m), and 50 feet (15.2 m) away, respectively. A different gate was applied to each microphone so that the farther microphone was triggered only when Bowie reached the appropriate volume, and each microphone was muted as the next one was triggered.

"Bowie's performance thus grows in intensity precisely as ever more ambience infuses his delivery until, by the final verse, he has to shout just to be heard....The more Bowie shouts to be heard, in fact, the further back in the mix Visconti's multi-latch system pushes his vocal tracks [dry audio being perceived as front and ambience pushing audio back in the mix], creating a stark metaphor for the situation of Bowie's doomed lovers shouting their love for one another over the Berlin wall."

=== Trance gating ===
Envelope following (also called trance gating because of its prevalence in trance music) is the use of a gate on a track additional to the one it attenuates, so called because the latter's amplitude profile will then match or closely follow that of the first. Envelope following may be used to create syncopated rhythms or to tighten sloppy performances. For example, a synth pad may play whole notes while keyed to a guitar or percussion part. Examples include DJ Nexus's "Journey into Trance" (1:11), Chic's "Everybody Dance", and Diana Ross's "Upside Down".

== Sound reinforcement ==
Noise gates play an important role in drum mic'ing in heavy metal shows. The drum and cymbal mic channels will typically have noise gates so that the mics will only be turned on when the specific drum or cymbal is being played. This dramatically reduces "bleeding" between the drum mics. This is used to reduce audio feedback triggered by other highly amplified sounds onstage.

== See also ==
- Dynamic noise limiter
- Audio spill
