= Spill (audio) =

Sound picked up from a source other than intended

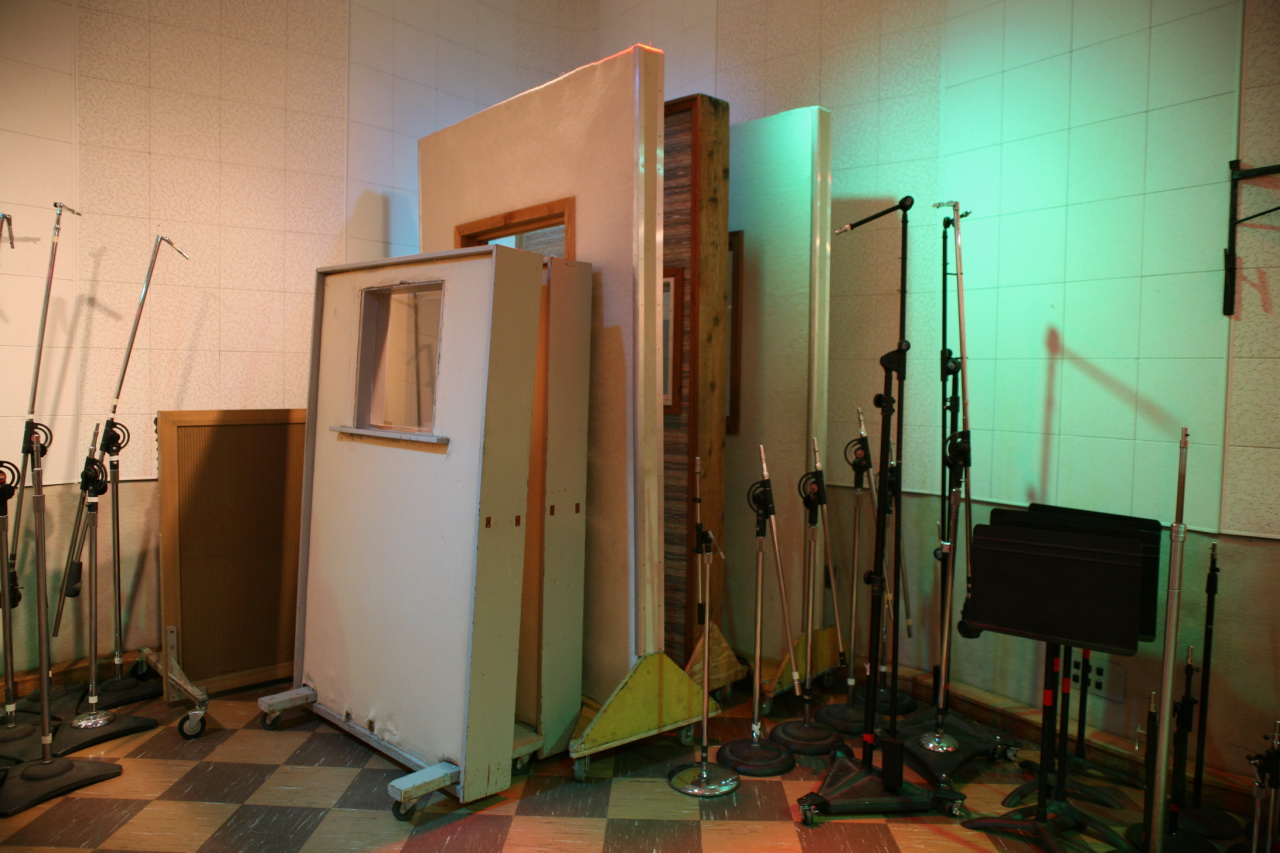
Recording studios use partitions and fabric screens to reduce microphone bleed.

Spill (also known as bleed and leakage) is the occurrence in sound recording (particularly in close miking) and live sound mixing whereby sound is picked up by a microphone from a source other than that which is intended. Spill is usually seen as a problem, and various steps are taken to avoid it or reduce it. In some styles of music, such as orchestral music, jazz, and blues, it is more likely to be accepted or even seen as desirable.

== Occurrence ==
Spill occurs when sound is detected by a microphone not intended to pick it up (for example, the vocals being detected by the microphone for the guitar). Spill is often undesirable in popular music recording, as the combined signals during the mix process can cause phase cancellation and may cause difficulty in processing individual tracks. It also causes difficulty in overdubbing, where the spill from the sound being replaced may still be audible on other channels. For sound reinforcement in live shows, mic bleed can make it hard for the sound engineer to control the levels of the different instruments and vocals onstage. For example, if an electric guitarist's loud amplifier is bleeding into the drum and vocal mics, it may be hard for the sound engineer to reduce the volume of the guitar in the onstage mix.

Spill can also introduce sounds which are not desired as part of the recording or live sound mix, such as the sound of a squeaking piano pedal, the clacking of keys on a bassoon, or the rustling of papers on a public speaker's podium.

Spill is sometimes accepted or even desirable, particularly in classical music recordings, as it can create a natural sound between instruments. A guide to orchestral recordings notes that an "advantage in using a ribbon mic on the brass is that ... there will be a slight pickup of the strings on those mics which gives you a nice depth of field on the strings due to mic bleed (i.e., strings bleeding into the brass mics on the other side of the stage)". For some classical recordings, the spacious sound of mic bleed is simulated. The "SPACE programming module ... uses delay and phasing to emulate positioning and microphone bleed within a heavily multi-miked sound stage that has come to define that [orchestral] film score sound we are all used to hearing".

This is also true for drum recording and productions that need a "live" feel. Whereas pop songs are often recorded one track at a time, for jazz and blues and other improvisation-based music, it is often desirable to have the band perform together, because this creates a better "feel" and more "swing", and because the musicians typically "feed" off each other's ideas in real time. For example, in a jazz tune, the "comping" musicians will alter their improvised accompaniment in response to the solo lines played by the saxophone player; as well, in some cases, the comping musicians will introduce melodic or rhythmic ideas which are picked up by the solo improviser.

In Jamaican reggae and dub, mic bleed is purposely used in recordings.

Spill is often experienced with vocal recording, when the accompaniment is monitored through speakers or open-backed headphones. It may also be a problem in studios without talkback facilities.

== Avoiding spill ==
Spill on a snare drum recording
On this recording of a snare drum, the other parts of the drum kit (including cymbals and bass drum) can be heard through the snare drum microphone

A snare drum recording with gating to reduce the effect of the spill
On this recording of a snare drum, the other parts of the drum kit (including cymbals and bass drum) have been attenuated through the use of a noise gate

A full drum kit recording
On this recording of a drum kit, controlled levels of spill are used to blend the individual drums together. The reverb is natural, and has spilled into the overhead microphones

Recording engineers and live sound engineers aim to avoid spill by:

- Placing microphones closer to the sound source
- Using acoustic barriers (known as gobos); for live sound, plexiglass screens are sometimes used for drums and brass.
- Reducing sound reflection in the recording room (e.g., by draping blankets on walls and windows)
- Having the different instruments and amplifiers set up in different isolation booths or rooms (particularly with loud electric guitar amplifiers)
- Recording every instrument and vocal one at a time using a multi-track recording system.
- Using directional microphones
- Maximising the distance between sound sources
- Using DI units rather than microphones
- Using piezoelectric pickups (e.g., with an upright bass)
- For vocalists, using closed-shell headphones
- Cutting frequencies with an equalizer that are not present in the intended microphone's instrument or vocals (e.g., for a bass drum mic, all of the high frequencies could safely be cut; for a piccolo, all of the bass frequencies could be cut)
- Align tracks whenever possible, taking into account that some audio sources have more pollutants than others. For that, it is better to use a plug-in tool for "finding similarities and time differences".

Spill is also avoided by using a 3:1 distance rule of thumb, which states that for each unit of distance between a sound source and its microphone, other microphones should be placed at least three times as far.

Other methods of minimising spill include the use of noise gates.

== Examples ==
Spill is evident on The Beatles' song "Yesterday", where Paul McCartney overdubbed his lead vocal. He had originally recorded acoustic guitar and vocals together on different tracks, though the spill of vocals onto the acoustic guitar track gave an effect similar to double tracking. Spill can also be heard on the vocal track of Christina Aguilera's "Beautiful". Engineer Dave Pensado said that although the vocal track contained spill from Aguilera's headphones, the "bleed is honest", which suited the song as it was "about being beautiful and honest in every way".

The effect can also be observed when operating a record player in the same room as the loudspeakers. Depending on the construction of the player the sound may acoustically couple into the record player's dust cover or other mechanical parts and cause a feedback loop into the magnetic cartridge.

== See also ==
- Print-through
- Crosstalk
- Microphonics
- Glossary of jazz and popular music § bleed

== Sources ==
- Brice, Richard (2001), Music Engineering, Oxford: Newnes, ISBN 0-7506-5040-0
- Crich, Tim (2005), Recording tips for engineers: for cleaner, brighter tracks, Kidlington, Oxfordshire: Focal Press, ISBN 0-240-51974-4
- Eargle, John (2005), Handbook of Recording Engineering, Berlin: Birkhäuser, ISBN 0-387-28470-2
- Huber, David Miles (2005), Modern Recording Techniques (6th ed.), Kidlington, Oxfordshire: Focal Press, ISBN 0-240-80625-5
- Lewisohn, Mark (1989), The Beatles Recording Sessions, New York, NY: Harmony, ISBN 0-517-57066-1
- Nisbett, Alec (2003), The Sound Studio: Audio Techniques for Radio, Television, Film and Recording, Kidlington, Oxfordshire: Focal Press, ISBN 0-240-51911-6
- Recording Microphones (2010), Achieving Good Lead Vocal Recordings, Nottingham, Nottinghamshire: Recording Microphone
- McKinney, Des (2007), 10 Recording Bloopers That Made the Album, Toronto: Hometracked
- Robjohns, Hugh (2004), "Q. Can I use acoustic screens to effectively prevent drum spill?", Sound on Sound, Cambridge: SOS Publications
- Senior, Mike (2009), "Q. What is the best way to reduce bleed on a drum recording?", Sound on Sound, Cambridge: SOS Publications
- Wellington College (2011), Close-Mic Techniques, Crowthorne, Berkshire: Wellington College
- White, Paul (2007), "Recording Loud Bands In The Studio", Sound on Sound, Cambridge: SOS Publications
