= Glossary of jazz and popular music =

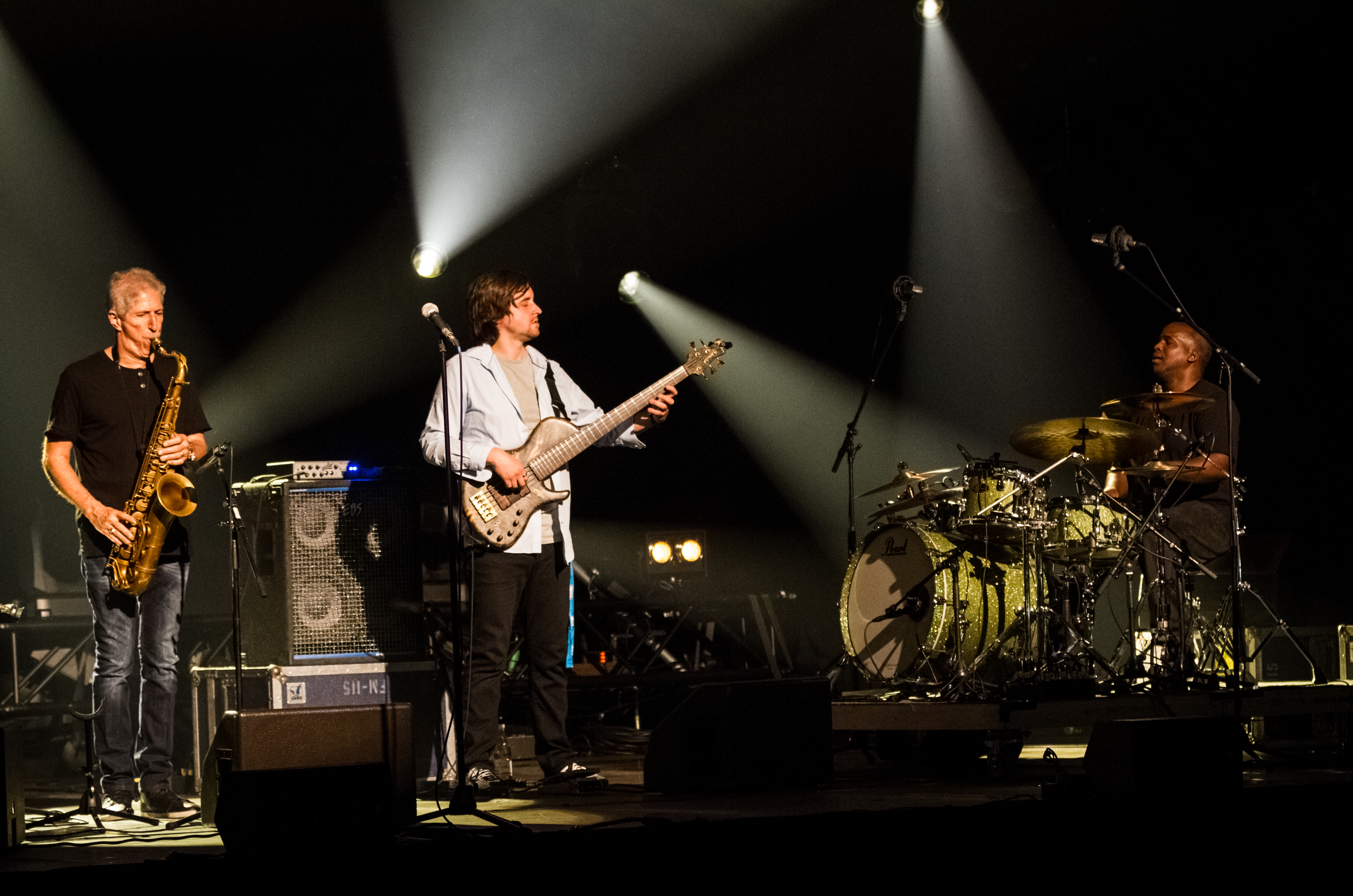
As this photo shows, popular music genre bands use acoustic instruments (such as sax and drums) and electric instruments (such as electric bass), all of which are amplified through a PA system of speakers. Pictured are the Yellowjackets, a jazz-rock fusion band.

This is a glossary of jazz and popular music terms that are likely to be encountered in printed popular music songbooks, fake books and vocal scores, big band scores, jazz, and rock concert reviews, and album liner notes. This glossary includes terms for musical instruments, playing or singing techniques, amplifiers, effects units, sound reinforcement equipment, and recording gear and techniques which are widely used in jazz and popular music. Most of the terms are in English, but in some cases, terms from other languages are encountered (e.g. to do an "encore", which is a French term).

== 0–9 ==
1×10″

A speaker cabinet containing one 10-inch (25 cm) loudspeaker. Used for small venue PA cabinets and small stage monitor speakers (with a horn), and lightweight bass guitar or electric guitar combination amplifiers ("combos") and cabinets designed for rehearsal monitoring or practice.

1×12″

A speaker cabinet containing one 12-inch (30 cm) loudspeaker. Used for mid-sized venue PA cabinets and stage monitor speakers (with a horn), and lightweight bass and guitar combos and cabinets.

1×15″

A speaker cabinet containing one 15-inch (38 cm) loudspeaker. Used for PA cabinets and stage monitor speakers (with a horn), bass combos and cabinets, and in small venue subwoofer cabinets.

1×18″

A speaker cabinet containing one 18-inch (46 cm) loudspeaker, typically used in subwoofer cabinets for PA applications.

1×21″

A speaker cabinet containing one 21-inch (53 cm) loudspeaker, typically used in large subwoofer cabinets for PA applications.

2×10″

A speaker cabinet containing two 10-inch (25 cm) loudspeakers. Used in electric guitar and bass combos and cabinets.

2×12″

A speaker cabinet containing two 12-inch (30 cm) loudspeakers. Used in electric guitar and bass combos and cabinets and, with a horn, as a PA cabinet.

2×15″

A speaker cabinet containing two 15-inch (38 cm) loudspeakers. Used in bass cabinets and, with a horn, as a PA cabinet.

2×18″

A speaker cabinet containing two 18-inch (46 cm) loudspeakers, typically used as a subwoofer for PA applications or in dance clubs.

4×10″

A speaker cabinet containing four 10-inch (25 cm) loudspeakers. Used in electric guitar and bass combos and cabinets.

4×12″

A speaker cabinet containing four 12-inch (30 cm) loudspeakers. Commonly used in electric guitar amplifier systems, less so in bass. Configured with all four speakers on the same panel or with the top two speakers angled upward.

4-track (or "four-track")

A simple portable recording and mixing device widely used in the 1970s and 1980s which used compact cassettes.

5-string (or five-string)

An electric bass with five strings, which often means the addition of a low "B" string.

6-string (or six-string)

An electric bass with six strings, which often means the addition of a low "B" string and a high "C" string. (Note: in uncommon cases, basses with even more strings are used. 6-string bass may as well refer to bass guitar tuned as a typical guitar with an octave down, such as Fender Bass VI). It is also a common slang term for a regular guitar.

7-inch

See 45 in this list.

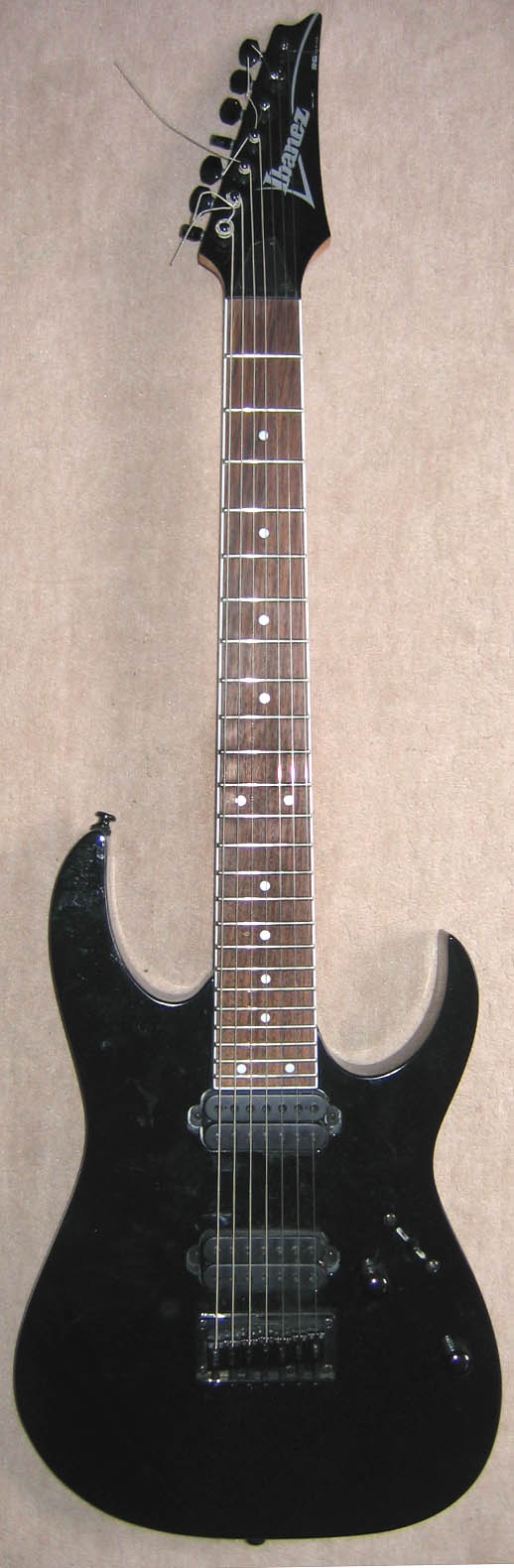
A seven-string electric guitar, the Ibanez RG7321BK

7-string or seven-string

An [electric] guitar with seven strings, which often means the addition of a low B string. Seven-string guitars are associated with jazz, fusion, and metal styles.

8-string or eight-string

An [electric] guitar with eight strings, which often means the addition of a low F♯ string and a low "B" string. Eight-string guitars are associated with jazz, fusion, and metal styles.

8-track

A tape format popular in the 1970s.

8×10″

...with eight ten-inch loudspeakers. Used in electric guitar and bass cabinets. It is sometimes called a "stack", and, in the case of a bass cabinet, a "bass stack".

10

In electric guitar parlance, turning a volume knob (or distortion knob) to the highest setting (usually marked "10").

11th

Refers to chords containing the eleventh note of a scale, which is the fourth scale degree up an octave (e.g. an F note in a C minor chord). Elevenths are mostly used on minor chords, sus chords, and dominant chords. The eleventh may be sharpened by one semitone to give a sharp eleventh chord (e.g. D^{7} with sharp 11 adds a G♯ to the basic D, F♯, A, C notes).

12-inch

A long-format vinyl record that can hold more than 20 minutes of content per side, often called an LP (long-playing) or album.

12-string

Both electric guitars and acoustic guitars are available in 12-string versions. Three of the added strings are doubling the standard strings at the unison, and three are an octave higher.

13th

Refers to chords containing the thirteenth note of a scale, which is the sixth scale degree up an octave (e.g. an A note added to a C^{7} chord). Thirteenths are mostly used on dominant chords and major chords, and to a lesser degree, minor chords. The thirteenth may be flattened by one semitone to give a flat 13 chord (e.g. D^{7} with flat 13 adds a B♭ to the basic D, F♯, A, C notes). Flat 13 chords are altered dominants.

33 1/3

A vinyl record designed to be played at 33 1/3 rotations per minute. A 12-inch 33 1/3 record has about enough space more than 20 minutes per side.

45

A 7-inch vinyl record designed to be played at 45 rotations per minute. A 45 record has about enough space for one song on each side.

78

An old-fashioned record designed to be played at 78 rotations per minute.

303

Refers to a Roland bassline synthesizer from the 1980s, the TB-303. The squelchy sound of the 303 features prominently in acid house music.

808

Refers to a Roland drum machine from the 1980s, the TR-808. The TR-808 drum sounds were widely used in electronic dance music. In the 2010s, some of its drum sounds continue to be used in DJ mixes.

== A ==
A section

In a multi-section song form, such as AB or AABA form, the first section. In 32-bar AABA form, the first A section is the first eight bars, and it contains the main melody.

accordion

A free-reed instrument with two keyboards played with the hands, in which the sound is produced by pumping a bellows. In the piano accordion, the right hand plays chords and melody lines on a small piano-style keyboard, while the left hand plays bass notes and chords on a button board. The accordion is like a miniature organ in its conception, as it has registers (like organ stops) so the player can add octaves or change the tone. The button board usually contains 120 buttons on professional piano accordions, although there are bass button boards with 12, 24, 48, 60, or 72 buttons to save weight and costs. The bass buttons play a bass note or a bass note and its octave below. The chord buttons play three-note chords, typically major triads, minor triads, dominant seventh chords, and diminished chords. Some accordions have all buttons for both hands. Accordions are used in Zydeco, hot jazz (a type of swing), and many folk and traditional musics. Accordions are becoming less common in North America but they remain popular in Europe.

acid rock

A style of rock music from the late 1960s and early 1970s which emphasizes psychedelic imagery, unusual sound effects, and distorted guitar playing.

at liberty

The speed and manner of execution are left to the performer. In some cases, the instruction suggests that the performer improvise a part.

alt (English), alt dom, or altered dominant

A jazz term which instructs chord-playing musicians such as a jazz pianist or jazz guitarist to perform a dominant (V^{7}) chord with altered upper extensions (e.g. sharp 11th, flat 13th, etc.).

altissimo

Very high

alto

High; often refers to a particular range of voice or instrument, higher than a tenor but lower than a soprano (e.g. alto sax)

amp

An abbreviation for "amplifier" (i.e. a musical instrument amplifier or a PA system power amplifier); also an abbreviation for ampere

analog

Sound equipment in which the signal containing the voice, electric guitar signal, etc. is electrical, rather than converted into digital "1"s and "0"s (binary system). Whether analog or digital recording and effects are "better" is a subject for debate. Proponents of analog effects and mixing boards often argue that analog gear has a "warmer" or more "natural" tone.

arpeggio

Like a harp (i.e. the notes of the chords are to be played quickly one after another (usually ascending) instead of simultaneously). Arpeggios are frequently used as an accompaniment. See also broken chord.

arrangement

The preparation of an existing song or instrumental piece for a new ensemble, group, or purpose. The person who makes the arrangement is an arranger.

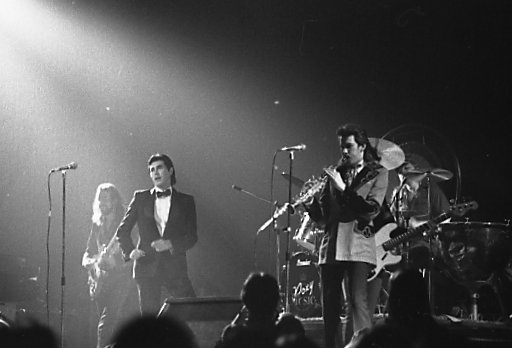
Art rock band Roxy Music performing in Toronto in 1974

art rock

An avant-garde genre of rock that is related to progressive rock (Genesis; Rush; Gentle Giant); both genres tend to use unusual instruments, meters, and timbres, and both aim toward more complex, experimental compositions and novel sonic textures.

artist and repertoire (A&R)

A department in a record company responsible for assigning songs to artists for recording and distribution, seeking out new or emerging performers to sign, and working with music publishers.

as is

A jazz term which instructs the performer to play the noted pitches as they are printed. Parts for jazz musicians in big bands often consist of lengthy sections of empty bars labelled with the changing time signatures and chord changes. Rhythm section members improvise an accompaniment (see Comp), and lead instruments improvise solos. In sections where the jazz arranger wants the performers to read notated pitches rather than improvise, they indicate this with the notation "as is".

autotune

A pitch correction effect that corrects sung or played pitches. With extreme settings, it creates unusual sounds that are used in some pop and hip-hop genres.

== B ==
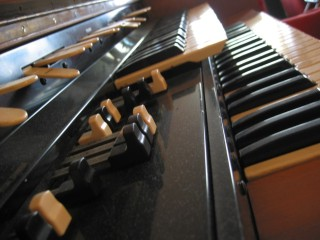
A close-up of the Hammond L-100 organ, with the drawbars in the foreground

B-3

The B-3, a widely used version of the Hammond organ, an electromechanical, tonewheel-based keyboard instrument.

B-section

A second section of a song typically following the initial verse. It uses different chords or melodic center and typically leads into a chorus, hence it is sometimes referred to as a "pre-chorus". Alternatively in some parlance "B-section" might refer to a bridge (see "bridge" below) occurring anywhere in a song once or twice.

back-beat

Beats 2 and 4 in 4/4 time, particularly when they are strongly accented. A term more used in rock 'n' roll.

backmasking

Recording a sound and then flipping it so that when it is replayed, it sounds backward. Backmasking was explored as a recording studio effect in the psychedelic 1960s. A moral panic was created when some listeners claimed to hear evil, Satanic messages in backmasked sections. While any recorded music can be backmasked, it is most effective when applied to individual instruments.

ballad

A slow song, often on a romantic or emotional theme.

barre chord or bar chord

A guitar chord in which the first (or another finger) holds down two or more adjacent strings (that is, it "bars" several notes).

bass

The lowest-pitched voice of the standard four voice ranges (bass, tenor, alto, soprano); the lowest melodic line in a musical composition, often thought of as defining and supporting the harmony; in a jazz or popular music context, the term usually refers to the double bass or the electric bass.

bassline

The low-pitched instrumental part or line played by a rhythm section instrument, often by an electric bass player or upright bassist, but a bassline can also be performed on organ, piano, or even guitar. While basslines emphasize the root and the fifth of the chord, other chord tones, notably the third and seventh, are used to express the type of chord and add musical interest. (see also "line")

beat

The pronounced rhythm of music; or one single stroke of a rhythmic accent.

bend

Jazz term referring either to establishing a pitch, sliding down half a step, and then returning to the original pitch or sliding up half a step from the original note. With the electric guitar, bending is widely used in blues, blues-rock, and rock and, in a somewhat different fashion, in jazz.

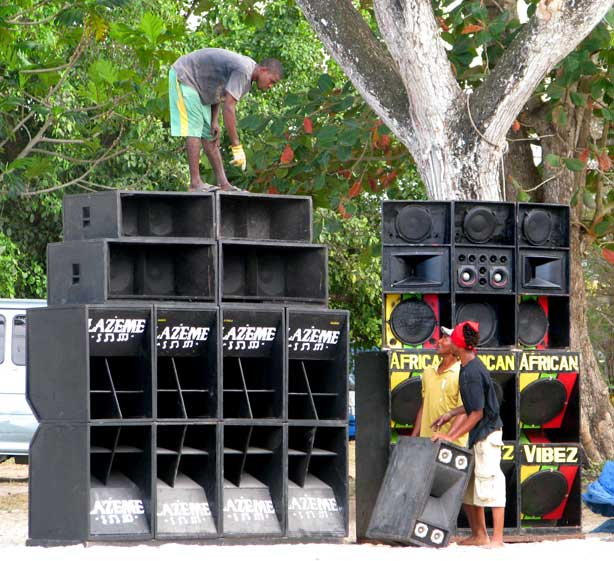
Huge bass bins were most popular in the 1980s, but they remained in use in the 2010s in venues where powerful, deep bass is required: reggae concerts, huge dance nightclubs where house music is played, and rave-type events.

bin or bass bin

A subwoofer cabinet that reproduces very low-frequency sounds, usually with some type of horn or transmission line system in a large cabinet to enhance the bass response; typically used for the main, front of house speaker system, but in rare cases may also be used as part of a bass player's bass amplifier set-up. The term "bin" was more common in the 1980s; in the 1990s and 2000s, the term "subwoofer" or "sub" was much more widely used.

binary

A musical form in two sections: AB

bleeding, bleed, or bleed-through

A term which refers to the ambient sounds that a microphone aimed at an instrument picks up from other instruments or singers in the same room. In some cases, "bleeding" is considered undesirable, if unwanted sounds from other instruments are picked up by a microphone. To prevent "bleeding", studios use isolation booths and cloth-covered room dividers. In some cases, "bleed-through" is desirable, because it makes the recording sound fuller or more "live".

block chords

A style of piano playing, developed by Milt Buckner and George Shearing, with both hands "locked" together, playing chords in parallel with the melody, usually in fairly close position. It is a technical procedure requiring much practice, and can sound dated if the harmonies are not advanced enough. Also called "locked hands".

blow

A jazz term instructing a performer to improvise a solo over the chord progression of a jazz tune; may also be written "blowing section" or, in free jazz, "open blowing". The related term "blowing changes" are the chords used to solo over in some tunes. If a jazz tune has a very complex melody, with a similarly complex chord progression, a simplified chord progression may be used for the solo improvisation section.

blue note

An altered note, often a flatted third, used for emotional effect in blues songs. On an instrument where pitch can be changed by bending notes (e.g, guitar, sax, harmonica), or with the voice, this flattening may involve using quarter tones. On the piano and Hammond organ, which cannot bend notes, the flatted third is often used with the dominant seventh chord's major third to create this effect. Other blue notes include the flat fifth and the flat seventh.

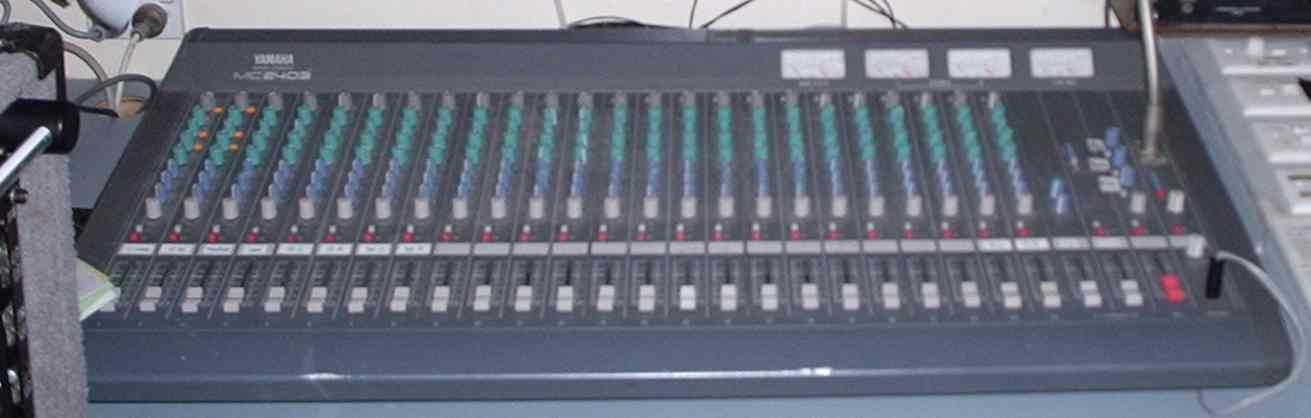
Yamaha 2403 audio mixing console (or "board") in a "live" mixing application. Each column of knobs controls the volume, tone, and other elements for a single channel (e.g. a microphone being used by a singer).

blues

In a jazz context, when "blues" or "solo on blues" appears at the start of a solo section, it is an abbreviation for "blues progression"; it instructs the performer to improvise solos over a 12-bar blues progression based on I, IV, and V^{7} chords. The term "blues" also refers to a style of soloing and playing over this type of progression.

board

A shortened form of "mixing board", which refers to the audio mixing board used by live sound engineers and studio engineers to control the volume and tone of different instruments and voices, blend them in the desired proportions, add external effects (e.g. reverb), and route the final signal (or an intermediate signal) to desired locations (e.g. to a recording device; to Front of House speakers; to monitor speakers, etc.). The term "board" may also be used as a shortened form of "fingerboard".

bomb

In jazz drumming, a "bomb" is an unexpected loud bass drum accent. In shred guitar, the term "dive bomb" refers to a dramatic effect created by heavily pressing the whammy bar to create a large descending pitch bend.

boogie

A song with a catchy, repetitive, blues-based rhythm, as used in John Lee Hooker songs such as Boogie Chillen.

bootleg

An unauthorized recording of a performance. Bootleg recordings range in quality from static-filled amateur tapings where a fan has snuck a recorder and mic into a show to the holy grail of bootlegs, the "soundboard bootleg", in which an enterprising person (who has access to the control room) has discreetly plugged a recorder into the mixing board's line out.

break

Transitional passage in which a soloist plays unaccompanied. See solo break.

bridge

Transitional passage connecting sections of a composition. A "bridge" is sometimes referred to as "the middle eight" or "B section". It usually has a contrasting harmony or feel and is used to introduce variation to songs or chord progressions which lack enough variety to keep the listener engaged. Secondly; a "bridge" refers to the part of a stringed instrument that holds the strings in place and transmits their vibrations to the resonant body of the instrument as well as being the terminus of a string's vibrational length. The other vibrational terminus is often referred to as the "nut" which is often made from bone, hard plastic, or bronze and located at the end of the fingerboard near the "head" and tuning keys.

broken chord

A chord in which the notes are not all played at once, but rather one after the other (i.e. an arpeggio).

brushes

In jazz and other acoustic genres, drummers may use brushes made of stiff wire or plastic to play instead of drumsticks. Brushes are quieter and they produce a different sound than drumsticks. One brush effect is "stirring" on the snare, which creates a sustained sound for ballads.

bubbles

A term most used within reggae music to describe an electronic or Hammond organ part of short duration (usually an eighth-note in length) typically played on the second and fourth beats of a 4/4 progression. It is most often voiced with a dark and "wet" or reverberated sound, creating an effect that subtly "percolates" within the domain of the rhythm section.

== C ==
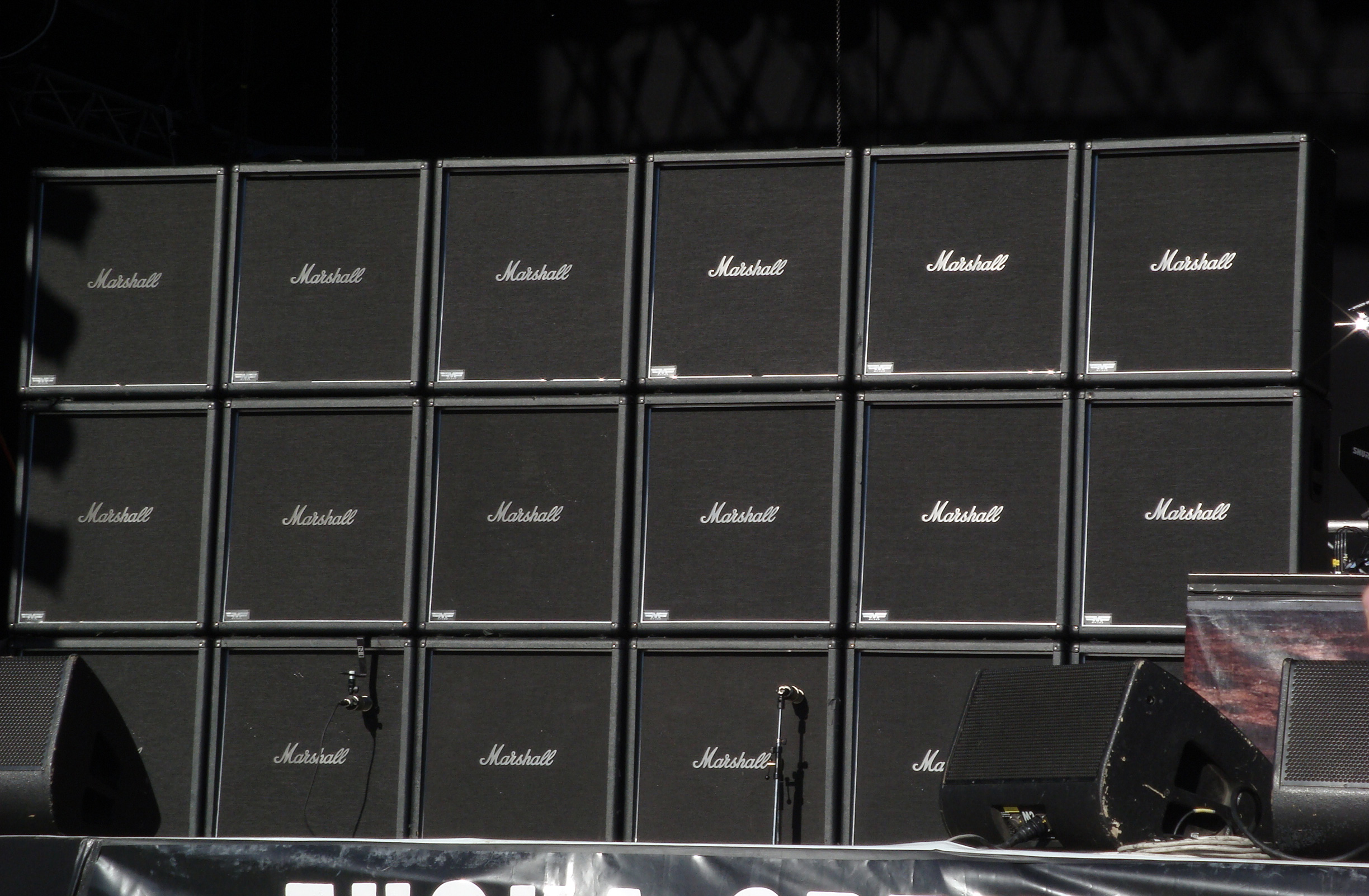
Some heavy metal electric guitarists use a large number of empty guitar speaker cabinets for the visual effect.

cabinet or cab

A speaker cabinet, which is a wooden (or less commonly plastic) enclosure for a loudspeaker and, in some cases a horn or tweeter. Speaker cabinets are used to amplify instruments and vocals. Guitar and bass cabinets are usually made of plywood. Vintage PA cabinets from the 1960s to 1980s are made of plywood, but since the 1990s, PA cabinets and monitor speakers made from plastic have been sold.

cadence

The point at which a melodic phrase "comes to rest" or resolves. A cadence often occurs on the "tonic" note (supported by the tonic chord—the "home chord" of the key). A cadence can also occur on other notes over the "tonic" chord, or over another chord such as the "dominant chord" (the chord built on the fifth scale degree). One of the features of Classical music is that cadences are often elided; that is, instead of coming to rest at the cadence, a new musical line commences at exactly the same time of the cadence. This helps to create a forward momentum in the music

call and response

A way of writing a song in which after a singer sings a line, other singers (e.g. backup singers or band members) respond with a line that completes the thought. Call and response singing was originally part of African-American work songs, and it subsequently became an important part of the blues. The same effect is used in instrumental tunes, in which a solo instrument does a melodic line and then there is a "response" from the horn section or rhythm section.

capo

A clip-on metal or plastic device with a rubber-padded bar that holds down all six strings of the guitar in a fret position selected by the performer. It is attached with an elastic or spring-loaded mechanism. It allows a guitar player to have the open strings start at a higher pitch, thus facilitating the transposition of songs and the use of the "ringing", rich sound of open chords in unusual keys.

changes

A jazz term which is an abbreviation for "chord changes", which is the harmonic progression (or "chord progression") upon which a melody is based. In jazz, some swing songs have one chord per bar, or in some cases one chord for two or four bars. In bebop, two chords per bar became common.

channel

In the context of a mixing board, a channel is one of the input sections into which a microphone or output from an instrument amplifier or instrument (e.g. an electronic keyboard) is plugged so that its volume and tone can be altered and so that it can be blended with other instruments and voices; in the context of an electric guitar amplifier or a bass amplifier, the term "channel" is used to refer to amplifiers which have two or more separate preamplifier, equalization, and effect settings ("channels") which a performer can switch between in a performance via a footswitch.

chicken pickin'

American slang for a particular touch and style of electric guitar playing best voiced on the Fender Telecaster guitar or similar "thinner" sounding instrument usually with single coil pickups and an undistorted amp tone. It employs percussive attack which when combined with alternating short and longer notes approximates or emulates the clucking and squawking of a barnyard chicken, thereby suggesting a rural flavor and the name. Sometimes played without a guitar pick, it is a standard color within traditional American country music of the 1960s and 1970s and is rarely heard outside that genre.

chord

A group of three or more notes that, when played simultaneously, can form a harmonic structure that can support a melody or a solo line. The simplest chords are triads, which are made of the first note of a scale and then alternate notes. For example, in the scale of C major (C, D, E, F, G, A, B, C), the triad would be C, E, G. Seventh chords use four notes: they consist of a triad with an added interval. For example, in the scale of G dominant (G, A, B, C, D, E, F, G), the four-note seventh chord would be G, B, D, F. There are also more complex chords that add additional intervals (see ninth chord, "altered dominant"). A chord can also be played one note at a time (see "arpeggio" and "broken chord").

chorus

1. A choir or a group of singers.
2. A section of a song typically repeated a number of times alternating with verses, bridges, solos etc. In popular music a chorus tends to be lyrically simple, easily sung and melodically memorable, or "hooky" to "hook" the listener.
3. An introduction to a song. In the 19th and early 20th centuries "chorus" described what is currently defined as an "intro", usually sung only once at the beginning of a song.
4. A chorus effect—a rich and spacious effect created when a voice or instrument is "doubled" using electronic pitch modulation mixed with the unmodulated audio. This creates a sound similar to the phasing which naturally occurs when two or more singers are performing in unison, hence the term chorus. The effect is created with a chorus effect device or software plugin.

chromatic scale

A sequence of all twelve notes in an octave, played in a row (either ascending or descending). Fragments of the chromatic scale are used in many styles of popular music, but more extensive use of chromatic scale tends to occur in jazz, jazz fusion, and the more experimental genres of rock, such as progressive rock.

clavinet

An electric clavichord built by Hohner in the 1970s and early to mid-1980s. Like an electric guitar, it has magnetic pickups and is plugged into a guitar amplifier, and can be used with effects such as wah-wah pedals or chorus effect. It was popularized by Stevie Wonder at the start of the 1970s. Its percussive, distinct sound became a fixture in funk records.

clean

In reference to the sound of an electric guitar, Fender Rhodes electric piano, or other electric or electronic instrument, or to a recording of a singer or instrument or to an entire mix, "clean" means that the sound is undistorted and not muddy. For an electric instrument, the opposite of a "clean" tone is an overdriven, "clipped" (see "clipping"), or "dirty" sound.

clean channel

Many electric guitar amplifiers have two "channels": a clean channel, which is undistorted, and an "overdrive" (or "dirty" channel), in which the signal is heavily preamplified or run through a distortion effect, thus producing a distorted signal. Amps with two channels come with footswitches which allow performers to switch between the two channels.

click track

A digital metronome used in the studio recording process. The click track is not directly heard by listeners (it is played in the headphones of studio musicians when they record), but the result of the click--perfect uniform tempo in every bar of a song--is clearly heard by listeners. Some musicians have criticized excessive use of click tracks for taking away musical expressiveness (e.g., rubato) that is produced when musicians play together without a click metronome.

clipping

A type of distortion. With vocals, acoustic instruments, front of house mixes, and monitor mixes, clipping is almost always deemed to be undesirable, and it is minimized by reducing gain levels, using compression devices, adding "pads" (attenuation circuits), etc. With electric guitars, electric basses, Hammond organs, electric piano, and other electric instruments, performers often purposefully add some clipping to the signal by boosting the gain or using an overdrive pedal.

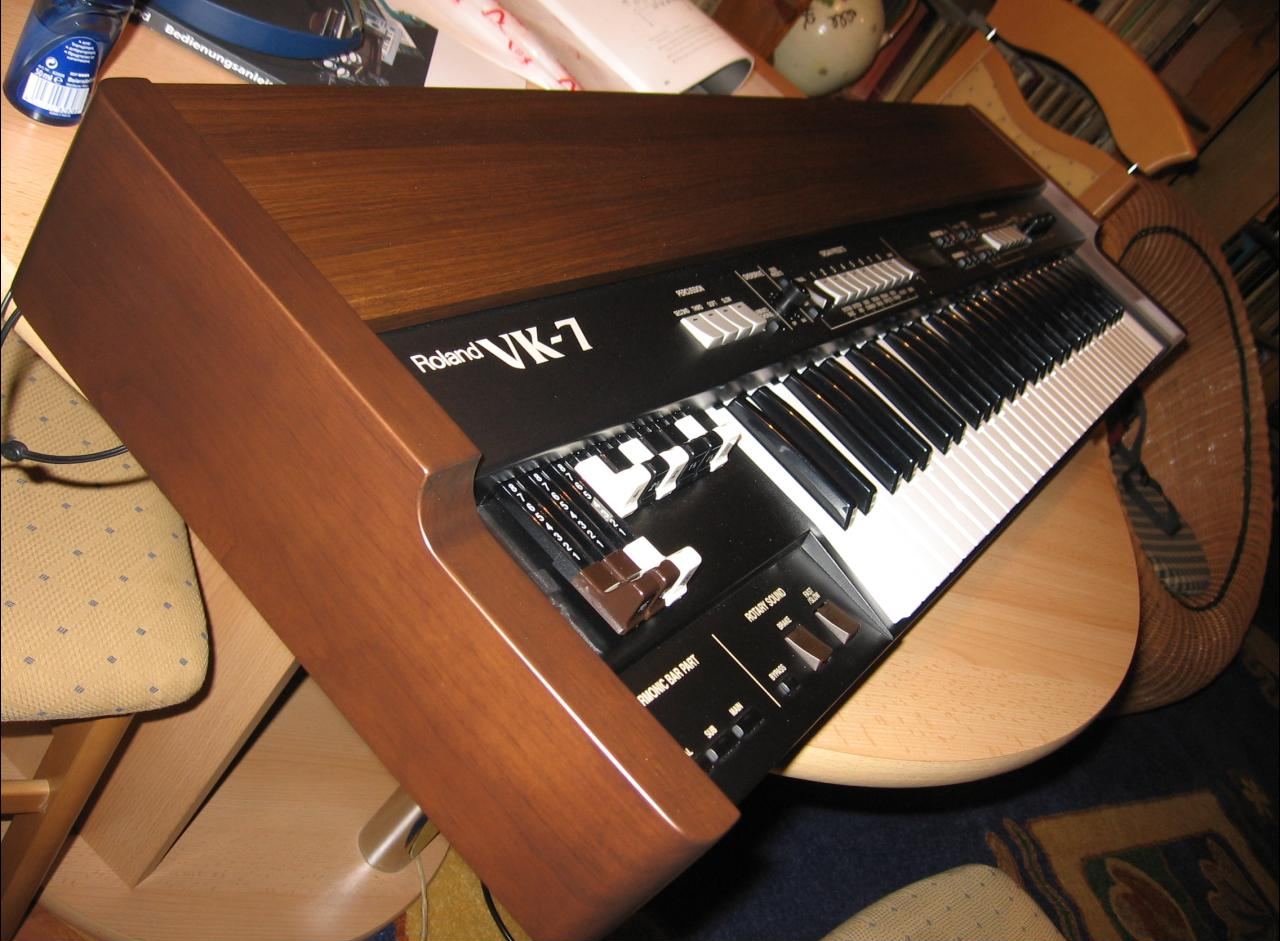
The Roland VK-7 is referred to as a "clonewheel organ", because it recreates the sound of vintage tonewheel organs like the Hammond organ.

clonewheel or clonewheel organ

An electronic or digital instrument which recreates or imitates the sound of an electromechanical tonewheel-based Hammond organ, typically in an instrument that is much lighter (in weight) and smaller than an actual Hammond organ (e.g. the Roland VK-7 or the Korg CX-3).

coda

A tail (i.e. a closing section appended to a piece of music). Also called a "tag" or "outro". It may be as simple as repeating a ii–V vamp for a few bars to as complex as a contrapuntal arrangement of eight or more bars.

colosseum ending

An expression coined by rock bands originally referring to a dramatic and loud song ending played in a large venue such as an arena or colosseum, but now heard in venues of any size. Occurring on or after the last chord of a song, typically it is 4–10 seconds of loud sustained chords often with many drum fills, cymbal swells and crashes, and improvisation from other musicians to create a steady rumbling or churning effect. Similar forceful finales are found throughout symphonic music and intended to create excitement and rouse an audience to ovation.

combo

An abbreviation for "combination", which is used in two senses in jazz and pop music. "Combo" can be the equivalent of "group" or "ensemble" (e.g. "a jazz combo"). As well, "combo" refers to a "combination amplifier", so named because it includes an amplifier and a speaker in a single cabinet.

comping

A jazz term which describes a jazz rhythm section performer (usually a chordal instrument such as jazz guitar, jazz piano, Hammond organ, etc.) playing accompaniment chords.

comping takes

Selecting or "cherry picking" the best performances from various audio tracks in order to 'bounce' or piece together one contiguous audio track. Shortened of "composite" or "compiling".

compressor

An electronic audio effect that automatically reduces the gain of a signal (vocals, instruments, etc.) to a pre-set threshold, thus preventing unwanted peaks which could cause clipping. A compressor with extreme settings becomes a limiter, which protects speakers and speaker horns from harmful peaks.

condenser microphone or condenser mic

A microphone that uses the technique of "variable capacitance" to pick up sound. The diaphragm is on a charged metal plate, and as such, condenser microphones need power to operate. The power comes either from batteries or from a mic preamp or a mixing board. The power that is provided from a preamp or mixing board is called "phantom power".

cover or cover song

When a band plays a song that has been composed and recorded by another band, this is called a "cover tune"; also used as a verb (e.g. "to cover" a song by a certain band). The term may also refer to a cover charge, the door fee charged to customers for admission to a band's performance at a bar (the cover charge may go entirely to the band or it may be split with the bar, based on the agreement between the band and the establishment).

crossfader

On a DJ mixer, a crossfader is a control that slides on a left-to-right track. It allows a DJ to alternate between two channels, into which an audio input is plugged (e.g. a record player, CD player, iPod, etc.). The left-most position of the slider control gives only channel A. The right-most position gives only channel B. The area of the sliding track between these two extremes is a blend of the two channels. Crossfaders can be used to create smooth transitions between two songs on different sound inputs, or, when moved rapidly at the same time that a record is manipulated on a turntable, they can be used to create rhythmic scratching sounds and strange effects.

crossover

In a music industry context, a "crossover artist" or "crossover band" is a performer or group from one style that has managed to garner a following amongst fans of a different musical style. For example, some country performers have managed to get "crossover" hits in the pop charts. In an audio engineering context, a crossover is a frequency filter system that divides the frequencies in a signal into low and high or low, mid, and high components. In this way, the different frequencies can be routed to the appropriate speakers.

crunch

A specific type of highly distorted, mid-boosted electric guitar tone used in heavy metal and thrash metal music, typically by the rhythm guitarist. When played with palm muting, it creates a characteristic heavy rhythmic sound. Sone amplifiers and pedals designed for metal performers have "crunch" knobs or buttons.

cut time

Same as the meter 2/2: two half-note (minimum) beats per measure. Notated and executed like common time (4/4), except with the beat lengths doubled. Indicated by the symbol. This comes from a literal cut of the symbol of common time. Thus, a quarter note in cut time is only half a beat long, and a measure has only two beats. See also alla breve.

== D ==
dead

Non-reverberant, as in the case of a room in a recording studio that has very little natural reverb or ambience (e.g. a "dead room"). To "liven up" the sound of a track recorded in a "dead room", engineers will typically add electronic reverb effects. Alternately, the track could be re-recorded in a room with more reflective surfaces, to add natural reverb.

decibel (dB)

The unit of measurement of audio level used in recording studios and by live sound engineers. Some cities and performance venues have decibel limits for live performances.

demo

A simple, relatively inexpensive recording of a band used to show their sound, style, and feel to booking agents, talent scouts, and industry managers. However, in the 2010s, the availability of affordable digital mixing and recording gear has raised the quality standard of production that is expected.

desk

British term for a "mixing board".

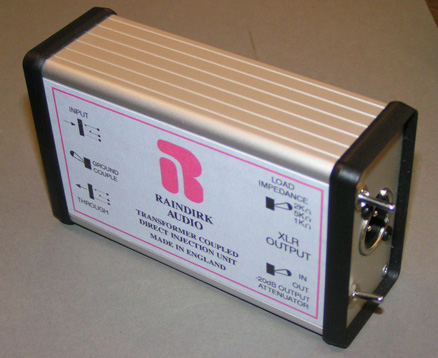
A passive DI box. It is passive because it does not need external power to operate. DI boxes which require a power source (batteries or phantom power) are called active DI boxes.

DI or DI unit

An electronic device that alters the impedance of electric instrument signals (e.g. electric guitar, electric bass) so that they can be plugged into a mixing board or PA system. The DI box converts a high-impedance, unbalanced signal from an electric guitar into a low-impedance, balanced signal. Many DI boxes have a ground lift switch to remove AC hum from the electrical system.

digital signal processing (DSP)

The use of digital effects to alter the tone, sound, pitch, or other parameters of a signal. Many 2000s-era mixers, guitar amplifiers, and electronic keyboards have on-board DSP effects.

double-time feel

This is an effect created in arrangements or improvised comping in which the rhythm section plays as if there were eight beats in a 4/4 bar (as if it were 8/8). For example, the bass player will play eight bass notes per bar rather than the typical "four beats in a bar" approach used in walking basslines. This makes the song feel twice as fast, even though the chords take the same length if time to play. A song that takes 60 seconds to play in regular feel still takes 60 seconds in double-time feel. However, if a song actually went into double time, say, for a repeat, a 60-second song would last for 30 seconds.

doubling

A doubler is a multi-instrumentalist, such as a sax player who also plays flute, a tuba player who also plays upright bass, or a clarinet player who also plays accordion. Settings and genres with extensive doubling include folk (where a musician may play fiddle, guitar, and upright bass) and musical theatre, where some wind performers play sax, clarinet, oboe, and flute. In arranging and orchestration, the term doubling may refer to having two instruments play the same part ("the melody was doubled by violin and flute") or to having a chord tone played by two different instruments ("the ninth [of the chord] was doubled in the last bar, as it was played by the sax and trumpet"). 'Doubling' is also used in the recording studio to describe a singer (or instrumentalist) overdubbing the same passage onto a second track in unison with the first performance to create a 'chorus' effect due to naturally shifting harmonics and phase relationship between the two performances.

downtuned or detuned

A guitar or bass tuned to a lower pitch than the standard tuning, which is (from lowest pitch to highest) E–A–D–G–B–E for guitar and E–A–DG for bass. A common downtuning is "drop D", in which the low E is tuned down to D to give the tonic chord in D (major or minor) a low root note.

dragging

The undesirable act of playing too slow in relation to the existing tempo when no decrease in tempo is called for. Not to be confused with intentionally or acceptably playing "behind" the beat while keeping the tempo or BPM (beats per minute) steady. It is the opposite of "rushing".

drive

An abbreviated form of "overdrive", which refers to the distortion that occurs when a tube amplifier is pushed to its limits to create a growling, thicker sound.

drop

Jazz term referring to a note that slides chromatically downward to an indefinite pitch.

drop 1

A term describing a bass part typically found in reggae music where the first beat of a measure is omitted within the context of a pattern. Its creation and use is most often attributed to Aston "Family Man" Barrett, bassist for the reggae group Bob Marley and the Wailers among others.

DSP

See "digital signal processing".

dry

A signal that has no reverb effect, or more generally, a signal that has not been processed with any effects unit. Vocals are almost always recorded "dry", and then the reverb or other effects are added in post-production. Electric guitars and electric keyboards are often, but not always recorded with their effects (distortion, chorus, etc.) already added.

dynamics

The relative volumes (loudness and softness) in the execution of a piece of music. Music with sudden changes in dynamics can be harder to mix in a live setting. To prevent sudden bursts of high volume, audio engineers can manually "ride the faders" (and rapidly decrease sudden loud parts, or use compression effects.

DX-7

The first mass-marketed, affordable synthesizer keyboard in the 1980s, which became very popular in pop and dance music of that era. The DX-7 used FM synthesis to create new electronic sounds. There were a number of synths before the DX-7, like the Fairlight CMI, but they were so expensive that they were owned by very few people.

== E ==
ear candy

An expression used (subjectively and sometimes derisively) to describe audio effects or instrumental parts which might be considered non-essential to the core arrangement or composition. Ear candy defines sonic elements such as; "sparkle", "shimmer", "depth" etc. Ear candy effects are created with rack-mounted audio processing hardware or software plugins. It is often considered acceptable or desirable within more modern popular music productions, but it is rarely heard within more "roots-based" or traditional music such as blues, bluegrass, and other styles relying more strictly on a live musical performance. See sweetening in this list.

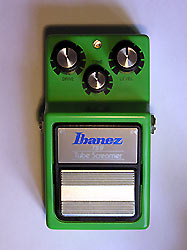
The Ibanez Tube Screamer overdrive pedal, an effects unit with a footswitch to turn the effect on and off

effects unit

An electronic device that alters or conditions the sound qualities in an electronic signal from a microphone, musical instrument, or recording. Effects units can be housed in rack-mounted chassis'; stompbox pedals; in computer software; or built into an amplifier (e.g. a guitar amp), mixer, or instrument (e.g. a Hammond organ).

encore (Fr)

Again (i.e. perform the relevant passage or an entire song or tune once more)

engineer

In a live sound context, this refers to the audio engineer who controls the soundboard or leads the crew of audio technicians; in a recording context, this refers to the audio engineer who sets up and runs the technical aspects of a recording session.

== F ==
fader

On a mixing board or DJ mixer, an audio level control that slides up and down in a track. (see also crossfader).

fakebook

A collection of lead sheets for jazz songs, typically including only the essential elements of a song: melody and chords, with the chords written in letter names with chord qualities (e.g., C, A^{7}, Dm, G^{7}). The original fakebooks were unauthorized, crudely copied publications for which copyright had not been paid to composers and songwriters or publishers. In the 1990s, legal fakebooks appeared, which had better editing and production quality, and which incorporated more arrangements (short intros or outros, or short sections with written-out chord voicings, chord melodies or basslines). A stripped-down version of fakebooks, typically the old unauthorized type, contains only the chords.

fall

Jazz term for a note of definite pitch sliding downward to another note of definite pitch.

falsetto

Male voice above usual bass or tenor range, an effect accomplished by using only half of the vocal cords. In addition to being higher in pitch, it has a lighter timbre.

feedback

The resonance loop created when a microphone or guitar pickup is placed close to a highly amplified speaker, often creating a sustained loud howling or screeching sound. In most cases, musicians and sound engineers seek to avoid feedback with microphones and acoustic instruments; with electric guitar, especially in heavy metal and shred guitar playing, it may be done on purpose.

fiddle

A slang term for a violin in bluegrass, country music, and folk music.

fill (English)

A jazz or rock term which instructs performers to improvise a scalar passage or riff to "fill in" the brief time between lyrical phrases, the lines of melody, or between two sections. Many fills are pentatonic or blues scale-based.

flat

A symbol (♭) that lowers the pitch of a note by a semitone. May also refer to a situation where a singer or musician is performing a note in which the intonation is an eighth or a quarter of a semitone too low.

foldback

In Britain, this is the term for an onstage monitor speaker that helps performers to hear their singing and playing.

forte or (f)

Strong (i.e. to be played or sung loudly)

fortepiano (fp)

Strong-gentle (i.e. 1. loud, then immediately soft) (see dynamics), or 2. an early pianoforte

fortissimo (ff)

Very loud (see note at Pianissimo)

fortississimo (fff)

As loud as possible

front of house (FOH)

The speaker system which faces the audience (and the sound engineers who control it).

four on the floor

Studio slang describing every quarter-note being struck on the bass drum or 'kick drum' of a trap drum kit, typically with force and usually in a 4/4-derived time signature.'Disco' music of the mid-1970's employs this pattern almost exclusively on the majority of that genre's most iconic dance songs.

fuzz bass

Growling, overdriven electric bass produced with a distortion effect or by turning up a tube bass amplifier. In the late 1960s, fuzz bass was associated with psychedelic rock and drug-fuelled jams. By the 1970s and 1980s, fuzz bass was used by hard rock and metal bands. In the 1980s, it was used in hardcore punk and thrash records. In the 1990s and 2000s, some pop and indie bands used the effect.

== G ==
ghostwriter

A songwriter who pens lyrics and music that will be officially credited to another person, such as a band's lead singer or the bandleader. The ghostwriter's name may still appear on the record sleeve, but they may be in the list of people who are thanked for their "help" with the project or they may be credited with "vocal arrangements"; an orchestrator who ghost-orchestrates a ballad for string section and woodwinds may be credited for "orchestration consulting" (both are euphemisms). Some ghostwriters have made legal challenges when songs they ghostwrote for a one-off fee become top hits.

gig

A slang term which refers to a paying musical engagement at a venue, usually of a single night's duration.

gliss

A continuous sliding from one pitch to another (a true glissando), or an incidental scale executed while moving from one melodic note to another (an effective glissando). Compare portamento in this list.

== H ==
half-time feel

Also called "two-feel", this is an effect created in arrangements or improvised comping in which only beats one and three (in 4/4 tunes) are played solidly, as if it were in cut time. For example, the bass player will play two bass notes per bar rather than the typical "four beats in a bar" approach used in walking basslines. This makes the song feel half as slow, even though the chords take the same length of time to play. A song that takes 60 seconds to play in regular feel still takes 60 seconds in half-time feel. However, if a song actually went into half time, say, for a repeat, a 60-second song would last for 120 seconds. See also double-time feel.

harmony vocals or harmony parts

backup singing which supports the main melody; the supporting parts are usually chord tones that form intervals of a third, fourth, fifth, sixth, or octave away from the main melody note.

harp

From blues harp, which in blues and related genres is a slang term for the harmonica.

harpsichord

A keyboard instrument in which the strings are plucked by a mechanism when the keys are pressed. While normally used in Baroque music from the 1700s, it is occasionally used in pop music.

homophony

A musical texture with one voice (or melody line) accompanied by chords; also used as an adjective (homophonic). Compare with polyphony, in which several voices or melody lines are performed at the same time.

head

The first (and last) chorus of a tune, in which the song or melody is stated without improvisation or with minimal improvisation (typically just ornamentation and filling in of rests or melody notes written as whole notes). For a 12-bar blues or other short form, the head may be repeated twice at the beginning, then there are improvised solos, then the head is done again to end the tune. On a long song, such as an AABA song, the form is played through once for the opening melody, then there are solos, and then the melody is played a final time.

honky-tonk

A live music venue for country bands in a town like Nashville. The term "honky-tonk piano" means an old upright piano in which the strings are slightly out of tune, which creates a wavering effect that, while it might be jarring in a pop ballad, is appealing on a down-home, earthy country blues song.

hook

A motif that is used in popular music to make a song appealing and to "catch the ear of the listener".

horn

In a jazz, blues, or R&B context, the term "horn" refers generically to any wind instrument (e.g. saxophone, trumpet, etc.). In a sound engineering context, "horn" refers to a flare-shaped housing into which a tweeter or loudspeaker is mounted as part of a speaker cabinet.

horn section

In a jazz, blues, or R&B context, this refers to a small group of brass players who accompany an ensemble by playing soft "pads" and punctuating the melodic line with "punches" (sudden interjections).

house band

An ensemble that performs regularly at a club or venue, which the frequency of appearance ranging from weekly, to several nights a week, to most days. The house band may also serve as a backup band for guest vocalists or solo instrumentalists.

== I ==
ignore changes

A jazz term used in 1950s and 1960s-era avant-garde and free jazz artists (such as Ornette Coleman) which instructs a soloist to improvise without following the chord changes being used by the rhythm section instruments.

inside

In jazz, to improvise in an "inside" manner means to play within the chords set out in the chord progression and their most closely associated scales. Thus for a several bar section in C^{7}, a performer playing "inside" will use a C^{7} arpeggio and the C mixolydian scale. A performer playing "outside" will use arpeggios and scales that are harmonically distant and thus more dissonant-sounding, such as a D♭ arpeggio and a D♭ major scale. Playing "inside" is more relaxed-sounding. Playing "outside" is more tense and even harsh-sounding. Conductors, bandleaders, or producers may ask performers to play "more inside" for certain songs, sections, or recordings.

intro

Opening section of a song or tune. It can be as short and simple as a single chord (often the I or V^{7} chord) or a two bar turnaround played by a keyboardist or guitarist. On the other hand, an intro can be a four bar, eight bar, or even longer sequence played by the full ensemble which uses one or more key melodic ideas or riffs from the song. The purpose of the intro is to provide the singer with the key, create interest in the listener, and alert listeners that the melody or main theme is about to begin. For instrumental music, an intro may be just the drums, as there is no need to provide the key to the singer.

== J ==
J-Bass

An abbreviation for the Fender Jazz Bass, a widely used brand of electric bass

jam or jam session

In jazz, blues, rock, or related genres, an informal performance of improvised solos over well-known standard compositions (e.g. a blues progression or a jazz standard).

jazz standard or standard

A well-known composition from the jazz repertoire which is widely played and recorded.

== K ==
keyboardist

A musician who plays any instrument with a keyboard. In a jazz or popular music context, this may refer to instruments such as the piano, electric piano, synthesizer, Hammond organ, and so on.

keyboard amp

A combination amplifier designed for keyboard players that contains a two, three, or four-channel mixer, a pre-amplifier for each channel, equalization controls, a power amplifier, a speaker, and a horn, all in a single cabinet. Small keyboard amplifiers designed for small band rehearsals have 50 to 75 watts, a 12-inch speaker, and a horn. Large keyboard amplifiers designed for large clubs or halls have 200 to 300 watts of power, a 15-inch speaker, and a horn.

== L ==
lay out

A jazz term which is the equivalent of the classical term tacet; it instructs the player to cease playing for a section or tune.

lead

In guitar playing, a single-note melody or solo line. In Britain, the term also refers to a patch cable that is used to connect an electric guitar to an amp. (The word is pronounced "leed", not "led".)

lead bass

An expression applied (sometimes derisively) to a style of playing electric bass in which the player adopts a soloistic or melodic "voice", rather than, or in addition to playing the accompaniment role which is normally associated with the bass (e.g. Steve Harris of Iron Maiden).

leading note

The seventh note of a scale, which has a powerful "gravitational pull" toward the eighth note of the scale, which is the "home note" of the key. Because the seventh note of the scale has such a strong pull toward the eighth note, it is deemed to need to "resolve" to the eighth note.

Leslie

A brand name for a rotating speaker cabinet designed for use with the Hammond organ, but also used by some electric guitar players. The rotating horn and rotating baffle around the low-range speaker create an undulating effect.

line

A synonym for "melody" (as in the terms "melodic line"). (See also bassline).

line in

In an audio context, a "line in" is a jack found on mixers, guitar amplifiers, and recording devices. The "line in" jack allows a performer to add an input into a mixer, amplifier, or recording device.

line out

A "line out" jack provides an output signal from an amplifier or other device, which can then be patched into a mixing board, effect unit, PA system, etc.

== M ==
marcato (marc.)'

Marked (i.e. with accentuation, execute every note as if it were to be accented).

master

A finished studio recording, once all the mixing is done and the overall mix is compressed and has audio levels adjusted so they are consistent from song to song, with the songs in the desired order. This process of turning the mixed, finished songs into the master recording is called mastering. Once a recording is mastered, the master recording can be used to make copies. Another meaning is "master volume", a fader on a mixing board that boosts or cuts the volume of the entire mix.

measure

The period of a musical piece that encompasses a complete cycle of the time signature, e.g. in 4/4 time, a measure has four quarter-note beats

mezzo forte

Half loudly (i.e. moderately loudly). See dynamics.

mezzo piano

Half softly (i.e. moderately softly). See dynamics.

Mic

Abbreviation for microphone; the term "mike" is also used.

MIDI

An acronym for musical instrument digital interface, an industry-standard way for electronic devices to communicate information. MIDI five-pin connections and MIDI programming can be used to connect synthesizers, electronic drum machines, sequencers, and so on, even if the equipment is made by different companies. While MIDI systems use cables, they do not transmit sound; instead, a MIDI cable transmits information about the music being played. For example, if a keyboardist plays a middle C note, the MIDI output would transmit a note-on instruction, velocity information (how hard the key was struck), and a note-off (note ending) instruction.

mixdown

The process near the end of the recording process in which all of the tracks of recorded music (e.g. 12, 24, or even 48 tracks of recorded vocals, guitars, keyboards, etc.) are blended and placed onto the Left and Right channels of a standard stereo recording. A "remix" occurs when the same initial tracks are given a new "mixdown", thus blending the tracks in a different way, adding different effects, etc.

monitor

In a live music context, refers to speaker cabinets which are used to amplify the singing and playing of onstage performers so that the performers can hear themselves' in a recording context, refers to studio reference monitors, which are heavy-duty, low-coloration speakers designed for playing back mixes.

monitor mix

In live audio, the monitor mix is the blend of vocal and instrumental channels which is amplified and sent through onstage speakers which are directed toward the performers. The "monitor mix" often differs a great deal from the "front of house" mix. In a typical bar band, the "monitor mix" will consist mainly of vocals, with the possible addition of other instruments that need additional onstage monitoring volume (e.g. harmonica, saxophone, synth).

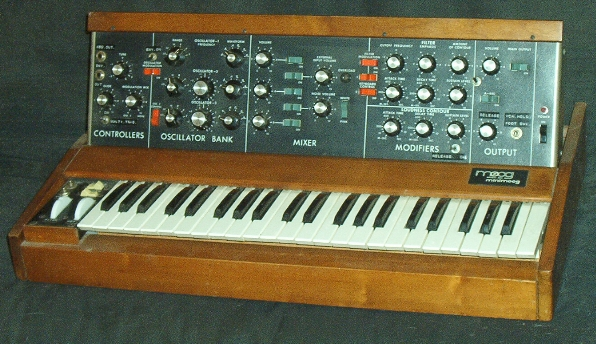
The Minimoog Model D, a Moog synthesizer which was produced from 1971 to 1984.

Moog synthesizer

An early brand of analog synthesizer which was introduced in the late 1960s; Moog synthesizers were still being produced in the 2000s.

== N ==
natural

A symbol (♮) in music notation that cancels the effect of a sharp or a flat (see in this list)

neck

On a guitar (e.g. acoustic guitar, electric guitar, electric bass), violin-family instrument (e.g. violin, upright bass), or other stringed instrument, the neck is the long, thin piece of wood which extends from the soundbox or body of the instrument and upon which the strings are put under tension between the bridge (on a guitar family instrument) or the tailpiece (on a violin-family instrument) and the headstock (for guitars) or the tuning pegs (violin) or machine heads (upright bass). The neck on acoustic and electric guitars and most electric basses has metal frets which divide the neck into semitones. Violin family instruments and fretless electric basses do not have frets.

notch filter

A very precise type of equalizer (e.g. a parametric equalizer) which can be used to boost or cut very narrow frequency ranges. Notch filters are used to lessen feedback with microphones or lessen overly resonant or boomy notes on acoustic guitars.

noodling

Musician's slang, subjective and critical of an instrumentalist playing 'extraneous' parts with no apparent direction or forethought, and carelessly distracting from the intended group focus in an ensemble performance. The term is not strictly applicable across all genres equally, and can be particularly inappropriate when referring to genres where improvisation is central to the musical experience.

note-for-note solo

A live or recorded performance by an instrumentalist that reproduces a previously recorded improvised solo. In some cases, the recreation of the previously recorded solo may be faithful down to the smallest nuances, such as the use of "whammy bar" embellishments and "ghost notes".

== O ==
octave

Interval between one musical pitch and another with half or double its frequency. Octaves can be played one note after the other (e.g. a low C and then a high C), or they can be played together at the same time on instruments such as the guitar, piano, organ, etc. Having the same melody or riff played by two instruments, but an octave apart, is a common arranging device. Octaves of the same note are in the same pitch class, and they may be perceived as the same note by non-professional musicians.

octave pedal

An effects unit that electronically adds a note an octave (or two octaves) below or, less commonly, an octave above the note being played by the performer.

organ trio

In jazz or rock, a group of three musicians which includes a Hammond organ player and two other instruments, often a drummer and either an electric guitar player or a saxophone player. The organ player performs chords and solos on two keyboard manuals with her hands, and plays basslines (or bass pedal points, or just rhythmic downbeats on a single note) with her feet on the pedal keyboard. Even though an organ trio only has three members, it can produce the power and volume of a much larger band, which makes organ trios a good economic choice for bar and club owners who are on a budget.

ostinato

Obstinate, persistent (i.e. a short musical pattern that is repeated throughout an entire composition or portion of a composition). Ostinato basslines or riffs are common in rock music and in some types of jazz. An example is the bassline to "A Night in Tunisia".

outside

In jazz, to improvise in an "outside" manner means to play solo arpeggios and scales that are harmonically distant from the chord being played by the rhythm section and which are thus more dissonant-sounding. For a several bar section where the rhythm section is playing in C^{7} chord, a soloist playing "outside" might play a D♭ arpeggio and a D♭ major scale. Playing "inside" is more relaxed-sounding. Playing "outside" is more tense and even harsh-sounding. Conductors, bandleaders, or producers may ask performers to play "more outside" for certain songs, sections, or recordings.

== P ==
PA system

An abbreviation for public address system (which may be further abbreviated to "the PA"), the term for the speaker cabinets, monitor speakers, amplifiers, and the mixing board used to provide sound for bands in clubs, bars, and similar venues. Sound engineers often use the term "sound reinforcement system", a term that tends to refer more to concert-sized systems rather than pub-sized setups.

P-bass

An abbreviation for the Fender Precision bass, a widely used model of electric bass manufactured by Fender since the mid-1950s

pad

In reference to the music played by a keyboardist, this refers to a "synthesizer pad", which is a sustained background synthesizer sound used to accompany a band or singer (it typically has a slow attack); in arranging and orchestration, a sustained accompaniment for bowed strings may be called a string pad and a similar arrangement for horn section may be called a horn pad; in reference to sound engineering, this refers to an attenuation circuit which reduces the gain of an excessively "hot" signal, typically by 20 dB.

pedal

A stompbox effect unit, a volume pedal, or a similar device.

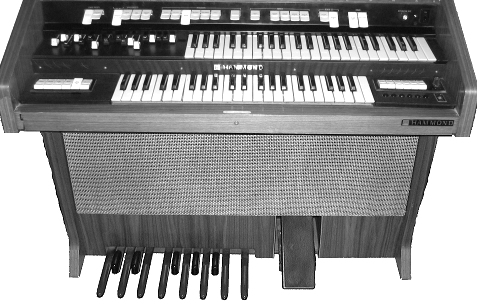
This Hammond spinet organ shows the relatively short pedals and 13-note range used on the pedalboards of spinet organs

pedalboard or pedal keyboard

An organ keyboard played with the feet. A Hammond organ has a bass pedalboard.

pedale (ped)

In piano scores, this instructs the player to press the damper pedal to sustain the note or chord being played. The player may be instructed to release the pedal with an asterisk marking (*).

pedal point

A sustained or repeated note in a song or tune, often in the bass register. The term is a reference to the bass pedal keyboards that are used to sustain a pedal point in organ music. The most common and effective pedal notes are the tonic note (which can be held under the first eight bars of many blues progressions or even the entire 12 bars of some simpler progressions) and the dominant pedal (which can be used under many turnarounds, last four bars of some songs, or even entire B sections). Pedal points create tension and drama when they work well, because dissonance is produced and then resolved.

performance art

An experimental show which combines music, dance, visual effects, and drama (e.g. Laurie Anderson). Associated with some types of art rock and experimental rock.

pianissimo (pp)

Very gently (i.e. perform very softly)

piano (p)

Gently (i.e. played or sung softly). See dynamics.

piano–vocal score

The same as a vocal score, a piano arrangement along with the vocal parts of an opera, cantata, or similar. Piano–vocal scores enable performers to sing works originally scored for singer and large ensemble (orchestra, big band, etc.) with a single pianist.

pickup or pick-up

In reference to an electric guitar or bass, this refers to the magnetic or piezoelectric transducer which transmits the vibrations of the string or the guitar body to an amplifier; in reference to a song or tune, a "pickup" or the "pickup notes" refers to one or several melodic notes which lead into a subsequent section (e.g. a band leader will tell the band to "start from the pickup into the bridge").

pickup group or pickup band

A musical ensemble brought together for a single performance or a few performances.

pizzicato (pizz)

Pinched, plucked (i.e. in music for bowed strings, plucked with the fingers as opposed to played with the bow)

portamento

Sliding in pitch from one note to another.

power chord

A chord consisting of a note, a fifth above, and the octave. It is widely used in rock, metal, hardcore punk, and other genres, usually with overdrive or distortion. Power chords may just be the root and fifth, especially in faster chord sequences.

producer

An individual who directs the recording process through artistic, technical, and organizational decisions and execution. The producer might select session musicians, coach the singers, give direction to the arranger and recording engineer, and generally guide the recording process and schedule. Traditionally a producer was hired or assigned by the record company to insure that the recording was executed as professionally as possible within the time and budget constraints of the project. However, in more recent times, virtually anyone involved in the recording process may be listed as a "producer".

== Q ==
quantize

In digital music processing technology, quantization is the studio-software process of transforming the rhythm of performed musical notes, which may have some imprecision due to expressive performance or rhythm errors, to a musical representation that eliminates the imprecision. The process results in notes being set exactly on beats and on exact fractions of beats.

quarter tone

Half of a semitone; a pitch division not used in most Western music notation, except in some contemporary art music or experimental music. Quarter tones are used in Western popular music forms such as jazz and blues and in a variety of non-Western musical cultures.

== R ==
R&B

Rhythm and blues. A musical style that grew out of Black American blues, boogie-woogie, Gospel, roadhouse piano/guitar duos, and other influences mostly from the Southern United States.

rallentando (rall.)

Progressively slower.

register

Part of the range of an instrument or voice. ("The lower register of the singer's voice was rich and dark").

registration

A setting or combination of stops or voices on an electromechanical organ (e.g. Hammond organ) or an electronic or "combo organ".

reggae

A Jamaican style of popular music that features a strong, syncopated bassline, accompaniment with an undistorted electric guitar or Fender Rhodes on the offbeats, and chanted vocals.

remix

A second or subsequent "mixdown" of a set of recorded tracks. (see "mixdown").

reverb

The echoing sound that occurs naturally to a voice or instrument in hall or room with reflective walls and, by extension, to analog or digital effect units which recreate this effect (reverb units).

Rhodes

The Fender Rhodes brand of electric piano and, by extension similar instruments produced by other manufacturers.

rig

In a live music context, this is a slang term used by musicians to refer to the audio processing and amplification gear used by a keyboardist, bassist, or electric guitarist. An electric bassist, for example, may refer to her speaker cabinet, bass amplifier "head", and rack-mounted effects units collectively as her "rig" (or "bass rig").

rit.

An abbreviation for ritardando; also an abbreviation for ritenuto

ritardando (ritard., rit.)

Slowing down; decelerating; opposite of accelerando

RMS

An acronym for "root means square", a way of measuring the power-handling capacity of a loudspeaker or tweeter in watts. The RMS rating printed on the back of a speaker indicates the average power that the speaker can handle.

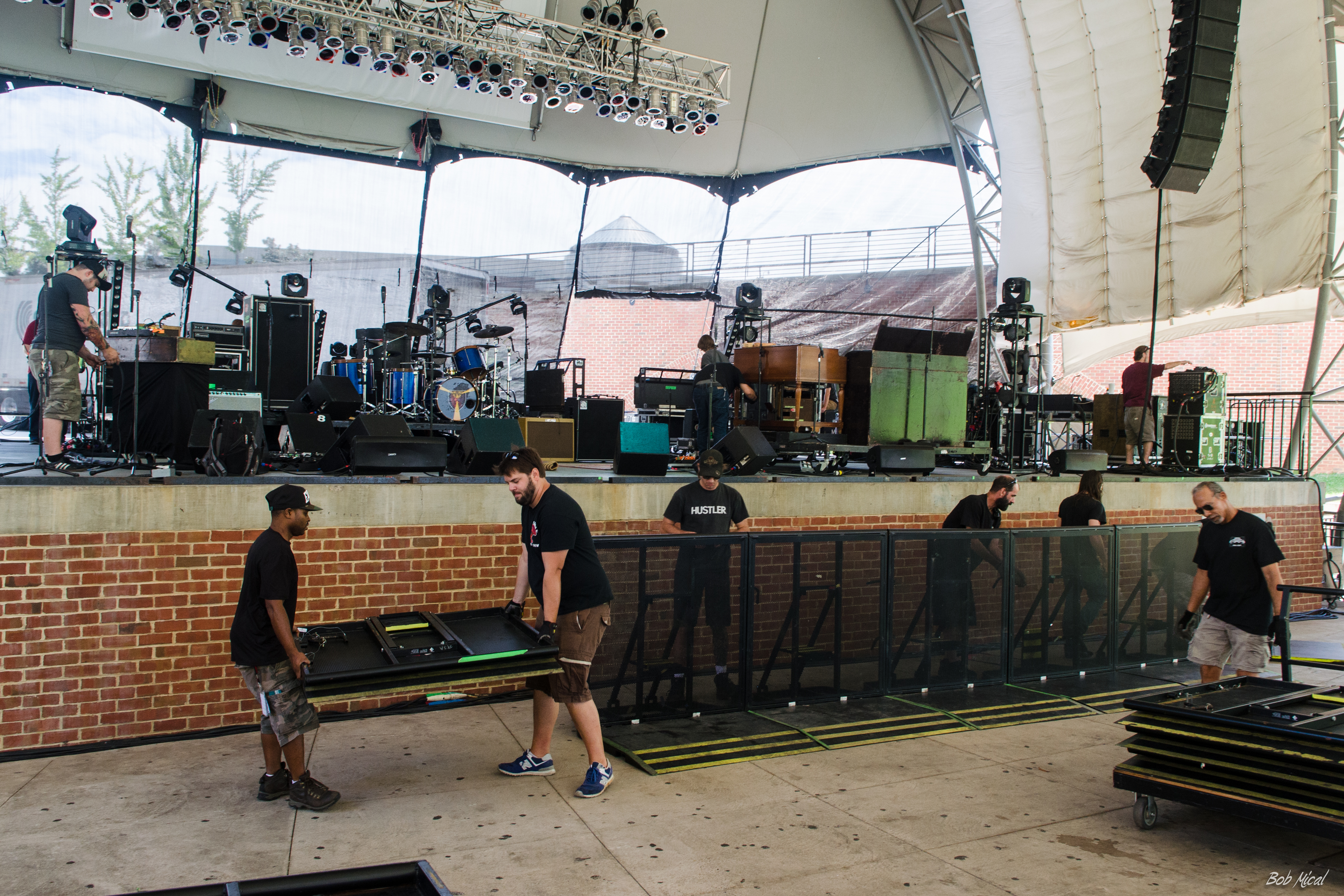
A team of roadies carries music gear, sets up equipment, and readies the stage for the band's show.

roadie

A slang term which refers to the road crew, the employees of a musical group's touring team. They include a range of technicians, tradespeople, support personnel, and managers. They load and unload musical equipment, set up and tune the musical instruments (guitar tech) and sound system, provide management and security, and operate sound (audio engineer) and lighting gear.

Roland

A Japanese musical instrument and audio equipment company that produces electronic keyboards, guitar amplifiers, effects units, and other equipment.

rolled chord

A chord in which the notes of the chord are played one after the other, which each note being sustained.

rushing

The undesirable act of playing too fast in relation to the existing tempo when no accelerando is called for. Not to be confused with playing "on top" of the beat. It is the opposite of "dragging".

== S ==
sample or sampling

To record a short portion from a live performance or from a recording of an instrument or group, so that this short "snippet" can be re-played or re-used in another performance or recording. In the 2000s, sampling is usually done by making a digital recording of the desired sample. Sampling is widely used in 2000s-era pop, hip-hop, and electronica.

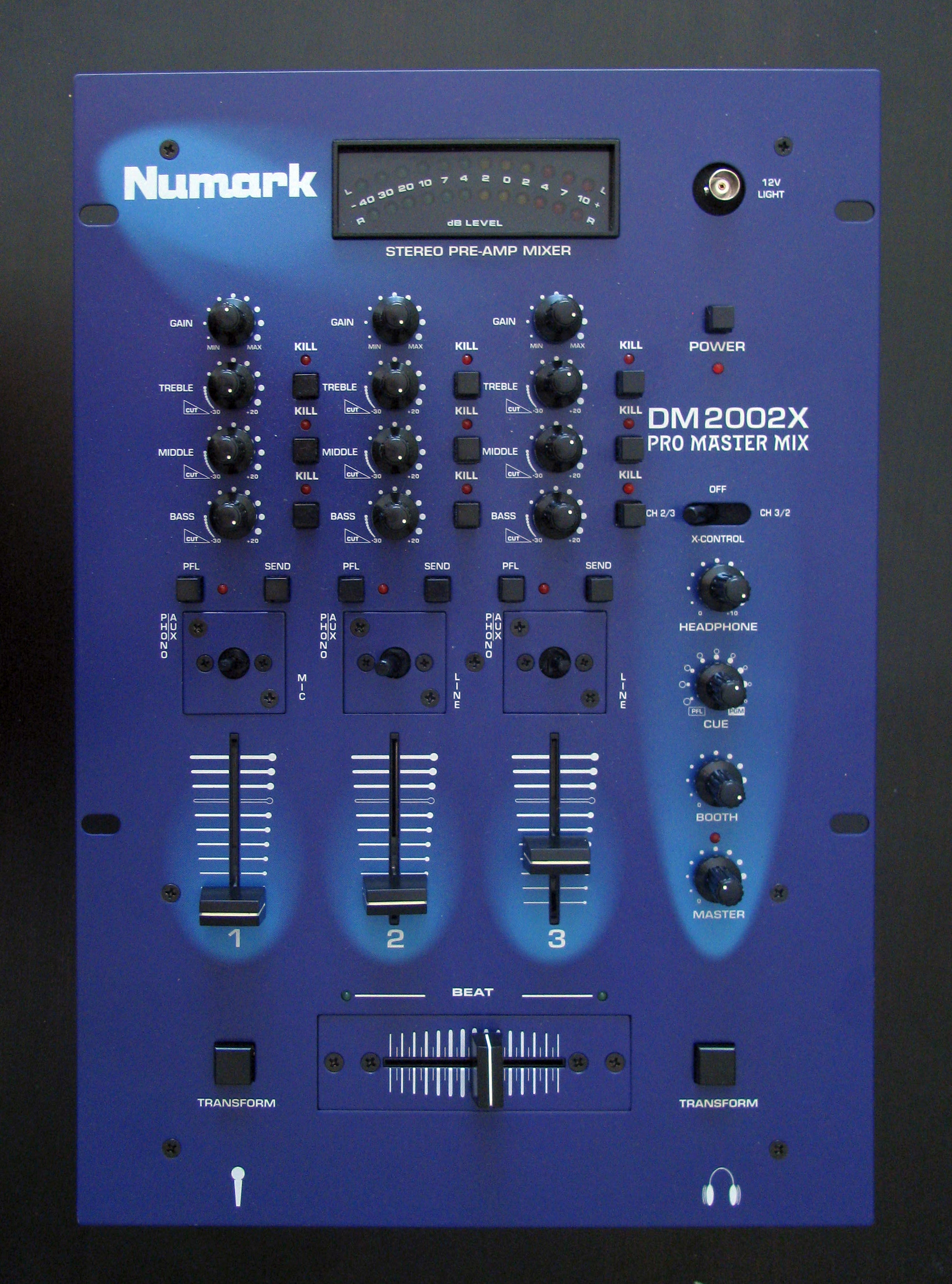
A Numark DM2002X Pro Master DJ mixer, which can be used for mixing records or scratching.

scratch

In a recording context, this refers to a rough "scratch track", which is the recording of a rhythm section part or vocals which is done to provide a temporary reference point for the performers who will be recording their parts (the "scratch track" is erased later on; in the context of hip-hop music and turntablism, "scratching" refers to the manipulation of a vinyl record on a turntable with the hands and a DJ mixer to create rhythmic sounds.

segue

Carry on to the next section of music without a pause.

semitone

The smallest pitch difference between notes (in most Western music) (e.g. F–F♯). Jazz, blues, and various non-Western musics use quarter tones, a smaller subdivision of pitch.

session musician, session player, or session man

In jazz and popular music, this refers to a highly skilled, experienced musician who can be hired for recording sessions. Session musicians are generally paid just for their time in the studio, which means they do not get paid more if the album they play on hits number one in sales.

shake

A jazz term for a trill between one note and its minor third; or, with brass instruments, between a note and its next overblown harmonic.

sharp

A symbol (♯) that raises the pitch of the note by a semitone. The term may also be used as an adjective to describe a situation where a singer or musician is performing a note in which the intonation is an eighth or a quarter of a semitone too high in pitch.

shred

An adjective that is mainly used in connection to the electric guitar (or less commonly, to other stringed instruments such as banjo or electric bass); it describes intense, virtuosic, rapid playing of the instrument (e.g. "shred guitar"). It can also be used as a verb (e.g. "to shred").

sidefills

A slang term for onstage monitor speakers that are placed on the sides of the stage, to help performers to hear themselves.

sideman or sidemen

Musicians in a band who accompany a lead singer, bandleader, or lead instrumentalist.

sibilance

The "hissing" sounds that occur when words with the letter "s" are sung; when vocals are sung into a microphone, the "s" sounds can be picked up excessively by the mic. Excessive sibilance is prevented by using a pop screen or a compressor-triggered equalizer.

sign

Another name for a symbol (called "segno" in Classical parlance) in written music scores. The score may instruct the band to jump from one section back to the part of the music marked with the sign.

sit in

In jazz and blues, to "sit in" is to be invited to perform onstage along with another group for one or several songs, often to perform improvised solos. Even though a person who sits in with a band plays on stage with the band, they are not an official member of the band.

skins

A term, now archaic, originating from jazz musicians referring specifically a set of drums (kick, snare, toms, hi-hat, etc.)

slapping or slap bass

In reference to the electric bass, this term refers to a percussive, funky style of playing in which the low strings are slapped and the high strings are popped, used in funk, Latin, and pop. In reference to the upright bass, "slap bass" refers to a percussive style of playing in which the player strikes the strings against the fingerboard to create a percussive, rhythmic effect (used in traditional blues, rockabilly, and bluegrass).

snake

A slang term which refers to a thick audio multicore cable that terminates in a patchbay; it is used to route the signals of all of the onstage microphones and instrument amplifiers to the mixing board at the back of the performance venue.

solid-state

An electrical circuit that uses transistors and other silicon semiconductors to manipulate current levels as contrasted with vacuum tubes. Solid state amplifiers are less heavy, less expensive, and easier to maintain than tube amplifiers. However, there are differences in tone and response between solid-state and tube amps.

solo break

A jazz term that instructs a lead player or rhythm section member to play an improvised solo cadenza for one or two measures (sometimes abbreviated as "break"), without any accompaniment. The solo part is often played in a rhythmically free manner, until the player performs a pickup or lead-in line, at which time the band recommences playing in the original tempo. See break in this list.

solo

Alone (i.e. executed by a single instrument or voice). A solo may be written down, as with Classical solos, or improvised, as with jazz and blues solos.

soli

Plural for solo; requires more than one player or singer; in a jazz big band this refers to an entire section playing in harmony (e.g. a sax section soli).

soprano

The highest of the standard four voice ranges (bass, tenor, alto, soprano)

standard tuning

For acoustic and electric guitar, the standard tuning is E–A–D–G–B–E (from lowest string to highest). For the electric bass, the standard tuning is E–A–D–G. Altered tunings are used to obtain lower notes (e.g. drop D tuning, in which the low E string is lowered to a D), facilitate the playing of slide guitar, or to allow the playing of "open" chords that are not possible in standard tuning.

stompbox

A slang term which refers to a small, portable effect unit that has an integrated on-off footswitch (e.g. a distortion pedal).

stage piano

A high-quality, heavy-duty electric piano or digital piano designed for touring or installation in a commercial performance venue (e.g. a piano bar). Unlike synthesizer-style keyboards, a stage piano typically has weighted or semi-weighted keys, which give more of the feel of an acoustic piano. Some 2000s-era stage pianos include Hammond organ and clavichord voices in addition to piano and electric piano sounds.

Stratocaster or Strat

An electric guitar manufactured by Fender, which is widely used in rock and other popular music.

Surf Ballroom

The venue in Clear Lake, Iowa, where Buddy Holly, J. P. Richardson ("The Big Bopper") and Ritchie Valens played their last performances on 2 February 1959. They lost their lives in a plane crash following the performance at the "Winter Dance Party". The tragic loss is known as "The Day The Music Died".

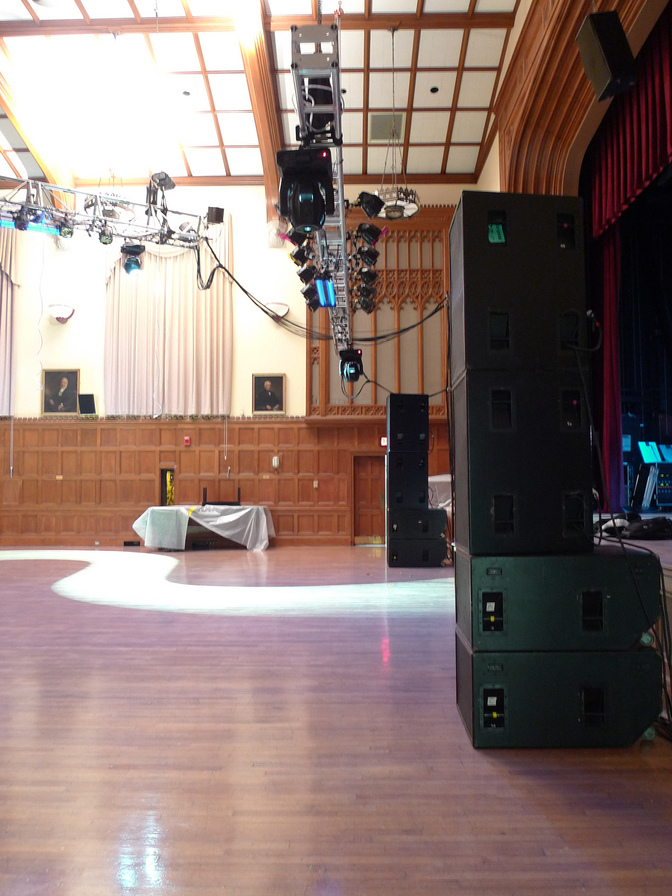
A sound reinforcement setup with subwoofers for the bass range (the cabinets on the floor) and full range cabinets for the mid and high frequencies (stacked on top).

subwoofer (sub)

A speaker cabinet with a woofer that is designed for the reproduction of low-frequency sounds from about 20 Hz to 200 Hz. Subs are used in PA systems and studio monitor systems. Subwoofers used for PA systems typically use large diameter woofers (18 or 21 inches) mounted in large wooden cabinets. Studio monitor subs tend to use smaller cabinets and smaller-diameter woofers (10", 12", or 15"), because the goal with studio monitors is high fidelity, not massive sound pressure output.

sweetening

A recording production term for additional instruments or voices—orchestral bowed strings, vocal harmonies from a group of professional backup singers, Latin percussionists, etc.– to a basic "bed track" or "basic track" of bass, drums, and rhythm guitar or piano. Widely used in the 1970s in soft rock and disco. See the related concept ear candy in this list.

sweet spot

In live sound or recordings in which a microphone is placed in front of an instrument or a guitar amplifier, the "sweet spot" is a placement or position of a microphone which yields the most pleasing sound; in the context of listening to a mix in a studio through monitor speakers, the "sweet spot" is a distance away from the speakers that the engineer believes to produce the most natural sound.

syncopation

A disturbance or interruption of the regular flow of rhythm often consisting of playing off of the main beat (i.e. playing on the "and" of every beat in a measure instead of on the beat) or emphasizing a beat other than the main beat. Syncopation is widely used in Latin music.

== T ==
tablature (tab)

For guitar, bass guitar, and other fretted stringed instruments, tab is a type of sheet music notation in which the strings of the instrument are depicted on paper using staff paper-like lines, and then the pitches to be played are indicated using a fret number on the appropriate string line.

tacet

Silent, a notation in a part meaning "do not play in this section". By marking "tacet", the arranger does not need to write out the bars of rest, which saves the arranger time and effort.

take

In a recording session, a period of playing or singing which is recorded is called a "take".

tech

A technician or repairperson who tours with a band or group, and whose duties include setting up, maintaining, and repairing musical instruments and related accessories; different types include a "drum tech"; "bass tech", and a "guitar tech".

Tele or Telecaster

A solid body electric guitar manufactured by Fender since mid-1950 and preceded by the Broadcaster. Widely employed in both country music and rock for its bright tone and percussive attack.

tempo

Time (i.e. the overall speed of a piece of music)

tenor

The second-lowest of the standard four voice ranges (bass, tenor, alto, soprano). May refer to a tenor sax.

ticky tack

A medium- or high-pitched single note electric guitar figure, usually muted by some method or device to achieve a short and percussive note. A clean amp tone is most useful for the effect. It is most commonly heard in reggae, ska, rock steady, funk, R&B, and soul.

tight sound

A recording of an instrument (e.g. drums) which uses very close miking done in a soundproof recording room to eliminate "bleeding" from other instruments or ambient background noise.

timbre

The quality of a musical tone that distinguishes different voices, instruments, amplifiers, and effects

time

In a jazz or rock score, after a rubato or rallentando section, the term "time" indicates that performers should return to tempo (this is equivalent to the term "a tempo").

track

A synonym often used interchangeably in reference to various nouns in music, including the sector on a CD containing a block of data, an audio channel (often a "backing track", or "background track"), and even the song itself.

trainwreck or train wreck

A major error occurring within a musical performance typically resulting in complete stoppage of the piece. It is often due to an incorrect or missed cue, or otherwise collectively becoming hopelessly lost within an arrangement resulting in a "train wreck" by the entire ensemble.

transcription or note-for-note solo

When a performer copies every note of a previously recorded solo, this is called a "transcription" or a "note-for-note solo".

tribute band

A group which plays cover songs from a single famous band, with the show serving as a tribute to this band. Tribute bands' names may be puns or wordplays that clearly show the famous band they are based on (e.g., Zed Leppelin could be the name for a Led Zeppelin tribute group).

tremolo

Shaking (i.e. a rapid repetition of the same note, or an alternation between two or more notes). It can also be intended (inaccurately) to refer to vibrato, which is a slight undulation in pitch. It is notated by a strong diagonal bar across the note stem, or a detached bar for a set of notes (or stemless notes).

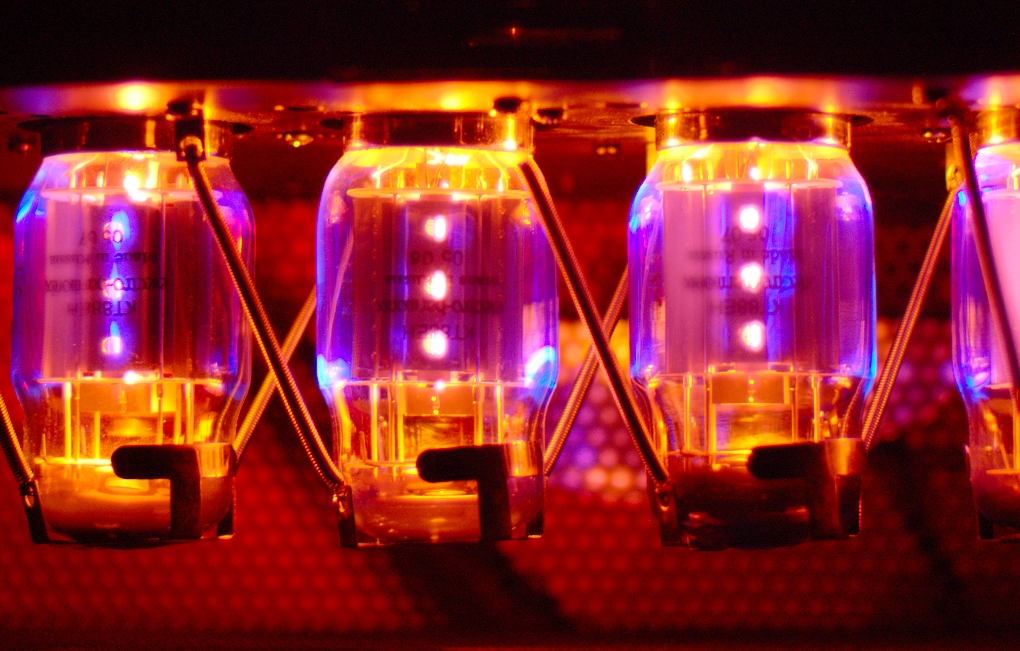
The glow from four KT88 model "Electro Harmonix" brand power tubes lights up the inside of a Traynor YBA-200 guitar amplifier

tube amplifier or valve amplifier

A power amplifier which is based on vacuum tubes. Tube amps produce soft clipping with a natural compression, and they are widely used in electric guitar and electric bass amps, and in Leslie-type amplifiers that amplify Hammond organs.

tubs

A term, now archaic, originating from jazz musicians referring specifically a set of drums (kick, snare, toms, hi-hat etc.)

tuner

May refer to an electronic tuner, which is a digital or analog device that assists musicians to tune their instruments; or it may refer to a piano technician who tunes pianos or other keyboard instruments.

turnaround

A two bar sequence at the end of a blues progression, rhythm changes progression, or other forms, notably 32-bar AABA jazz song forms, which signals to the listeners and performers that the song ending or subsection ending has been reached, and as such, the song will repeat again from the beginning. A classic turnaround is I–vi–ii–V^{7} (C–Am–Dm–G^{7} in the key of C) or its close cousin, I–VI^{7}–ii–V^{7} (C–A^{7}–Dm–G^{7} in the key of C). A simple blues progression might just use I–V^{7}. A bebop blues by Charlie Parker might use chromatic chords that extrapolate from I–VI^{7}–ii–V^{7}, to give turnarounds such as I–♭III^{7}–ii–♭II^{7} (C–E♭^{7}–Dm–D♭^{7} in the key of C, an approach in which A^{7} and G^{7} were tritone substituted).

== U ==
unison

Several players in a group are to play exactly the same notes within their written part, as opposed to splitting simultaneous notes among themselves.

utility player

A multi-instrumentalist playing two or more instruments and perhaps singing during live performances. Utility players are often hired to help touring musical acts fill out the "stage" arrangements to better match the recorded versions without having to hire several individuals to perform parts played on various instruments.

== V ==
vamp

A short, simple chord sequence, often two chords (e.g., D minor to G^{7} for a song in C major) which is repeated to fill in time. Another popular vamp is I–VI–ii–V, which in the key of C major is C–A^{7}–Dm–G^{7}.

vamp till cue

A jazz, fusion, and musical theater term which instructs rhythm section members to repeat and vary a short chord progression, ostinato passage, riff, or "groove" until the band leader or conductor instructs them to move onto the next section

vanity record

Analogous to a vanity press book, which a person pays to have produced, a vanity record is financed by the musical performer.

'verb

Short for "reverb" which typically refers to the electronic reverb effect.

virtuoso

(noun or adjective) performing with exceptional ability, technique, or artistry

vocal score or piano–vocal score

A music score of a musical theater show or a vocal or choral composition where the vocal parts are written out in full but the accompaniment is reduced to two staves and adapted for playing on piano

voicing

The choice of, and order of notes in the playing of a chord, which creates a different sound. For example, a C^{Maj7} chord played with the voicing "C, E, G, B" (letter names refer to individual pitches that make up the chord) is often considered to sound more "open" than a voicing where the chord is inverted so that some of the chord tones are very close in pitch (e.g. B, C, E, G). Another way that players may "voice" the same type of chord differently is by adding tones. For example, if a lead sheet shows the chord C^{Maj7}, some guitarists might play "E, A, D", a voicing which is "open" (insofar as it consists of large intervals) and which contains two "colour" tones, namely the sixth ("A") and the ninth ("D") of the chord.

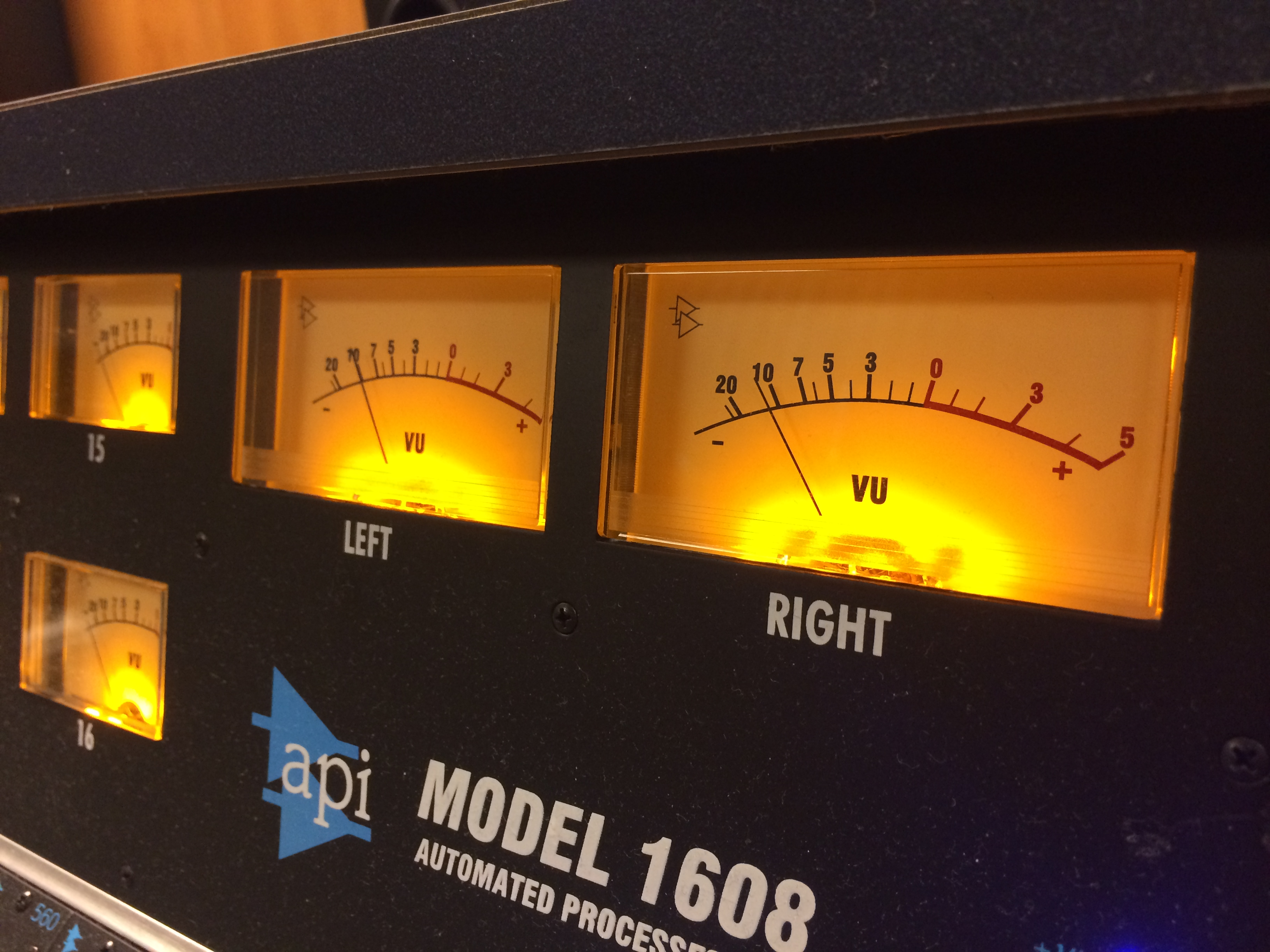
VU meters on an API recording console.

VU meter

An abbreviation for "Volume Unit" meter; a sound level metering approach that measures the average sound levels. Commonly used in LED and needle indicators on mixing boards, sound processors, and other electronic gear.

== W ==
wah-wah pedal

A guitar effect unit mounted in a rocking treadle which, when moved up and down with the foot, applies a frequency filter that mimics some aspects of the human voice. May also be used with keyboards, electric violin, or other instruments. Very popular in the 1970s.

walking bass

A bass part which moves steadily under a chord or chord progression with a scalar or arpeggiated pattern (typically based on quarter or eighth notes) moving up or down, or up and down repetitively so as to create a sense of "walking". It often employs passing tones leading to the next chord change. The approach can drive the beat/groove effortlessly, create motion, and thus interest within an otherwise static progression. It is often heard in swing, bebop, and more predictably within early Rock & Roll, Rockabilly, and occasionally in Ska. Also it is heard within more challenging music, e.g. John Coltrane-era compositions using more complex chord changes and time signatures.

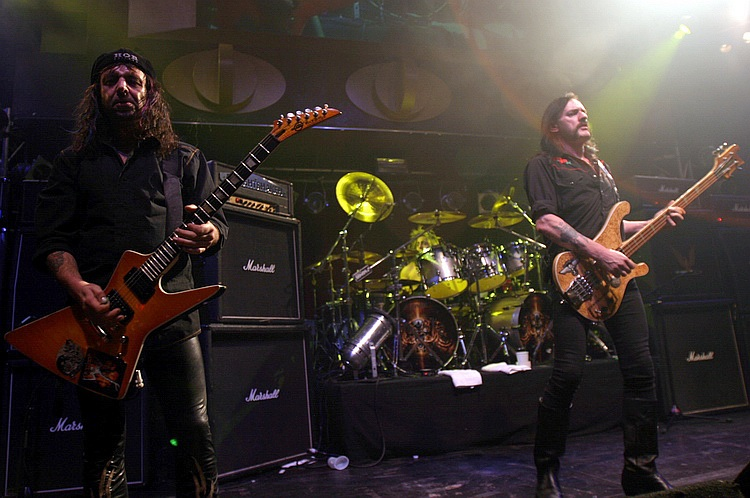
Motörhead are known for the powerful "wall of sound" created by the big stacks of powerful amplifiers

wall of sound

In a recording context, refers to a production technique which creates a fuller, richer sound by having each part played by a number of instruments and routing the sound through an echo chamber. The American record producer Phil Spector is considered to be the originator of this recording approach and thus almost exclusively associated with the phrase beginning in the early 1960's. In a live concert context, refers to the massive volume created by huge stacks of powerful, distorted guitar amplifiers at a heavy metal concert (e.g. Motörhead)

weekend warrior

An amateur or semi-professional musician who plays gigs on their off-hours while working a job outside of music. The term may be used derisively or fairly neutrally.

whammy bar

An accessory on an electric guitar that can be used to bend down the pitch of an individual note or a chord (also referred to as a "tremolo bar").

woodshed

A slang term (also referred to as 'Shedding') which refers to an intense period of practice and self-development that a musician has (or is believed to have) undergone. If a musician has dramatically improved their technique in a short period, a critic may state that the performer has "woodshedded" on technique.

== X ==
XLR

A type of professional audio cable used to send balanced signals. Microphone cables have three pins in the connector. More rarely, five-pin XLR cables are used (e.g. for DMX). XLR cables are sometimes called "Cannon connectors", a reference to the first manufacturer of these cables.

== Y ==
Y-cable or Y-cord

A cable with three ends, whereby one plug is joined to two plugs. This allows a single signal output to be plugged into two devices. For example, an electric guitarist could plug a single guitar into two guitar amps to create an unusual tone colour. Y-cables are also used to plug inserts into mixing boards (e.g. a compressor or reverb unit).

== Z ==
Z

An abbreviation for impedance, as seen in the terms High-Z (high impedance) and Low-Z (low impedance), which refer to speakers, microphones, cables, etc. Impedance, which is the electrical resistance of a device, is measured in Ohms.

zeppelin

Slang term for a shock-mounted microphone covered in a puffy foam padding. The elastic shock mount reduces the transmission of stage noise (e.g., footsteps or foot tapping) to the microphone. The foam acts as a windscreen, and reduces wind noise for outdoor recordings. May also be called a "blimp".

zither

A stringed instrument with a soundbox which is used in traditional European folk music.

Zydeco

A style of music from Louisiana which blends Creole, Cajun, and African-American blues and jazz, typically using accordion, washboard percussion, guitar, and bass.

== See also ==
- Glossary of music terminology
- Glossary of Schenkerian analysis
- List of musical symbols
