= Subornation of perjury =

Permitting someone to purposefully lie in court

In American law, Scots law, and under the laws of some English-speaking Commonwealth nations, subornation of perjury is the crime of persuading or permitting a person to commit perjury, which is the swearing of a false oath to tell the truth in a legal proceeding, whether spoken or written.

== U.S. Law ==
In American federal law, Title 18 U.S.C. § 1622 provides:

Whoever procures another to commit any perjury is guilty of subornation of perjury, and shall be fined under this title or imprisoned not more than five years, or both.

The term subornation of perjury further describes the circumstance wherein an attorney at law causes a client to lie under oath or, allows another party to lie under oath.

In California law, per the state bar code, the subornation of perjury constitutes an act of "moral turpitude" on the part of the attorney, and thus, is cause for their disbarment, or for the suspension of their license to practice law.

== In legal practice ==
As a crime, it has been defined as "persuading another to commit perjury."

But "suborn" is more broadly defined. Amongst three definitions: to induce a person to commit a wrongful act ... esp. in a secret or underhanded manner; to induce a person to commit perjury; and to obtain perjured testimony from another.

In legal practice, the condition of suborning perjury applies to an attorney who presents either testimony or an affidavit, or both, either to a judge or to a jury, which the attorney knows to be materially false, and not factual. In civil law and in criminal law, the attorney's knowledge that the testimony is materially false must rise above mere suspicion to what an attorney would reasonably have believed in the circumstances of the matter discussed in the testimony. Hence, the attorney cannot be wilfully blind to the fact that their witness is giving false, perjurious testimony.

An attorney who encourages a witness to give false testimony is suborning perjury, a crime punished either with formal disciplinary action, disbarment, jail, or a combination thereof. A false statement by an attorney in court also is a crime similar to subornation of perjury and is punished accordingly. In the professional conduct of an attorney at law, there is a fine delineation between assisting a witness to recall events and encouraging the witness to give materially false testimony. The practice of ″horse shedding the witness″ (rehearsing testimony) (also known as woodshedding), is an example of such perjurious criminal conduct by an attorney, which is depicted in the true-crime novel Anatomy of a Murder (1958), by Robert Traver – John D. Voelker, a justice of the Michigan Supreme Court – and in the eponymous film (Otto Preminger, 1959), about a rape-and-murder case wherein are explored the ethical and legal problems inherent to the subornation of perjury.

== See also ==
- Jury tampering
- Oath of office
- Sworn testimony
- Fraud
- Bribery
