= Weekend warrior =

A weekend warrior is someone who engages in sports or outdoor pursuits on the weekend.

Weekend warrior may also refer to:

== Music ==
- Weekend Warrior (album), an album by Biz Markie in 2003
- Weekend Warriors (album), an album by Ted Nugent in 1978
- "Weekend Warrior", a song by Iron Maiden from Fear of the Dark in 1992
- "Weekend Warrior", a song by Ministry from Relapse in 2012
- "Weekend Warriors", a song by Uriah Heep from Head First in 1983
- "Weekend Warriors", a song by A Change Of Pace from Prepare the Masses in 2006

== Other media ==
- Weekend Warrior, a computer game developed by Pangea Software
- Weekend Warriors (1986 film), a comedy
- Weekend Warriors (upcoming film), an American sports comedy-drama film
- "Weekend Warriors" (Psych), an episode of the TV series Psych
- Weekend Warriors, a program broadcase by HGTV Canada
- Weekend Warriors MMA, a mobile game developed by MDickie

== Other uses ==
- A nickname for the visitors of the Defqon.1 Festival
- An Army National Guardsman who drills one weekend a month.
