= Overhead microphone =

Microphone placement technique

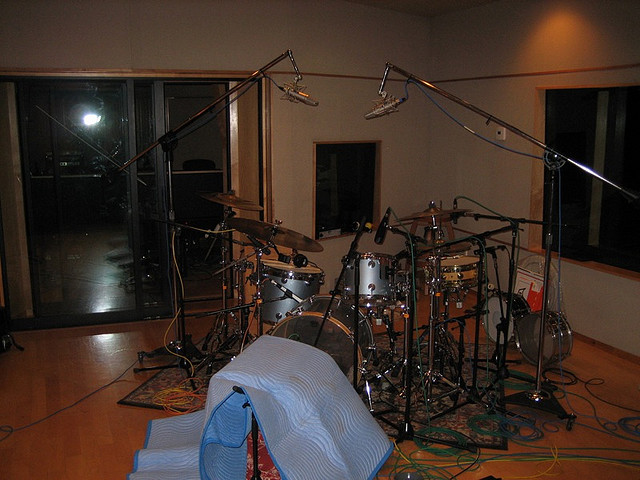
This photograph of a drum kit shows the overhead microphones in a "spaced pair" arrangement

Drum recording using just overhead microphones
On this recording of a drum kit, the overhead microphones provide a clear stereo image of the kit as a whole

Drum recording using microphones on each drum, but no overhead microphones
On this recording of a drum kit, the lack of overhead microphones leaves the recording without much ambience, as the sound is only provided by the close microphones

A full drum kit recording
On this recording of a drum kit, overhead microphones are balanced with the close microphones to blend the stereo sound of the kit and ambience together

Overhead microphones are those used in sound recording and live sound reproduction to pick up ambient sounds, transients and the overall blend of instruments. They are used in drum recording to achieve a stereo image of the full drum kit, as well as orchestral recording to create a balanced stereo recording of full orchestras.

== Overhead positioning ==
There are multiple arrangements for drum overheads, which are often based on personal preference of the musician, engineer, or producer. These include "A-B" spaced pairs (where two directional microphones are suspended above the left and right clusters of cymbals), "X-Y" coincident pairs, where the two directional microphones are centred on the drum kit with their capsule are very close without touching, and angled across each other at 90°. Coincident placement give a wider stereo image than spaced pairs, and some engineers prefer it for this reason.

Other drum overhead positions include the Recorderman Technique (where the distance between both microphones and the snare drum is equal, as is the distance between both microphones and the bass drum) and the Glyn Johns method (where one "overhead" is placed to the drummer's right, aiming across the floor tom to the centre of the kit).

In orchestral recordings, particularly those for film score recordings, the Decca tree is often used.

== Sources ==
- Bartlett, Bruce (2006), Stereo Microphone Techniques, Guasti, CA: Delta Media
- Eargle, John (2004), The Microphone Book, Kidlington, Oxfordshire: Focal Press, ISBN 0-240-51961-2
- Griffiths, Ed (2007), The Glyn Johns Method – A Quick Primer for Recording Drums (PDF), Blaxploitation
- Huber, David Miles (2005), Modern Recording Techniques (6th ed.), Kidlington, Oxfordshire: Focal Press, ISBN 0-240-80625-5
- McKinney, Des (2007), Recorderman Overhead Drum Mic Technique, Toronto: Hometracked
- Streicher, Ron (2003), The Decca Tree – It's Not Just for Stereo Any More (PDF), Pasadena, CA: Audio Engineering Associates, archived from the original (PDF) on 19 July 2011
