= Canadian Screen Award for Best Reality/Competition Series =

Annual Canadian television award

The Canadian Screen Award for Best Reality/Competition Series is an annual Canadian television award, presented by the Academy of Canadian Cinema and Television to the best Canadian reality television series. Previously presented as part of the Gemini Awards, since 2013 it has been presented as part of the Canadian Screen Awards.

The award was originally presented as Best Reality Program or Series, and did not necessarily require nominated or winning shows to be competitive in nature. As other awards were introduced for categories such as lifestyle, factual and history programming, the reality category's focus narrowed in more strongly on competition shows.

== 2000s ==
| Year | Program | Producers | Network | Ref |
|---|---|---|---|---|
2003; 18th Gemini Awards
| 2003; 18th Gemini Awards | Cirque du Soleil: Fire Within | Marie Côté, Vincent Gagné, Arnie Gelbart | Global | |
| 2003; 18th Gemini Awards | eLove | Cesca Barton, Andre Barro | W Network | |
| 2003; 18th Gemini Awards | Matchmaker | Andrea Gorfolova | Life Network | |
| 2003; 18th Gemini Awards | Popstars: The One | Maria Pimentel, Michael Geddes | Global | |
2004; 19th Gemini Awards
| 2004; 19th Gemini Awards | CBC News: Disclosure: "The Making of a Political Animal" | Catherine Legge, Jane Mingay, Cecil Rosner, Jim Williamson | CBC | |
| 2004; 19th Gemini Awards | Buy Me | Nikila Cole, Hans Rosenstein | HGTV | |
| 2004; 19th Gemini Awards | Hooked Up | Michael Geddes, Michael Frislev, Chad Oakes, Maria Pimentel, Tom Powers | Toronto 1 | |
| 2004; 19th Gemini Awards | Kenny vs. Spenny | Abby Finer, Noreen Halpern, Kenny Hotz, Ira Levy, John Morayniss, Spencer Rice, Kirsten Scollie, Peter Williamson | CBC | |
| 2004; 19th Gemini Awards | Venture: "Back to the Floor" | Patsy Pehleman, Chad Paulin, Tracie Tighe | CBC | |
| 2004; 19th Gemini Awards | Zoo Diaries | Garry Blye, Howard Bernstein, Mark Shekter | Life Network | |
2005; 20th Gemini Awards
| 2005; 20th Gemini Awards | Venture: "The Town Doctor" | Patsy Pehleman, Tracie Tighe | CBC | |
| 2005; 20th Gemini Awards | Buy Me | Hans Rosenstein, Debbie Travis, Jean-François Monette | HGTV | |
| 2005; 20th Gemini Awards | Made to Order | Michael Rubino, Henry Less | Food Network (Corus) | |
2006; 21st Gemini Awards
| 2006; 21st Gemini Awards | MuchMusic VJ Search | Andrea Gabourie, Barbara Bowlby, John Brunton | MuchMusic | |
| 2006; 21st Gemini Awards | Bomber Boys: The Fighting Lancaster | Jamie Brown | History | |
| 2006; 21st Gemini Awards | From the Ground Up with Debbie Travis | Hans Rosenstein, Debbie Travis, Kit Redmond | Global | |
| 2006; 21st Gemini Awards | The Next Great Chef | Edi Osghian, Andy Levine, Nick Versteeg | Global | |
| 2006; 21st Gemini Awards | Venture: "The Big Switcheroo: Boston Pizza" | Tracie Tighe, Dianne Buckner | CBC | |
2007; 22nd Gemini Awards
| 2007; 22nd Gemini Awards | Canada's Next Top Model | Ivan Schneeberg, David Fortier, Sheila Hockin, Ron Carroll | Citytv | |
| 2007; 22nd Gemini Awards | 5 Seekers | Allan Novak, Joan Jenkinson, Ralph Benmergui | VisionTV | |
| 2007; 22nd Gemini Awards | Design Interns | Maria Pimentel, Joseph Blasioli | HGTV | |
| 2007; 22nd Gemini Awards | Dragons' Den | Mike Downie, Tracie Tighe, Stuart Coxe | CBC | |
| 2007; 22nd Gemini Awards | The Next Great Chef | Edi Osghian, Giuliana Bertuzzi, Nick Versteeg | Global | |
2008; 23rd Gemini Awards
| 2008; 23rd Gemini Awards | Project Runway Canada | John Brunton, Barbara Bowlby, Sheila Hockin | Slice | |
| 2008; 23rd Gemini Awards | Canada's Next Top Model | Sheila Hockin, Brad Brough, David Fortier, Jay Manuel, Ivan Schneeberg | Citytv | |
| 2008; 23rd Gemini Awards | Dragons' Den | Stuart Coxe, Catherine Annau, Lisa Gabriele, Tracie Tighe | CBC | |
| 2008; 23rd Gemini Awards | Triple Sensation | Garth Drabinsky, Sandra Cunningham, Sari Friedland, Alex Ganetakos | CBC | |
| 2008; 23rd Gemini Awards | The Week the Women Went | Cal Shumiatcher, Trevor Hodgson, Sally Aitken, David Paperny | CBC | |
2009; 24th Gemini Awards
| 2009; 24th Gemini Awards | Dragons' Den | Stuart Coxe, Tracie Tighe, Lisa Gabriele | CBC | |
| 2009; 24th Gemini Awards | disBAND: The Homecoming | John Kampilis, Chris Barrow, Mark Myers, Jason Ford | MuchMusic | |
| 2009; 24th Gemini Awards | GoldMind | Mary Darling, Kim E. Brouwer, Clark Donnelly | TVtropolis | |
| 2009; 24th Gemini Awards | Project Runway Canada | Andrea Gabourie, Barbara Bowlby, John Brunton | Global | |
| 2009; 24th Gemini Awards | The Week the Women Went | Ed Hatton, David Paperny, Cal Shumiatcher, Peter Waal, Trevor Hodgson, Brad Brough | CBC | |

== 2010s ==
| Year | Program | Producers | Network | Ref |
|---|---|---|---|---|
2010; 25th Gemini Awards
| 2010; 25th Gemini Awards | The Cupcake Girls | Peter Waal, Gillian Lowrey, John Ritchie, Grant Greschuk, Rob Bromley | W Network | |
| 2010; 25th Gemini Awards | Canada's Next Top Model | Brad Brough, Sheila Hockin, Jay Manuel, Ivan Schneeberg, David Fortier, Lena Cordina | CTV | |
| 2010; 25th Gemini Awards | Dragons' Den | Tracie Tighe, Mike Armitage, Lisa Gabriele | CBC | |
| 2010; 25th Gemini Awards | Love It or List It | Catherine Fogarty, Maria Armstrong | W Network | |
2011; 26th Gemini Awards
| 2011; 26th Gemini Awards | Dragons' Den | Mike Armitage, Lisa Gabriele, Tracie Tighe | CBC | |
| 2011; 26th Gemini Awards | All for Nothing? | Tim Alp, Lisa Nault | W Network | |
| 2011; 26th Gemini Awards | Best Trip Ever | Sharone Ostrovsky, Andrew Burnstein | Discovery Channel | |
| 2011; 26th Gemini Awards | CheF*OFF | Peter Moscone, Carolyn Meland, Romano D'Andrea, D'Arcy Butler, Jeff Preyra | Food Network (Corus) | |
| 2011; 26th Gemini Awards | Conviction Kitchen | Gerard Barry, Simon Lloyd | Citytv | |
2012; 1st Canadian Screen Awards
| 2012; 1st Canadian Screen Awards | Dragons' Den | Mike Armitage, Lisa Gabriele, Tracie Tighe | CBC | |
| 2012; 1st Canadian Screen Awards | Canada's Greatest Know-It-All | Lena Cordina, David W. Brady, Brad Brough | Discovery Channel | |
| 2012; 1st Canadian Screen Awards | Canada's Handyman Challenge | Joseph Blasioli, Maria Pimentel | HGTV | |
| 2012; 1st Canadian Screen Awards | The Real Housewives of Vancouver | John G. Lenic, Grant Fraggalosch, Grant Greschuk, Louise Clark, Erin Haskett | Slice | |
| 2012; 1st Canadian Screen Awards | Redemption Inc. | Lesia Capone, Cathie James, Guy O'Sullivan | CBC | |
2013; 2nd Canadian Screen Awards
| 2013; 2nd Canadian Screen Awards | Dragons' Den | Mike Armitage, Lisa Gabriele, Tracie Tighe | CBC | |
| 2013; 2nd Canadian Screen Awards | Canada's Greatest Know-It-All | Brad Brough, Suzanne Steeves | Discovery Channel | |
| 2013; 2nd Canadian Screen Awards | Canada's Handyman Challenge | Joseph Blasioli, Maria Pimentel | HGTV | |
| 2013; 2nd Canadian Screen Awards | Intervention Canada | Tom Powers, Barbara Bowlby, John Brunton, John Murray, Karen Wookey | Slice | |
| 2013; 2nd Canadian Screen Awards | Top Chef Canada | Barbara Bowlby, Cliff Dempster, Eric Abboud, Jennifer Pratt, John Brunton, Mark Lysakowski | Food Network (Corus) | |
2014; 3rd Canadian Screen Awards
| 2014; 3rd Canadian Screen Awards | The Amazing Race Canada | Eric Abboud, Mike Bickerton, Barbara Bowlby, John Brunton, Mark Lysakowski | CTV | |
| 2014; 3rd Canadian Screen Awards | Big Brother Canada | Eric Abboud, Barbara Bowlby, Erin Brock, Sue Brophey, John Brunton | Slice | |
| 2014; 3rd Canadian Screen Awards | MasterChef Canada | Lesia Capone, Cathie James, Krista Look, Guy O’Sullivan | CTV | |
| 2014; 3rd Canadian Screen Awards | The Ultimate Fighter Nations: Canada vs. Australia | Dave Bigelow, Mike Wetmore, Don Young | Sportsnet 360 | |
| 2014; 3rd Canadian Screen Awards | Unusually Thicke | Carrie Mudd | Slice | |
2015; 4th Canadian Screen Awards
| 2015; 4th Canadian Screen Awards | The Amazing Race Canada | John Brunton, Barbara Bowlby, Mark Lysakowski, Mike Bickerton, Sarah James, Kyle Martin, Daniela Battistella, Robyn Bigue, Ann Camilleri, Guy Clarkson, Catherine Petersen | CTV | |
| 2015; 4th Canadian Screen Awards | Big Brother Canada | John Brunton, Barbara Bowlby, Erin Brock, Sue Brophey, Eric Abboud, David Lembke, Brett Morris, Lara Shaw | Slice | |
| 2015; 4th Canadian Screen Awards | Dragons' Den | Tracie Tighe, Amy Bourne, Scott Boyd | CBC | |
| 2015; 4th Canadian Screen Awards | Game of Homes | Blair Reekie, Mark Miller, Kelly McClughan, Bill Gaudsmith | W Network | |
| 2015; 4th Canadian Screen Awards | MasterChef Canada | Lesia Capone, Cathie James, Krista Look, Guy O'Sullivan | CTV | |
2016; 5th Canadian Screen Awards
| 2016; 5th Canadian Screen Awards | The Amazing Race Canada | John Brunton, Barbara Bowlby, Mark Lysakowski, Mike Bickerton, Sarah James, Kyle Martin, Robyn Bigue, Guy Clarkson, Ann Camilleri, Stephanie Millman, Catherine Petersen | CTV | |
| 2016; 5th Canadian Screen Awards | Big Brother Canada | John Brunton, Barbara Bowlby, Erin Brock, Sue Brophey, Eric Abboud, Trevor Boris, David Lembke, Lara Shaw, Brett Morris | Global | |
| 2016; 5th Canadian Screen Awards | Canada's Smartest Person | Robert Cohen, Barry Davis | CBC | |
| 2016; 5th Canadian Screen Awards | Knock Knock Ghost | Kyle Whitelaw, Philip Webb, Brad E. Danks | OutTV | |
| 2016; 5th Canadian Screen Awards | MasterChef Canada | Guy O'Sullivan, Cathie James, Lesia Capone, Krista Look, Maria Knight | CTV | |
2017; 6th Canadian Screen Awards
| 2017; 6th Canadian Screen Awards | The Amazing Race Canada | John Brunton, Barbara Bowlby, Mark Lysakowski, Mike Bickerton, Sarah James, Kyle Martin, Robyn Bigue, Guy Clarkson, Ann Camilleri, Stephanie Millman, Catherine Petersen | CTV | |
| 2017; 6th Canadian Screen Awards | The Bachelorette Canada | Claire Freeland | W Network | |
| 2017; 6th Canadian Screen Awards | Big Brother Canada | John Brunton, Barbara Bowlby, Erin Brock, Sue Brophey, Eric Abboud, Trevor Boris, Brett Morris, Liam Colle, Lara Shaw | Global | |
| 2017; 6th Canadian Screen Awards | MasterChef Canada | Guy O'Sullivan, Lesia Capone, Cathie James, Marike Emery | CTV | |
| 2017; 6th Canadian Screen Awards | Top Chef Canada | John Brunton, Barbara Bowlby, Mark Lysakowski, Eric Abboud, Cliff Dempster, Jennifer Pratt, Erica Lenczner | Food Network (Corus) | |
2018; 7th Canadian Screen Awards
| 2018; 7th Canadian Screen Awards | The Amazing Race Canada | John Brunton, Barbara Bowlby, Mark Lysakowski, Mike Bickerton, Sarah James, Kyle Martin, Robyn Bigue, Guy Clarkson, Ann Camilleri, Stephanie Millman, Catherine Petersen | CTV | |
| 2018; 7th Canadian Screen Awards | Big Brother Canada | John Brunton, Erin Brock, Eric Abboud, Trevor Boris, Liam Colle, Daniel Klimitz, Chris Carter, Chris Chilco, Amy Regan | Global | |
| 2018; 7th Canadian Screen Awards | Canada's Smartest Person Junior | Robert Cohen, Barry Davis, Melanie Brobyn | CBC | |
| 2018; 7th Canadian Screen Awards | Knock Knock Ghost | Kyle Whitelaw, Philip Webb | OutTV | |
| 2018; 7th Canadian Screen Awards | MasterChef Canada | Cathie James, Lesia Capone, Meredith Veats, David Donohue | CTV | |
2019; 8th Canadian Screen Awards
| 2019; 8th Canadian Screen Awards | The Amazing Race Canada | John Brunton, Mark Lysakowski, Sarah James, Mark Peacock, Jesse Storey, Michael Tersigni, Jeff Thrasher, Robyn Bigue, Ann Camilleri, Guy Clarkson, Catherine Petersen, Marc Poirier, Michael Yerxa | CTV | |
| 2019; 8th Canadian Screen Awards | Big Brother Canada | Erin Brock, John Brunton, Trevor Boris, Amy Regan, Liam Colle, Daniel Klimitz, Chris Carter, Eric Abboud | Global | |
| 2019; 8th Canadian Screen Awards | Blown Away | Matt Hornburg, Mark J.W. Bishop, Donna Luke, Ron Carroll, Mike Bickerton, Ajeeth Parkal | Makeful | |
| 2019; 8th Canadian Screen Awards | The Great Canadian Baking Show | Cathie James, Lesia Capone, Marike Emery | CBC | |
| 2019; 8th Canadian Screen Awards | Top Chef Canada | John Brunton, Mark Lysakowski, Eric Abboud, Cliff Dempster, Sarah James, Daniel Klimitz, Erica Lenczner | Food Network (Corus) | |

== 2020s ==
| Year | Program | Producers | Network | Ref |
|---|---|---|---|---|
2020; 9th Canadian Screen Awards
| 2020; 9th Canadian Screen Awards | Canada's Drag Race | Michael Kot, Laura Michalchyshyn, Betty Orr, Mike Bickerton, Pam McNair, RuPaul Charles, Fenton Bailey, Randy Barbato, Tom Campbell, Randy Lennox, Tracey Pearce, Jen Markowitz | Crave | |
| 2020; 9th Canadian Screen Awards | Battle of the Blades | Sandra Bezic, John Brunton, Lindsay Cox, Erin Brock, Mark Lysakowski | CBC | |
| 2020; 9th Canadian Screen Awards | Dragons' Den | Tracie Tighe, Molly Middleton, Yette Vandendam | CBC | |
| 2020; 9th Canadian Screen Awards | The Great Canadian Baking Show | Cathie James, Lesia Capone, Marike Emery | CBC | |
| 2020; 9th Canadian Screen Awards | Wall of Chefs | John Brunton, Mark Lysakowski, Eric Abboud, Erica Lenczner, Sarah James | Food Network (Corus) | |
2021; 10th Canadian Screen Awards
| 2021; 10th Canadian Screen Awards | Canada's Drag Race | Pam McNair, Betty Orr, Trevor Boris, Laura Michalshyshyn, Michael Kot, Fenton Bailey, Randy Barbato, Tom Campbell, RuPaul Charles, Justin Stockman, Jen Markowitz, Spencer Fritz | Crave | |
| 2021; 10th Canadian Screen Awards | Big Brother Canada | Erin Brock, John Brunton, Eric Abboud, Trevor Boris, Arisa Cox, Liam Colle, Amy Regan, Vanessa Rennard, Daniel Klimitz | Global | |
| 2021; 10th Canadian Screen Awards | Blown Away | Matthew Hornburg, Mark J.W. Bishop, Donna Luke, Amy Hosking | Netflix | |
| 2021; 10th Canadian Screen Awards | Fire Masters | Mike Sheerin, Tanya Linton, Jennifer Pratt | Food Network (Corus) | |
| 2021; 10th Canadian Screen Awards | Top Chef Canada | John Brunton, Eric Abboud, Mark Lysakowski, Jessica Brunton, Cliff Dempster, Daniel Klimitz | Food Network (Corus) | |
2022; 11th Canadian Screen Awards
| 2022; 11th Canadian Screen Awards | The Amazing Race Canada | John Brunton, Mark Lysakowski, Bertram van Munster, Elise Doganieri, Sarah James, Vanessa Rennard, Robyn Bigue, Ann Camilleri, Guy Clarkson, Catherine Petersen | CTV | |
| 2022; 11th Canadian Screen Awards | Best in Miniature | Matthew Hornburg, Mark J.W. Bishop, Diane Rankin, Donna Luke, Marike Emery, Jacqui Skeete | CBC Gem | |
| 2022; 11th Canadian Screen Awards | Blown Away | Matthew Hornburg, Mark J.W. Bishop, Donna Luke, Amy Hosking | Netflix | |
| 2022; 11th Canadian Screen Awards | Canada's Drag Race | Trevor Boris, Michelle Mama, Yette Vandendam, Betty Orr, Laura Michalchyshyn, Michael Kot, Justin Stockman, Fenton Bailey, Randy Barbato, Tom Campbell, RuPaul Charles, Spencer Fritz | Crave | |
| 2022; 11th Canadian Screen Awards | A Cut Above | Matthew Hornburg, Mark J.W. Bishop, Carly Spencer, Diane Rankin, Donna Luke, Grant Greschuk | Discovery | |
2023; 12th Canadian Screen Awards
| 2023; 12th Canadian Screen Awards | Canada's Drag Race: Canada vs. the World | Trevor Boris, Michelle Mama, Yette Vandendam, Betty Orr, Laura Michalchyshyn, Michael Kot, Justin Stockman, Fenton Bailey, Randy Barbato, Tom Campbell, RuPaul Charles, Spencer Fritz | Crave | |
| 2023; 12th Canadian Screen Awards | The Amazing Race Canada | John Brunton, Mark Lysakowski, Bertram Van Munster, Elise Doganieri, Robyn Bigue, Ann Camilleri, Guy Clarkson, Catherine Petersen, Vanessa Rennard, Janel Hirdes, Anthony Matkovic, Jon Montgomery, Dayna Sayer, Michael Tersigni, Jesse Storey, Sarah James | CTV | |
| 2023; 12th Canadian Screen Awards | Best in Miniature | Matthew Hornburg, Mark J.W. Bishop, Diane Rankin, Donna Luke, Erica Lenczner | CBC Gem | |
| 2023; 12th Canadian Screen Awards | Big Brother Canada | Erin Brock, Eric Abboud, Arisa Cox, John Brunton, Jennifer Leek, Liam Colle, Chris Carter, Jessica Brunton, Lauren McCuaig, Cory Bell, Nick Vasil, Victoria De Filippis, Akhila Adige, Mark Holland | Global | |
| 2023; 12th Canadian Screen Awards | Canada's Ultimate Challenge | John Brunton, Mark Lysakowski, Phil Gurin, Ann-Marie Redmond, Jeff Thrasher, Robyn Bigue, Ken Katigbak, Catherine Petersen, Sarah James, Vanessa Rennard, Michael Yerxa, Sue Brophey | CBC Television | |
2024; 13th Canadian Screen Awards
| 2024; 13th Canadian Screen Awards | Canada's Drag Race | Trevor Boris, Yette Vandendam, Betty Orr, Laura Michalchyshyn, Michael Kot, Justin Stockman, Fenton Bailey, Randy Barbato, Tom Campbell, RuPaul Charles, Spencer Fritz, Brett Ashley, Tomás Maturana | Crave | |
| 2024; 13th Canadian Screen Awards | Canada's Ultimate Challenge | Erin Brock, John Brunton, Phil Gurin, Mark Lysakowski, Jeff Thrasher, Robyn Bigue, Chris Carter, Liam Colle, Ken Katibak, Lauren McCuaig, Catherine Petersen, Jesse Storey, Rose Marra | CBC | |
| 2024; 13th Canadian Screen Awards | Dragons' Den | Molly Middleton, Amy Bourne | CBC | |
| 2024; 13th Canadian Screen Awards | The Great Canadian Pottery Throw Down | Jamie Brown, Stephanie Fast, Seth Rogen, Evan Goldberg, James Weaver, Alex McAtee | CBC | |
| 2024; 13th Canadian Screen Awards | Top Chef Canada | John Brunton, Mark Lysakowski, Eric Abboud, Jessica Brunton, Daniel Klimitz, Deanne Marsh, Mark Holland, Anthony Matkovic | Food Network (Corus) | |
