= Dvira Ovadia =

Canadian interior decorator

- Born: 1979 (age 46–47); Israel, Tel Aviv
- Education: B.Arch (University of Toronto)
- Occupation: Interior designer
- Website: Dvira Ovadia Online

Dvira Ovadia (born 1979 in Israel) is a Canadian television personality and an award-winning/celebrity designer. She is best known as winning the 2007 show called From The Ground Up with Debbie Travis season two. The show aired on Global TV May 31, 2007. The show was re-aired on HGTV Canada in the spring of 2008. In spring of 2008, the show was also airing in the United States on the Fine Living Network, Sunday nights at 10EST. Dvira Ovadia is also known for her weekly syndicated column which appears in many blogs which readers often write in to have their decorating questions answered.

== Early life and education ==
Dvira Ovadia was born in Israel in 1979 to a Russian-born mother and a father of Egyptian descent. Prior to moving to Toronto, Ontario, Canada, where she currently resides, she lived in Brussels, Belgium for the most part of her youth. Having been exposed to various cultures has led her to appreciate and understand many different aspects of design. She grew up loving puzzles and putting things together, she was quoted saying "As a child, I always loved design, whether it was fashion design or interior design or architecture."

Ovadia began her design education with a B.Arch at the University of Toronto in 1998-2001 where she undertook a major in architecture and a minor in fine art history. She graduated with honors and obtained several diplomas in the technical design sector from Sheridan College in Toronto.

In 2002, Ovadia moved to New York to pursue a master's degree in interior design at the Pratt Institute, New York City. She lived in New York for two years where she studied and worked at INARCH, an interior design firm. After two years of living in New York City she returned to Toronto.

== Career after From the Ground Up, Season II ==
As a result of winning the show From the Ground Up, season II, Ovadia was awarded the title of chief designer for Debbie Travis to design and develop a series of Debbie Travis condos and homes. Ovadia worked with Debbie Travis to develop 10 model homes for Tribute Communities, encompassing everything from interior design to furnishing and sourcing products from all over the world.

Dvira Ovadia has an established Design Firm servicing residential and commercial projects. She has a regular column in the Toronto Sun Newspaper called 'Living Life by Design', and writes for a variety of magazines from Reno & Decor, On the Go, Hoss magazine, Embark Magazine, Home Decor & Renovation. Dvira also had a weekly blog for Yahoo! Canada from 2008 to 2014. Dvira Ovadia was the Designer and Art director for eight (8) seasons of HGTV's Income property with host Scott Mcgillivray, who was also involved in From The Ground Up., Dvira has also designed for HGTV's 'The Unsellables', 'Reno or Relocate' and has appeared as a guest expert regularly on City TV's 'Downright Domestic'.

Ovadia often shares her design tips and trends in blogs and articles. She writes a seasonal trends guide for Jewish Magazine, a Canadian publication. In December 2007, she wrote an article for Yahoo! where she discussed the year's holiday trends for the season. She also shared similar trends for the holiday season with Ontario Craft Brewers and with Condo Guide magazine.

== See also ==
- From The Ground Up with Debbie Travis
