= Richard Ryder =

Richard Ryder may refer to:

- Richard D. Ryder (born 1940), British psychologist and animal rights advocate
- Richard Ryder, Baron Ryder of Wensum (born 1949), British Conservative Party British politician and current member of the House of Lords
- Richard Ryder (politician, born 1766) (1766–1832), British politician
- Richard Ryder (actor) (1942–1995), actor who guest starred in Star Trek: Deep Space Nine and other television shows and movies
- Nova (Richard Rider), a Marvel Comics superhero whose name is often misspelled as Ryder
- Richard Ryder (comedian) (born 1966), Canadian comedian and broadcaster
