= Best in Miniature =

Canadian reality competition television series

- Genre: Reality competition
- Created by: Kelsey Espensen
- Directed by: Ryan Shaw (2022); Mike Bickerton (2022-present)
- Presented by: Aba Amuquandoh
- Judges: Micheal Lambie; Emma Waddell
- Country of origin: Canada
- Original language: English
- No. of seasons: 3
- No. of episodes: 26

Production
- Executive producers: Matthew Hornburg (2022-present); Mark J. W. Bishop (2022-present); Diane Rankin (2022-present); Donna Luke (2022-present); Marike Emery (2022); Carly Spencer (2022-2023)
- Producers: Jacqui Skeete (2022); Erica Lenczner (2022-present)
- Running time: 44 minutes
- Production companies: Blue Ant Media, CBC Television

Original release
- Network: CBC Gem
- Release: February 11, 2022

Best in Miniature is a Canadian reality competition television series, hosted by Aba Amuquandoh. The series premiered on CBC Gem in 2022.

The show features craftspeople skilled in competing to make the best miniature scale model of a dream home. The winner receives a residency with the International Guild of Miniature Artisans and $15,000 (Seasons 1 and 2) or $10,000 (Season 3).

== Format ==
In the first episode, contestants are given 10 hours to build the structure of their dream home. In each subsequent episode, competitors face off in two challenges. In the first "mini challenge," competitors must create one or more small items centred around a theme in a short period of time. The winner of the challenge is given either a ribbon, reward, or advantage. In the second challenge, competitors are given 8 hours to complete one room in their dream house. After judging, one contestant is sent home each episode.

== Contestants ==
=== Season 1 ===
Name	Residence	Source
Antavia Cherry	Charlotte, North Carolina	
Cielo Vianzon	Toronto, Ontario	
Susete Saraiva	Toronto, Ontario	
Tina MacDonald	Edmonton, Alberta	
Anica (Kat) Williams	Ocala, Florida	
Roxanne Brathwaite	Toronto, Ontario	
Susan Mattinson	Truro, Nova Scotia	
Tom Brown	Calgary, Alberta	
Lewis Bush	Hopkins. South Carolina	
Phillip Nuveen	Brooklyn, New York	
Stephen Eddleston	London, UK	

=== Season 2 ===
Name	Residence	Source
Michele Barrow-Belisle	London, Ontario	
Tracy Ealdama	Vancouver, British Columbia	
Alberto Gozzi	Brampton, Ontario	
Nigel (Nick) Humes	Kingston, Jamaica	
Debra Kirby	Norfolk, England	
Hannah Lemon	London, England	
Briar Nielsen	Uxbridge, Ontario	
Preston Poling	Louisville, Kentucky	
Micheline Wedderburn	Toronto, Ontario	
Gabbi Whiteley	Vancouver, British Columbia	

=== Season 3 ===
Name	Residence	Source
Susan Canaday Henry	Las Vegas, Nevada	
Shelley Acker	Kentville, Nova Scotia	
August Riche	Queens, New York	
Jen Arnold	Winnipeg, Manitoba	
Nalini Sookdeo	Nottingham, Maryland	
Mike Fraysher	Hanahan, South Carolina	
Tiffany Monk	Sutton, Quebec	
Lance Cardinal	Bigstone Cree Nation	
Elliott Langford	Cheltenham, UK	
Arline Smith	Port Hope, Ontario	

== Contestant progress ==
SEASON 1
Contestant	Home Style	1	2	3	4	5	6	7	8	9	10
Susete	Haunted House	SAFE	SAFE	WIN	SAFE	WIN	WIN	WIN	WIN	WIN	WINNER
Phillip	Ultra Modern New York Townhouse	SAFE	WIN	SAFE	SAFE	SAFE	WIN	SAFE	SAFE	WIN	RUNNER UP
Stephen	Victorian Dollhouse	SAFE	SAFE	WIN	WIN	SAFE	WIN	SAFE	WIN	SAFE	RUNNER UP
Cielo	Affordable Shipping Container	SAFE	SAFE	SAFE	SAFE	SAFE	WIN	SAFE	SAFE	OUT	
Roxanne	Mid-Century Modern Home	SAFE	SAFE	SAFE	SAFE	SAFE	WIN	WIN	OUT		
Tom	Grandparent's Cottage	WIN	SAFE	SAFE	WIN	WIN	WIN	OUT			
Tina	Medieval Fantasy House	SAFE	SAFE	SAFE	SAFE	SAFE	OUT				
Lewis	Atlanta Mansion	SAFE	SAFE	SAFE	SAFE	OUT					
Kat	Modern House	SAFE	WIN	OUT							
Susan	East Coast Family Home	SAFE	OUT								
Antavia	Sleek and Stylish House	OUT									

SEASON 2
Contestant	Home Style	1	2	3	4	5	6	7	8
Hannah	Japanese Cottage	WIN	SAFE	SAFE	WIN	SAFE	SAFE	SAFE	WINNER
Tracy	Futuristic Home	SAFE	WIN	SAFE	SAFE	WIN	SAFE	WIN	RUNNER UP
Preston	Atomic Era House	SAFE	SAFE	WIN	SAFE	SAFE	WIN	WIN	RUNNER UP
Briar	Refurbished Warehouse	SAFE	SAFE	WIN	SAFE	SAFE	WIN	OUT	
Gabbi	Edwardian House	SAFE	SAFE	SAFE	WIN	WIN	OUT		
Michele	French Country Chateau	SAFE	SAFE	SAFE	SAFE	OUT			
Debra	Art Nouveau House	SAFE	SAFE	SAFE	OUT				
Micheline	1970's Childhood Home	SAFE	WIN	OUT					
Alberto	Italian Villa	SAFE	OUT						
Nigel	Caribbean House	OUT							

SEASON 3
Contestant	Home Style	1	2	3	4	5	6	7	8
Eliott	Mad Scientist House	WIN	SAFE	WIN	SAFE	WIN	SAFE	SAFE	WINNER
Lance	Indigenous Arbour Home	SAFE	WIN	SAFE	WIN	SAFE	WIN	SAFE	RUNNER UP
Tiffany	Log Cabin	SAFE	SAFE	SAFE	WIN	SAFE	WIN	WIN	RUNNER UP
Nalini	Island House	SAFE	SAFE	SAFE	SAFE	SAFE	SAFE	OUT	
Mike	Off-Grid Charleston Manor	WIN	SAFE	WIN	SAFE	WIN	OUT		
Shelley	Converted Barn	SAFE	SAFE	SAFE	SAFE	OUT			
Jen	Tudor Home	SAFE	SAFE	SAFE	OUT				
Arline	Morocan Riad	SAFE	SAFE	OUT					
August	New York Mansion	SAFE	OUT						
Susan	Utopian Deco House	OUT							

(WIN) The Contestant won that episode's Room Challenge.
(WIN) The Contestant won that episode's Mini Challenge.
(WIN) The Contestant won that episode's Mini Challenge and Room Challenge.
(OUT) The Contestant won that episode’s Mini Challenge but was eliminated from the competition during the Room Challenge.
(OUT) The Contestant was eliminated from the competition.
(SAFE) The Contestant won neither the Mini Challenge nor Room Challenge, and they were not eliminated.
(WINNER) The Contestant was named Best in Miniature.
(RUNNER UP) The contestant was runner up.

== Episodes ==
Season	Miniaturists	Winner	Runner(s)-up	Episodes	Originally released	
Season	Miniaturists	Winner	Runner(s)-up	Episodes	First released	Last released
1	11	Susete Saraiva	Phillip Nuveen & Stephen Eddleston	10	February 11, 2022	April 15, 2022
2	10	Hannah Lemon	Preston Poling & Tracy Ealdama	8	February 19, 2023	April 16, 2023
3	10	Eliott Langford	Lance Cardinal & Tiffany Monk	8	December 26, 2023	December 26, 2023

=== Season 1 (2022) ===
No. overall	No. in season	Title	Original release date
1	1	"Open House"	February 11, 2022
The miniaturists head to the workshop and build the structure for their dream homes.
2	2	"Child's Play & Living Room"	February 18, 2022
For the mini challenge, the miniaturists make tiny toys. For the room challenge, they build their living rooms.
3	3	"Blooms & Bathroom"	February 25, 2022
For the mini challenge, the miniaturists make tiny florals. For the room challenge, they build their bathrooms.
4	4	"Bookworms & Children's Room"	March 4, 2022
For the mini challenge, the miniaturists make tiny books. For the room challenge, they build their kid's rooms.
5	5	"Cakes & Dining"	March 11, 2022
For the mini challenge, the miniaturists make tiny edible cakes. For the room challenge, they build their dining rooms.
6	6	"Paintings & Office Work"	March 18, 2022
For the mini challenge, the miniaturists make tiny paintings inspired by their loved ones. For the room challenge, they build their offices.
7	7	"Pillows & Beds"	March 25, 2022
For the mini challenge, the miniaturists make tiny pillows. For the room challenge, they build their master bedrooms.
8	8	"Critters & Kitchen"	April 1, 2022
For the mini challenge, the miniaturists make tiny animals. For the room challenge, they build their kitchens.
9	9	"Sweet Surprise & Miniaturist's Choice"	April 8, 2022
For the mini challenge, the miniaturists make tiny candies. For the room challenge, they build a last room of their choice.
10	10	"Curb Appeal"	April 15, 2022
In the season finale, the miniaturists finish the outside of their homes. A winner is crowned.

=== Season 2 (2023) ===
No. overall	No. in season	Title	Original release date
11	1	"First Impressions"	February 19, 2023
The miniaturists head to the workshop and build the structure for their dream homes.
12	2	"All in the Family"	February 26, 2023
For the mini challenge, the miniaturists make tiny family heirlooms. For the room challenge, they build their family rooms.
13	3	"Don't Cramp my Style"	March 5, 2023
For the mini challenge, the miniaturists make tiny hats and shoes. For the room challenge, they build their master bedrooms and ensuites.
14	4	"Food Glorious Food"	March 19, 2023
For the mini challenge, the miniaturists make tiny desert island dishes. For the room challenge, they build their kitchens.
15	5	"It's Party Time"	March 26, 2023
For the mini challenge, the miniaturists make tiny party decorations. For the room challenge, they build their dining rooms.
16	6	"Child's Play"	April 2, 2023
For the mini challenge, the miniaturists make tiny items inspired by their childhoods. For the room challenge, they build their kid's rooms.
17	7	"Imagination Station"	April 9, 2023
For the mini challenge, the miniaturists turn trash into treasure. For the room challenge, they build a last room of their choice.
18	8	"The Finale"	April 16, 2023
In the season finale, the miniaturists finish the outside of their homes with a yard sale. A winner is crowned.

=== Season 3 (2023) ===
No. overall	No. in season	Title	Original release date
19	1	"Show Us Your Spirit"	December 26, 2023
The miniaturists head to the workshop and build the structure for their dream homes.
20	2	"Making a Grand Entrance"	December 26, 2023
21	3	"Give Us the Goodies"	December 26, 2023
22	4	"Ready to Rock"	December 26, 2023
For the mini challenge, the miniaturists make tiny pop icon mannequins. For the room challenge, they build their bedrooms with a walk-in closets.
23	5	"Making a Scene"	December 26, 2023
24	6	"Game Night"	December 26, 2023
For the mini challenge, the miniaturists make tiny vases on pottery wheels. For the room challenge, they build their lounges/games rooms.
25	7	"The Devil is in the Details"	December 26, 2023
For the mini challenge, the miniaturists make housewarming gifts for their fellow competitors. For the room challenge, they build either a kid's room or a hobby room.
26	8	"Take It Outside"	December 26, 2023
In the season finale, the miniaturists finish the outside of their homes. A winner is crowned.

== Awards and nominations ==
Year	Award	Category	Recipient	Results	Ref.
2023	Canadian Screen Awards	Best Reality/Competition Series	Best in Miniature	Nominated	
2023	Canadian Screen Awards	Best Photography, Lifestyle or Reality/Competition	Shane Geddes	Nominated	
2024	Canadian Screen Awards	Best Reality/Competition Series	Best in Miniature	Nominated	
2024	Canadian Screen Awards	Best Photography, Lifestyle or Reality/Competition	Shane Geddes	Nominated	
2024	Canadian Screen Awards	Best Production Design or Art Direction, Non-Fiction	Tim Luke	Nominated	
2025	Canadian Screen Awards	Best Picture Editing, Reality/Competition	Daniel Cable, Pat Fairbairn, Alexandra Mastronardi, Curtis Rogers, Olivia Shin	Nominated	
