= Buy Me =

Buy Me is a television program that has aired on HGTV in the U.S. since 2005, and on HGTV Canada since 2003, where it is that cable network's most popular show. It is also seen in Belgium and South Africa, either dubbed or with subtitles. It is produced by Whalley-Abbey Media Holdings (WHAM), which is owned by Debbie Travis and her husband, and produced Debbie Travis' Facelift.

It shows the entire process of selling a home, from listing the property, to repairing any problems with it, to open houses, to the negotiations of the selling process. It covers all of the details of the process, including home inspections, and occasionally even mild arguments between the sellers and real estate agents. Occasionally, the home fails to sell within the six-month period allotted, but in most cases (whether it sells or not) a postscript of sorts is given by the narrator or in text, stating how things turned out.

The show is generally taped around WHAM's native Montreal, and receives a Quebec tax credit for film and video production. A few more recent episodes are clearly shot around Vancouver in coastal British Columbia, and some in Calgary, Alberta's largest city. New episodes are being taped in the U.S., in both Raleigh, North Carolina and Denver, Colorado. The show has been renewed for five more 13-episode seasons.

Apparently because the show is seen by both Canadian and American audiences, any obvious indications of the shooting location are eliminated, including the blurring of street signs, and the omission of any place names by the narrator. Prices discussed are not changed or converted however, particularly since the U.S. dollar and Canadian dollar are nearly equal in value (as of 2007).

A similar series, Bought & Sold, has started airing as of May 2007 on HGTV in the U.S.
