= Bought & Sold (TV series) =

- Genre: Home renovation
- Country of origin: United States
- Original language: English

Original release
- Network: HGTV
- Release: April 29, 2007 – May 25, 2009

Bought & Sold is a television program that aired on HGTV. The show is a spin-off of HGTV Canada's Buy Me. The show focuses on 12 realtors who work out of ReMax Village Square Realtors located in northern New Jersey.

The program shows the entire process of selling a property, from listing the home, to repairing problems it may have with it, to open houses, to the home inspections and the negotiations of selling it. The show premiered on April 29, 2007. The show is produced for HGTV by Granada Entertainment USA.
