= All for One (TV series) =

2010 Canadian reality television series

- Country of origin: Canada
- No. of seasons: 1
- No. of episodes: 7

Production
- Running time: 60 minutes

Original release
- Network: CBC
- Release: September 26 – November 21, 2010

All for One was a Canadian reality television series hosted by Debbie Travis. The series aired on CBC, and followed Travis as she travelled around the country helping community heroes with their home renovations. Renovations had to be completed in 5 days, and everyone from locals in the community to Travis' own team take part.

Similar in format to Extreme Makeover: Home Edition, it aired on CBC from September 26 to November 21, 2010.
