= Andrew Rader =

Canadian author and aerospace engineer

Andrew A. Rader
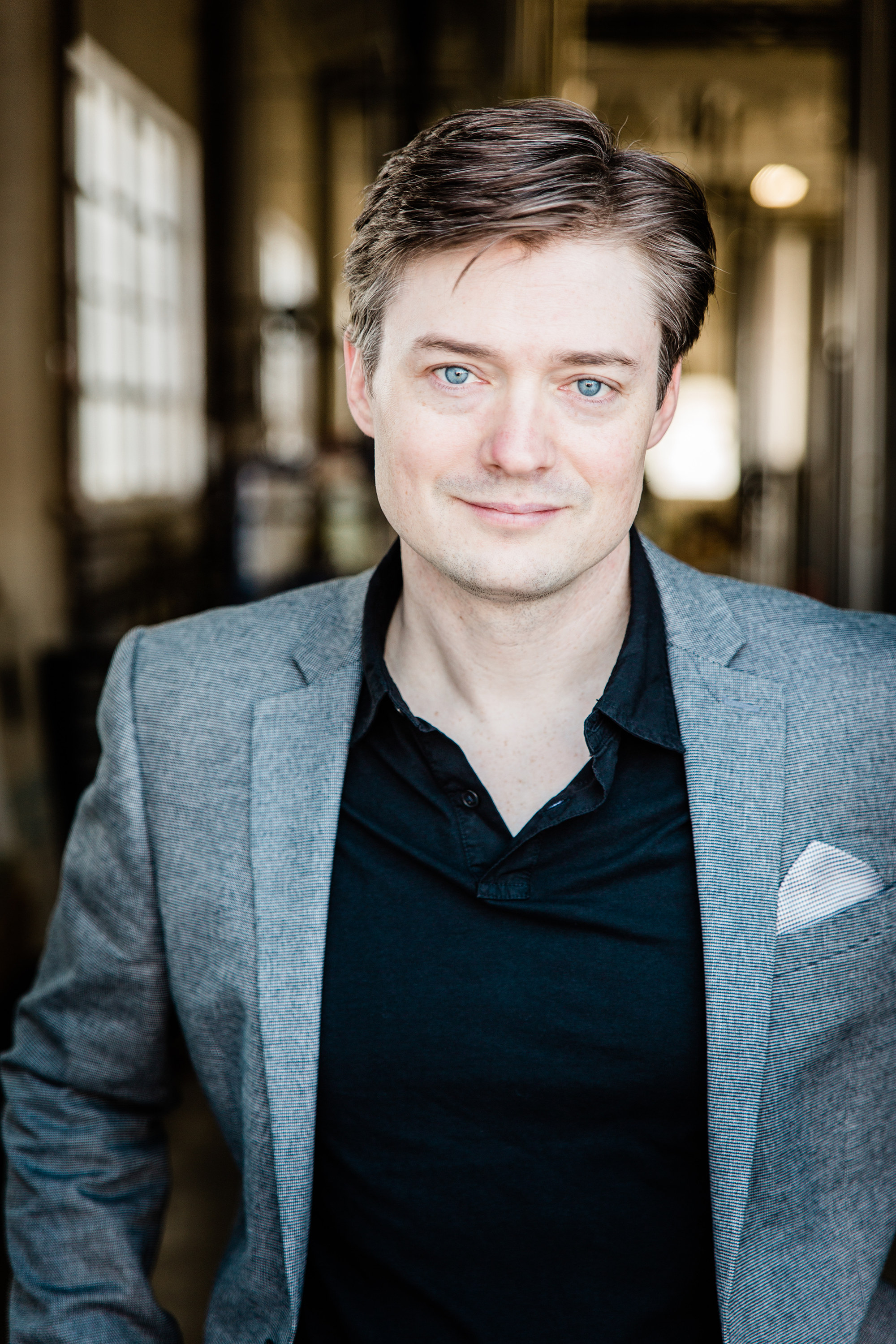
- 2019 photo of Andrew Rader
- Education: Massachusetts Institute of Technology
- Scientific career
- Thesis: Motion perception with conflicting or congruent visual and vestibular cues (2009)
- Doctoral advisors: Charles M. Oman and Daniel M. Merfeld

Andrew Alan Rader is a Canadian author and aerospace engineer. Rader was the Season 2 winner of the Discovery series, Canada's Greatest Know-It-All. Originally from Ottawa, Canada, Rader now works for SpaceX as a Mission Manager in Los Angeles.

== Education ==
Rader attended Carleton University from 1999 until 2005, receiving bachelor's and master's degrees in aerospace engineering there. He spent the following four years studying aeronautics and astronautics engineering at MIT, specializing in long-duration spaceflight, and receiving his Ph.D. in 2009.

== Career ==
Rader worked as a research engineer at Canada's National Research Council from 2003 to 2005. After moving to the US, he worked as a research engineer at MIT from 2005 to 2010.

After graduating from MIT, Rader worked as a Spacecraft Systems Engineer at COM DEV from 2010 to 2014. In 2014, Rader moved to Los Angeles to take a job at SpaceX where he now holds the position of Mission Manager.

Rader was a candidate for the Canadian Astronaut Corps in 2009 and 2017. He wrote about the experience in an article for Motherboard called "What It's Like to Be in the Running to Be an Astronaut." He was also in consideration for a one-way mission to Mars as part of the Mars One project in 2014. Natalie Angier interviewed him about the process for a New York Times story entitled A One-Way Trip to Mars? Many Would Sign Up.

== Books ==
Rader self-published his first five books via successful crowdfunding campaigns on Kickstarter. His first book to be released by a major publisher is the non-fiction chronicle of human exploration, Beyond the Known: How Exploration Created the Modern World and Will Take us to the Stars, released by Simon & Schuster on November 12, 2019.

His non-fiction books for adults include:

- 2019 - Beyond the Known: How Exploration Created the Modern World and Will Take us to the Stars
- 2014 - Leaving Earth: Why One-way to Mars Makes Sense

He is also the author of a series of science books for children:

- 2015 - Epic Space Adventure, successfully funded via Kickstarter on November 30, 2015
- 2016 - Mars Rover Rescue, successfully funded via Kickstarter on November 30, 2016
- 2017 - Rocket Science, successfully funded via Kickstarter on December 5, 2017
- 2018 - Europa Excursion, successfully funded via Kickstarter on December 8, 2018

== Selected research publications ==
- Rader, A., Newland, F., and Ross, A. (2011). An Iterative Subsystem-Generated Approach to Populating a Satellite Constellation Tradespace. AIAA Space 2011, Long Beach, CA, September 2011.
- Rader, A., Oman, C., and Merfeld, D. (2011). Perceived tilt and translation perception during variable-radius swing motion with congruent or conflicting visual and vestibular cues. Experimental Brain Research. Vol. 210: 173-184. (Expanded PhD Thesis Version)
- Rader, A., Ross, A., and Rhodes, D. (2010). A Methodological Comparison of Monte Carlo Methods and Epoch-Era Analysis for System Assessment in Uncertain Environments. 4th Annual IEEE Systems Conference, San Diego, CA, April 2010.
- Rader, A., Oman, C., and Merfeld, D. (2009). Motion Perception During Variable-Radius Swing Motion in Darkness. Journal of Neurophysiology Vol. 102. No. 4., 2232-2244
- Cummings, M.L., Tsonis, C., and Rader, A. (2008). The Impact of Multi-layered Data-blocks on Controller Performance. Air Traffic Control Quarterly (ATCA). Vol. 16, No. 2.
- Rader, A., Newman, D., and Carr, C. (2007). Loping: A strategy for reduced gravity human locomotion? Proceedings from the 37th International Conference on Environmental Systems (ICES)
- Rader, A., Afagh, F., Yousefi-Koma, A. and Zimcik, D. G. (2007). Optimization of Piezoelectric Actuator Configuration on a Flexible Fin for Vibration Control using Genetic Algorithms. Journal of Intelligent Material Systems and Structures. Vol. 18: 1015 - 1033. (Expanded Masters Thesis Version)
- Rader, A., Yousefi-Koma, A., Afagh, F., and Zimcik, D. (2005). Optimization of selective piezoelectric actuator configuration on a flexible fin using a genetic algorithm. Proceedings from the 12th Annual SPIE International Symposium on Smart Structures and Materials.
- Rader, A., Afagh, F., Yousefi-Koma, A., and Zimcik, D. (2004). Optimization of piezoelectric actuator configuration using a genetic algorithm for three-dimensional surface fitting of the frequency response function. Proceedings from the 15th Annual ICAST Conference on Adaptive Structure and Technologies.
- Rader, A., Clements, G., and Langlois, R. (2002). Dynamics of a Quarter-Car Suspension. Mechanical and Aerospace Engineering Laboratory Manual. Carleton University.
