= Westmount Mall =

Coordinates: 42.948°N 81.292°W

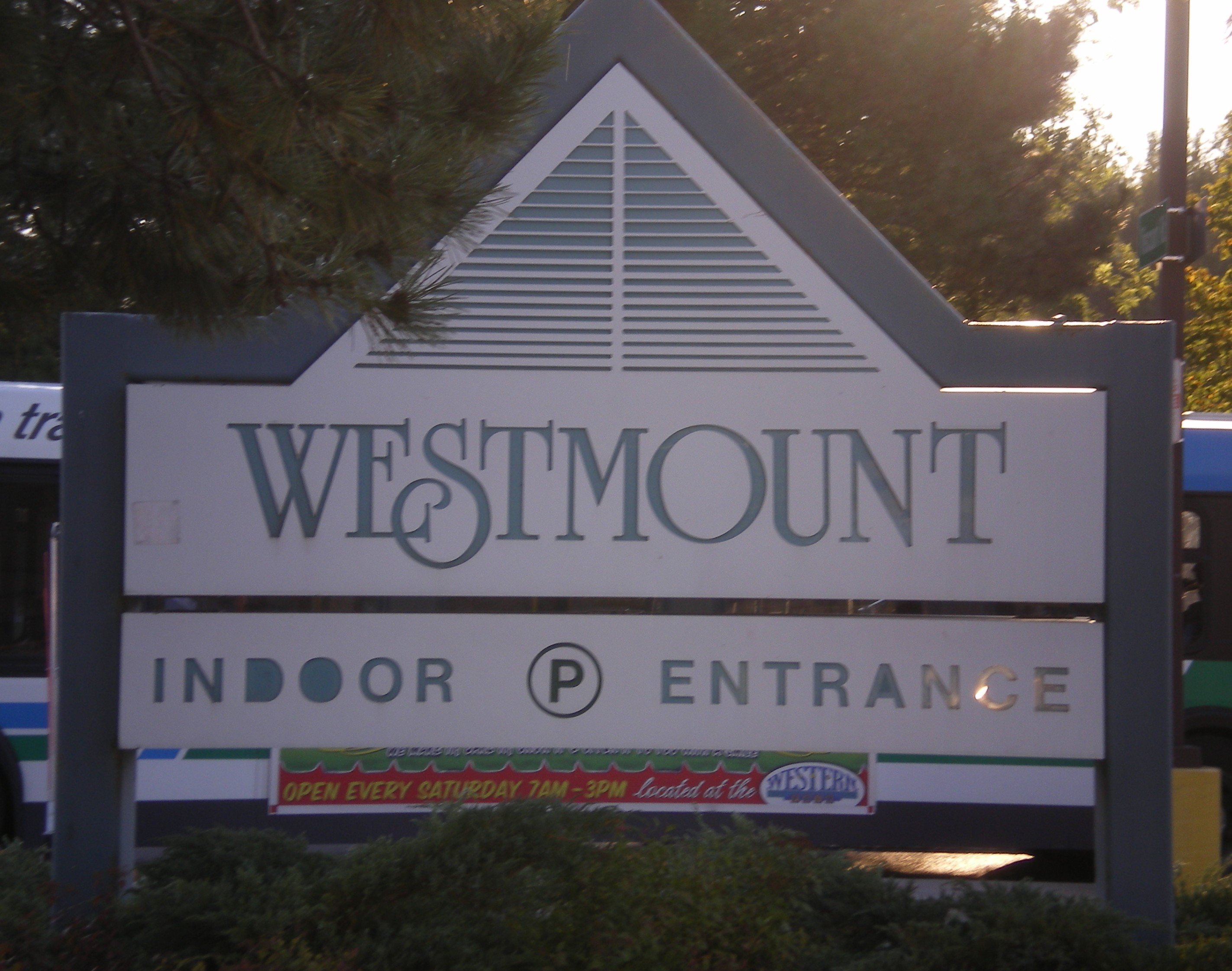
- Location: London, Ontario, Canada
- Address: 785 Wonderland Road South
- Opened: 1971
- Developer: Sifton Properties
- Manager: Bentall Retail Services
- Owner: Farhi Holdings Corporation
- Num. of stores: 65
- Num. of anchor tenants: 4
- Floors: 2
- Website: westmountshoppingcentre.com

Westmount Mall, also referred to as Westmount Commons or Westmount Shopping Centre, is a shopping centre located in London, Ontario. It is located at 785 Wonderland Road South at the northwest corner of Wonderland Road and Viscount Road.

== History ==
Westmount Mall's first phase opened initially in 1971 with 15 stores, including a Dominion grocery store as the anchor.

In 1973, the mall expanded, adding about 50 additional retailers, with Horizon as the main anchor. It was at that time the largest mall in Southwestern Ontario.

In 1978, Horizon was closed and converted into an Eaton's department store.

The mall was completely rebuilt as a two-storey mall, with underground parking and over 160 retailers. Construction began in 1987 and was finished in 1989.

In the early 2000s, a bus stop was added by the London Transit Commission, which services the following routes: 7, 10, 15 and 24.

By 1999-2000, Eaton's was converted into a Sears department store.

By the mid to late 2000s, Westmount's fortunes experienced a slump. The vacancy rate in the mall took a sharp increase as 40 stores slowly left the mall.

=== Recent years ===
In 2018, following the closure of Westmount's department store anchor, Sears Canada, the mall was bought for $31.5 million by a Toronto real estate investment firm. KingSett Capital, with partner McCOR Management, purchased the property from Penretail Management in February. The firm has planned to re-brand the mall and announce new anchor tenants and mixed-use developments.

In September 2018, an announcement regarding the former Target store was made, indicating it would be converted to both a "Fit 4 Less" (GoodLife Fitness) gym and office spaces. Target, which had replaced the Zellers store in the mall, closed in 2015.

The mall uses the names Westmount Shopping Centre and Westmount Commons interchangeably.

In 2022, Dollarama opened at the mall. In 2023, reptile zoo Reptilia opened at the mall. An Urban Planet and a Cineplex Odeon movie theatre still operate at Westmount, along with several restaurants located inside and outside of the main mall complex. Superking Supermarket, which replaced the A&P, is also open at the mall.

In 2025, Farhi Holdings Corporation purchased the mall. It was proposed that it could become a mixed-use property, with professional office spaces, medical facilities, and residential towers.
