= Reptilia (zoo) =

Collection of zoos in Canada

Coordinates: 43.8333°N 79.5207°W

Reptilia is a collection of Canada's largest indoor reptile zoos, with a combined area of over 84,000 ft^{2} (7,800 m^{2}) of indoor exhibits featuring over 250 reptiles, amphibians and arachnids.

Currently there are three Ontario locations, one in Vaughan, one in Whitby, and one in London.

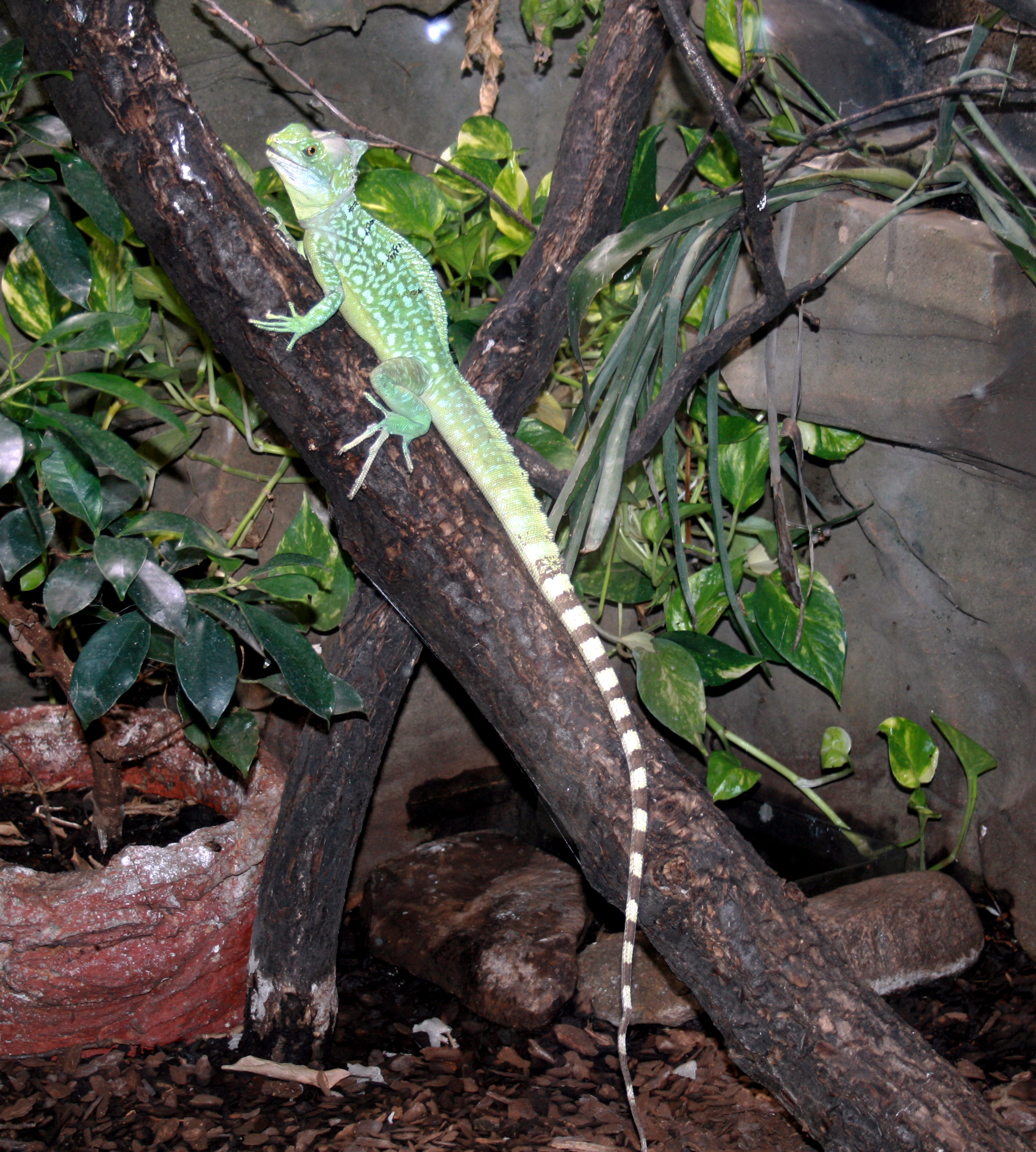
Basiliscus plumifrons at Reptilia Zoo

== Locations ==
The original Reptilia zoo was established in Vaughan and is housed in a 25,000-square-foot (2,300 m^{2}) facility. In 2018, it opened a second location in Whitby in a former 31,000 square feet (2,900 m^{2}) Rona store. In late 2018, it announced plans to create similar zoos in London and Barrie. London City Council rejected the proposal for a 28,000-square-foot (2,600 m^{2}) reptile zoo in Westmount Mall. However, the council later reversed course in 2022 and allowed the company to open at Westmount Mall.

== Attractions ==
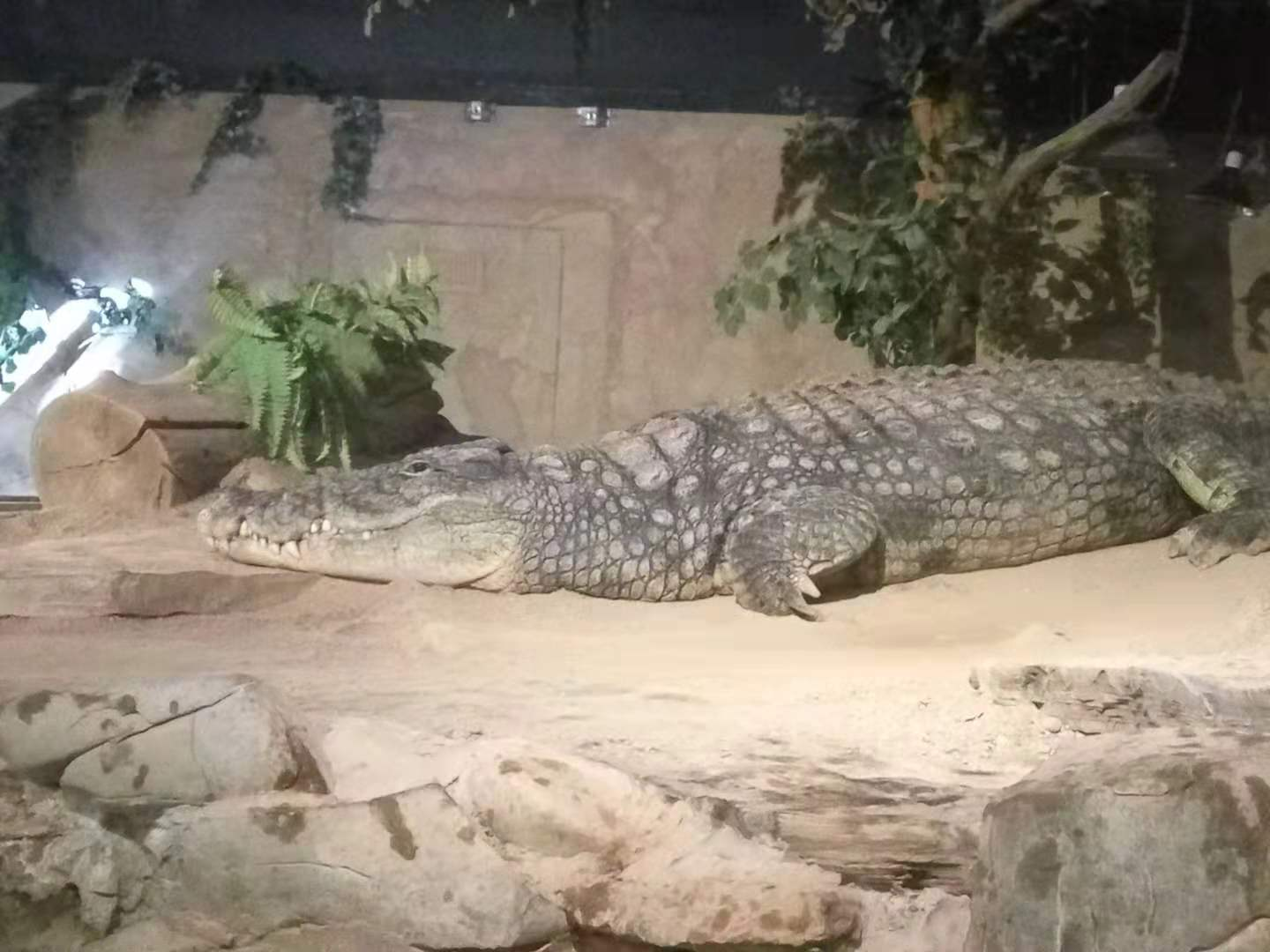
Induna in September 2022

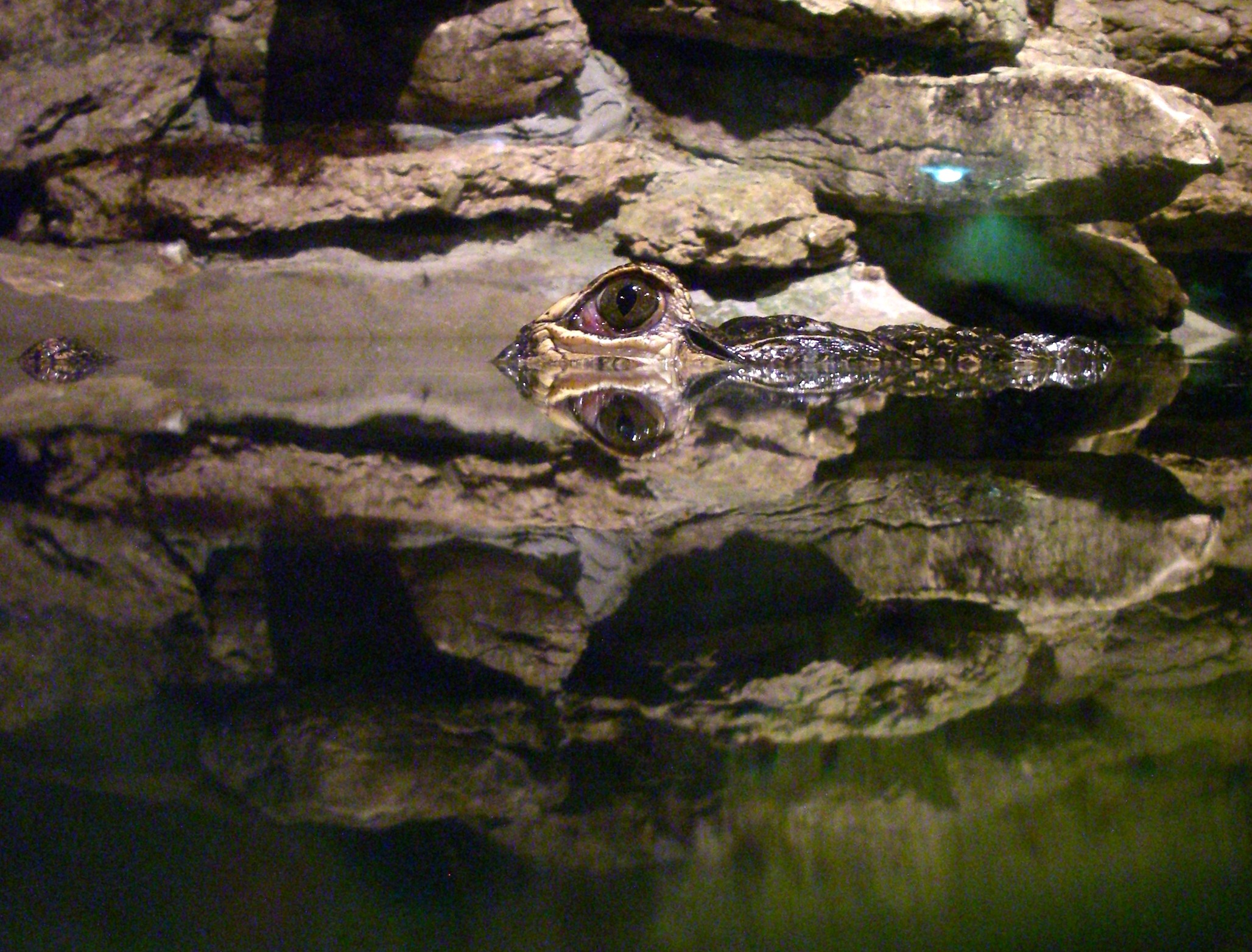
Participants learn how alligators and crocodiles hide themselves in the water. Here we see the small above-water portion of the reptile well camouflaged, though also reflected in the water.

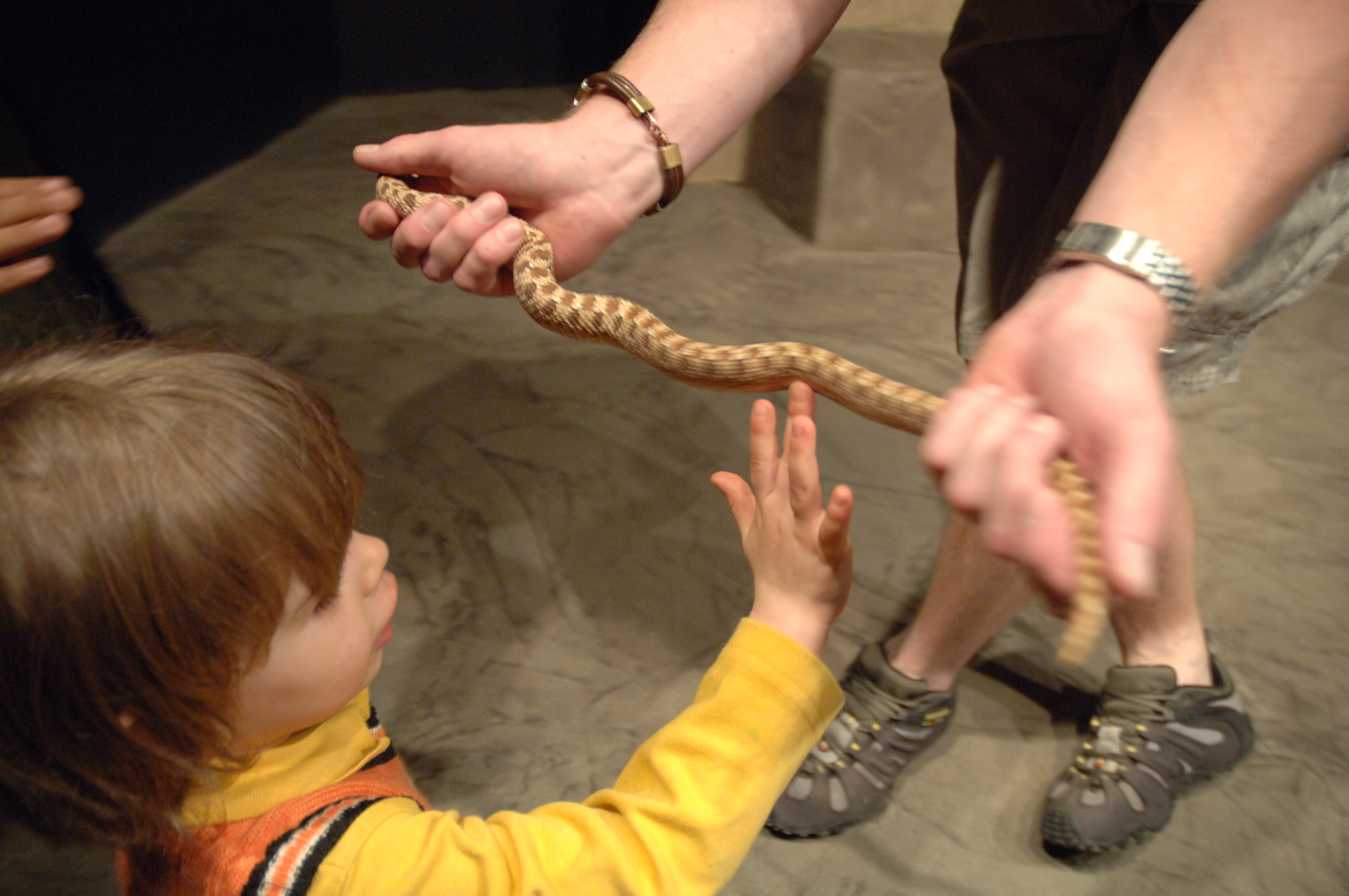
Live reptiles are used in hands-on teaching.

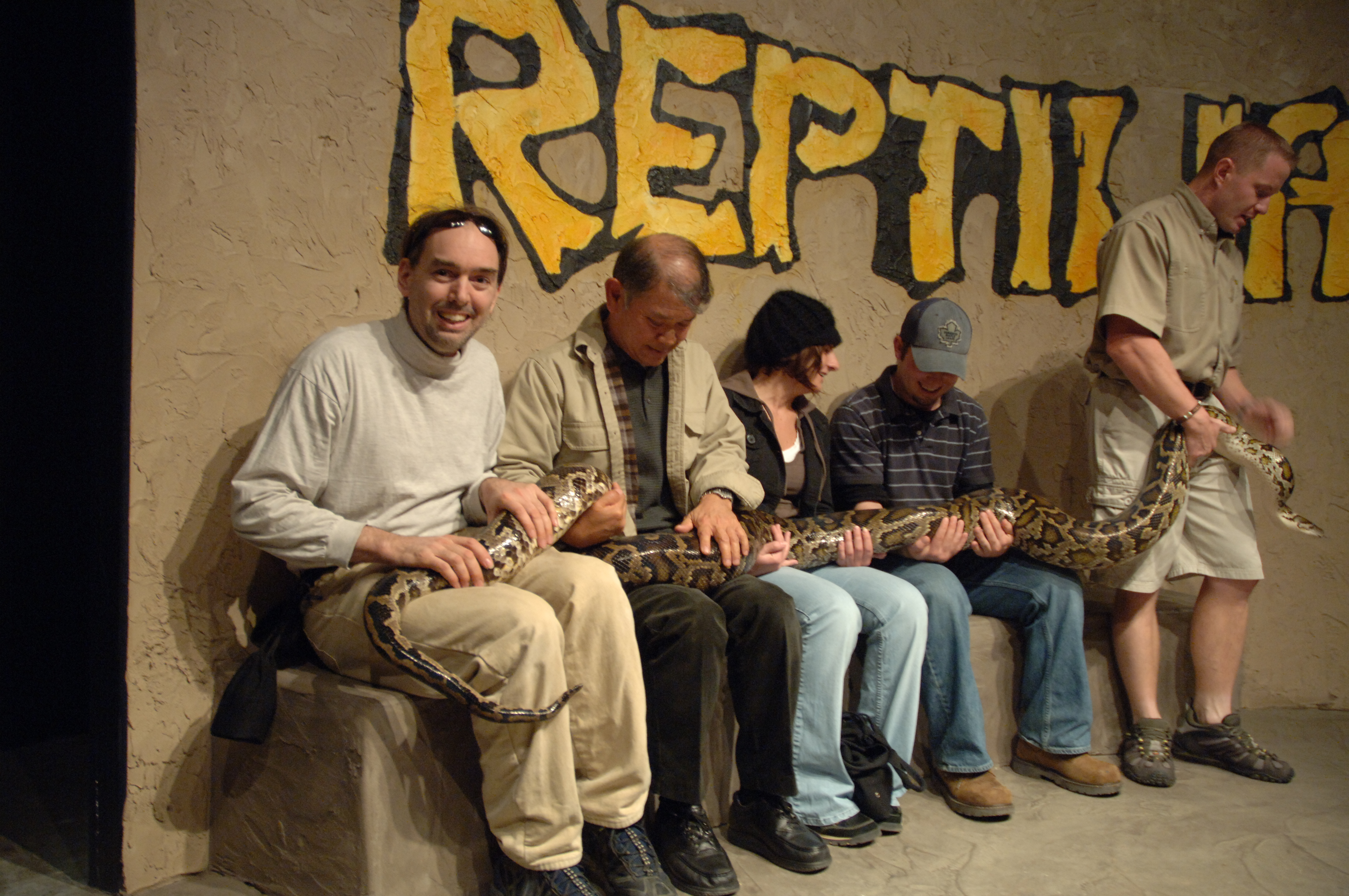
During a live reptile show, volunteers from the audience are requested to assist in the handling of a 5-meter-long (approx. 16-foot) female Burmese python.

About 250 species of reptiles are in the zoo's collection. Among them is Canada's largest crocodile, a 14-foot (4.3 m), 1,200-pound (540 kg) male Nile crocodile named Induna. The zoo also contains 20-foot-long (6.1 m) pythons, anacondas, poison dart frogs, rattlesnakes, and more. About 75% of animals are rescues, with the remainder either born on location or acquired from other accredited facilities. Of the rescues, many are obtained from previous owners who cannot cope with animals that have achieved their adult size, for which the zoo receives "constant calls". The zoo takes in about 75 such animals every year, many of which are later sent to other facilities.

Each location has a theatre area in which the zoo exhibits interactive reptile shows.

== Educational curriculum ==
Reptilia provides curriculum compliant educational programs from kindergarten to grade 12 along with specialized post secondary programs for first responders, educators, animal control officers and veterinarians. Educational programs are provided at Reptilia, as well as through the transportation of reptiles to various schools to provide lessons in school classrooms. Lessons are typically of 1 hour duration.

Reptilia interacts closely with other educational organizations, supplying reptiles and other supplies to the Ontario Science Centre, helping the Toronto Zoo with their educational programs, and working with many of the schools in the Greater Toronto Area. Reptilia also has a number of classrooms and party rooms that can be rented out for activities such as birthday parties. Each room is named after a different reptile.

== Film industry ==
Reptilia provides reptiles along with skilled handlers for film productions, photo shoots, and television. Reptilia has provided reptiles for Guinness, Murdoch Mysteries, Canada's Greatest Know-It-All, YTV, Daily Planet, and other shows and productions.
