= Canada's Greatest Know-It-All =

- Created by: Brad Brough
- Presented by: Daniel Fathers
- Country of origin: Canada
- No. of seasons: 2
- No. of episodes: 18

Production
- Executive producers: Brad Brough and David Brady
- Production locations: near Welland, Ontario
- Running time: 42 minutes
- Production company: Boxing Cats Productions

Original release
- Network: Discovery Channel (Canada)
- Release: January 30, 2012 – present

Canada's Greatest Know-It-All is a reality series that debuted January 30, 2012, on Discovery Channel (Canada).

In the series, ten competitors claim to be "know-it-alls" and compete in a series of challenges. The challengers depend upon practical knowledge of physics, mathematics, and engineering to succeed at the challenges, as well as an ability to overcome the stereotype of know-it-alls, that a know-it-all believes that he or she knows everything and does not depend on other people's knowledge. The series is hosted and narrated by Daniel Fathers.

== Episode format ==
Each episode contains three challenges. All competitors compete in the first two challenges: at the end of each challenge, one competitor is sent to the Danger Zone for the poorest performance. The Danger Zone is the last challenge, at which one competitor succeeds and stays in the competition; the other is eliminated. A ritual at the end of each episode has the eliminated contestant walk over to a switch near a row of light bulbs; flipping the switch causes one light bulb to drop onto the floor.

Most challenges include at least one twist: a detail that is not announced or provided until the challenge is underway or is completed.

In some challenges, the competitors are organized into teams. Teams stay together for one episode.

== Seasons ==
=== Season 1 ===
==== Competitors ====
- Ted Coffey, 56, oil- and gas-drilling consultant.
- Sabina Dawson, 39, accountant.
- Dan Dicaire, 25, energy-efficiency expert.
- Stephen Drooker, 65, high-school teacher, retired.
- Nick Nelson, 32, media producer.
- Cary Lucier, 46, Windsor, Ontario inventor and entrepreneur.
- Thomas Porter, 36, Prince Albert, Saskatchewan photographer.
- Jennifer Salisbury, 33, naval nuclear engineer.
- Wayne Skuhala, 37, carpenter.
- Dave Spencer, 38, millwright.

==== Progress ====
#	Contestants	Episodes							
#	Contestants	1	2	3	4	5	6	7	8
1	Ted	Danger		Danger				Danger	Greatest
2	Dave					Danger		Danger	Runner-Up
3	Wayne				Danger			Danger	Eliminated
4	Jennifer		Danger				Danger	Eliminated	
5	Thomas						Eliminated		
6	Sabina					Eliminated			
7	Dan				Eliminated				
8	Nick			Eliminated					
9	Cary		Eliminated						
10	Stephen	Eliminated							

==== Episodes ====
===== Episode 101: January 30, 2012 =====
- Team 1: Thomas, Jennifer, Stephen, Ted, and Dan.
- Team 2: Cary, Sabina, Nick, Dave, and Wayne.

First Challenge: Each team constructs a small building out of cardboard and twine. The building is perched at the edge of a cliff, and a model pig is placed inside each building. The buildings are subjected to giant fans which try to blow the buildings off the cliff. "The first pig that flies off the cliff," according to the host, "loses."

The Twist: Each team may rotate the opposing team's building in an attempt to make the building more vulnerable to the fans.

The Result: Both teams construct buildings that partially blow off, but neither team's pig flies off, no matter how much power is applied to the fans, and the challenge is called a draw.

Second Challenge: Each team is given ten cutouts, shaped like humans, which are to be placed near a trailer. The trailer is at the centre of twenty concentric-circular zones; the innermost zone is worth 100 points, and the outermost zone is worth 5 points. Each team may place their cutouts anywhere they wish, but at least one must be in the 100-point zone, and at least one each must be in the 95-point zone, 90-point zone, 85-point zone, and 80-point zone. Once the cutouts are placed, the trailer is blown up with dynamite; each team then receives the sum of the points for each cutout that still stands and is not burning.

The Result: Both teams' 100-point, 95-point, 90-point, 85-point, and 80-point cutouts are destroyed or burned, and count for no points. Team 1 earns 85 points (5+10+15+25+30) and Team 2 earns 130 points (20+25+25+30+30). Ted volunteers to compete in the Danger Zone. Because no team lost the first challenge, Ted must nominate one of his teammates for the Danger Zone, and he chooses Stephen.

The Danger Zone: Ted and Stephen have fifteen minutes to earn five merit badges. To earn a merit badge, he must complete a task to the satisfaction of a Scoutmaster.

The Result: Ted completes four and Stephen completes two. Stephen drops the first light bulb to represent his elimination.

===== Episode 102: February 6, 2012 =====
- Team 1: Thomas, Wayne, Jennifer, Nick, and Dave.
- Team 2: Dan, Ted, Sabina, and Cary.

The First Challenge: Each team is given a storage container and fifty boxes. Each box contains two labels: one label on one side names a product (for example, Vasanti Soft Finish Matte Lipstick with Anti-Oxidants), and the other label on the opposite side names a "related" product (for example, Guerlain KissKiss Gold and Diamonds Lipstick). All the boxes must be placed in the storage container with the label naming the more expensive product facing the opening of the storage container. The prices of the products that the team deems to be more expensive are totalled, and the larger total wins the challenge.

The Trick: The difference in retail value of some pairs is larger than it appears. The announced value of the Vasanti Lipstick is $15; the announced value of the Guerlain Lipstick is $62000.

The Result: Team 2 wins this challenge. Team 1 must choose one member for the Danger Zone as described below. Cary Suffers "Heat Stroke" on the first day of competition and has to be persuaded to staying in the competition. This fact is never aired to the public but the footage is used to make Cary look like he didn't support his team.

The Second Challenge: Each team has $1000 with which to buy supplies; with these supplies, each team must build a boat capable of hauling all four team members and a quantity of sand. These boats are to be used in two heats to transport a thousand pounds of sand, in one or more trips, to an island in the middle of a pond.

The Trick: For the first heat, each team must give its supplies to the opposing team and build its first boat from the opponents' supplies. The second boat must be built from their own supplies.

Balancing The Teams: Team 1 must choose one member to sit out the second challenge. Because Team 1 lost the first challenge, the member that sits out must compete in the Danger Zone. Team 1 nominates Jennifer.

The Result: Team 2 falls behind early, and after one trip, Cary sits out. This forces Team 2 to forfeit the challenge to Team 1, but both teams complete the challenge anyway. Cary offers himself up to compete in the Danger Zone.

The Danger Zone: Jennifer and Cary are each stationed beside a conveyor belt. For the first round, they must memorize a list of three items, then pick those three items from the conveyor belt, one at a time. The second round is similar to the first, but the list has four items. A five-item, six-item, and seven-item round is played similarly.

The Result: Jennifer picks more items than Cary. Cary must break a second light bulb to signal his elimination.

===== Episode 103: February 13, 2012 =====
- Team 1: Sabina, Dan, Dave, and Wayne.
- Team 2: Jennifer, Ted, Nick, and Thomas.

The First Challenge: Each team is given a block of ice in which plastic replicas of human bones are buried. Each team must get the bones out of the block of ice and assemble them into a skeleton within an hour. The total of the most bones extricated and most assembled correctly into a skeleton wins the challenge.

The Trick: Each team is given a set of tools with which to break the ice, but not an icepick. An icepick is added to each team's set of tools after about twenty minutes; each team must recognize that the new tool is an icepick in order to make the challenge easier.

The Result: Sabina's team wins the challenge with the most bones extracted. Jennifer's team nominates Ted for the Danger Zone. (Production note: Jennifer's team is called "Team 2" at the start of the episode, but is called "Team 1" at the end of the first challenge.)

The Second Challenge: This challenge consists of four driving challenges, reminiscent of another Discovery Channel series, Canada's Worst Driver. Wayne and Nick must park a 20-foot-long limousine between large rocks. Jennifer and Dan must drive a pickup truck on a stretch of railway (although the rails are actually made of wood), first forward and then backward. Sabina and Ted must make a three-point turn in a school bus, between pylons. Dave and Thomas must drive a large dump truck backwards through a course marked by pylons, and try to put a plumb bob at the back of the truck over a target. Each driver starts with 50 points, and five points are deducted for falling off the rails, for hitting rocks, or for hitting pylons.

The Result: Jennifer's team loses this challenge. Nick's performance was the worst (he scored 15 out of 50, or 30%), and he must compete in the Danger Zone.

The Danger Zone: Ted and Nick are shown thirty-six questions posted on a board. (for example, "What is the only mammal that cannot jump?"). In turns, each competitor asks one of the questions to his opponent. However, the questioner must choose a question to which he knows the answer. One point is awarded for a correct answer; one point is awarded to the answerer if neither he nor the questioner can answer the question. The game is played best-ten-out-of-nineteen.

The Result: Ted wins the round 10 to 5. Nick must break a third light bulb.

===== Episode 104: February 20, 2012 =====
- No Teams: The contestants compete individually in this episode.

The First Challenge: Each competitor must direct a Lancaster ("the most famous Allied bomber of World War II") to drop a "bomb" on a limousine, "parked 1080 feet from the base of this giant gravel mound." The Lancaster flies at 172 miles per hour (150 knots) over the gravel mound and then the limousine, at 400 feet above the pit floor. Each contestant is in radio contact with the pilot and must order "drop, drop, now!" to release the bomb. Contestants do not see the results of other competitors drops until after their own attempt.

The Result: Dave, the last competitor, comes closest at 15 metres. Dan, the furthest away at 187 meters, is in the Danger Zone.

The Second Challenge: The competitors are given a lecture on reptiles from Andre Ngo, Ph.D., curator of the Reptilia zoo.

The Twist: The actual challenge is to improvise a ten-minute lesson to approximately 100 elementary-school students. The students and Dr. Ngo rank the competitors. Additionally, Dan must not finish last or he is eliminated without a Danger Zone challenge.

The Result: Wayne is judged the worst competitor.

The Danger Zone: Dan and Wayne must build, in three hours, a model aircraft of styrofoam, one of plastic, and one of wood and cardboard. Each plane is thrown once by its creator from a height of 55 feet in a hangar. The total distance flown by the three determines the winner and the loser.

The Twist: Unbeknownst to Dan and Wayne, the other five competitors are collaborating on building three planes.

The Result: Wayne's planes fly a total of 192 ft. Dan's planes fly a total of 103 feet. If the team's planes do not fly a total of 103 feet, Dan wins a reprieve and is not eliminated. However, the team's planes manage 151 feet and Dan breaks the fourth light bulb.

===== Episode 105: February 27, 2012 =====
- Team 1: Sabina, Jennifer, and Dave.
- Team 2: Wayne, Thomas, and Ted.

The First Challenge: Each team must jump a car off a ramp. Each team determines which car to use: a Pontiac Sunfire, a Chevrolet Lumina, or a Lincoln Town Car. Each team decides how fast the car will go (from 30 km/h to 65 km/h) and how high the ramp will be (up to one metre), and must figure out where the car will land in front of the ramp; this position is marked as a spray-painted X and is called their target.

The Result: Team 2 uses the Lumina, running at 65 km/h towards a 44-inch-high ramp, choose to place their X 42.6 feet beyond the ramp. They predict this target based on gut feeling rather than calculation. The Lumina manages to jump 22 feet beyond their target. Team 1 uses the Sunfire, also at 65 km/h but with a 32-inch ramp height, and place their target 63 feet in front of the ramp; their car falls 25 feet short of their target. Dave volunteers to put himself in the Danger Zone.

The Second Challenge:

In Stage One, each team must build a small trebuchet that fires a baseball a distance of twenty metres. Once a team completes Stage One, they may proceed to Stage Two.

In Stage Two, the teams use a larger, prebuilt trebuchet to fire basketballs at a rim, three metres in diameter and fifteen metres above the ground. The value of a basket depends upon the distance that the trebuchet is from the rim. The first team to complete Stage One has a full two hours to shoot basketballs; the other team only has the time from when they complete Stage One until the other team's two hours are up.

The Trick: The release pin on each trebuchet is loose, and gets looser with each shot unless the team notices the pin and readjusts it.

The Result: Team 1 is first out, while Team 2 loses 20 minutes until they complete Stage One. Team 2 scores two baskets at 20 metres and 30 metres. Team 1 fails to score. Jennifer puts Sabina in the Danger Zone.

The Danger Zone: There are 96 discs, each marked with a symbol. Dave and Sabina each have a board containing the meaning of nine symbols ("biohazard", "no admittance with pacemaker", "Earth", "Mercury", "euro", "anarchy" (Ⓐ), "biohazard", "power" (actually the standby symbol), and the "rod of Asclepius"); they must fetch the disc with the symbol and match it with its meaning. The discs are coloured orange and white; Sabina must take only orange discs and Dave must take only white discs. Once a competitor matches all nine, the meaning of a tenth symbol is revealed. This symbol has only one disc; whoever gets that disc, regardless of colour, wins.

The Result: Dave solves all nine symbols, then finds the "victory" symbol (a laurel wreath) to win. Sabina breaks a fifth light bulb.

===== Episode 106: March 5, 2012 =====
- No Teams: The contestants compete individually in this episode.

The First Challenge: The five remaining Know-It-Alls accompany a group of (approximately forty) tourists on a jet-boat ride down the Niagara River. During the boat ride, the guide recites "a hundred facts" about the Niagara River and its history.

The Twist: The host conducts a twenty-question pop quiz on the facts that the guide has recited to them.

The Result: Dave scores the worst on the pop-quiz, which puts him temporarily in the Danger Zone. The host announces that, if Dave finishes the second challenge in first place, he is out of the Danger Zone and the two worst competitors in the second challenge are in the Danger Zone.

The Second Challenge: In Stage One of the challenge, each competitor must demonstrate CPR on a practice dummy. A panel of three rescue experts grade each competitor.

The Twist:

Only after all competitors complete the first stage does the host announce that there is a second stage, which is the actual challenge that determines the competitors for the Danger Zone: Each competitor must act as the first responder to the scene of a simulated accident.

Five vehicles are involved in the simulated accident. A scooter has been hit by a tanker truck, and the scooter's driver lies injured, but conscious, on the ground. A pickup truck has struck the tanker truck, and is smoking (but not actually on fire); the pickup's passenger is unconscious. A station wagon has struck a "hydro pole" which now lies on top of the car with potentially live wires touching the ground. Finally, another car has flipped over, and its driver has been ejected and lies unconscious on the ground.

The Result: Thomas and Wayne actually touch the station wagon with the "live" wires, which would have resulted in their death by electrocution. Jennifer actually touches the "live" wire and sets the unconscious pickup passenger on it. Ted moves the unconscious driver of the flipped car, which could paralyze her. Dave handles the entire situation without getting "electrocuted" and without risking paralysis. The final grades assigned are 77% for Dave, 65% for Wayne, 53% for Ted, 50% for Thomas and 45% for Jennifer.

The Danger Zone: Jennifer and Thomas must solve four tangram puzzles: the candle, the mountain, the fish, and the swan. The puzzles are in a cage; each competitor must determine the four-digit combination of a padlock to enter the cage, and another to exit the cage. Thomas completes only the candle; Jennifer completes all four. Thomas breaks the sixth light bulb.

===== Episode 107: March 12, 2012 =====
- Team 1: Ted and Wayne.
- Team 2: Jennifer and Dave.

The First Challenge: Teams must guess the number of objects that a bullet can penetrate. The team that is the closer without going under wins the round; if both guesses are under, neither team wins the round.

Round One: A 2.5-inch Full Metal Jacket round is fired from a .300 Winchester Magnum at steaks of beef, each one inch thick and frozen and backed by a half-inch sheet of plywood. Jennifer and Dave guess that the bullet will be stopped by the fourth steak, while Ted and Wayne guess that the bullet will be stopped by the eleventh. The bullet is stopped by the seventh steak, giving round one to Ted and Wayne.

Round Two: A lead bullet is fired from a black-powder musket at half-inch sheets of plywood. Jennifer and Dave guess four (again) and Ted and Wayne guess eleven (again), but the bullet goes through all eleven sheets and neither team wins this round.

Round Three: A .308-caliber Full Metal Jacket is fired from a Browning 1919A6 at reams of letter-size computer-printer paper. Jennifer and Dave guess eight and Ted and Wayne choose fourteen; the bullet is stopped by the fourth, so Jennifer and Dave win the round.

Round Four (tiebreaker): For the tiebreaker, the closest guess, over or under, wins. A .308-caliber Full Metal Jacket is fired from a Browning 1919A6 at half-inch sheets of plywood. Jennifer and Dave guess 14, and Ted and Wayne guess 18. The bullet is stopped by the twenty-fourth sheet, so Ted and Wayne win.

The Second Challenge: Teams are each given a dune buggy and must complete four laps.

The First Trick: Seven parts are removed from each buggy, and the team must put them back on before racing.

The Second Trick: Based on the stereotypical boast, "I could do this with one hand tied behind my back", each competitor has his or her dominant hand tied behind his or her back. The team must put their dune buggy back together before the host cuts them free.

The Third Trick: Based on another stereotypical boast, "I could do this blindfolded", one member of each team must drive the first lap without being able to see; their teammate must direct their driving verbally.

The Fourth Trick: Based on a third stereotypical boast, "I could do this backwards", the passenger on the first lap must drive the second lap backwards, using only the mirrors. Once the second lap is completed, each team member drives one more lap in the normal way and as fast as possible.

The Result: Jennifer and Dave win this challenge. The host declares that all four will compete in the Danger Zone as a result.

The Danger Zone: Each competitor faces a ten-question multiple-choice quiz about things that they learned throughout the series thus far. Each question has four choices, which are printed on four sides of a giant block. The competitors must place these blocks with the correct answer facing out in a pyramid shape, then stand on top of the pyramid. If the competitor is wrong on at least one question, he or she is only told "wrong" and must change at least one answer. After thirty minutes, the host no longer merely says "wrong" but says which questions have been answered incorrectly.

The Result: All four competitors cannot solve their pyramids within the thirty minutes. Jennifer is slowest; she breaks the seventh light bulb and is eliminated.

===== Episode 108: March 19, 2012 =====
The First Challenge: Wayne, Dave, and Ted must navigate a field of 100 discs in the Know-It-All Pit. Each has a set of five discs, and sixteen questions to answer to figure out the path from one disc to the next. The first two to reach their fifth disc (which has a picture of a key on it) drive a dune buggy out of the pit and into the finals; the third is eliminated. A contestant who picks up an incorrect disc (a blank disc or a competitor's disc) incurs a two-minute penalty.

The Result: Ted finishes first. Dave finishes second, and makes the dramatic gesture of commiserating with the now-eliminated Wayne, who incurs more than ten two-minute penalties and never solves the directions on his starting disc.

The Second Challenge: Dave and Ted must navigate a car from the pit back to their hotel. They may turn either left or right from the pit exit, and may make further left turns without penalty, but the contestant incurs a five-kilometre penalty for each right turn. The contestant who arrives at the hotel in the shorter distance, after penalties, goes into the third challenge with 100 points; the other goes in with 100 points minus two points per kilometre above the first contestant's distance.

The Twist: The quickest way to the hotel is a left turn out of the pit, followed by an unavoidable right turn; a contestant must be willing to incur one five-kilometre penalty.

The Result: Ted turns right from the pit, but gets lost and has to make one right turn, incurring 5 km total in penalties. Dave turns left from the pit and must take the unavoidable right turn, but his concentration lapses and he misses an exit, causing him to take two more right turns; he incurs 15 km total in penalties. Both travel 45.9 km to the hotel, so the challenge is decided on penalties; Ted's total is 50.9 km (for the full 100 points) and Dave's total is 60.9 km (for 80 points).

The Third Challenge: Dave and Ted face ten questions from a jury of "a hundred people" who applied for the show, but failed to make it. The host then poses additional questions. It is announced that 150 points are riding on this final challenge, but how the points are awarded is never specified.

The Twist: When Dave claims that diamonds were the most dense, Ted jokes "No, Cary was." Unbeknownst to Dave or Ted, Cary, the contestant eliminated in episode 102, is seated among the jury. He asks, "What makes you so special that you deserve to be Canada's Greatest Know-It-All?" Ted and Dave refuse to answer Cary, but must answer a similar question from the host.

The Result: Dave is voted as runner-up, making Ted Canada's Greatest Know-It-All.

=== Season 2 ===
==== Competitors ====
- Abraham (Abe) Qammaniq, Hall Beach, Nunavut
- Andrew Rader, Ottawa, Ontario
- Ben Eadie, Calgary, Alberta
- Bill Robinson, Madeira Park, British Columbia
- Carla Davidson, Calgary, Alberta
- Doug Hicton, Toronto, Ontario
- Laura Suen, Mississauga, Ontario
- Owen Garratt, Spruce Grove, Alberta
- Scott Gravelle, Calgary, Alberta

==== Progress ====
Andrew has earned the title of Canada's Greatest Know-It-All for season 2, beating out Carla in the final challenge extravaganza.

#	Contestants	Episodes							
#	Contestants	1	2	3	4	5	6	7	8
1	Andrew						Danger		Greatest
2	Carla							Danger	Runner-Up
3	Owen					Danger			Eliminated
4	Scott							Eliminated	
5	Laura						Eliminated		
6	Ben	Danger		Danger	Danger	Eliminated			
7	Beth				Eliminated				
8	Doug		Danger	Eliminated					
9	Abe		Eliminated						
10	Bill	Eliminated							
