= Design Interns =

Canadian reality show

Design Interns is a Canadian reality television series, which aired on HGTV Canada in 2006. Hosted by designers Anna Simone and Elaine Cecconi, the series featured 12 young designers competing in various design challenges to win a professional internship at the hosts' design firm Cecconi Simone.

Simone stated that she had often been frustrated by home renovation and design television shows depicting "renovations that are achieved in impossibly short times for impossibly small amounts of money", and said she decided to work on the series because she wanted to show that the job was much more complex and challenging than many viewers thought it was.

The show premiered on October 3, 2006. It was won by Cynthia Soda, a designer from Stouffville.

The series was a Gemini Award nominee for Canadian Screen Award for Best Reality/Competition Series at the 22nd Gemini Awards in 2007.
