= Best Trip Ever =

Canadian television special

Best. Trip. Ever. is a Canadian television special, which aired November 27, 2010 on Discovery Channel Canada. Filmed by Castlewood Productions in the summer following Jon Montgomery's gold-medal skeleton performance at the 2010 Winter Olympics, the special featured Montgomery and his friends Darla Deschamps, Kelly Forbes and Sarah Reid on a road trip to try out various other adventure sports, including kite surfing, uphill endurance sprinting and extreme mountain biking, in various locations around British Columbia.

The program was originally conceived as a series, although only the one special was ultimately produced or aired.

The special received three Gemini Award nominations at the 26th Gemini Awards in 2011, for Best Reality Series, Best Photography in an Information Program or Series (Marlon Paul and Scott Wilson) and Best Picture Editing in an Information Program or Series (Clark Masters and Richard Rotter). It won the award for Best Picture Editing.
