= Richard Ryder (comedian) =

Canadian comedian and broadcaster (born 1966)

Richard Ryder (born 1966) is a Canadian comedian and broadcaster, best known as a host of programming on Toronto, Ontario radio station Proud FM and national cable television channel OutTV. He was a morning host on Proud FM, and his work for OutTV has included the reality series Knock Knock Ghost and weekly RuPaul's Drag Race commentaries recorded in character as drag queen Wilma Fingerdoo.

He regularly tours throughout Ontario as a performer at LGBT Pride and other LGBTQ-related comedy events.
