= The Property Shop =

Canadian television program

The Property Shop is a Canadian television HGTV "docu-soap" that follows the realtor Tatiana Londono, as she opens her own realty agency in Montreal.
