= Knock Knock Ghost =

Canadian reality television series

Knock Knock Ghost is a Canadian reality television series, which premiered on OutTV in 2015. Hosted by comedian Richard Ryder, the series features Ryder and actress Brie Doyle, as well as a psychic medium (paranormal researcher Jim Hunt in the first two seasons and Kevin Whitaker in season three). The group travels to various locations across Canada which are purported to be haunted and conducts experiments to test whether it is possible to prove or disprove the existence of the afterlife.

The series was nominated for Best Reality or Competition Program or Series at the 5th Canadian Screen Awards in 2017 and at the 7th Canadian Screen Awards in 2019.

== Episodes ==
=== Season one (2015) ===
Richard Ryder, Brie Doyle, Jim Hunt

1. “Tunnel of Terror”: Fort George at Niagara-on-the-Lake, Ontario. Guests Dan Laroche and Kyle Upton. Oct 31 2015.
2. “The Grand Theatre": Grand Theatre (London, Ontario) at London, Ontario. Guests Kara James and Tim Whitty. Nov 7 2015.
3. “Howling Winds”: Fort Henry at Kingston, Ontario. Guests Mark Bennett and Meghan Belanger. Nov 15 2015.
4. “The Inn at the Falls”: Bracebridge, Ontario. Guest Joanne Mantell. Nov 22 2015.
5. “Blythewood Manor”: Niagara Falls, Ontario. Guests Michelle Desrochers and Wayne Mallows. Nov 29 2015.
6. “St. Thomas Psychiatric Ward”: St. Thomas, Ontario. Guest Stan Krieger and security staff. Dec 5 2015.

=== Season two (2017-2018) ===
Richard Ryder, Brie Doyle, Jim Hunt

1. “Huron Historic Gaol, Goderich”: Huron Historic Gaol at Goderich, Ontario. Guest Elizabeth French-Gibson. Nov 9 2017.
2. “The Towers, Hamilton”: Scottish Rite Castle at Queen Street (Hamilton, Ontario). Guests Ken Adamson and Daniel Cumerlato. Nov 16 2017.
3. “Fort Malden, Amherstburg”: Fort Malden at Amherstburg, Ontario. Guest John Macleod. Nov 23 2017.
4. “HMCS Haida, Hamilton”: HMCS Haida at Hamilton, Ontario. Guests Neil Bell, Joanne Brideson, Sarah Simpson, Jim Brewer, and Marg Mathers. Oct 17 2018.
5. “L’Orignal Jail, L’Orignal”: L'Orignal Jail at L'Orignal, Ontario. Guest Emma Calvert. Oct 25 2018.
6. “Old Fort Erie”: Old Fort Erie at Fort Erie, Ontario. Guest Travis Hall. Oct 31 2018.

=== Season three (2020) ===
Richard Ryder, Brie Doyle, Kevin Whitaker

1. “The Lang Pioneer Village". Lang Pioneer Village Museum in Keene (Otonabee–South Monaghan), Ontario. Guest Laurie Siblock (museum manager). Nov 5 2020.
2. “The Diefenbunker Museum". Diefenbunker Museum (Emergency Government Headquarters) in Carp, Ontario. Guest Craig Humphrey (facility manager). Nov 12 2020.
3. “The Orillia Opera House". Orillia Opera House in Orillia, Ontario. Guests Max Cane (technical supervisor) and Ashley Whitten (stage technician). Nov 19 2020.
4. “The Ottawa Jail Hostel". Ottawa Jail Hostel in Ottawa, Ontario. Guests Erin Henry (experience curator) and Natasha White (The Haunted Walk Ottawa guide). Nov 26 2020.
5. “The Discovery Harbour". Discovery Harbour in Penetanguishene, Ontario. Guests Dave Brunelle, Michael Serafin, and Larry Ford. Dec 3 2020.
6. “The Ruthven National Historic Site". Ruthven Park National Historic Site in Cayuga, Haldimand County, Ontario. Guests Nancy Van Sas and Joel Weaver (maintenance engineer). Dec 10 2020.
