= From the Ground Up with Debbie Travis =

From the Ground Up with Debbie Travis was a Canadian reality television series, which aired on Global, HGTV and TVtropolis. The series was a design competition hosted by interior designer Debbie Travis.

== Season 1 ==
In the first cycle, Travis bought a house and tore it down. The show's 12 protégés were then challenged to turn the building's remaining skeleton into a fully decorated home to be sold. $250,000 of the profits from the sale of the home is to be given to one protégé, as voted by the viewers.

Contestants in the first season were Cory St. Croix, Jodi Fernandes, Lynsey Bennett, Robert Rames, Ryan Lucier, Stephanie Parris, Jacqueline Lahaise, Leah Thurston, Mike Fournier, Ryan Anderson, Sheldon Robertson and Tran Nguyen.

The series was produced in 2005 and aired in spring 2006.

Airing in America in Fine Living Network and HGTV.

== Season 2 ==
In season 2, the goal of the 14 protégés was to complete design tasks to become the chief designer on a new Debbie Travis branded condominium. Dvira Ovadia, an interior designer from Toronto, was the winner of Season 2. This cycle originally aired on Global Television in the spring of 2007 and then HGTV in 2008, as well as in the United States on Fine Living in the summer of 2008.
