= Owen Garratt =

Canadian artist and musician

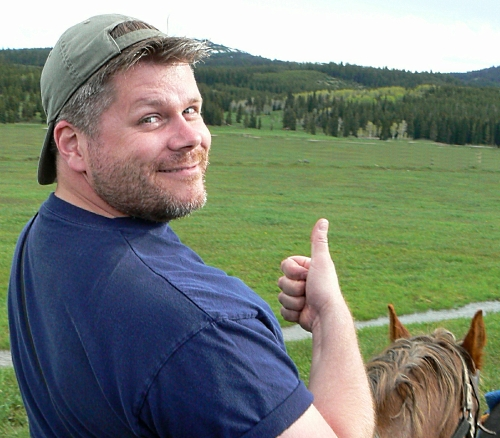
The artist on a horse.

Owen “Pencilneck” Garratt (born 1968) is an artist and musician born in Saskatchewan, Canada.

== Personal life ==
Owen Garratt was born in Regina, Saskatchewan, the only child of Gary and Susan Garratt. Gary and Susan divorced in 1971 and Owen lived with his mother until her death in a plane crash in January, 1982. He then moved to Wawota, Saskatchewan to live with his father, who farmed and worked on oil rigs. His father's involvement in the oil drilling industry established the ties that would lead to Owen being persuaded to draw oilfield-related pictures later in his career.

Owen attended high school in Wawota until his graduation in 1986. Upon graduation from high school, Garratt returned to Regina to attend the local university. After a year he left university to study music at a nearby vocational music school for two years. He then moved to Calgary, Alberta, drumming with various musical groups throughout his twenties In between musical gigs, he took a sales job selling artwork and met his future wife, Karla Elder. Garratt returned to Regina in 1995 – marrying Karla Elder in 2000. His wife became pregnant with the couple's first child, Jackson, in 2001 and they relocated to Spruce Grove, Alberta, 11 kilometres to the east of Edmonton – Alberta’s capital city. They produced two more sons, Hudson Garratt in 2002 and Harding Garratt in 2005. Jackson Garratt died due to choking in 2003.

Owen was a contestant on season two of "Canada's Greatest Know-it-All" on Discovery in 2013, and placed third in the season finale.

== Music career ==
Owen Garratt began drumming at high-school in Wawota. At 15 he began a two-week European tour with a combined U.S. – Canadian concert band, and at age 18 was awarded a scholarship to attend a music camp in Evje, Norway. After attending college he went on to play with various bands throughout the late 1980s and early 1990s. Although Garratt is now a full-time artist, he still devotes some of his time to playing music. He has recently been involved in co-writing and recording the music for a reality TV show, centred on his own life.

Garratt is also the Drum Sergeant for the Spruce Grove Fire-fighter's Pipe and Drum Band.

== Artistic career ==
Due to partial color-blindness , Garratt creates black and white drawings using graphite, chalk and charcoal. His subjects are largely taken from North American culture – featuring the oil and gas industries, agricultural scenes, and wild life. He is entirely self-taught, beginning his professional career as an artist after the drawing he produced for his grandmother – as a Christmas present – was criticised by his then-girlfriend. Garratt believes that “The world wants its artists to climb above the tree-line, slay the dragon, and come back to tell the tale.”

In 2007, Garratt won a $10,000 first prize at the Los Angeles TV festival with test footage based on a tentative reality TV show called “The Tales of The Pencilneck ”, which features Owen engaging in various adventures and creating a piece of art based on the experiences.
