= Debbie Travis =

Television personality, self-taught interior decorator, and former fashion model

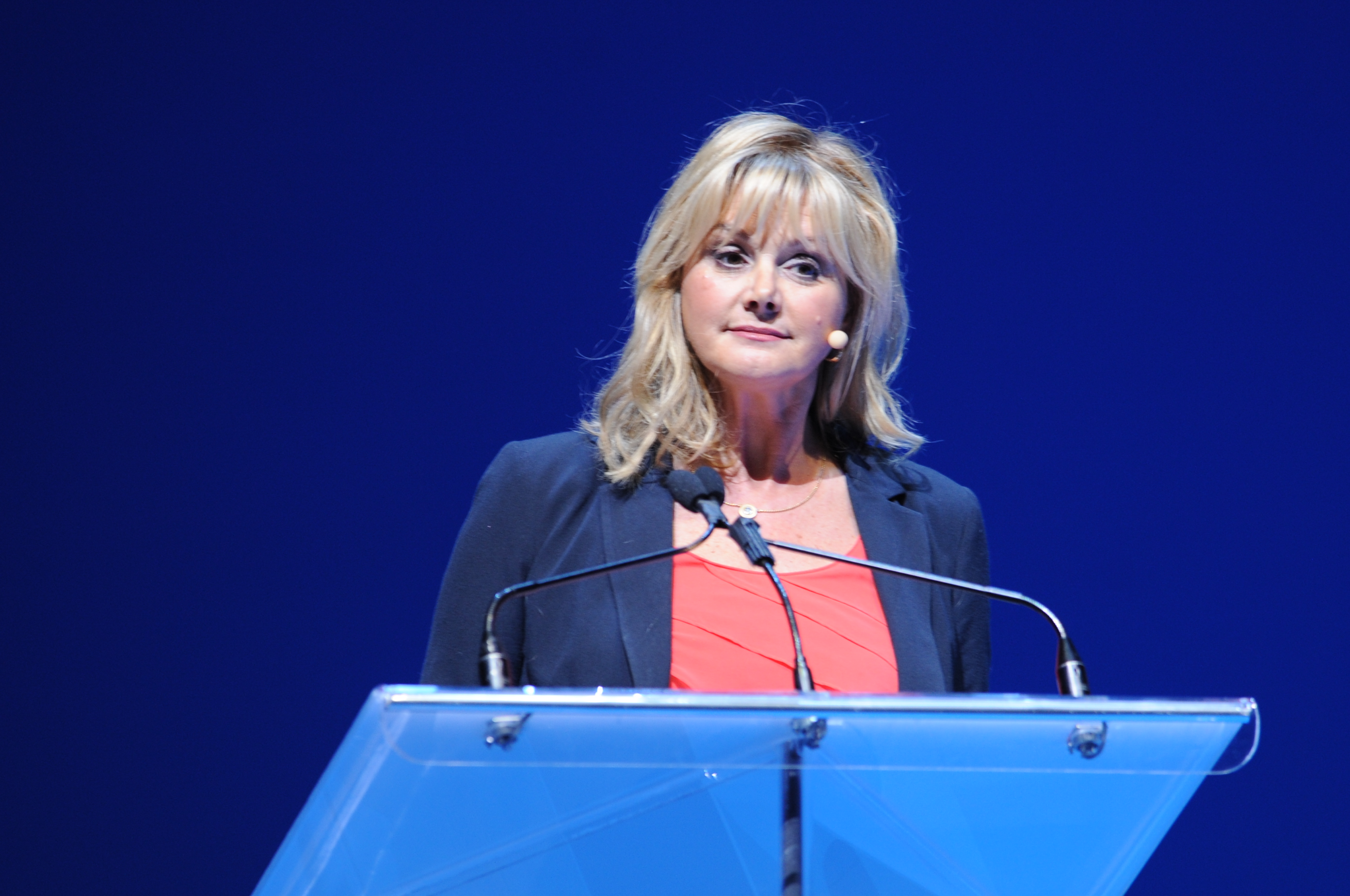
- Travis at the 2013 Randstad Awards
- Born: 27 June 1960 (age 66); Blackburn, Lancashire, England
- Occupations: Interior designer; television host
- Years active: 2003–present
- Spouse: Hans Rosenstein
- Website: DebbieTravis.com

Debbie Travis (born 27 June 1960) is a British-Canadian television personality, self-taught interior decorator, and former fashion model. She is best known as the host of Debbie Travis' Facelift and Debbie Travis' Painted HouseFrom The Ground Up' 'All For One' and 'La Dolce Vita.' Her shows aired worldwide. Travis has authored 12 books all published by Random House.

== Early career ==
Travis grew up in Rochdale, Lancashire/Greater Manchester. After a 6-year adult-modelling career, she worked in television as a freelance editor and producer. Travis met her future husband Hans Rosenstein, a television distributor, in 1986 during a visit to a television buyers' market in Cannes. They married soon after and moved to Montreal, Quebec, Canada.

After redecorating her old Victorian house using paint effects, Travis formed a small decorating business which quickly grew to include commissions from large department stores, auditoriums, theatres, and grand reception halls. Her work attracted media attention, and Travis opened a small studio to teach workshops to both professional decorators and homeowners. She later produced an instructional video entitled Decorative Paint Finishes Made Easy, and later produced three additional, more advanced instructional videos, available in both French and English.

== Television ==
=== Hosting ===
Travis hosted Debbie Travis' Painted House from 1995 to 2002, airing on the Women's Television Network (later W Network). Travis was awarded fourGemini Awards for the series.

In 2006, Travis hosted From The Ground Up with Debbie Travis on Global TV for two seasons. In 2010, Travis hosted the series All for One on CBC Television.

In December 2010, Travis hosted the CBC show Corrie Crazy: Canada Loves Coronation Street, exploring Canadians' love of the British TV series Coronation Street.

=== Production ===
Travis and Hans Rosenstein are partners in the production company Whalley-Abbey Media, which has produced all the Debbie Travis-branded television shows. She is also a partner and executive producer along with Kit Redmond and Hans Rosenstein for RTR Media in Toronto. She has served as an executive producer for all Whalley-Abbey and RTR Media productions, including Buy Me, Property Shop, Income Property and Maxed Out, Chuck's Day Off,

== Print media ==
Travis is also known for her weekly syndicated column which appears in many newspapers and is titled Debbie Travis House to Home, to which readers often write in to have their decorating questions answered.

Travis has authored 8 books on decorating and painting techniques. Her 9th book, Not Guilty is an autobiographical book on parenting. Then followed her bestselling books Design Your Next Chapter, JOY Life Lessons from a Tuscan villa and her latest Laugh More. All published by Random House.

== Products ==
In 2005, Travis launched her own paint and home products line available from Canadian Tire and continues as president of the branding company, Debbie Travis Branding, Inc., located in Toronto. A fine wine collection bearing her name was released in 2016.

== Bibliography ==
- Debbie Travis' Painted House: Quick and Easy Painted Finishes for Walls, Floors, and Furniture Using Water-Based Paints (1997); ISBN 978-0609601556
- Debbie Travis' Decorating Solutions: More Than 65 Paint and Plaster Finishes for Every Room in Your Home (1999); ISBN 978-0609602515
- Debbie Travis' Weekend Projects: More Than 55 One-of-a-Kind Designs You Can Make in Under Two Days (2000); ISBN 978-0609602508
- Debbie Travis' Painted House Living and Dining Rooms: 60 Stylish Projects to Transform Your Home (2001); ISBN 0609805509
- Debbie Travis' Painted House: More than 35 Quick and Easy Finishes for Walls, Floors, and Furniture (2002); ISBN 0609808168
- Debbie Travis' Painted House Kids' Rooms: More than 80 Innovative Projects from Cradle to College (2002); ISBN 0609805517
- Debbie Travis' Painted House Bedrooms: More Than 40 Inspiring Projects for Your Personal Sanctuary (2002); ISBN 978-0609805480
- Debbie Travis' Painted House Kitchens and Baths: More than 50 Innovative Projects for an Exciting New Look at Any Budget (2003); ISBN 978-0609805497
- Debbie Travis' Facelift: Solutions to Revitalize Your Home (2005); ISBN 978-1400081530
- Not Guilty: My Guide to Working Hard, Raising Kids and Laughing through the Chaos (2009); ISBN 978-0307357236
