= Debbie Travis' Facelift =

Canadian home improvement reality television show (2003–05)

- Genre: Home improvement
- Presented by: Debbie Travis
- Country of origin: Canada
- No. of seasons: 4

Original release
- Network: HGTV
- Release: January 28, 2003 – December 30, 2005

Debbie Travis' Facelift was a home improvement reality television show that ran from January 28, 2003, to December 30, 2005. It was produced in Canada for HGTV and also aired in the United States on the American version of the network, Home & Garden Television. It is hosted by interior designer Debbie Travis, and was based out of Montreal, Quebec.

The show's format is that of a surprise renovation; a family member or loved one contacts the show to arrange a 'facelift' of a part of the home for the unsuspecting target(s). By taking advantage of the target's absence (or arranging a pretense for it), the 'Facelift team' moves in for the duration to renovate as quickly as possible. Much of the show's drama is based around time and budget constraints in completing the job before the target returns, and upon the reaction of the target once they see the completed work.

The personalities of members of the team have become well known to regular viewers, along with such trademarks as the "Sivart van" (an old-style delivery truck labeled sivart, 'Travis' spelled in reverse), which the team arrives in; Debbie's reveal of a possibly-controversial design to skeptical family members; and the 'facelift book', a small scrapbook presented to the target after the renovation is revealed, showing what they missed during their absence.

Some 'twists' that have occurred on various episodes include the target returning early, unexpectedly; vital materials not arriving on time, forcing the team to improvise; and dissatisfied targets demanding a change to the renovation scheme.

== Episodes ==
=== Season 1 ===
Date	Title
2003-01-28	Jan & Andy's Kitchen
2003-02-04	Tim & Julie's Living Room
2003-02-11	Cathy's Living/Dining Room
2003-02-18	Suzanne's Kitchen
2003-02-25	Donato's Bedroom
2003-03-04	Cindy's Living/Dining Room
2003-03-11	Shelley's Bedroom
2003-03-18	Ivars' Garage
2003-04-01	Gregory's Bedroom
2003-04-08	MC's Office
2003-04-15	Karen's Basement
2003-04-21	Elsy's New Home
2003-04-29	Sian's Garden

=== Season 2 ===
Date	Title
2003-09-14	Nadia's Basement
2003-09-21	Glenn's Kitchen
2003-09-28	Lawrence's Kids' Rooms
2003-10-12	Christine's Bedroom
2003-10-26	Marilyn's Living Room
2003-11-02	Karen's Kitchen & Den
2003-11-23	Sigal's Den
2003-11-30	Emma's Bachelorette
2003-12-07	Christmas Show
2004-01-04	DJ's Garden
2004-01-18	Olive's Kitchen
2004-02-01	Mrs. Biggs' Bedroom
2004-02-15	Luigi's New Home
2004-02-22	Debbie's Bedroom & Bath

=== Season 3 ===
Date	Title
2004-07-02	The Honeymooners
2004-07-09	Nico's Bachelor Pad
2004-07-23	Sonia's Basement
2004-07-30	The In-Laws
2004-08-07	Karen's Cottage
2004-10-01	The Sisters' Bedroom
2004-11-12	Toni's Bedroom
2004-11-14	Jennifer's Living Room
2004-12-05	Penny & Nancy's Cottage
2005-01-02	Bob's Deck
2005-01-09	Tracey's Kitchen And Dining Room
2005-01-16	Andre's Main Floor
2005-02-13	Barbara's Living and Dining Room
2005-04-01	Tina's Full House
2005-04-15	Pat's Paradise
2005-05-20	8 Kids Basement
2005-06-03	Helen's House
2005-06-17	Nick's Office Refuge

=== Season 4 ===
Date	Title
2005-09-09	Cassandra's Basement
2005-09-23	Michael's New Digs
2005-09-30	Melanie's Loft
2005-10-07	Trevor's Wish
2005-10-14	Judy's Kitchen
2005-10-21	Shauna's Basement
2005-12-02	Margaret's Kitchen And Deck
2005-12-30	Valerie's Farmhouse
