= Disaster DIY =

Canadian television series

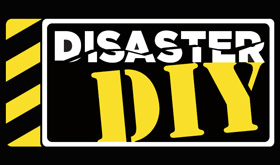
- Starring: Bryan Baeumler
- Country of origin: Canada
- Original language: English
- No. of seasons: 5
- No. of episodes: 91

Production
- Running time: 30-minute time slot

Original release
- Network: HGTV Canada
- Release: 4 January 2007 – 19 May 2011

Related
- House of Bryan; Leave It to Bryan; Bryan Inc.; Island of Bryan

Disaster DIY is a show on HGTV Canada about "Do-It-Yourselfer"s who have failed at their own home renovations and are in desperate need of some on-the-job training. The host is Bryan Baeumler and it is directed by Craig Goodwill. The projects are located in the Greater Toronto Area. The show is produced by Si Entertainment.

== Cottage Edition ==
"Disaster DIY – Cottage Edition" is a special version of the show, in which the projects are located just outside the Greater Toronto Area, in cottage areas.

== Episodes ==
=== Season 1 ===
Title	Disaster	Air Date
Agonizing Addition	Home Addition	January 4, 2007
Marital Blitz	Kitchen	January 11, 2007
Death-Trap Deck	Back Deck	January 18, 2007
Bathroom Bungle	Bathroom	January 25, 2007
Small Kitchen, Big Mess	Kitchen	February 1, 2007
Electrical Nightmare	Basement Playroom	February 8, 2007
Living Room Lapse	Living Room	February 15, 2007
Hopeless Home Gym	Home Gym Room	February 22, 2007
Knock-Down Nightmare	Home Work Studio	March 1, 2007
Hell's Kitchen	Kitchen	March 8, 2007
Main Floor Mayhem	Living Room	March 15, 2007
Failing Bathroom	Bathroom	March 22, 2007
Double Decker Disaster	Front Porch, Balcony	June 17, 2007

=== Season 2 ===
Title	Disaster	Air Date
Kitchen Attack	Kitchen	October 4, 2007
Wrecked Room	Basement Rec-room	October 11, 2007
Emergency Entrance	Walk-up Basement Entrance	October 18, 2007
Bathroom Blowout	Bathroom	October 25, 2007
Pet Project	Patio, Garbage Shed, Dog House, Cat House	November 1, 2007
Kitchen Collapse	Kitchen	November 8, 2007
Plastic-Wrap Deck	Deck	November 15, 2007
Bathroom Blunder	Bathroom	November 22, 2007
Trailer Disaster	Deck	November 29, 2007
Buyers Regret	Dining Room, Living Room	December 6, 2007
Bummed Out Basement	Basement	December 13, 2007
Kitchen Blues	Kitchen	January 10, 2008
Office Fallout	Office Room	January 24, 2008
Cracked Up Kitchen	Kitchen	January 31, 2008
Bathroom Bust	Bathroom	February 14, 2008
Space Wars	Laundry Room	February 21, 2008
Basement Rescue	Basement	March 6, 2008
Living Dangerously	Living Room	March 20, 2008
Kitchen Catastrophe	Kitchen	March 27, 2008
Double Disaster	Laundry Room, Basement Window	April 3, 2008
Inaccessible Bath	Bathroom	April 10, 2008
Easy Bein' Green	Basement	April 20, 2008
Shed in Shambles	Shed	May 15, 2008
Vile Verandah	Verandah	May 29, 2008
Kitchen Confusion	Kitchen	June 12, 2008
Bedroom Breakdown	Bedroom	July 6, 2008

=== Season 3 ===
Title	Disaster	Air Date
Kitchen Calamity	Kitchen	October 2, 2008
Tiling Crackdown	Kitchen, Bathroom	October 9, 2008
Bathroom Boundaries	Basement Bathroom	October 16, 2008
Hair Raising Reno	Floor, Walls	October 23, 2008
Blundering Basement	Basement	October 30, 2008
Bosnjack	Basement Hair Salon	November 6, 2008
Kitchen in Chaos	Kitchen	November 13, 2008
Disaster Dude	Basement Rec-room	November 20, 2008
Mudding Muddle	Bathroom	November 27, 2008
The Elephant	Basement Bathroom	December 4, 2008
Humane Society	Humane Society Facility	December 11, 2008
Gravel	Basement	December 18, 2008
Bumbling Benny	Backyard Storage Shed	December 25, 2008
Finally Finishing	Floor, Walls	January 8, 2009
Small Vision Kitchen	Kitchen	March 11, 2009
Bathroom Reborn	Bathroom	March 12, 2009
Diamond in the Rough	Basement Laundry Room	March 13, 2009
Family Dreams Come True - Part 1	House Structuring	March 22, 2009
Family Dreams Come True - Part 2	House Structuring	March 29, 2009
Backyard Blues	Backyard	March 29, 2009
Board & Batten Critters (Cottage Edition)	Siding	April 2, 2009
Petite Puppy Palace (Cottage Edition)	Home Addition	April 9, 2009
Basecamp Waves Good-Bye (Cottage Edition)	Front Porch	April 16, 2009
Sinking Hot Tub (Cottage Edition)	Deck	April 23, 2009
Italy Boots the Paint (Cottage Edition)	Deck	April 30, 2009
Sink or Swim (Cottage Edition)	Dock	May 7, 2009

=== Season 4 ===
Most episodes feature shopping at Lowe's (the show's main sponsor).

Title	Disaster	Air Date
Kitchen Crash	Kitchen	October 7, 2010
Basement Bedlam	Basement	October 14, 2010
Lackluster Laundry	Laundry Room	October 21, 2010
Basement Battle	Basement	October 28, 2010
Clueless Kitchen	Kitchen	November 4, 2010
Beginner Bathroom Baby	Bathroom	November 11, 2010
The Inaction Star (aka "Rocky Horror Reno")	Home Theater Room	November 18, 2010
Engagement Under Construction	Entire Main Floor	November 25, 2010
Barely Backyard	Backyard	December 2, 2010
The Imperfectionist	Laundry Room	December 9, 2010
Donald's Dilemma	Kitchen	December 16, 2010
Kitchen Impossible	Kitchen	December 23, 2010
Boss of Bryan	Backyard	December 31, 2010

=== Season 5 ===
Title	Disaster	Air Date
Arrested Reno	Bathroom	April 7, 2011
Battered Basement	Basement	April 7, 2011
Hairy Scary Reno	Kitchen	April 14, 2011
Off the Beaten Bath	Bathroom	April 14, 2011
Bathroom Cop Out	Bathroom	April 21, 2011
Little Sister Big Reno	Third Floor Walls and Ceiling	April 21, 2011
Busted Brother (Cottage Edition)	Kitchen	April 28, 2011
Junky Bunkie (Cottage Edition)	Bunkhouse	April 28, 2011
The Ugly Deck-ling (Cottage Edition)	Deck	May 5, 2011
Bunkhouse Breakdown (Cottage Edition)	Bunkhouse	May 5, 2011
Drop of Death (Cottage Edition)	Second-Storey Deck	May 12, 2011
Slacker Siding (Cottage Edition)	Siding	May 12, 2011
Appalling Apprentice (Cottage Edition)	Deck	May 19, 2011
