= Bryan Inc. =

Canadian television series

- Also known as: Renovation, Inc.
- Created by: Bryan Baeumler
- Country of origin: Canada
- Original language: English
- No. of seasons: 2
- No. of episodes: 26

Production
- Running time: 60-minute timeslot
- Production company: Si Entertainment

Original release
- Network: HGTV Canada
- Release: 25 September 2016 – 8 April 2018

Related
- Disaster DIY; Leave It to Bryan

Bryan Inc. (broadcast under the title Renovation, Inc. in the U.S.) is a HGTV Canada home building, home renovation, business reality television, and homelife reality TV show. It focuses on the Baeumler family, and the construction business established by Bryan Baeumler, with his wife Sarah joining the business as a designer, to start on building new homes and buying older homes to flip and rebuild into premium properties to sell. Bryan Inc. is a follow-up to the HGTV Canada show House of Bryan, which followed the Baeumlers as they built various houses that they themselves would live in.

The 2016 series premiere had the then highest rated season premiere on HGTV Canada of the last 5 years. The 2018 second season became the highest rated show on HGTV Canada.

After the success of Renovation Island (Island of Bryan) on HGTV USA, Bryan Inc. was licensed and reformed as Renovation, Inc., starting broadcast on the U.S. HGTV on 30 August 2020. Season 1 was reformatted from 13 episodes to 7 episodes.

== Premise ==
For season 1, the show focuses on Bryan's construction company, with wife Sarah joining the company; and Bryan and Sarah's home life with their 4 children. At the company, they will buy, renovate, and then sell houses, to turn a profit.

== History ==
Bryan Inc. was greenlit in 2015, for the fall 2016 season on HGTV Canada. It was successor to previous series House of Bryan; and also following on from Leave It to Bryan, combining aspects of both. Leave it to Bryan suspended production with the start of Bryan Inc. The season 1 series order was for 13 episodes in a 60-minute timeslot. Like the two predecessors, Bryan Inc. was also produced by Si Entertainment. The show features Bryan Baeumler, his construction company, wife Sarah, and their children. Sarah becomes involved in Bryan's company as a designer. The show premiered on 25 September 2016. The series premiere was the highest rated premiere on HGTV Canada for the last five years.

Before the start of the second season, the successor was announced as Island of Bryan. The Royal Bank of Canada was integrated into the second season, with custom commercials featuring the stars during the commercial breaks, and its products also featuring in the episodes. For the second season, Sarah Baeumler increases her role inside the company, becoming a project manager. Season two would also be a 13 episode season filling a 60-minute timeslot. Season 2 became the highest rated specialty entertainment program on HGTV Canada.

== Cast ==
The show cast primary consisted of Bryan Baeumler and his family.

- Bryan Baeumler — builder, business owner
- Sarah Baeumler — designer
- Quentyn "Q" Baeumler — eldest son
- Charlotte Baeumler — eldest daughter
- Lincoln "Link" Baeumler — youngest son
- Josephine "JoJo" Baeumler — youngest daughter
- Adam Weir — Bryan's apprentice

== Episodes ==
=== Overview ===
Season	Title	Episodes	Premiere	Finale
Season 1	—N/a	13	25 September 2016	12 February 2017
Season 2	—N/a	13	14 January 2018	8 April 2018

=== Season 1 ===
Season 1
No. overall	No. in season	Title	Original release date	Prod. code
1	1	"The New Hire"	25 September 2016	
2	2	"Baeum's Away"	2 October 2016	
3	3	"Level with Me"	9 October 2016	
4	4	"Going South"	16 October 2016	
5	5	"Frame Rate"	23 October 2016	
6	6	"Animal House"	30 October 2016	
7	7	"Hard Wired"	6 November 2016	
8	8	"Brexit"	13 November 2016	
9	9	"Stone Faced"	15 January 2017	
10	10	"Tile by Jury"	22 January 2017	
11	11	"Lining Up"	29 January 2017	
12	12	"Stuck in the Mud"	5 February 2017	
13	13	"High(view) and Mighty"	12 February 2017	

=== Season 2 ===
Season 2
No. overall	No. in season	Title	Original release date	Prod. code
14	1	"Throw Her to The Lions"	14 January 2018	
15	2	"Balance Beam"	21 January 2018	
16	3	"Woody Bully"	28 January 2018	
17	4	"Mind Your Beeswax"	4 February 2018	
18	5	"Bones About It"	11 February 2018	
19	6	"Flutey Patootie"	18 February 2018	
20	7	"Feel the Bern"	25 February 2018	
21	8	"Playing with Wire"	4 March 2018	
22	9	"Promises, Promises"	11 March 2018	
23	10	"Away Game"	18 March 2018	
24	11	"What's the Stitch"	25 March 2018	
25	12	"Take Cover"	1 April 2018	
26	13	"Satisfaction Guaranteed"	8 April 2018	

== Business ==
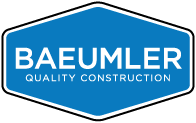
Baeumler Quality Construction

The business that the show revolves around is Baeumler Quality Construction (BQC), co-founded by Bryan Baeumler, a home construction business that does new builds and renovations; a full-service construction and renovation firm. The company operates in the Greater Toronto Area of Ontario, Canada; and is based in Burlington and Oakville.

BQC was founded in 2008 by a merger of Bryan Baeumler's contracting business with Stuart Bailey's cabinetry business, and went on to grow into one of the largest construction companies in Ontario. Along with construction, cabinetry, and media arms, BQC also has Baeumler Approved certification for local contractors to give recommendations to handle overload work that BQC cannot handle themselves due to excess demand, and BQC Family Foundation for charitable works involving children.
