= Island of Bryan =

Canadian reality television series

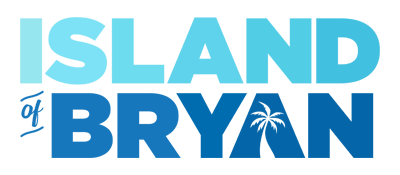
- Also known as: Renovation Island
- Created by: Bryan Baeumler
- Country of origin: Canada
- Original language: English
- No. of seasons: 5
- No. of episodes: 47

Production
- Producer: Bryland Entertainment
- Production location: Bahamas
- Running time: 60-minute timeslot
- Production company: Si Entertainment

Original release
- Network: HGTV Canada
- Release: 7 April 2019 – 20 November 2022

Related
- Disaster DIY; Leave It to Bryan; House of Bryan; Bryan Inc.

Island of Bryan is an HGTV Canada reality television series of renovation, home life, and business activities, premiering in the spring of 2019. The show is similar to House of Bryan and Bryan Inc., previous shows starring builder Bryan Baeumler, his wife Sarah, and their children, along with Bryan's apprentice Adam. The Baeumler family is renovating and restoring a tropical island beachfront resort, which they have bought by leveraging everything they have. The show was broadcast in the United States on HGTV USA as Renovation Island.

In its first season, the series ranked third of all specialty television programs in Canada and became the highest rated show on HGTV Canada in over a decade. The series was renewed for a second season, to continue the renovations and bring the resort to its opening. The series was renewed for a 13 episode third season, which was filmed during the COVID-19 pandemic. A fourth season aired during the spring of 2022, and the fifth season aired during the fall of 2022.

== Premise ==
The Baeumlers have bought an abandoned beachfront resort on South Andros island, the largest and least developed of the Bahamas islands, renaming it the Caerula Mar Club. They have moved their entire family to the resort to live while they rebuild it, and hope to open within six months or lose it, without its cashflow.

== Production ==
In 2017, the Baeumlers vacationed on South Andros in the Bahamas. They found the abandoned resort Emerald Palms, the original half-century old 18-room hotel and clubhouse; plus 22 villas, spa and beach bar added later, on a 10 acres (4.0 hectares) property; that had been renovated a few times since. The resort had closed down in 2011. When weather socked them in, they found the resort for sale on the internet. The resort is located 20 minutes from Nassau and an hour from Fort Lauderdale. They bought the resort, and starting living on a boat initially, and then moved into one of the 500-sqft. villas while renovating it. The couple left a management team back home to manage their businesses, while they work on the resort project. They originally planned to open the resort in May 2019. They started renovation work on the resort in March 2018.

HGTV greenlit the TV series in 2017, succeeding the second season of Bryan Inc., with the same production company, Si Entertainment. Filming started in 2018 for the 2019 premiere. Island of Bryan premiered on 7 April 2019, in a 60-minute timeslot on HGTV Canada, to start a season of 13 episodes. The TV show marks the first time a HGTV Canada show renovated a site that was open for the public to visit. The Royal Bank of Canada has integrated into the series, with custom commercials advertising its products with the series stars in the commercial breaks.

In May 2019, it was announced that the series would return for a second season in the Winter, and cover the six months needed to complete renovations to the remaining portion of the resort, ending the series. Season two would be eight episodes filling a 60-minute timeslot starting Winter 2020. The second season premiered on 23 February 2020 and ended on 12 April 2020.

The show was renewed for a third season by distributor Corus. The third season, consisting of ten hour-long episodes, aired from 18 April 2021 to 25 July 2021. It began amidst the COVID-19 pandemic, and continued renovations to the resort that were not part of Phase I or were not completed in time for the grand opening; it also covered the operations of the resort. The season consisted of an initial five episodes, airing from 18 April 2021 to 16 May 2021, followed by the remaining five episodes, airing from 27 June 2021 to 25 July 2021.

On 26 July 2021, Bryan Baeumler confirmed, on social media, that a fourth season was in the process of being filmed. Season 4 and season 5 were greenlit for fall 2022 and fall 2023, with eight hour-long episodes per season. The seasons will cover further Bahamas resort stuff, and renovations to their Florida taxiway house.

== Cast ==
The show's two main cast members are Bryan Baeumler and Sarah Baeumler along with their family. Other cast members include contractors and hotel staff.

=== Main cast ===
- Bryan Baeumler – builder, Canadian owner
- Sarah Baeumler – designer, Canadian owner married to Bryan Baeumler
- Quentyn "Q" Baeumler – elder son
- Charlotte "Shar" Baeumler – elder daughter
- Lincoln "Link" Baeumler – younger son
- Josephine "JoJo" Baeumler – younger daughter
- Adam Weir – construction supervisor, Canadian apprentice builder to Bryan; legacy Canadian from House of Bryan, Bryan Inc.

=== Additional cast ===
- Trish – interior designer; legacy Canadian from House of Bryan
- Nyguen – construction foreman; Bahamian local
- Hatchie – plumber; Bahamian local
- Poitier – electrician; Bahamian local
- Derek – electrician; Bahamian local
- Quincy – contractor; Bahamian local
- Jimbo – construction worker; Bahamian local
- Antonio – tiling; Bahamian local
- Wendell – HVAC technician; Bahamian local
- Wellington – wallpapering; from Nassau
- Lawrence – painter; Bahamian local
- Yellow – CM staff; Bahamian local
- Simon – mason; Bahamian local
- Mark – resort general manager
- Cate – resort general manager
- Sebastian – resort's executive chef

=== Guest cast ===
- Archie – groundskeeper; Bahamian local working on site for over a decade
- Marco – landskeeper; Bahamian local working on site for over a decade
- Ellen – operations manager, Canadian protege to Sarah
- Erica – administrative assistant
- Lea – administrative assistant
- Daniel – food service assistant manager
- Todd – facilities manager and Canadian construction crew from Bryan's company
- Kevin – only licensed exterminator on South Andros
- Scott – Canadian construction crew from Bryan's company
- Dave – Canadian construction crew from Bryan's company
- Josh – Canadian construction crew from Bryan's company
- Dean – Canadian construction
- Dave – Canadian TV decking personality
- Kate Campbell – Canadian TV decking personality
- Rob – plumber shipped in from Canada
- Paul Reinhold – Canadian electrician, regular on Bryan's other TV shows
- Werner Baeumler – Bryan's father
- Colleen Baeumler – Bryan's mother
- Jessica – Sarah's Canadian assistant, hotel staff
- Shayla – Sarah's Canadian assistant, hotel staff

== Episodes ==
=== Series overview ===
Series overview
Number of seasons	Episodes	Originally released	
Number of seasons	Episodes	First released	Last released
5	47	7 April 2019	20 November 2022

=== Season overviews ===
Series overview
Season	Episodes	Originally released	
Season	Episodes	First released	Last released
1	13	7 April 2019	30 June 2019
2	8	23 February 2020	12 April 2020
3	10	18 April 2021	25 July 2021
4	8	27 March 2022	15 May 2022
5	8	2 October 2022	20 November 2022

=== Season 1 (2019) ===
No. overall	No. in season	Title	Original release date	CAN viewers (millions)
1	1	"Welcome to Bryland"	7 April 2019	N/A
The Baeumlers explain the premise of the show, and show up at the resort, introducing the resort, picking a villa to live in, and bringing in their belongings and tools. Introduction to the Baeumlers, and the local keepers that upkept the resort. Sarah turns 40. It is revealed the last time the resort has been in operation is a decade ago.
2	2	"This Build is a Beach"	14 April 2019	N/A
Start of reconstruction of main block, introduction to local building crew. Run through of the facilities, with design, with refurbishment. Reveal plan to refurb main block, hotel block, beachfront villas. Cleaning out storage reveals stuffs expired for two decades. Bryan and Adam start renovating the ocean-side hotel-block suites. The local crew start renovating the main block. Termites are discovered everywhere, in tile and concrete, in drywall and drywall paper, in wood. Bryan is shown to be freaked by scorpions. The new resort website is built.
3	3	"The Deep End"	21 April 2019	N/A
Extermination starts, extensive termite damage revealed. Hot tub demolished, pool is rebuilt.
4	4	"Sea Change"	28 April 2019	N/A
Renovation on the club house proceeds, focusing on the dining room. Renovation focuses on the honeymoon suite villa. Problems of importing goods to the island explained.
5	5	"Remote Control"	5 May 2019	N/A
Renovations continue on the Honeymoon Suite and the clubhouse kitchen.
6	6	"Hit the Roof"	12 May 2019	N/A
Renovations proceed with the exteriors. Plans to have basic exteriors done for all villas, main buildings, hotel block, clubhouse. Phase one restricted to main buildings, hotel block, clubhouse, four beachside vills, and two more, with possibility of cutting exterior work from other villas. Discussion of naming villas, Emerald Palms, Caerula Mar, and opening date.
7	7	"Bring in the Troops"	19 May 2019	0.85
The Baeumlers have been working on the island for four months. Bryan brings in men from his Canadian construction company to speed up work through additional workers, and enjoy tropical island time while Toronto, Ontario, Canada is in winter. The opening date of the resort is pushed as work will not finish as anticipated. The eldest Baeumler child turns 14. Bryan picks up side jobs in Canada to bring in money to cover the shortfall caused by the delay in opening. Some early reservations are cancelled. The Canadian crew work on the villas where Bryan and Adam were working and all vanity rough-ins, while the Bahamians continue on the main buildings. Canadian vanity counter subcontractor company comes in with incorrectly sized quartz countertops, needing rough-in resizings. The Baeumlers are rapidly approaching their monetary limits, with the cost overruns, additional needed re/work, and delays. The family return to Canada is delayed.
8	8	"Power Struggle"	26 May 2019	0.97
Roofing, villa decks and wallpapering continue. Clubhouse windows are installed. They discover that the power bill is not delivered, but they must pick it up at the power station, and their $25,000 bill has been unpaid, and needs to be paid immediately or be shut off.
9	9	"Setting the Bar"	2 June 2019	0.92
Work on the main block, commercial kitchen, pool bar, pool deck.
10	10	"Out of Gas"	9 June 2019	0.95
Clubhouse work continues. Opening date pushed, year one opening facilities downscaled, extension of length of gradual refurbishment and opening of units. A large shipment arrives at the Driggs Hill port for the resort renovation, including all doors and PVC planters. The propane-powered forklift gases out in the middle of the road, and the island gas plant has been out of supplies for a week.
11	11	"Managers on Duty"	16 June 2019	0.94
The first unit is completed. Hospitality training and excursion offerings explored, furnishing commences. Bryan turns 45. Hotel manager's office renovated, hospitality planning examined.
12	12	"Bottoms Up"	23 June 2019	1.11
Renovations continue, Easter is celebrated, marking the start of island summer, and the lack of a springtime.
13	13	"Almost Paradise"	30 June 2019	0.91
The Baeumlers have spent a year on the island, renovating the resort. Bryan's choice of not building wood planter boxes, and buying online PVC planters and privacy screens, for the hotel block, gets delivered. Poolside bar cabana is finished. The hotel block is 50 years old as of 2019, and is the original resort building; and its refurbishment was a gut-job. Clubhouse kitchen is finished. The soft opening is scheduled for summer 2019, while the grand opening of phase one is for fall 2019. Phase one wrap-up is overviewed.

=== Season 2 (2020) ===
No. overall	No. in season	Title	Original release date	CAN viewers (millions)
14	1	"Back to Reality"	23 February 2020	0.98
Season 2 premiere. Renovations continue on the clubhouse, with the front entrance, lobby, café, bar, restaurant dining room. Planning continues with the restaurant patio, entrance zone, entrance drive. There are only weeks left to opening.
15	2	"Dog Days"	1 March 2020	N/A
Work proceeds on the spa building and entranceway. The roadside sign gets facelifted. Push is on to get the first six villas starting from the beach and the beach done in time for guests. JoJo petitions for a pet dog, she dogsits the dog Lucy, and then Adam's pair of puppies. Encountering an unexpected empty acetylene tank that they had expected to be shipped filled from Canada, they spend $1700 to get a private flight to Nassau and back to fill the tank, so they can braze the refrigeration system piping, on the only day that the installation crew is onsite. Water problems are found with insufficient supply, with resort facilities running off a 1 1/2-inch line, but the line feeding the resort cistern being only an inch. The pipe needing replacement back to the original larger supply pipe from the street. JoJo borrows puppy Kaya from Qubert, the egg supplier, delivered by Herbert, Qubert's father. There are 12 weeks to opening.
16	3	"Set in Stone"	8 March 2020	N/A
Work proceeds on villa porch decks, hotel block bathrooms tiling, clubhouse, Switcha restaurant, laundry building. JoJo discusses her six-year-old life. Property markers are unburied to determine site boundaries. Baeumler kids are to be prepped to be sent home to Canada to go back to school, to be watched by their four grandparents. The pool is converted to salt water, with a chlorination generator. Solar powered attic powered fan vents and soffit vents are installed. There are eight weeks to opening.
17	4	"Close to Home"	15 March 2020	N/A
Category 5 Hurricane Dorian strikes the Bahamas, members of the local staff have their families affected, though the site is on the other end of the Bahamas from the hurricane strike. The Baeumlers and Adam were back in Canada the week before, when Dorian arrived. The Baeumlers set up a hurricane relief fund, and welcome packages for family of affected staff who are moving in with their relations at Andros; and welcome back party for returning staff. Preparations are made to secure the resort in case a hurricane were to strike. The Baeumlers decide to continue construction, instead of waiting for the hurricane aftermath to clear, to continue to employ their locals. Deliveries are affected, as government staff is concentrated in the hurricane zone, slowing clearances of others. The mahogany doors on the villas are replaced with new doors. The four signature villas (Emerald Palms, Someday Suite, Honeymoon Suite, Signature) must be completed to accommodate a wedding reservation. Cabinetry install at the Switcha Cafe next to reception starts. The local cement truck is a dump truck dry mix mixer, where dry concrete mix is added to the truck and the mixer mixes it, with wet mix coming out, and then the wet mix is transferred by hopper. The fetid onsite pond is renovated, adding aeration, fixing the fountain, repairing circulation. It is decided to put the Baeumler kids in school in Florida. The resort gains cats, male cat Moxey and newer female cat Katrina, named after the local mail boats, Captain Moxey and Lady Katrina; and another mother cat with kittens hiding in the "kitten villa".
18	5	"Shedding Light"	22 March 2020	N/A
The Baeumler kids are moved to Florida for school, staying at a rented house, with the grandparents alternating time there with Sarah, the first set of grandparents being Sarah's parents. Custom cabinetry is installed. Light fixtures are installed. The local airport is Congo Town International Airport, needed for Sarah to fly back and forth to Florida. Master electrician Paul Reinhold is imported from Canada to deal with electricals. Bryan plans to buy a 32-foot twin-engine catamaran for diving and fishing charters at the resort, which is shipped to Driggs Hill Dock. Planning for staff training. The first Signature Suite is fully completed. There are four weeks to opening.
19	6	"Wedding Bells"	29 March 2020	N/A
With two weeks left, everyone rushes to complete what is needed for the soft opening, with the wedding reservation. Chef Sebastian's family moves in, one year late. Quintyn is now 14, and Bryan is examining him in a more adult fashion. The other Baeumler children are in Florida with their grandparents, attending school. Moulding is left out; the fitness centre is incomplete; there is no time to train staff for the Switcha café; finishing elements in the spa are covered up with decorations as they have not arrived; landscaping is rushed; locally sourced replacements are used for several items that could not be shipped in on time. The wedding goes off well. Several boatloads and planeloads are left for completion, with a few weeks left to the hard opening.
20	7	"Bottom Line"	5 April 2020	0.98
There is a week-and-a-half until opening, with the wedding reception soft open already past and successful. Tasks are prioritized to have a presentable resort when open, and leave other tasks for later. One of the cargo boats from Bimini has broken down, leaving several supplies unavailable in time. Several cargo planes are chartered. The new staff building and laundry with watersports storage, has its shell completed but yet to be fitted out. Laundry machines are ordered for the new facility. The gym in the old laundry building is assembled, but missing some wall fixtures. The first stage of the spa is completed. All the exterior doors finally arrive with a cargo boat. The Baeumlers review their finances. Bryan explores what possible duties he would have after opening. A scuba tour group visits the hotel to see it before it opens, and leaves for the blue holes.
21	8	"Open For Business"	12 April 2020	1.06
Whatever can be done in time for opening is being done. Finishing touches are applied to the essential common areas. Staff training proceeds apace. Cleanup proceeds to clear debris from the client accessible areas. The Baeumler kids visit. With the opening of the resort, Adam goes home to Canada, in time for autumn. A walkthrough of the completed parts of the resort, 36 hours before opening, is shown. The Baeumler couple leave for a vacation before coming back for more work. They will regularly commute back and forth. Phase one is completed, with two years of work.

=== Season 3 (2021) ===
No. overall	No. in season	Title	Original release date	CAN viewers (millions)
22	1	"Marooned"	18 April 2021	1.17
The resort is shut down 6 weeks after opening week (complete with a Junkanoo band), due to the COVID-19 pandemic. Quentyn returns home to Canada to continue equestrian training. The island goes under lockdown, meaning no boats or flights in and out, leaving evacuation due to emergency in doubt. Most employees are laid off, only a few remaining. Staff uniforms feature monogrammed CM with a C circling the M. The Baeumlers stay at the resort, unable to reach their newly bought Florida house; along with their chef's family, who live onsite. Willow Baeumler, their island dog, is introduced. The rest of the children are schooled online. The Baeumlers are using frugal renovation techniques to continue renovations, due to lack of shipping and needing to keep costs down. The resort, even when empty, requires upkeep and air conditioning. They plan to reopen after hurricane season. The Baeumlers and chef Sebastian's family live off the 6 months of supplies stocked up for guests that will not arrive. Perishables are donated out to the island instead of letting it rot fridges. The lounge / gamesroom is completed. The Bahamas lift travel restrictions after 6 months. The Baeumlers board up the resort for hurricane season, and return to Canada to assess their financial situation, and how to survive the pandemic financial crisis. Canada has a strict pandemic travel quarantine, so returning to Canada involves 2 weeks shut-in locked-down. There is a month to reopening, planned for the end of October 2020. It has been months since the family and Q have been together, a year since the other children have returned to Canada. Q plans to stay in Canada to continue training instead of returning to the resort. The Baeumler couple start planning for Shar's highschool next year, and whether to sell their home in Canada, which they are not occupying due to needs in the Bahamas. Bryan's father's medical condition and health is discussed. A new management team is hired for the resort.
23	2	"A for Effort"	25 April 2021	N/A
The Baeumlers celebrate their 16th marriage anniversary in Toronto, Ontario, Canada. October 24 is set to be re-opening date for the resort; it's been 7 months without business already. They grab Jason the Mason from Canada to go consult in the Bahamas. The kids miss their Canadian friends, animals, toys. Adam, no longer the project manager or a series regular, visits their Canadian home. Sarah misses her car, as in the Bahamas, she rides a side-by-side. She goes shopping for finishes. It's been about 18 years since Baeumler started his construction business, and Bryan revisits the office; goes to meet with Matthew (construction company project manager) and Kayla, to review the business. The construction business is going strong. Sarah meets with Anthony Vallin for ordering plasterwork decorations from Canada. The Baeumlers return to the Bahamas from Canada; but are considering needing to sell their "Forever Home". Q will stay in Canada. The Baeumlers need to fix up the resort after not tending for a couple of months. Mark and Kate, the old managers, returned home to the British Virgin Islands for the pandemic. The new resort general managers are Ron and Margaret, they formerly worked at Emerald Palms some 13 years before as managers. "Miss" Sarah is hired as an on-site teacher for the kids; and a temporary school villa is set up. The kids are registered for distance learning. The pre-pandemic ordered and stored premix cement has solidified in the humidity during the pandemic, leaving Jason the Mason a shortage to build the pizza oven. Jason works with Bahamian masons Dale and Jimbo. Pandemic regulations and rules are reviewed. COVID strikes a supplier, leaving them short of a countertop for the outdoor kitchen area; to be replaced by a concrete one poured onsite, to be sourced locally. Jason's flight is interfered with by COVID, leaving him on the island another 2 weeks. Ryan starts wallpapering, while Yellow continues to paint.
24	3	"Don't Count Your Chickens"	2 May 2021	N/A
They start hatching chicks and ducklings for the bird pen.
25	4	"The Final Suntier"	9 May 2021	N/A
Guests start to arrive, the central block is fully filled with 22 guests. COVID protocols are reviewed. The Baeumler kids are restricted to the back, outside of guest areas, including pool, off the beach, out of the kitchens. Solar PV panels get to be installed on the hotel block, engendering noise complaints. Peter will pause the installation, to a later date during low season, completing only the long north side and short east side along the beach. The five installers will be flown back outside of high season. A coconut falls from a tree and dents the pizza oven, necessitating coconut removal from the coconut palm tree.
26	5	"Back of the House"	16 May 2021	N/A
The adventure team of Jen and Davide, certified dive masters, start offering excursions. Kayaks, paddleboards, scuba gear are set up. Sarah surveys the guests for their opinions. The staff and laundry building is completed. They start using PVC panels for interior walls, instead of conventional drywalling techniques. Electronic locks start failing in the hotel block, necessitating looking into replacing them with a new model, and getting a locksmith to cut physical keys and re-key the locks to have individual keys in addition to the master key. The excursion boat is repaired. Willow Baeumler the dog escapes the Baeumler villa and chases the chickens. Villa #9 is being completed; villa #5 is fully finished. The first excursion is a trip to a remote beach on the backside of the island. It is threatened by a sudden rain. The washers and dryers and laundry is moved from the temporary laundry villa to the permanent laundry room, in the middle of the night. Construction cleanup for the new laundry/staff building also proceeds. Q returns from Canada, for the first time in months, and learns of the new restrictions on access.
27	6	"We Got Bills"	27 June 2021	0.85
Caerula Mar is the only local COVID-19 government-approved testing centre. COVID-19 has reduced guests to a low of 6, while cleaning regime requires increased custodial staff and security staff. Kitchen staff is needed for guests 24/7. The Baeumlers are burning cash due to increased demands of COVID-19 making them unable to reduce or furlough staff, even while reduction in guests reduces revenue. They Baeumlers cannot afford to shutdown the resort with its carrying costs, for renovation or to wait out COVID-19. A yoga deck is planned next to the spa, and how to construct it so that the guests do not see or hear it being built. They create a gated new staff, delivery, and equipment access driveway away from the main guest driveway. The Baeumler children and their tutor Miss Sarah examine whale bones. The whale skeleton is assembled and hung from the schoolhouse bungalow ceiling, after having it for a few years in storage. The boutique is built out of Sarah's old office. Sebastien has returned to Canada on leave, while Carlos handles the kitchen. Power problems happen in the kitchen, with surges, blackouts, brownouts, from the incoming supply; which fried the electronics of an oven. The PR company suggests that media be invited to increase bookings.
28	7	"No Place Like Home"	4 July 2021	0.77
Renovation on Villa 9 ensues, with Dave and the Canadian construction crew. Villa 9 has already been booked, but they then postpone indefinitely due to COVID-19, resulting in postponement of the renovation. A dive centre is built out of a 40 ft (12 m) sea container, the shipping container was used to ship in the solar panels. Lawrence and Bryan builds sea anchors out of retired planters. Art installations are placed in the restaurant, custom jobs ordered from artists in Canada. Caerula Mar teams up with the Great Sea Project on a small scale recycling project, as there is no recycling program previously on Andros. The project would sort, chip, and pack recyclables, and ship them off to a recycling centre on another island. The Baeumlers plan for after the renovation, on how much time to stay at the resort. The sea anchors are emplaced to create a mooring point on coral reefs, so that boat anchors don't damage it. They start planning for their lives in Florida. The property they own in Florida, originally to be temporary home while they build their own house, and then become a rental, is to be renovated to allow for each child their own room. Lawrence is put in charge of the ducks, while Bryan is away in Florida.
29	8	"Shake it Up"	11 July 2021	0.94
The Baeumlers postpone their visit to Florida over COVID-19 concerns, where cases are exploding. They return to winter in King City, Ontario, Canada, and lockdown, instead. Due to COVID-19, living in Florida is pushed off until much later. The boat has sunk in the harbour, breaking most of the equipment. After fishing the boat out of the sea, the boat is inspected, needing over $100,000 worth of repairs. The boat is needed for resort fishing, scuba, and excursions, so it is a key part of operations. Adam Weir returns to Caerula Mar, Bryan reveals that most of the power is now solar generated, and how to harvest coconuts. With COVID-19, the Baeumlers decide to stay on Andros instead of being in Canada or Florida. They decide to move the kids into the School Villa next door, and clear space in their villa for a small office, workspace, kitchenette, and private couples space, with minor renovations. The kids room in the school villa is completed. While in Ontario, Charlotte gets a new dog, Bixby. Nassau mixologist develops new cocktails for the resort. The Baeumlers greet their guests. The septic tank is emptied.
30	9	"Game Set Match"	18 July 2021	0.72
Originally, the Baeumler family was supposed to occupy two villas during the renovations, now it is being realized. The Baeumler couple's villa reno is completed with Ryan and the Canadian crew. A laundry alcove is created instead of having just a nook. The pink marble floor is covered with flooring. A concrete 24 ft × 48 ft (7.3 m × 14.6 m) pickleball court is added to the resort. A beach volleyball court is added to the beach. The boutique adds local products, coconut soap made from coconut milk of the resort's coconut trees' coconuts. Some of the sales go towards local charities, including the Bahamas National Trust. Some paths are built between the pizza oven area, yoga area, spa, beach, restrooms. Plantings are arranged to hide the staff villas from the guest areas, a berm with a hedge on it, by Marcos and Sarah. Some local islander potcake dog pups, relatives of Willow, are distributed, one going to Canadian crew Tim.
31	10	"The Sleeping Giant"	25 July 2021	N/A
The Baeumler's house in Florida, nicknamed "The Divorce House" by the neighbourhood, is explored, which was bought 18 months earlier, before COVID-19. The house includes an aircraft hangar, which is rented out. The house is located on a taxiway to a private runway. The Rusty Barge, was a barge that dug out the Drigg's Hill harbour, Pirate's Bay, then tied up as a dock, then rusted out and sunk. At the Rusty Barge, the Baeumlers build a dock area, with EZ-Dock, to provide marina facilities and amenities for guests at the harbour pier area. It is not located within the resort area, but is in the local harbour. The resort reno plan is explored, where before they had planned to continue reno on further villas, COVID-19 caused them to revise and build guest experiences instead. A solar water heater is added to the laundry building roof to use to heat the pool. The Baeumlers plant a coral nursery. A children's beach hideaway is added. Bryan plans to get a pilot's licence and buy a small plane, to go with their Florida house with a hangar. Bryan grew up at an airport, so it is a dream of his to do so. Three years have passed since Sarah's 40th and their initial move to Andros to renovate the resort.

=== Season 4 (Spring 2022) ===
This season functions as House of Bryan: Florida Vacation Home; a season 5 for that older show.

Renovation Island season 4 aired in the Summer 2022 U.S. TV season on HGTV USA, later than the Spring 2022 Canadian TV season for Island of Bryan season 4 on HGTV Canada.

No. overall	No. in season	Title	Original release date	CAN viewers (millions)
32	1	"House of Bryan"	27 March 2022	N/A
The Baeumlers have moved in to the Florida house, 1 hour flight from the hotel in the Bahamas, after 7 months off due to the COVID-19 restrictions. The neighbours refer to it as the abandoned house due to not being occupied for a while. Its located on an airfield, with an airplane hangar/garage built-in. JoJo is taking riding lessons. Bryan is on his way to get his pilot's licence; his father is a pilot. The Baeumlers chose the town due to Q riding in competition at a show in town. The house is a split-floor ranch house built four decades ago. The Baeumlers have sold their Canadian house, described as their "forever home". The family pack up their old house. They plan to get another home in Canada after finishing their Florida house, and completely setting up the hotel. The Florida house is 1/3 the size of the Canada house, but many times the size of the hotel villa they were stuck in for three years. The Baeumlers plan a reno, to redo the back yard, integrate a workshop into the hangar, reno the kitchen, do Jack-and-Jill rooms for the sons and for the daughters, reno the guest room into a guest room / home office, add a second floor master suite. Landscapers have come in to clear the yard, and roofers to clear the roof, in preparation for the second floor addition and fixing leaks; work crews demo the interior. They hire local contractor Chris to help. They plan to reno half the house at a time and live in the other half. The pool lanai and insect screens are removed. The hotel is fully open, after the pandemic closures. A traffic accident has smashed the resort sign. The floating dock is moved as it was cramped in space shared with local fishers.
33	2	"Half Baked"	3 April 2022	N/A
Entertainment Tonight visits the resort. The Baeumlers enjoy life away from the Florida reno, resting in the hotel resort, just before the end of the resort season. Josephine continues riding lessons. Charlotte gets tennis lessons, switching over from dance that she focused on in Canada. Lincoln starts wakeboarding. Sarah trains Quentin on a golf cart for driving. Demolition continues in the Florida house, including a bathroom and a kitchen. House is divided up with barriers to separate reno zone with living zone. The lanai demo is more involved than expected, necessitating an excavator, instead of manually disassembling it. Bryan starts reno planning on the hangar, calling it the Birdhouse, akin to the Doghouse he just sold in the old barn at the property in Canada. Bryan and designer Julio plan for a 300-in screen and drive-in home theatre. Landscaping planning starts. Sarah and landscape designer Greg start sounding out features. Greg previously worked on the resort. Bryan installs a bigger side door on the hangar to allow access via forklift, and to store materials, and a large RV to live in as they continue reno on the house. Sarah looks for a rental unit to stay as continue the reno on the house; and ends up renting another house in the neighbourhood. It is the house they originally looked at for purchase; however someone else has reno'd it in the interim. It would also serve as an office and design space for Sarah. The reno planned may be 250 sq ft over the 50% limit for a level 2 reno, making it a level 3, necessitating bringing the entire house up to current code, and more and deeper inspections. Further calculation may indicate that it is still a level 2 reno. Material being delivered arrives at unusual times due to early availability and late shipment from COVID-19 related delays in supply chains.
34	3	"Middle Man"	10 April 2022	N/A
The hotel-resort is closed for the offseason, only maintenance personnel are on site. Adam returns for maintenance, fun, and renos. Villa 21 has been turned into a tool shack, in the back of house. The sign on the road that was run into by a car is fixed. The dock is moved to its new location. Bryan invites Adam to reno the Florida house. The house reno continues apace. The golf cart garage is turned into a laundry room. The plumbing is being rerun, and the septic system is being replaced.
35	4	"Flight Path"	17 April 2022	N/A
While the hotel is closed for hurricane season, work is done to the new Signature Series villa, Villa 5. The new boat arrives at Bimini, the catamaran "Unsinkable II", to replace the sunken one. It is taken out into storage on the boat trailer, for the hurricane season. The contents of their house in Canada has arrived in Florida. It is divided up into what goes to the new house and the new office and storage, when unloading the moving truck. At the Florida house, the pool reno plans are discussed, the initial swimming pool renovation budget of $50k balloons to $150k. Reno continues apace at the hangar. Bryan's airplane needs multiple stops for refuel to reach Canada. Reno continues apace for the office building space Sarah is renting for her new company, the Baeumler Design Group (stylized SB logo). Bryan flies with his instructor and Sarah. Bryan grew up in a hangar at his father's business at the airport. Bryan's father was a pilot and Bryan wants to complete his licence. Reno continues apace on the house. Adam leaves for Canada, with winter approaching. The deadline at the rental house is approaching with much unfinished at their home and Sarah's office, and the hotel reopening in three weeks. Bryan has bought an RV in Calgary, Alberta, Canada; and drives it home to Florida, over 9 days and 5,700 km (3,500 mi). Bryan ships Dave, a member of his Canadian crew, down to Florida, to work on Sarah's office. The hotel opens for its first full season.
36	5	"Wheeling & Dealing"	24 April 2022	N/A
Reno continues apace on Sarah's business' office. Matt arrives from Canada to work on the office. The Baeumlers try out the RV camping. Q gets driving lessons from Sarah. The family goes in an Everglades airboat tour. They do pumpkin carving for Halloween, and fiddle with its peduncle. Sarah's office is completed.
37	6	"Flying Colours"	1 May 2022	N/A
Bryan cleans up in anticipation of his parents visiting the new house. Werner Baeumler, Bryan's father, complains about the disassembled state of the house. The parents, who were in the aviation business, examine the Cinderella Cessna 172. Werner has a Canadian private pilot's licence, so can copilot Bryan, without needing Bryan's instructor Susan, who has yet to finish his pilot's license, to go flying. Bryan has 104 hours, finished his written test, and has yet to do the finish flight test. Werner, being a retired aircraft maintenance operator, notices the problems on Bryan's Cindy 172. Bryan's parents used to go on dates in short flights to farmer's fields for picnics in 172s in the 1970s. The daughters discuss the design of their rooms; Charlotte is now 14 and wants loud bright rainbow colours. Josephine has more equestrian training, showing off to the grandparents. The Baeumlers have been together for 17 years; it's been 14 years since they rebuilt their own first home. Bryan replaces the hangar doors, for the aircraft and the RV doors. The rental home contract runs out, and they move into a hotel and the RV for a short time, while trying to find a new rental, as the house is at least 2 months from being able to move-in. Bryan has passed his check ride and has a license. Cooper and Dean, crew from Canada on vacation in Florida, come by to work on the house. A new COVID SARS variant sweeps the Bahamas, taking out 13 staff members, while the hotel is full, making running it harder. Shutting down the resort is not an option as cashflow is critical to finishing the house. Due to COVID supply train disruptions, a lot of materiel is backordered.
38	7	"Hang Time"	8 May 2022	N/A
A new variant of COVID-19 SARS-CoV-2 hits the Bahamas, necessitating staff shuffling as they become positive. The Baeumlers are sleeping in the hangar in the RV, as the house is uninhabitable. The large RV has a washer and dryer, and kitchen, and shower and toilet. The house site needs to be secured for a tropical storm front with tornadoes. There is no space for the plane in the hangar with all the construction materials, so needs to be tied down in the field. They Baeumlers get a steel portable storage unit (sea can) to store things. Due to local bylaws, the RV cannot be parked outside, necessitating a hotel stay while the hangar floor is refinished. With that work, Shar and Q head back to Canada for a visit. Marco is shipped in from Canada to handle the epoxy floor, for the hangar, and the aviation ramp from the hangar to the greenway and taxiway and runway. The floor and ramp will take about a fortnight without being used. A pickleball court is part of the ramp revamp. The pickleball court and hangar floor is completed.
39	8	"Upwardly Mobile"	15 May 2022	N/A
The resort is full, COVID is wreaking havoc with staffing levels. The family flies in to check on the hotel. Chef Sebastien is moving on to open his own restaurant, with Carlos replacing him as head chef, and Janet becoming sous-chef. Resort staff painter Yellow has become a celebrity, with guests asking for him. The floating dock is completed, with Chad and Adam. The Baeumlers are evaluation whether to take on a partner for the resort, going on as is, renovating more of the remaining villas, expanding the hotel with more property, or selling it; or expanding the brand with more resorts. A Baeumler design candidate reno opens up in Utah; to renovate a ranch resort. Sarah, and Caerula Mar managers Ron and Margaret, scout the Utah site. Living in the RV has expanded to living in the finished hangar, and staying in the Mirada RV in the hangar. Their RBC financial advisors consider the Florida house a vacation home for the Baeumlers' financials. The Jack-and-Jill for Shar and Jojo is mostly completed, so the family's stuff is being moved into the suite. Charlotte and Josephine will stay in Charlotte's room, while Quentin and Lincoln will stay in Josephine's room, and the parents will remain in the RV. Q's dresser-sized fishtank is delivered. The roof is removed to start work on the second floor addition. An offer to buy Caerula Mar comes up.

=== Season 5 (fall 2022) ===
This season functions as House of Bryan: Florida House; a season 6 for that older show.

No. overall	No. in season	Title	Original release date	CAN viewers (millions)
40	1	"Clear Skies"	2 October 2022	N/A
Bryan and Sarah consider the offer selling the resort, and decide against it. They also decide to take on what will be a vacation home for rent, possibly a series of them, with support from business partners. Permits are approved for the second floor addition on the main house in Florida and work progresses on the second floor quickly.
41	2	"Open Lines"	9 October 2022	N/A
The resort is operating well. The family’s Florida house renovation is still a work in progress, supply chain issues are causing significant problems with the build, so is weather, and design changes are being made on the fly. Sarah’s design business is expanding. The first Florida vacation rental house is now ready to rent out.
42	3	"Keys Please"	16 October 2022	N/A
The family go to the Florida Keys for some R&R, and to meet some old friends, one of which is into construction. Bryan and Sarah get some design ideas from the Florida Keys. Bryan and Sarah fight over bathroom features. The family begins relocating items from a storage unit to the house (cost too much.) Landscaping is underway. The family locates into a rental house instead of the RV. Sarah decides to enlarge the entranceway of the house. The roof is progressing significantly. The door and window order from months ago is missing some pieces. Slight design changes are made to the exterior.
43	4	"Pool Side"	23 October 2022	N/A
There is a new maintenance person for the resort. It is a major ongoing never-ending task due to the elements. The family decides what in the house in Florida to customize for current personal use vs possible resale down the line. More landscaping decisions are being made. The pool at the Florida House is being rebuilt from scratch. Structural decisions are changed. Lincoln proposes his vision of his bedroom to Sarah. A tropical storm sidelines work on the house. Stucco is applied to the house. Tile is installed in the living room.
44	5	"Holding Down the Fort"	30 October 2022	N/A
Sarah goes down to the resort to see how things are doing and to help with maintenance. Quentyn is enlisted to help Bryan with work after a few weeks off. Bryan is going to help Scott McGillivray with a renovation project up in Canada, leaving Sarah in charge of everything for 6 weeks. The mudroom is complete. The kids are in various summer camps. Stucco is complete on the house. The roof is a work in progress.
45	6	"The Kids Are Alright"	6 November 2022	N/A
The resort has been open for a year. Bryan heads off to film Renovation Resort with Scott McGillivray in Canada. The large feature aquarium for Q is installed. Charlotte is learning to drive with her learner's permit. The Cessna is moved manually as its missing an engine, and the lawn is mowed. Linc and Q's bedrooms are finished, and the Jack-and-Jill bathroom. The spare room's in-ceiling-projector and ceiling-retracting-screen are installed. The in-ground pool is installed.
46	7	"Kitchen Party"	13 November 2022	N/A
Adam (Note: (Adam, from guest on Disaster DIY to crew on Leave It to Bryan to regular on House of Bryan to cast on Bryan Inc.)) visits and works on the house. Bryan's parents came to visit during the construction. Bryan's father is 80 and a German immigrant to Canada. Bryan's mother is from the east coast and moved to Ontario. Renovation on the Kitchen continues apace, with cabinet installation, a need to replace the conduit and wiring to the island due to it being undersized. Countertops are measured and stone is selected. Pool construction continues, pool inspection is passed. Sarah selects fake topiary artificial turf sculptures for the yard, due to concerns with maintenance and them not being home all the time. A Bahamian land-crab sculpture is to go in the front yard. Hardscaping starts, and prepping for landscaping. Temporary construction stairs are removed to be replaced by the permanent stairs, necessitating a move of second floor furniture and built-ins upstairs. The sofa is oversized for moving it inside, necessitating bringing it in from the upper floor balcony. Byran reveals they ate a lot of cup ramen noodle, and boxed pasta, and mac and cheese, while renovating the resort. The Kitchen and Master Bedroom and Bathroom are almost finished. Two or three weeks are left to go, the pool will not be completed on time.
47	8	"Move in Day"	20 November 2022	N/A
Bryan and Sarah review rebuilding Emerald Palms resort into Caerula Mar; and rebuilding their Florida house. Bryan reviews the start of his career of following his own life on TV instead of just renovating other people's places, with House of Bryan season 1, where Sarah transitions from owning a ballet school to being an interior designer. They continue to review the House of Bryan series, which ends up with the Florida house as their fourth Baeumler's-own house build. They also review how the family has grown up from House of Bryan season 1 to Island of Bryan season 5. At the start of their time at the resort, they lived off a boat, and lived on dry pasta, before becoming part of the Bahamian community and learning how to order food. After buying the Florida house the Baeumlers did not do anything with it for two years, due to resort renovations and then COVID restrictions keeping them in the Bahamas primarily, and renovating it took more than two years. The Florida home was originally to be a part time home and part time rental, after a 6-month renovation of repairs and refresh, before events rolled in, and they rebuilt the house as their primary home. For season 5, most renos at the resort have been paused, to allow it to operate and bring in money to recoup some of the costs of the ongoing reno. It has been $11 million spent on buying ($2 million buy) and renovating the resort and surviving COVID-19, and will need several years to recoup that amount. Landscapers Ken and Darlene are introduced, who landscape the Florida house. After the season ends, the backyard pool is still not complete, and backyard landscaping is only partially done, with the frontyard done. Sarah and Bryan review the completed parts of the Florida house. Though the pool is not done, the pool cabana bathroom is done as the pool mudroom.

== Broadcast ==
Following its success in Canada, the series was picked up by HGTV U.S. and premiered on 7 June 2020, under the title Renovation Island. The U.S. series Renovation Island is an edited version of the Canadian series Island of Bryan. Following the success of Renovation Island on HGTV U.S., this led to the licensing of the preceding Canadian series Bryan, Inc. as Renovation, Inc., for the U.S. channel.

=== Follow-ups ===
A spin-off of Renovation Island/Island of Bryan aired in summer 2023 for HGTV Canada, called Renovation Resort, which set up a lakefront resort bought by Scott McGillivray, where Bryan Baeumler came in to help renovate and set up the resort. This show aired on HGTV USA as Renovation Resort Showdown.

With the conclusion of season 5 in fall 2022 TV season, a new follow-on hour-long TV series aired starting in fall 2023 with 10 episodes. For the HGTV Canada fall 2023 season, "Island of Bryan"/"Renovation Island" was replaced by Bryan's All In, in which Bryan helps renovate people's troubled businesses over a week and get them back on their feet. This is similar to Bryan's older shows, Leave It to Bryan and Disaster DIY, where Bryan helped renovate people's troubled homes.

A direct sequel series follow-up to Island of Bryan started airing on 7 September 2025 on Corus' Home Network in Canada, the former HGTV Canada. The new series, Building Baeumler, would continue to focus on the Baeumlers, couple and family, business with further phases of Caerula Mar, a new resort, Pines and Palms Resort, in the Florida Keys, and further Baeumler family homes, such as the ancestral Baeumler family cabin in Cottage Country, Ontario, Canada renovations.

== Reception ==
The first season ranked third in Canada for specialty television programming, and was the highest rated show on HGTV Canada in over a decade.

== Caerula Mar Club ==
Caerula Mar Club
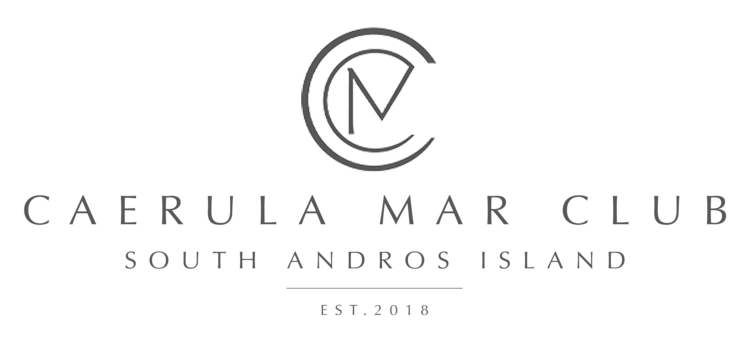
- Interactive map of the Caerula Mar Club area
- Former names: Emerald Palms

General information
- Status: Completed
- Type: Beachfront resort
- Location: South Andros, Bahamas
- Coordinates: 24.1888°N 77.5907°W
- Renovated: 2019
- Owner: Bryan & Sarah Baeumler

Renovating team
- Other designers: Sarah Baeumler
- Main contractor: Bryan Baeumler

Other information
- Number of rooms: 18 (in hotel block)
- Number of suites: 5 (in private villas)
- Facilities: Main building; 18-room hotel block; Pool; Pool bar; Spa; Clubhouse; Shed; Beach; 22 villas; Palm forest

Website
- caerulamar.com (formerly www.emerald-palms.com)

Caerula Mar Club is an island resort located in the South Andros part of Andros, Bahamas. The resort was named "Caerula Mar" (Latin for 'deep blue sea') in reference to the cerulean-coloured sea. Its stated philosophy is to have barefoot luxury for guests. As a luxury resort, initial pricing was between US$350 and US$1100 per night. The process of seeing, acquiring, Phase 1 renovations, and Phase 1 grand opening occurredover a two-year period. The resort has been designed around eco-friendliness, fair trade, and sourcing from sustainable farms and producers.

The resort is located near Drigg's Hill, where the Drigg's Hill Dock (the local harbour) is located. The local airport is Congo Town International Airport.

=== Resort history ===
The resort was originally built in the 1960s and operated under various names up until eight years before production on the show began. It contained a central hotel of 18 rooms, plus 22 villas. The oldest building, the hotel block, was completed in 1969 for the resort's original opening. At the time the resort last operated, it had room intercoms (but no outside phone lines for rooms), marble floors, and private decks with palm-lined individual gardens.

Emerald Palms in 2007

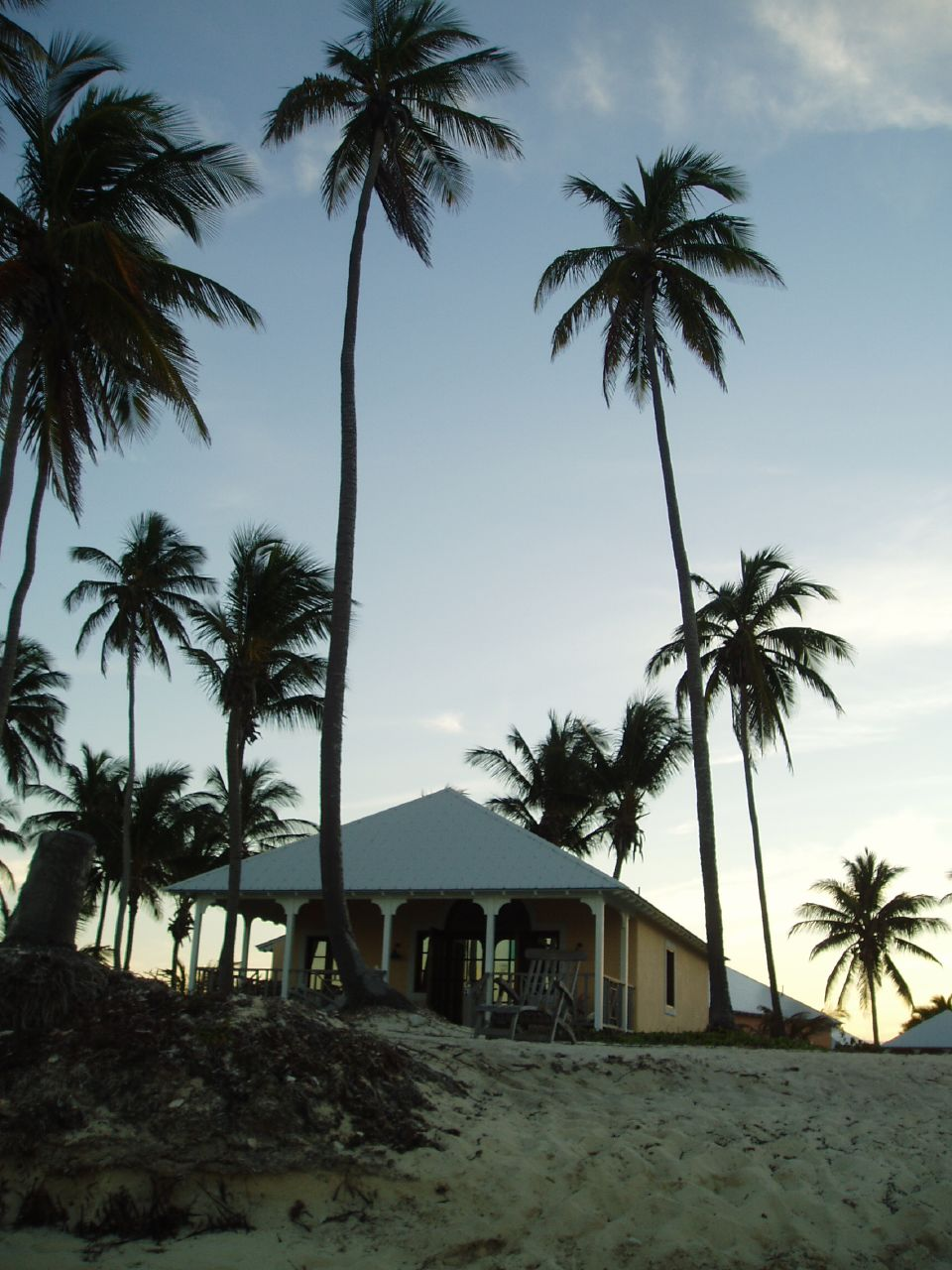
A villa at the resort

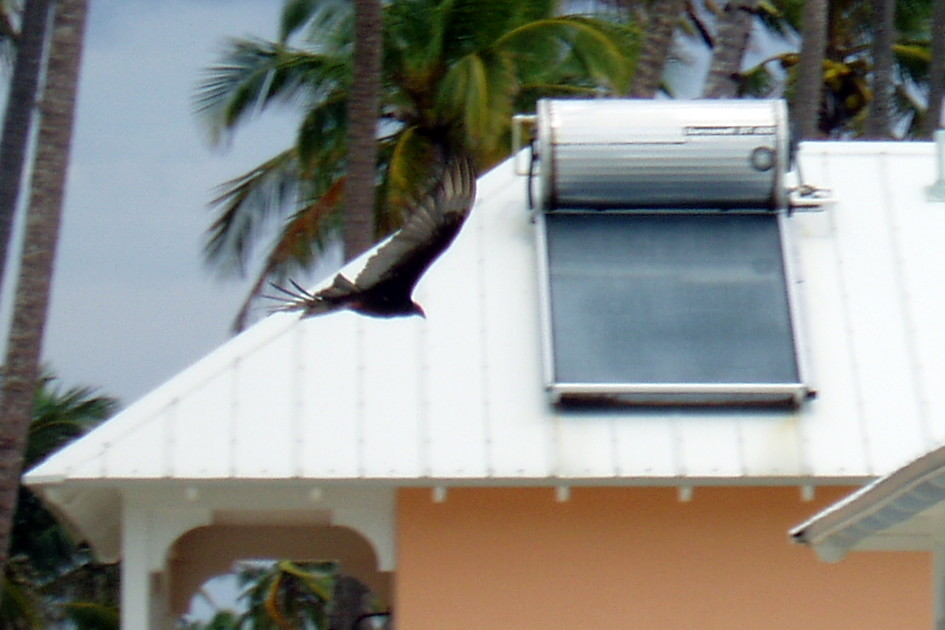
Solar hot water supply per villa

During the show Island of Bryan, the Baeumlers turn the abandoned resort into Caerula Mar Club, which was initially planned to be completed in mid-May 2019, and opened in June 2019.

The business established by the Baeumlers by the end of the first season of Island of Bryan is Caerula Mar Club resort. Its first season of business was to start in mid-May 2019, but this was delayed until June 2019. With the unanticipated delays and travails, opening was pushed back for a summer soft opening and a Phase I grand opening in fall 2019. The planned grand opening was 1 November 2019. It opened with a snackbar, bar, and restaurant, along with a spa offering massage services.

At the time of the December 2019 Phase I grand opening, there were 18 hotel suites and six villas in operation on the property, with four dining areas, both fine and casual. The opening represented the first new resort on the island in two decades.

The Robb Report named it one of the 12 best hotels in the Caribbean. It was named on the "2020 Hot List" of new hotels by Condé Nast Traveler.

In March 2020, because of the COVID-19 pandemic, the resort had to close. The resort reopened for business in October 2020. As a COVID mitigation measure, Caerula Mar started to offer a full resort reservation, to buy out the entire resort, when it reopened. Caerula Mar, along with other Bahamian resorts, started to offer on-site COVID testing to guests in 2021.
