= Bryan Baeumler =

Canadian TV host (born 1974)

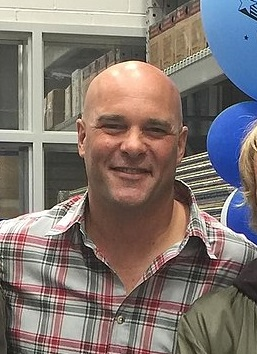
- Born: 18 April 1974 (age 52); Oakville, Ontario, Canada
- Spouse: Sarah Baeumler
- Children: 4
- Presenting career
- Station: HGTV
- Network: HGTV Canada
- Style: Television host
- Country: Canada
- Previous shows: Disaster DIY (2007–2011); House of Bryan (2010–2015); Leave It to Bryan (2012–2017); Bryan Inc. (2016–2018); Island of Bryan (2019–2022)
- Website: www.bryanbaeumler.com

Bryan Baeumler (born 18 April 1974) is a Canadian television host on several HGTV/HGTV Canada shows. A former handyman and businessman, he translated those careers into a series of TV shows about home renovations in Canada and the U.S. as well as a hotel renovation in the Bahamas. He has won a Gemini Award for his hosting and has published a book on home renovations.

== Early life and education ==
Learning the trade from his father, an aircraft engineer, Baeumler spent his childhood summers constructing his family's cottage. At 14, Baeumler opened his own handyman business doing odd jobs for neighbors. He received his B.A. in Political Science and Business from the University of Western Ontario in 1996.

== Business activity ==
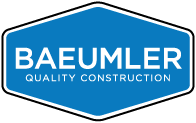
Bryan's construction company

Baeumler worked from 1995 to 2003 running an air-cargo business.

After working as a builder, he founded a construction company, which became Baeumler Quality Construction and Renovations Inc., of which he is president and CEO.

In 2011, Baeumler launched Baeumler Approved, (Note: Baeumler Approved) a website that aids homeowners in connecting with home-service companies in Canada. Baeumler became the spokesperson of HeyBryan, (Note: HeyBryan) a peer-to-peer mobile marketplace app that connects homeowners with home-service providers, in 2018.

In 2017 Bryan and his wife, Sarah Baeumler, bought an abandoned beachfront resort on South Andros, Bahamas, and renovated it into a new sustainable luxury resort, Caerula Mar Club. Just months before they opened the resort in December 2019, the Bahamas was hit by Hurricane Dorian. Although the storm did not directly hit their resort, their employees were impacted through friends and relations on the devastated islands to the north.

== Shows ==
Baeumler has been a host on several HGTV Canada (now Home Network) shows, including Disaster DIY, Disaster DIY: Cottage Edition, Leave It to Bryan, House of Bryan, Bryan Inc. (alongside his wife Sarah), and Island of Bryan, and was a judge on Canada's Handyman Challenge along with Mike Holmes and Scott McGillivray. The Baeumlers have been judges on Battle on the Beach and renovators on Rock the Block.

Baeumler was previously under an overall deal with Corus Entertainment. In September 2025, after the company assumed the rights to HGTV at the beginning of the year, Baeumler signed an overall deal with Rogers Sports & Media beginning in 2027, being initially involved in Baeumler Ranch, Sarah Baeumler By Design, and Home Town Takeover Canada.

=== Disaster DIY ===
Disaster DIY is a show on HGTV Canada about "Do-It-Yourselfer"s who have failed at their own home renovations and are in desperate need of some on-the-job training. The show is hosted by Baeumler and directed by Craig Goodwill. The projects on the show take place within the Greater Toronto Area. The show ran from 2007 to 2011.

=== House of Bryan ===
House of Bryan is a series starring Baeumler's entire nuclear family, him, his wife, and their children; plus his apprentice, Adam. The series covers the construction of various homes that the Baeumlers live in, his dream home, country cottage, and forever home. It became the highest rated series ever on HGTV Canada in 2016. The show ran from 2010 to 2015.

=== Leave It to Bryan ===
Leave it to Bryan is a Canadian home renovation reality series hosted by Baeumler, which premiered in January 2012 on HGTV. The premise of the show is that the renovations most desired by a homeowner are not necessarily always the ones most urgently needed in the home. The show ran from 2012 to 2017, and was put on hiatus.

=== Bryan Inc. / Renovation Inc. ===
Bryan Inc. premiered on HGTV Canada in fall 2016, replacing House of Bryan on the schedule. The show focuses on Baeumler pairing with his wife to buy properties, renovate or replace (new build) the houses, and then sell them at a profit. In the first season, they buy two properties, one selected by each of them, and then Baeumler's construction company crews rebuild the homes, which they then sell. The show ran from 2016 to 2018, and went on hiatus with the start of Island of Bryan. After the success of Renovation Island (Island of Bryan) on HGTV USA, Bryan Inc. was licensed as Renovation, Inc. for U.S. HGTV in 2020.

=== Island of Bryan / Renovation Island ===
Island of Bryan is a TV show that premiered on HGTV Canada on 7 April 2019. The show follows the Baeumler family as they renovate a neglected 50-year-old hotel in the Bahamas. Due to the remote location of the resort, supplies only came in weekly and did not always come every week. The family was also living in the resort while they were renovating it. The show first aired in 2019. HGTV U.S. repackaged the show in June 2020 as Renovation Island for American audiences.

=== Renovation Resort / Renovation Resort Showdown ===
Renovation Resort is a TV show that premiered on HGTV Canada in spring 2023 (and in summer 2023 in the USA, as "Renovation Resort Showdown"). The show follows Scott McGillivray, who has purchased a lakeside resort. He enlists the help of Bryan Baeumler to help renovate the resort, similar to what the Baeumlers did on Island of Bryan / Renovation Island. The show would be a 7-episode competition series, featuring 4 teams of contractor-designer duos advised by McGillivray and Baeumler, who would renovate cabin-by-cabin competing head-to-head. The winning cabin would get the winning team the grand prize.

=== Bryan's All In ===
Bryan's All In is a TV show that premiered on HGTV Canada in fall 2023. The show's premise is that Bryan would help entrepreneurs renovate their businesses to get them off their feet, with a week of reno. The show is sponsored by the Royal Bank of Canada (RBC) and has in-show sponsor material. The show fills a 60-minute timeslot for original networks HGTV Canada and StackTV. The initial season would have 10 episodes.

=== Building Baeumler ===
Building Baeumler is a TV show that premiered on Home Network in Canada in the fall of 2025. The show is a direct continuation of Island of Bryan, continuing to focus on the Baeumlers, couple and family, businesses, family homes. Further phases of Caerula Mar Club resort expansion and renovation, a new resort, Pines and Palms Resort, in the Florida Keys, the ancestral Baeumler family cottage in Cottage Country Ontario, and other projects.

== Guest appearances ==
Bryan has made several guest appearances. Bryan was a judge on Canada's Handyman Challenge. He was also a judge on Deck Wars. Bryan was a guest builder on Home to Win.

== Awards ==
Baeumler won the Gemini Award for "Best Host in a Lifestyle/Practical Information, or Performing Arts Program or Series" in 2008 for his presenting work on Disaster DIY.

== Personal life ==
Baeumler and his wife, Sarah, (March 26, 1978) were married September 3, 2004, in Toronto. They have four children: Quintyn Werner, Charlotte Anne, Lincoln Wolfgang, and Josephine Judith.

During the time that the Baeumlers were living at Caerula Mar Resort renovating it (as seen on Island of Bryan and Renovation Island), the children were at first home schooled. Then Quintyn was sent to a regional boarding school high school for a normal high school life, while the other three children were enrolled in a nearby Bahamian school. The extensive renovations at the resort put stress on Bryan's marriage with Sarah.

Sarah Baeumler is the founder and creative director of a "lifestyle brand" under her name. She offers home decoration services and an online shop.

== Published works ==
- Baeumler, Bryan. (2015) Measure Twice: Tips and Tricks from the Pros to Help You Avoid the Most Common DIY Disasters. paperback, 328 pages; HarperCollins Publishers Ltd; ISBN 9781443414326.

== See also ==
- Paul LaFrance
