= House of Bryan =

Television series

- Genre: Reality TV / Home renovation
- Starring: Bryan Baeumler; Sarah Baeumler
- Narrated by: Bryan Baeumler
- Country of origin: Canada
- Original language: English
- No. of seasons: 4

Original release
- Network: HGTV Canada

Related
- Bryan Inc.; Island of Bryan

House of Bryan is a Canadian home renovation television series which premiered in 2010 on HGTV Canada. The show follows Bryan Baeumler, host of Disaster DIY and Leave It to Bryan, as he manages a team of professionals and apprentices build a house. The show is produced by Si Entertainment. House of Bryan 1 set an audience record for HGTV Canada, in April 2010.

== Seasons ==
In the first series, House of Bryan (later referred to as In the City; a.k.a. House of Bryan 1), they renovate a small bungalow into a much larger dream home while under the careful watch of Baeumler's family.

A second series, House of Bryan: On the Rocks (provisionally House of Bryan 2), was produced. The show, which debuted in April 2012, focused on building the Baeumler family's cottage on Georgian Bay.

The third series, House of Bryan: In the Sticks (a.k.a. House of Bryan 3), was made. The show, which debuted in 2014, focused on building the Baeumler forever home, in the countryside, like where Bryan grew up, to give their children the advantages of country-living. They wanted to build a place to grow old in, and for their descendants to return to. The show focuses on building an extension to a house they've bought.

The fourth series, House of Bryan: The Final Straw (a.k.a. House of Bryan 4) debuted in October 2015. The show focuses on finishing renovations to the old section of the house they've built an extension to and landscaping.

== Cast ==
- Bryan Baeumler as General contractor, homeowner, and series lead
- Sarah Baeumler as Bryan's wife
- Adam Weir as Bryan's apprentice

== Episodes ==
=== Season 1: House of Bryan (2010) ===
Also called In The City

No. overall	No. in season	Title	Original release date
1	1	"Design, Destroy, Re-Build"	January 7, 2010
2	2	"Up in Frames"	January 14, 2010
3	3	"Down in the Trenches"	January 21, 2010
4	4	"Sink or Swim"	January 28, 2010
5	5	"Gyprock and Roll"	February 4, 2010
6	6	"Pain in the Deck"	January 11, 2010
7	7	"Dollars and Fence"	February 18, 2010
8	8	"Kitchen Showdown"	February 25, 2010
9	9	"Boys and Toys"	March 4, 2010
10	10	"Paint in the Butt"	March 11, 2010
11	11	"In Laws and Out"	March 18, 2010
12	12	"Garage Surprises"	March 25, 2010
13	13	"House of Bryan"	April 1, 2010

=== Season 2: On The Rocks (2012) ===
No. overall	No. in season	Title	Original release date
14	1	"Dock & Load"	April 5, 2012
15	2	"The Hole Truth"	April 12, 2012
16	3	"Beam Me Up"	April 19, 2012
17	4	"Bye Bye Bry"	April 26, 2012
18	5	"Designer Dilemma"	May 3, 2012
19	6	"Hit The Deck"	May 10, 2012
20	7	"Truth or Bear"	May 17, 2012
21	8	"Floor Wars"	May 24, 2012
22	9	"Off Side"	May 31, 2012
23	10	"Counterstrike"	June 7, 2012
24	11	"All Falls Down"	June 14, 2012
25	12	"Rain on Bry's Parade"	June 21, 2012
26	13	"Hard Rock Life"	June 28, 2012

=== Season 3: In The Sticks (2014) ===
No. overall	No. in season	Title	Original release date
27	1	"Stick in the Mud"	December 14, 2014
Bryan convinces Sarah to uproot the family and move to the country.
28	2	"A Hole in None"	December 14, 2014
When Bryan excavates his first bit of earth, he hits a major snag and the project comes to a halt.
29	3	"The Chicken Coup"	December 21, 2014
Bryan keeps some key details hidden from Sarah as he comes to realize that his plans for an addition onto the back of the existing home won't be so easy to execute.
30	4	"Flood, Sweat & Tears"	December 21, 2014
Mother Nature wreaks havoc on the home when Bryan is out of town for work.
31	5	"Reno Gone Wild"	January 4, 2015
Sarah recruits a designer.
32	6	"Pump the Break"	January 4, 2015
Sarah changes her mind on a design finish, which sets Bryan back.
33	7	"The Cold War"	January 11, 2015
Sarah and Bryan butt heads on some features.
34	8	"Truth or Stair"	January 11, 2015
35	9	"Absence Makes the Reno Grow Longer"	January 18, 2015
36	10	"Mo' Money, Door Problems"	January 18, 2015
37	11	"A Hardwood Day's Night"	January 25, 2015
38	12	"Tile And Error"	January 25, 2015
39	13	"The Built Trip"	February 1, 2015
40	14	"Floor Or Mess"	February 1, 2015
41	15	"Painted Love"	February 8, 2015
42	16	"Fowl Play"	February 8, 2015

=== Season 4: The Final Straw (2015) ===
No. overall	No. in season	Title	Original release date
43	1	"It's All your Vault"	TBA
44	2	"The Frame Game"	TBA
45	3	"Rough-In It"	TBA
46	4	"Old Macbaeumler Had A Barn"	TBA
47	5	"Liar Liar Plants On Fire"	TBA
48	6	"Fan Overboard"	TBA
49	7	"No Chain No Gain"	TBA
50	8	"Over And Grout"	TBA

== Spin-offs ==
For the Fall 2016 season, House of Bryan was replaced on the HGTV Canada schedule by Bryan Inc., where Bryan and wife Sarah Baeumler buy properties, renovate or replace (new build) the houses on them, and sell them for a profit, at Bryan's construction company, Baeumler Construction ("BQC").

For the Spring 2019 season, a similarly themed show to House of Bryan and Bryan Inc. premiered, Island of Bryan, where the Baeumler couple work to rebuild and restore a tropical island beachfront resort, Caerula Mar ("CM").

The 2022 season 4 of Island of Bryan involves the Baeumlers renovating their new house in Florida, in the same manner as House of Bryan documented earlier, with the exception of additional coverage of the Bahamas hotel resort, and an office renovation for Sarah's new Florida company, Baeumler Design Group ("SB").
