= Leave It to Bryan =

Canadian home renovation reality TV series

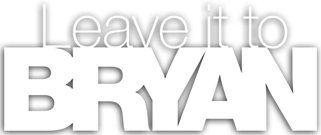
- Starring: Bryan Baeumler
- Composer: Peter Chapman
- Country of origin: Canada
- Original language: English
- No. of seasons: 7
- No. of episodes: 117

Production
- Running time: 30 min.

Original release
- Network: HGTV Canada
- Release: January 5, 2012 – April 17, 2017

Related
- House of Bryan; Bryan Inc.; Island of Bryan

Leave It to Bryan is a Canadian home renovation reality series starring contractor Bryan Baeumler, which premiered in January 2012 on HGTV.

The show is based around the concept that the renovations most desired by a homeowner are not necessarily always the ones most urgently needed in the home. Baeumler has described the series as inspired by various past clients who wanted big-ticket renovations, such as kitchen or bathroom upgrades or home theatre spaces, while neglecting or even being entirely unaware of structural deficiencies that were much more critical to the value of their home, or even to their basic physical health and safety. He has suggested in interviews that this issue has become so common that many North American cities will face a major housing crisis within 15 to 20 years, as an increasing number of homes risk becoming entirely uninhabitable, if homeowners continue to emphasize lifestyle luxuries over basic structural improvements.

Episodes typically revolve around homeowners who may not realize that they have neglected a critical structural issue, couples who disagree on which renovation should be the immediate priority within their renovation budget, or other situations where the homeowners' wants and needs may be in conflict. In each episode, Baeumler meets with the homeowner to identify the desired renovation, while also assessing the home to identify whether another renovation is more critical; he subsequently returns to the home and begins the renovation he has identified as the most immediate requirement, and the homeowners only learn which project he has actually chosen after the renovation is already underway. The show is produced by Si Entertainment in Toronto and the GTA.

In 2016, HGTV premiered the follow-up series Bryan Inc., which would have a larger focus on his renovation business and family.

== Episodes ==
Season	Episodes	Originally released	
Season	Episodes	First released	Last released
1	13	January 5, 2012	March 8, 2012
2	13	August 30, 2012	October 25, 2012
3	26	August 26, 2013	February 17, 2014
4	26	August 25, 2014	February 16, 2015
5	13	August 31, 2015	October 12, 2015
6	13	January 4, 2016	February 29, 2016
7	13	March 3, 2017	April 17, 2017

=== Season 1 (2012) ===
No. in season	Title	Original release date
1	"Renovation Stand Off"	January 5, 2012
A couple who have their heart set on a kitchen renovation must adjust their expectations when Baeumler identifies that their front porch and part of their roof are in potential danger of collapse.
2	"Grounded Reno"	January 5, 2012
An older couple who are planning to retire to their family cottage within the next few years can barely agree on any of their desired improvements; Baeumler identifies an overlooked space in the home which can be easily converted into a new living and entertaining space that resolves some of their conflicting desires.
3	"Behind Closed Walls"	January 12, 2012
Bryan discovers a toxic mould infestation in the basement of a couple who have requested a bathroom renovation.
4	"Shotgun Reno"	January 12, 2012
A young couple cannot agree on whether to spend their current renovation budget on kitchen or bathroom improvements; for structural, value and project management reasons, Baumler identifies the kitchen as the bigger priority.
5	"Reno Under Pressure"	January 19, 2012
In a house full of abandoned renovations, Bryan has his work cut out for him. Attempting to tame Cindy’s excitement is as ambitious as this reno.
6	"The DIY Effect"	January 19, 2012
Jo-Ann and Brook are reno geeks who love to get their hands dirty. But Bryan is about to frame out a different problem and stop them from making a huge mistake!
7	"Sister Act"	January 26, 2012
Rosie bought her first house with the financial help of her sister Amal. With custom and high-end finishes on their reno wish list, Bryan’s about to teach these sisters it’s what’s on the inside – of their walls - that counts!
8	"Banished Bachelor"	February 2, 2012
Dennis's bachelor days are numbered. With his wife Ursula making permanent changes to their rental house turned family home, Dennis has to contend with not only his wife, but Bryan driving the decisions.
9	"Space Wars"	February 9, 2012
Peter and Sunny want more space in their home. With their sights set on a second bathroom, Bryan has other ideas swirling in his head.
10	"Deal or No Deal"	February 16, 2012
When it comes to renovations, Jamie and Tammy know what they want, but have little clue on what to do, or even where to start. Looks like their best move was handing over the reno to Bryan.
11	"Double Trouble"	February 23, 2012
When Miranda found out she was having twins, she and Sean knew their house wouldn’t cut it with their family size about to double. Add Bryan into the equation and Miranda may be having more than she bargained for!
12	"Reno Shock"	March 1, 2012
Mariam’s frustration with her home and her procrastinating husband have reached a boiling point. Can Bryan keep the waters calm? Or will it be rough sailing when she finds out Bryan’s reno pick!
13	"Reno Apocalypse"	March 8, 2012
Ruth and Eric are a young couple who can’t agree on the layout of their basement. Eric’s real plans of putting in a panic shelter are not jiving with Ruth’s practical basement family room. Will Bryan’s decision signal the end of one person’s dream reno, or both?

=== Season 2 (2012) ===
No. in season	Title	Original release date
1	"Backseat Contractor"	August 30, 2012
Sara & Wassim can’t agree on which renovation is next on their giant to do list. Bryan has to choose the reno they need and take on Sara who isn’t used to anyone else taking the wheel.
2	"Reno Rescue"	August 30, 2012
Rania and Steve know firsthand the saying, ‘when it rains it pours.’ Their house has been nothing but a money pit since they’ve moved in. The homeowners know which reno they want, but Bryan’s priority is helping them get out of the hole fast!
3	"The Reno Antagonist"	September 6, 2012
Laz and Juanita have renovated most of the main areas of their home and are now focused on making their reno dreams come true. But when Bryan chooses the space he thinks needs to be done first, he ends up in a battle with an army.
4	"Curbed Reno"	September 6, 2012
Des and Jeannice want their house’s interior to match the exterior curb appeal of their home. With the couple’s heart set on high-end custom finishes, Bryan may have to play the role of heartbreaker.
5	"The Way the Reno Crumbles"	September 13, 2012
Renee and Kris live in an aging home with a ton of character. They’re ready to bite the bullet and commit to a big reno project, but when Bryan discovers what lies beneath, they might be wishing for a different house.
6	"The Cold War"	September 13, 2012
Andy and Allison bought their first home - the shiny ‘50s wallpaper adorning the inside of their walls was free. They desperately need a modern update on all of their rooms, and Bryan hopes his reno choice doesn’t leave them cold.
7	"Battling Brothers"	September 20, 2012
Brothers Raj and Beej have a huge family and space is running out. Little brother Beej’s priorities conflict with his big brother Raj’s. But when Bryan chooses the reno they need, he may ignite a family feud.
8	"The Wall of Blame"	September 20, 2012
Carmen and Alex have saved up for their first reno in their modest home. They are thrilled with Bryan’s help, until a particular wall becomes a bigger deal than it’s worth.
9	"Baby Misteps [sic]"	September 27, 2012
Stefanie and Mike have hit all of their milestones in one year – marriage, a new home and a new baby on the way. But will Bryan be able to manage this mom to be, when she begins to fight for two.
10	"Looks Are Deceiving"	October 4, 2012
Sarah and Chris are all about temporary fixes. A touch of paint here, a quick mend there but it’s just not cutting it anymore. It’s time to Leave it to Bryan to rip off the Band-Aid and fix it the right way.
11	"Reno Rut"	October 11, 2012
Chantal and Vince have a long laundry list of projects to do in their house. The good news is that most of them have been started; the bad news is that none are finished! Will Bryan be able to help them get out of this reno rut?
12	"Builders Block"	October 18, 2012
Maria and David have 3 spaces that are untouched in their lack-luster subdivision house. They are battling bland, boring and underutilized. That is until Bryan picks a room!
13	"Reno Roadblock"	October 25, 2012
Anna and Frank are intimidated by the renovation process. They’ve tried to tackle projects on their own, but backed away once they hit a snag. Will this couple trust Bryan to finally take them to the finish line without hitting any more roadblocks?

=== Season 3 (2013–14) ===
No. in season	Title	Original release date
1	"Reno Misteps (sic)"	August 26, 2013
Terri is tired of her husband Julian who spends more time on house projects than with the family. She wants Bryan to take on one project so they get a finished room, but also so Terri gets her husband back. Julian’s used to being the contractor and he finds it hard to keep his cool when Bryan drives the steps.
2	"Battling Budgets"	August 27, 2013
Bree and Joey are always battling over Bree’s lofty ideas and Joey’s small budget. In the end the basement gets tackled, including a hockey practice area.
3	"Law and Mortar"	August 28, 2013
Jacqueline (criminal defence lawyer and black belt) and Ian are slowly converting an old triplex into a single family home. When Bryan tackles the bathroom, things really hit the roof.
4	"As Bad as it Gets"	August 28, 2013
Tony and Simone just want a functional home for their young family. Bryan discovers asbestos in the basement. Level three abatement required.
5	"The Wrong Footing"	September 4, 2013
Ryan and Renai felt the pain of a shoddy contractor for their kitchen and are just warming up to the idea of trying another renovation. But when Bryan finds poor footings and lack of roof supports, everyone is in for a huge shock.
6	"Reno Impact"	September 5, 2013
Karen & Marty took on their kitchen, but are left with a lot of projects that still need attention on their big to-do list. But when Bryan makes his choice, Karen and Marty have to make reno decisions now that could impact an entirely different reno.
7	"Safety Dance"	September 16, 2013
John and Emily have a love hate relationship with their home. When Bryan takes on this old home, they realize safety codes and permit restrictions take precedence over their wants.
8	"Wall Me Maybe"	September 16, 2013
Past problems at Jocelyn and Andrew’s home have dictated which reno they’ve been forced to do next. With Bryan making his choice about which room to do in the present, they have to be open to his ideas. Kitchen reno.
9	"Post with the Most"	September 23, 2013
Jeff and Lolly have no clue how to go about the renovation process. Once a major structural flaw in their home is found, Bryan has to convince them the value of structural work, over aesthetic design. When they come to take down the hall wall to open things up, a post is needed.
10	"A Leak of Faith"	September 23, 2013
Mike is used to being the site foreman and Sheri-Lee dictates the design. When Bryan takes over, Sheri-Lee and Mike have to keep the faith. Bedroom, bathroom or basement? Bathroom it is and the existing space is expanded nicely.
11	"Bursting at the Beams"	September 30, 2013
Ryan and Dana don’t have the know-how to take on any of the renos they want next. Once the demo goes deeper, the couple feels like the sky is falling. Ceiling, floor and walls of the family room are renovated.
12	"Labour Intensive"	September 30, 2013
Jeff and Marcia are expecting their first baby in their starter home. The old bungalow just isn’t going to cut it for their new family, but will their limited budget make the grade?
13	"Going Walls Out"	October 7, 2013
Michelle and Mateen bought their dream house, that didn’t turn out to be so turn key. They are slowly updating their home, but instead of making headway, they’re just getting headaches. The kitchen is improved and access to the pantry and family room is added.
14	"Path of Most Resistance"	January 6, 2014
Jody desperately wants to hire a professional before her husband Jeff learns the hard way that he just can’t take on the renovations himself. But when Bryan takes the lead, their priority for cosmetics gets taken to the curb. The paving, garage door and front porch are tackled.
15	"Safety Worst"	January 6, 2014
Dom and Greg’s 100-year-old home is full of surprises that they are terrified to uncover themselves. But once Bryan opens up the home, the writing’s on the wall. The office is merged into the family room and the powder room access is moved out of the kitchen.
16	"Say Your Prayers"	January 13, 2014
Mike and Michelle have a big home, but even bigger disagreements. When it comes to home repairs, these two have a reno revelation. The backyard is improved dramatically.
17	"Get your leak out"	January 13, 2014
Since Julian and Rebecca bought their home, they haven’t had much choice on where to spend their money when it came to home repairs. Now that they’re ready to focus on their reno wishlist, Bryan has to prepare them for a flood of issues. The extension is tackled and a powder room is added.
18	"Grout of Site"	January 20, 2014
Dave and Katy are indecisive when it comes to deciding which reno to start next. Dave can’t follow Katy’s changing wishlist, but Katy has to follow Bryan’s permanent plan.
19	"Shading Spaces"	January 27, 2014
Jodie and Bryan took on some projects in their house with some mixed results. They don’t agree which room to tackle next, and need Bryan to break them out of their reno rut now.
20	"Get into the Move"	January 27, 2014
Bryant thinks his home with his wife Kelly is one renovation away from being their dream house. Kelly isn’t convinced and is considering leaving this house behind for something new.
21	"The Price is Fight"	January 27, 2014
Lauren and Jamie are both creative types who have different visions for their home. Bryan has to bring these two design plans together, or one of them might be pulling their hair out.
22	"Construction Fore-Mom"	February 3, 2014
Peter and Wendy are trying to love the interior of their new home as much as they love the location. Wendy keeps getting caught up in the details, so Bryan has to keep Wendy focused on the big picture.
23	"Rocky Road"	February 3, 2014
Robert is pretty proud of his handiwork around the house, but his wife Alyssa knows his limits. When Bryan takes over the project, this reno goes wild.
24	"Skeptic Tank"	February 10, 2014
Mark wants to do the renovations in his home himself, but his wife Cassie wants the work done yesterday. When Bryan begins this reno, he has to dig this project out of a deep hole.
25	"Painted Flack"	February 10, 2014
Samantha and Blake bought her grandparents’ old bungalow. Blake is over Sam’s plan to paint everything and needs Bryan to teach her that cosmetic fixes don’t pass for being handy.
26	"Bricking Time Bomb"	February 17, 2014
Kelsey and Chris are taking on a lofty reno right before their wedding. Bryan is used to planning renovations, not disrupting wedding plans, but he might not have a choice this time.

=== Season 4 (2014–15) ===
No. in season	Title	Original release date
1	"Between Gyprock & A Hard Place"	August 25, 2014
Jeff and Kim started their dream reno three years ago. Now they have three half projects on hold. Bryan faces the most shocking reno he’s ever seen...
2	"A Can of Squirms"	August 25, 2014
Jen and Mitch are newlyweds who feel some reno regret after buying their fixer upper home. Bryan expects to find a can of worms when he works on old houses, but has to deal with more when he opens up sore spots in their relationship too!
3	"House Wreck of Bryan"	September 1, 2014
Crystal is tired of Dan’s quick fixes and discovering her husband’s cleverly-hidden mistakes. Bryan may have met his match when he comes face to face with his unhandy doppelgänger.
4	"Boiler Alert"	September 1, 2014
Andy is handy at work, but when it comes to his own home, Crystal is tired of unfinished projects. Bryan’s here to get their renos back on track, but once Andy plays into Bryan’s game, it’s no contest.
5	"Pain in the Glass"	September 8, 2014
Lore and Yan wish they could get a do-over on the renovations they did in their home. But when Bryan has the final say there’s no turning back and things get labour intensive.
6	"Where It Drains It Pours"	September 8, 2014
Edwin and Amy are slowly upgrading their house with their heart set on more space for their family. Things go awry when Bryan discovers one issue after another, and the rain shower turns into a full on thunder storm.
7	"Bluff Love"	September 15, 2014
Jen and Doug bought a quirky home with a lot of features they’re not so in love with anymore. With a big reno on deck and Jen’s even bigger personality to contend with, Bryan has his hands full!
8	"The Fighting's On The Wall"	September 15, 2014
Christine and Jeff are tired of fighting about which project is best for their family. But after Bryan makes his choice, he also has to play the part of peacekeeper.
9	"Pressure Cooker"	September 22, 2014
Chef Mike would love a restaurant-grade kitchen, while his wife Marilyn isn’t sure that’s the right choice. When they trust Bryan to decide, the chef might not like what Bryan’s cooking.
10	"Housing Crisis"	September 22, 2014
Amy and Bob need to get one reno done before they start a family. They have to get used to changes in the plan, or it’s going to be a losing battle.
11	"Reno Ride"	September 29, 2014
Dawn and Brad can’t ignore their house’s much-needed projects any longer. Bryan’s here to move their house’s renovations to the front burner, but they might not be ready for such a bumpy ride.
12	"All Hands on Wreck"	September 29, 2014
Lisa always recruits Katrina to help her with the random DIY projects she has in her home, but when she calls in Bryan, she find outs not only do you get what you pay for, you get what Bryan says.
13	"Ramp My Style"	June 10, 2014
Lori and Mitch have customized their bungalow so it’s perfectly accessible for their son Hayden. They’ve lost steam after years of doing their own renovations and though Bryan’s here to help, they quickly realize letting go of the reigns doesn’t come easy.
14	"Flood Bath"	January 5, 2015
Trish and Martin can’t wait to start their very first renovation. Even with their full trust in Bryan, when the walls come down, the flood gates are unleashed.
15	"Climbing the Walls"	January 1, 2015
David and Daniela’s home is in need of renovations, but with three young boys they don’t have the time or energy. Bryan takes one project off their plate but leaves some decisions up to them.
16	"Detailed Disoriented"	January 12, 2015
Jeff and Kathryn are learning what worked for them as renters isn’t working for them as homeowners. Bryan has to keep his eye on not only the reno, but also Jeff who checks everything twice.
17	"Rent Out of Shape"	January 12, 2015
Rebecca bought her first home and got her friend Rachel to move in to help out with the mortgage. Tired of doing the bare minimum on maintenance and repairs, Bryan commits the girls to a reno with some stormy results.
18	"Motion to Dismantle"	January 19, 2015
Sudevi and Shekhar don’t see eye to eye when it comes to renovations. Bryan rolls with the punches as he helps bring order to the house.
19	"Reviving the Roost"	January 19, 2015
When Susie and Louie move in to Susie’s childhood home, they have strong ideas about how Bryan can make the space their own.
20	"Wishing and Coping"	January 26, 2015
Craig and Lindsay want to renovate their home to better suit a family of five, but Bryan’s room choice catches them off guard.
21	"Daddy Duty"	January 26, 2015
Katie needs Matt to help with the kids, not start another reno project. Bryan helps them get their dream space without blowing the budget.
22	"Came in Like Eric-ing Ball"	February 2, 2015
Eric and Kristina recently moved from a condo to a house and they don’t know how or where to start renovating. Bryan gets more than he bargained for when Eric has building plans of his own.
23	"Chain of Tools"	February 2, 2015
Chaney and Maureen have ideas about how to update their home, but they need Bryan’s help on the follow-through.
24	"Before the Cookie Crumbles"	February 9, 2015
Sisters Alicia and Tania have a wish list for updating their old semi, but some projects need to be done sooner rather than later.
25	"Having a Wall"	February 9, 2015
Tracy and Chris want Bryan to help make their home a better long-term fit, but no renovation comes without surprises.
26	"A Cut Above"	February 16, 2015
Chris and Niki are burnt out after years of renovating. When Bryan he takes on their project, there are curveballs in store.

=== Season 5 (2015) ===
No. in season	Title	Original release date
1	"Overlook the Details"	August 31, 2015
Monica and Gary want to kick back and enjoy their forever home. Bryan takes on a reno that will have them relaxing in style.
2	"Another Level"	August 31, 2015
Monica and Gary want to kick back and enjoy their forever home. Bryan takes on a reno that will have them relaxing in style.
3	"Sew Close"	September 7, 2015
Sharon and Andy are burnt out after taking on three major renos in five years. When Bryan steps in, they have to adjust to someone else doing the work.
4	"Come Hell or High Water"	September 7, 2015
Adrienne and Rich have lofty visions for their house. When Bryan has to address a big issue, will the homeowners’ budget meet the demands of their wish list?
5	"Checks Please"	September 14, 2015
Jackie and Jamie want to make their house feel like a cozy retreat for their family. When Bryan takes his pick of renos, the road to relaxation hits a few speed bumps.
6	"Cut It Out"	September 14, 2015
Pamela and Daryl can’t decide which reno to take on before their first baby arrives. Bryan encourages them to think on the bright side when things don’t go to plan
7	"Twist and Doubt"	September 21, 2015
Taras and Natalie are desperate to gain living space for their growing family. The reno takes a dramatic turn when Bryan gets real about their budget.
8	"All About the Base"	September 21, 2015
Karen is ready for a dream renovation for her and Jim’s house. Bryan has to win her over when practicality takes priority.
9	"Giving Up Green"	September 28, 2015
Craig and Pippa are daunted by the idea of a large reno. Will Bryan earn their trust as he works through their laundry list of wants?
10	"Turn Down or What"	September 28, 2015
Steve and Stacey can’t prioritize their long overdue renos. When Bryan enters the scene, they learn that one renovation can drastically change a living situation.
11	"Pillar Instinct"	October 5, 2015
Steve and Stacey can’t prioritize their long overdue renos. When Bryan enters the scene, they learn that one renovation can drastically change a living situation.
12	"Royal Pain"	October 5, 2015
Sharon has strong opinions about renovating her daughter Nicole’s house. Bryan gets a crash course in the family dynamic as he takes on a large project.
13	"Electric Feel"	October 12, 2015
Kevin and Leah are full of renovation ideas but they need help with the execution. When Bryan takes on a project he discovers an issue that no one expected.

=== Season 6 (2016) ===
No. in season	Title	Original release date
1	"The Point of it All"	January 4, 2016
May desperately wants to give Shawn’s bachelor pad a facelift. While Bryan takes on one of their projects, there are some non-construction issues that they have to deal with on their own.
2	"Ants In Their Pants"	January 4, 2016
Elise and Pierre are ready to spend big on their first renovation. Bryan shows them that even dream projects have limits.
3	"The Hole Shebang"	January 11, 2016
James and Leah want to make James’ grandfather’s house their own. When Leah chooses to stay out of the renovation process, James has to trust that Bryan will deliver.
4	"Wiggle Room"	January 11, 2016
Shannon and Corrie are overwhelmed by their first house. Bryan takes on a major renovation, but the homeowners still need to face the realities of a fixer upper.
5	"To The Window, To The Walls"	January 18, 2016
Sara and Trevor need more functional living space for their family. When Bryan gets to work, he shows them that open concept doesn’t always make sense.
6	"Stone Faced"	January 18, 2016
Michelle and Reid need Bryan to take one of their projects off their plate. When the renovation delivers a curveball, Reid ends up being more involved than he expected.
7	"The Right Stuff"	January 25, 2016
Paul and Denise’s disorganization is keeping them from enjoying their house. Bryan faces his own challenges when he takes on a unique project.
8	"Inside The Box"	January 25, 2016
Stuart and Yvette want to put the finishing touches on their home. When Bryan takes on a big reno, design obstacles compromise their dream space.
9	"Wet Wipe"	February 1, 2016
Erin and Karl are ready for their first major renovation. Bryan encounters budget constraints when he tries to make a space that’s both practical and party-ready.
10	"Tri Again"	February 8, 2016
Greg and Sheila need more functional living space for their family. Bryan comes up with a storage-gaining solution that the homeowners have difficulty embracing.
11	"Can't Feel My Place"	February 15, 2016
Nancy wants to create her forever home, but Jennifer questions her mom’s vision. Bryan attempts to turn their quirky reno dreams into reality.
12	"Raw Deal"	February 22, 2016
Dina and Ayman are ready to put down roots and renovate, but they struggle with leaving their wish list at Bryan’s mercy.
13	"Buzz Kill"	February 29, 2016
Todd and Whitney want to update their house for the long term. While Bryan takes on a much-needed reno, the homeowners get caught up with the bells and whistles.

=== Season 7 (2017) ===
No. in season	Title	Original release date
1	"The Reno-way Bride"	March 3, 2017
Judy and David are ambitiously taking on a wedding and a reno in the same month. When Bryan gets involved and makes the decisions, these newlyweds could get cold feet.
2	"High Steaks"	March 6, 2017
Paul and Julie just moved in and they can’t wait to get started on customizing their home. Paul’s a realtor who likes being in charge, so Bryan has to get used to Paul’s meddling when he goes way over asking.
3	"What the Smell"	March 13, 2017
John and Taylor are tired of upgrading their home for prospective buyers and not for themselves. Excited to get Bryan in to help them renovate their forever home, letting go of control is going to be a hard sell.
4	"Stone Tag"	March 13, 2017
Daniel and Rachelle are excited to start some work in their new home except that’s the only thing they can agree on. When Rachelle tries to communicate what she wants, Bryan gets caught up in an epic game of stone tag.
5	"Worst Time Home Buyer"	March 20, 2017
Carley and Conan are first time home buyers who were not prepared for the slew of problems they found after they moved in. With a looming deadline of less than a month before their first baby is born, Bryan helps them through some reno growing pains!
6	"Happy Two Feet"	March 20, 2017
Bryan is shocked to hear after 12 years, the living room bookshelves Matt promised Fiona are still not done! Matt’s history of adding in a couple feet here and there to rooms in his home is about to come to an unhappy ending.
7	"Good Cop Dad Hops"	March 27, 2017
Kelly and Dave need to find ways to expand their small home to make it more suitable for their family. Bryan’s used to finding skeletons in old houses he has to fix, but this time Bryan’s past comes back to haunt him!
8	"Over the Honeymoon"	March 27, 2017
Linda and Mike are newlyweds who are ready to settle in and start renos on their home. When Bryan’s faced with choosing the best space to start their life off right, their big gamble might not pay off.
9	"Shock and Roll"	April 3, 2017
Tremayne and Adama were thrown into the deep end of first time home ownership after leaving their brand new condo behind. Adapting to bigger bills and a lot more home maintenance has been tough, but when Bryan takes over it’s not the only shock they’re in for.
10	"Kill Drill"	April 3, 2017
Joy and Mahmood are finally due for some renos in their old home. With Mahmood positive he can help Bryan take on any task, being overly confident could cost him big!
11	"Gold Meddle-ist"	April 10, 2017
Tracy lives in her big sister Laurie’s old home and knows it’s time to make it her own. While Laurie can’t help but input on design, Bryan can’t help but wonder if the old adage about there being too many cooks in the kitchen, should be changed to too many designers on site!
12	"Paddle Tale"	April 10, 2017
Mark is admittedly not the most handy guy to the dismay of his wife Elaine. Desperate to get some help from Bryan, this couple puts it all on the line in an ultimate do or die competition.
13	"Doubt and About"	April 17, 2017
After years of inaction on updating their home, Fraser and Angela can’t deny they need someone like Bryan to help kick them into gear. But the road to complete one reno gets pretty bumpy when Fraser finds it difficult to be a passenger.
